= Gardens of Castle Howard =

Garden of Castle Howard, Henderskelfe, North Yorkshire, England

Coordinates: 54.119°N 0.905°W

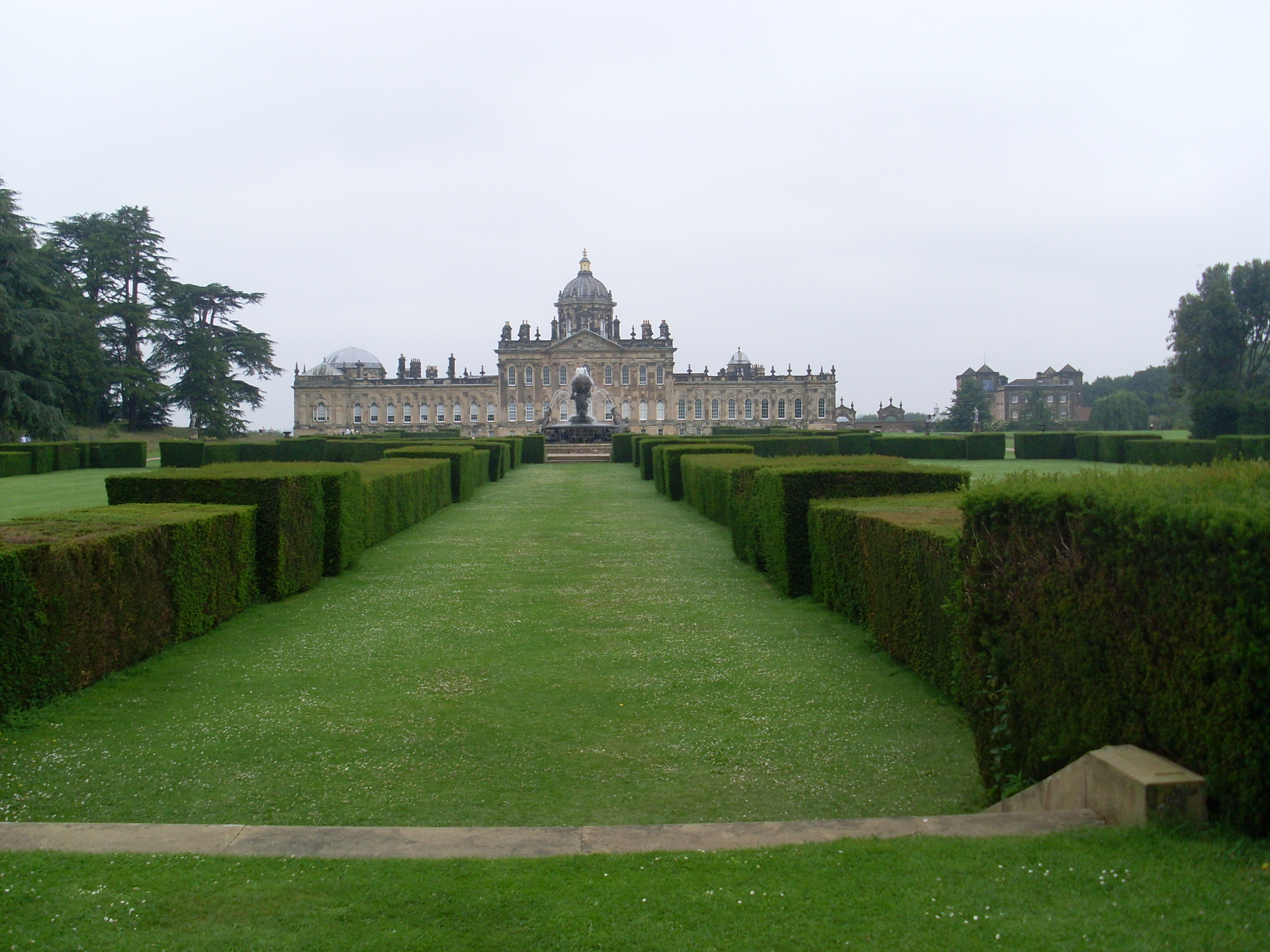
The South Parterre, with Castle Howard in the background

Castle Howard is a stately home in North Yorkshire, in England. It has extensive gardens, surrounded by a park. The grounds as a whole are grade I listed, while there are numerous listed structures within them.

== History ==
The estate of Castle Howard was described by John Leland in 1540 as having a park four miles around, with much young woodland. At the end of the 17th century, Charles Howard, 3rd Earl of Carlisle commissioned a scheme from George London to redesign the grounds, which would have created canals, avenus and circular lawns. London's scheme was rejected, and instead in 1699 John Vanbrugh was commissioned to create a new house and gardens. Vanbrugh's designs were still being implemented at his death in 1726, and the work may have been finished off by Nicholas Hawksmoor.

Later in the 18th century, the Great Lake and South Lake were created. The South Parterre was remodelled in 1850 by William Andrews Nesfield, who also made changes to the South Lake. In the 1890s, the South Parterre was simplified and the South Lake altered. The house and gardens were opened to the public in 1952, since when there has been much restoration work.

== Layout ==
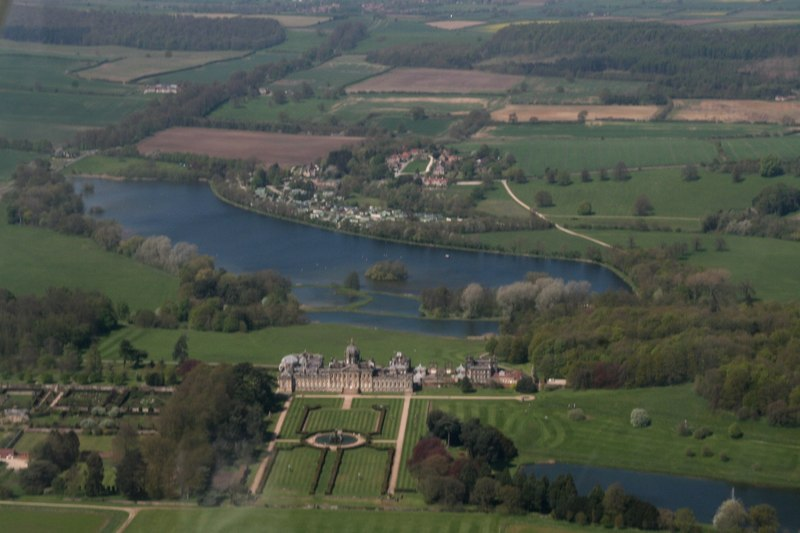
The estate from above, in 2018

A fontain in the Walled Garden

The estate covers 2,400 hectares, including the gardens, parkland and surrounding agricultural land. The main house is on a high site, close to the centre of the estate. To its north is a large lawn, leading down to the Great Lake, on which are a boathouse and modern playground area. To its west is the Boar Garden, and beyond that The Stables. To its south is the Broad Walk, running east–west. Beyond the path, southwest of the house is the Walled Garden, with the Irish Yew Garden to its south. South of the house is the South Parterre, with the former Wilderness to its south – a symmetrical hedge maze, designed by Vanbrugh but later destroyed – and to its south, The Pyramid. Southeast of the house is the Temple Terrace, leading up to the Temple of the Four Winds, with the South Lake to its south.

Surrounding the gardens is the parkland. Notable features include Ray Wood to the east of the house; the main entrance route, a 6 kilometres (3.7 miles) approach flanked by lime trees and passing various follies to the west, and beyond it, the Yorkshire Arboretum; and Pretty Wood further to the southeast. Horace Walpole described the estate as providing "the grandest scenes of rural magnificence".

=== Boar Garden ===
The boar statue

The Boar Garden lies west of the house, between its driveway and the Broad Walk. It was created in the 1760s, and is centred on a statue of a seated wild boar, a copy of a statue in the Uffizi in Florence. The statue is in marble on a sandstone pedestal. The pedestal is rectangular on two steps, with a moulded base and cornice, and contains panels with designs in relief. It is grade I listed, and was restored in 2010.

Grade II-listed statues in the garden include a carved fruit basket, two vases and two urns.

Immediately west of the garden is a figure of a shepherd boy leaning on a tree stump. The grade II-listed statue is about 3.5 metres (11 ft) high, and made of lead. The pedestal is in sandstone and is slender, with a moulded base and cornice.

=== South Parterre ===
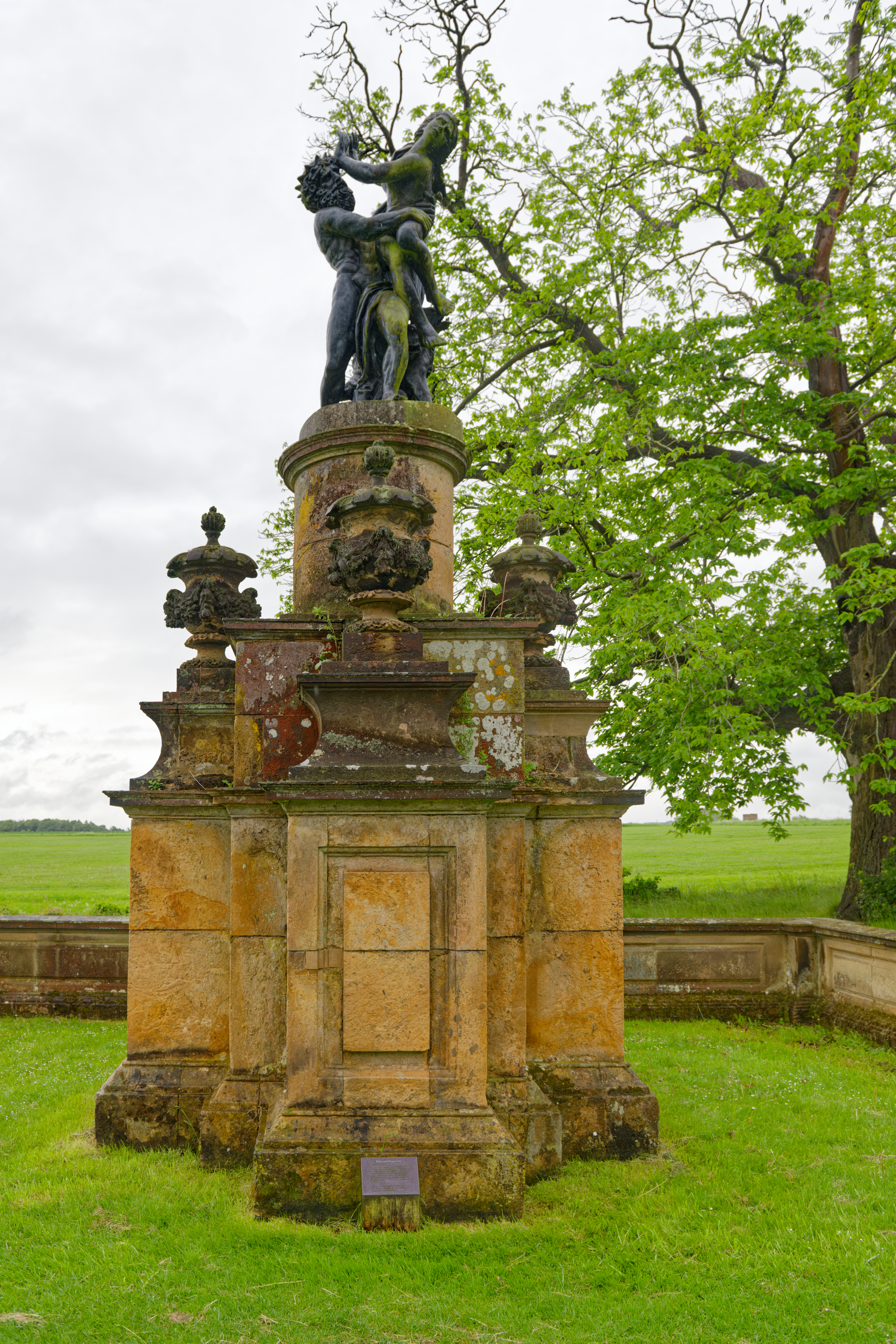
The statue of wrestlers

The South Parterre was completed in about 1725, and was originally a lawned area, with an assortment of obelisks, urns and statues, and a 50 feet (15 m) column. These were swept away by Nesfield, but the only element of his design to survive is the central Atlas Fountain. The current design consists of grass lawns and yew hedges, with a haha wall at its southern edge. Tim Richardson describes it as "in geometric sympathy with the south facade of the house. But...this is not the main event". The grade II-listed balustrade and wall at the south end of the South Parterre of Castle Howard are built of sandstone, and extend for about 100 metres (330 ft). They turn at the ends to enclose pedestals, between which is an open section with bulbous balusters. The balustrade includes blind sections with fielded panels around the pedestals.

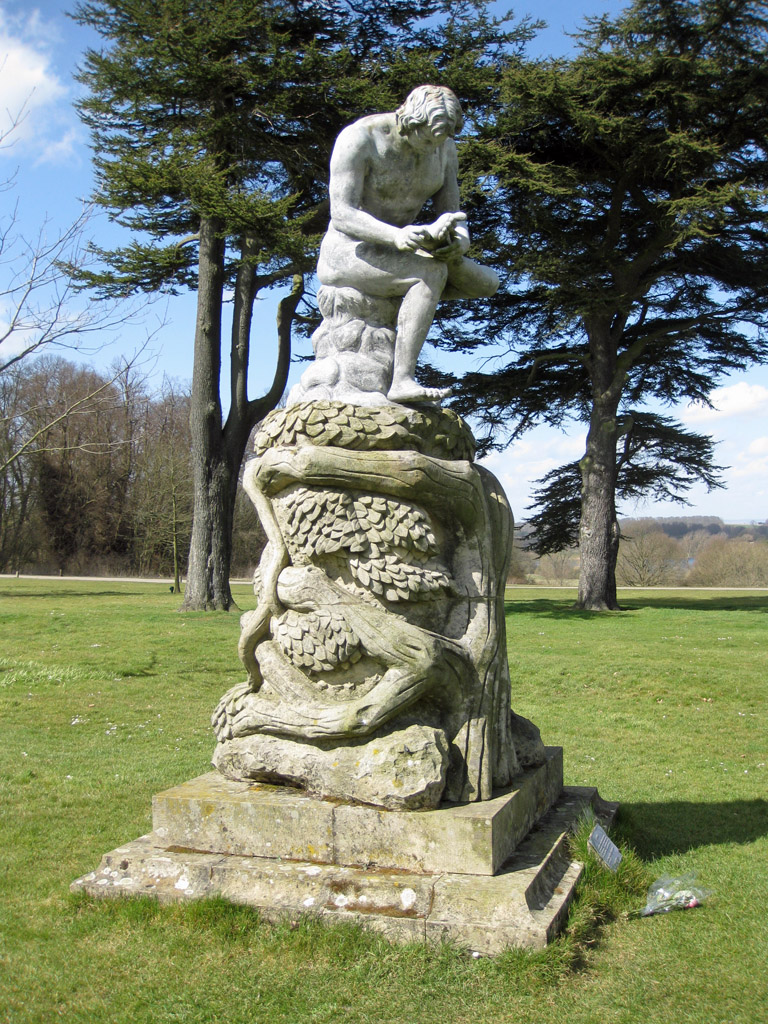
The statue of Spinario

There are numerous historic statues on the parterre. At its southern edge are two grade I-listed statues: one of wrestlers, and one of Spinario, a boy seated and removing a thorn from his foot. Each is on a pedestal of sandstone, about 4.5 metres (15 ft) high, which was designed by Hawksmoor. It has a central rectangular pier on which is a drum pedestal, flanked by rectangular buttresses with raised panels, each carrying an urn with festoons and a finial on a shaped base. It has a moulded base and cornices and carries a statue of wrestlers.

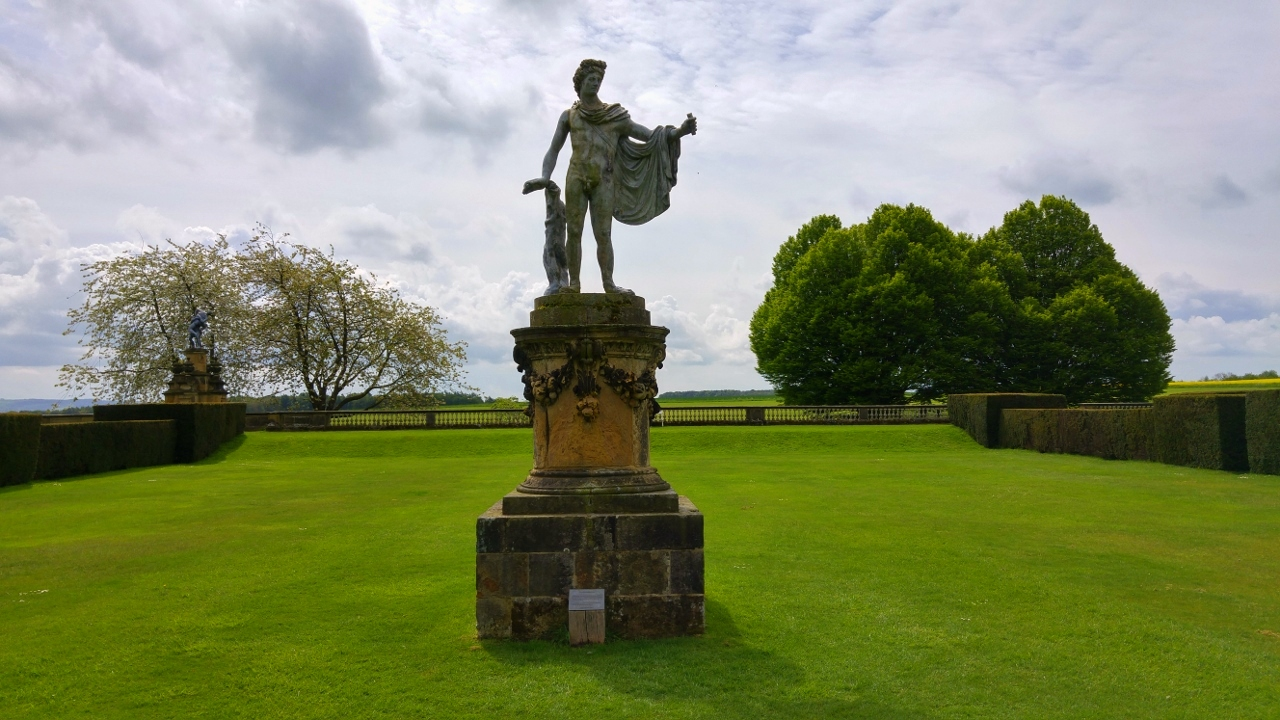
Statue of Apollo Belvedere

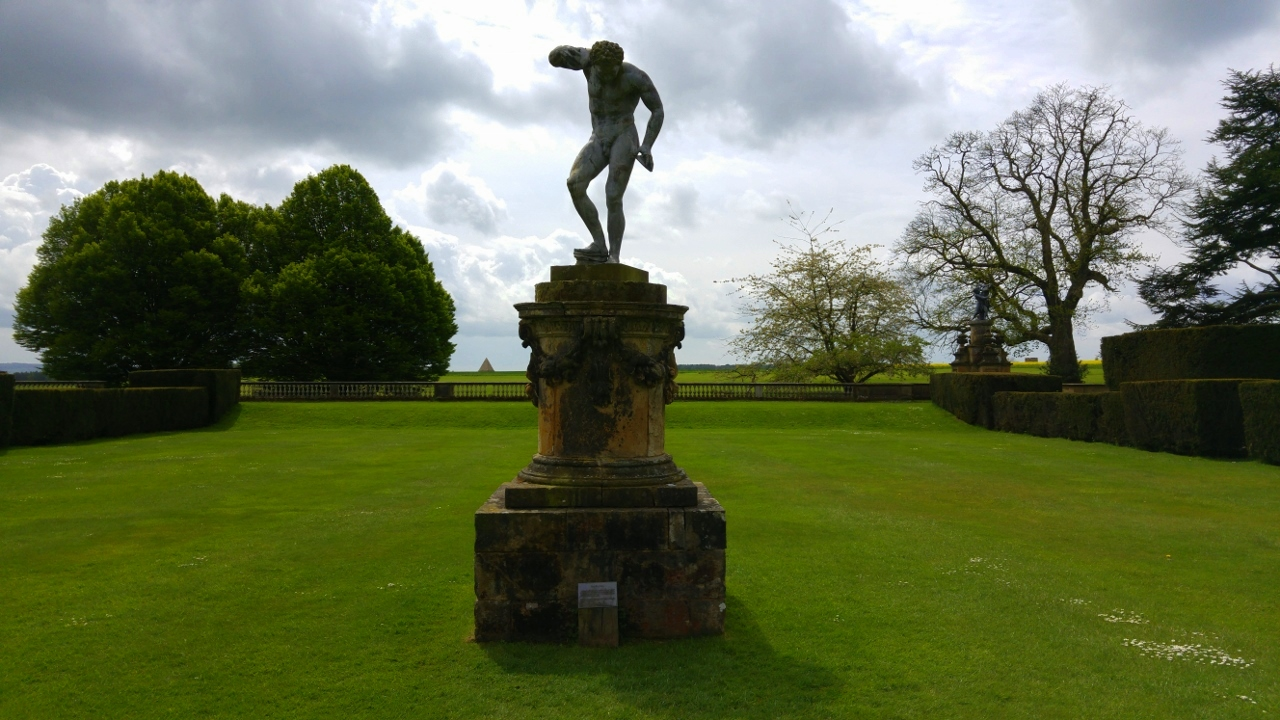
Statue of the faun with cymbals

About 90 metres south of the Atlas Fountain are a pair of statues. One depicts Apollo Belvedere and is a copy of a statue by Leochares in the Vatican Museums in Rome. It is grade II* listed, made of lead and was designed by John Cheere. The other is grade II listed and depicts a dancing faun with cymbals. The sandstone pedestal is about 2.5 metres (8 ft 2 in) high, with a square three-course base, and a drum pedestal with a moulded base and cornice, and festoons.

To the east, northeast, east-northeast and west of the Atlas Fountain are four grade II-listed vases, each about 3 metres (9.8 ft) high. The pedestals are on two steps, have a moulded base and cornice, and contain blind fielded panels. The sandstone vases are ovoid on a fluted base, and have lipped rims carrying vine scrolls.

Northeast and northwest of the fountain are also a pair of kylixes, and a pair of plant containers, all listed. The kylixes are in sandstone, and about 3 metres (9.8 ft) high. They are on pedestals with one step, a moulded base, sunken panels with waterleaf borders, a quadripartite acanthus motif in the centre, and a bead and ovolo frieze with an egg-and-dart moulded cornice. These are surmounted by fluted kylixes with a lipped rim. The plant containers are made of limestone and have oval plans. Two steps lead up to a concave gadrooned base with beaded moulding. On this is a convex gadrooned plant container decorated with acanthus leaves.

To the northwest of the parterre is a grade II*-listed statue of a faun carrying a kid on his shoulders propped by an iron bar under the right arm. It is a copy of a statue in the Prado Museum, Madrid. The statue is in lead, dating probably from 1723, and by Andrew Carpenter. The pedestal is in sandstone, and has festoons in relief hanging from four consoles at the level of a moulded frieze.

To the northeast of the parterre is a grade II*-listed statue of Silenus leaning on a tree trunk and holding the child Bacchus in his arms. It is a copy of a statue in the Louvre, Paris. The pedestal in the grounds of Castle Howard is in sandstone, and is 2.5 metres (8 ft 2 in) high. It has a square base and a drum pedestal with a moulded base and cornice, and festoons. The statue is in lead and dates from the mid-18th century.

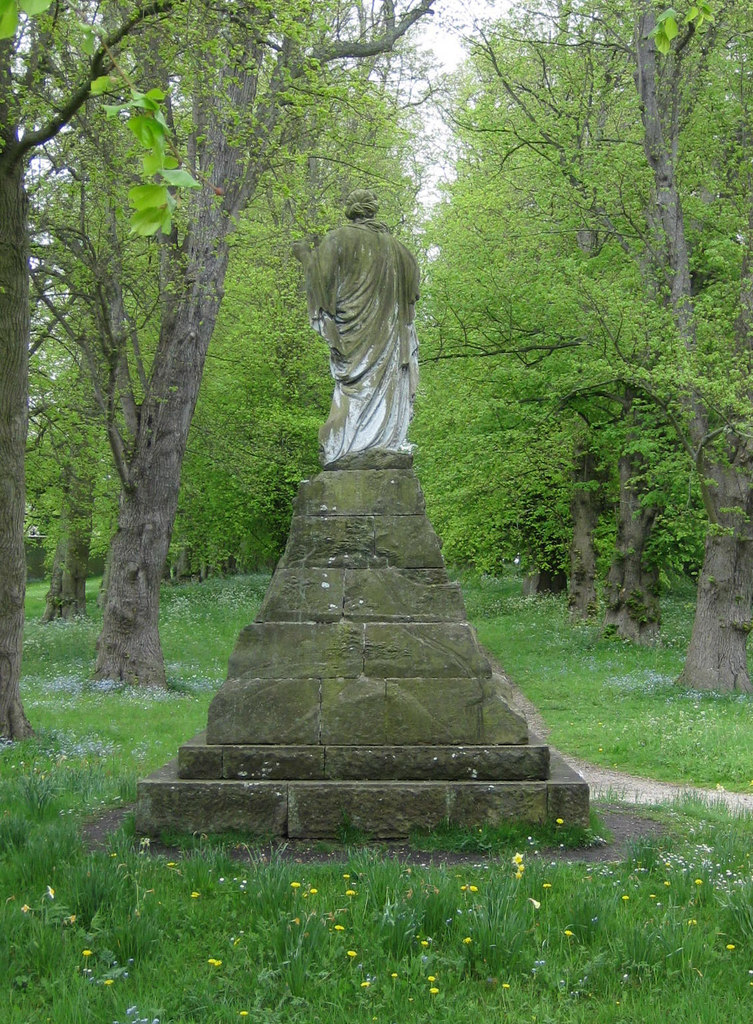
Statue of a figure playing a lyre

In a small wooded area immediately to the west of the parterre is a statue of a figure in loose drapes holding a lyre. It is grade II*-listed, carved out of sandstone, and about 5 metres (16 ft) high. The pedestal is pyramidal, and carved to suggest a craggy mountain with trees, ruins and a stream, and on it is a plaque inscribed with a poem.

== See also ==
- Grade I listed buildings in North Yorkshire (district)
- Listed buildings in Henderskelfe
- Listed parks and gardens in Yorkshire and the Humber
