= The Stables, Castle Howard =

Stable at Castle Howard, North Yorkshire, England

Coordinates: 54°07′14″N 0°54′42″W

Outside view of the stables

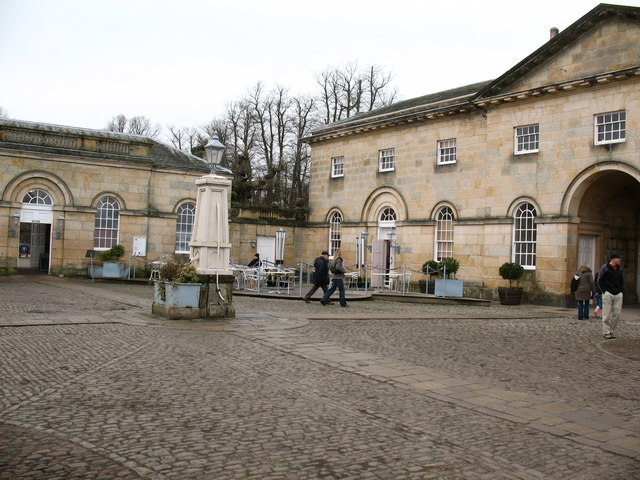
The west and north sides of the stable courtyard

The Stables are a historic building at Castle Howard, in North Yorkshire, in England.

== History ==
Castle Howard was rebuilt in the early 18th century, but the stables survived from the old castle. By 1770, they were in poor repair, and Frederick Howard, 5th Earl of Carlisle commissioned William Chambers to design a replacement. Foundations were laid in 1781, but Chambers' design proved unaffordable, and a new design was commissioned from John Carr in 1782. The stable block was completed in 1784, and could accommodate forty horses, five carriages, and several grooms.

The stables remained in use into the 20th century, but by the 1940s were used for storing potatoes. In the 1960s, it was converted into a public gallery showcasing historic costumes. This closed in the 1990s, and the block now houses the estate's ticket office, cafe, and two shops. The stables have been grade I listed since 1987.

== Architecture ==
=== Stable Block ===
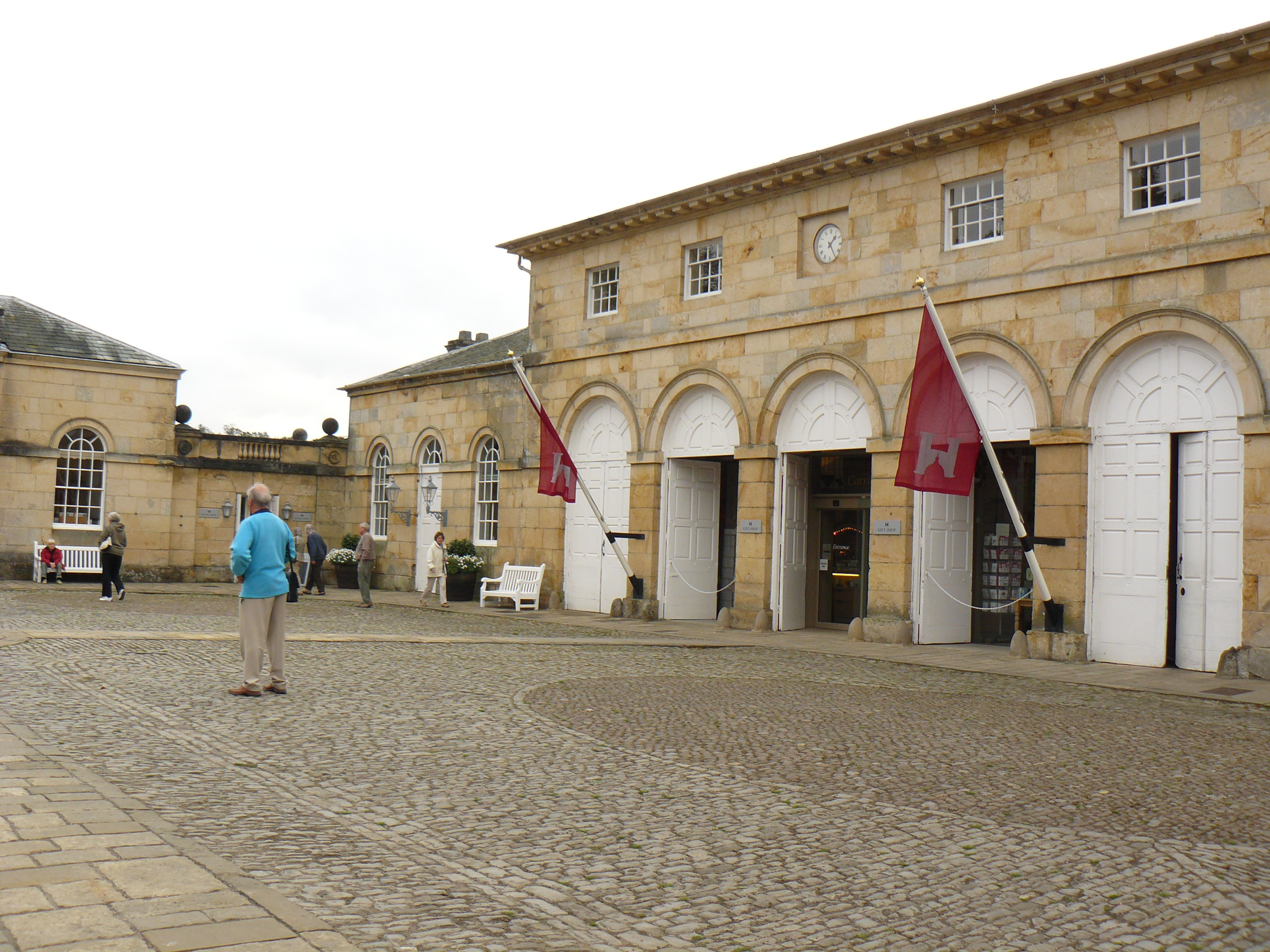
The south side of the stable courtyard

The stable block is built of limestone with hipped Westmorland slate roofs, forming four ranges around a quadrangle. The main range has two storeys and nine bays with a continuous impost band, and single-storey extensions at the ends. The middle three bays are in Tuscan style, and contain a tall arch flanked by sash windows with radial glazing. The corner pavilions have sash windows flanked by flat buttresses with paterae friezes and ball finials, clasping a coped parapet with blind balustrading to the centre. In the upper floor are sash windows, a balustrade over the middle three bays, and a central panel with swags and paterae, vases at each end, and a central urn flanked by dogs. The dogs were originally placed on the Exclamation Gate, and were moved to the stables by Carr.

=== Pump ===
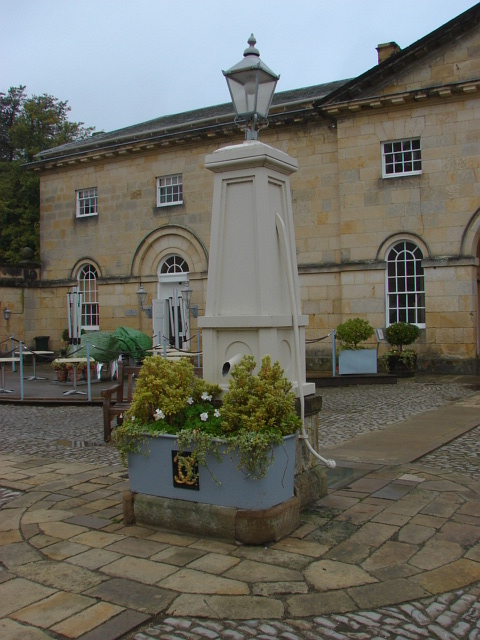
The pump

The pump in the centre of the stable yard is grade II listed. It is constructed of limestone and wood, and is about 2 metres (6 ft 7 in) high. It has a square base with a chamfered plinth, and a wooden pier with sunken panels and a low band. This tapers to a moulded cornice, and is surmounted by a lamp.

=== Victoria Gate ===
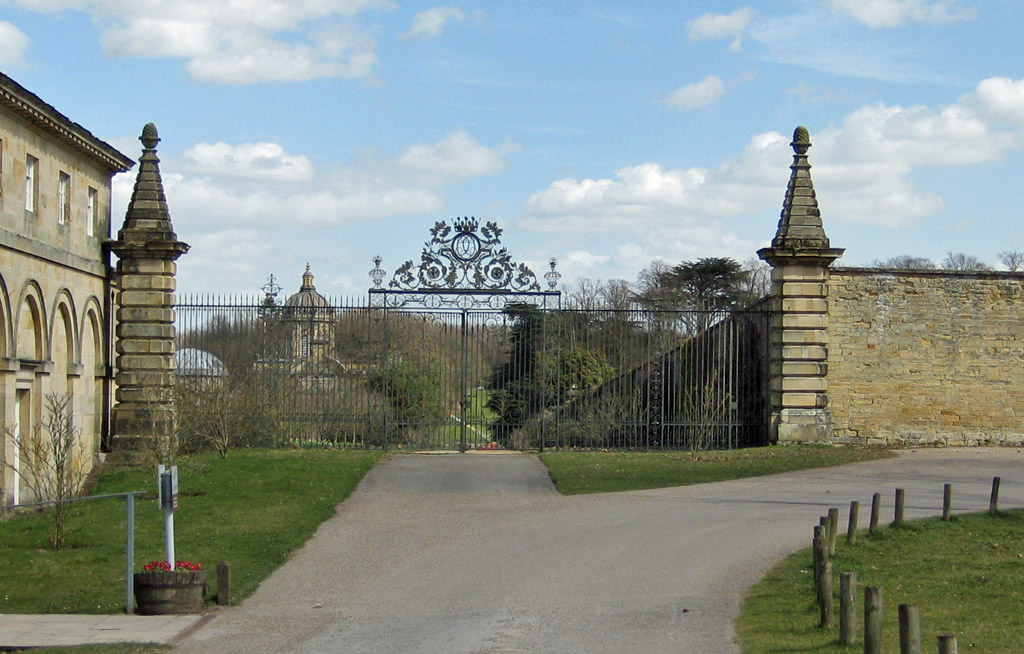
The Victoria Gate

Adjoining the stables, and the Walled Garden, is the grade I listed Victoria Gate, dating from the early 18th century. The pier to the north of the gate is in sandstone, it has a cruciform plan, it is rusticated, and is about 5 metres (16 ft) high. It has a moulded cornice, a pyramidal cap and a pineapple finial. The gates and railings are in wrought iron, and about 4 metres (13 ft) high. Above the gates is an elaborate overthrow surmounted by a crown.

== See also ==
- Grade I listed buildings in North Yorkshire (district)
- Listed buildings in Henderskelfe
