= The Dairies =

Pair of historic buildings in North Yorkshire, England

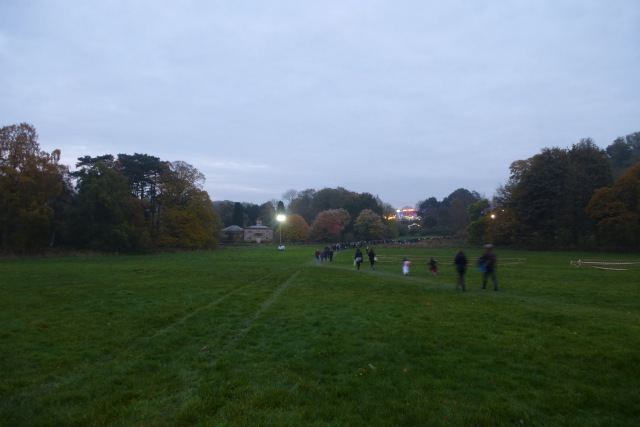
Approaching Castle Howard across fields, with the east house visible in the distance

The Dairies are a pair of historic buildings on the Castle Howard estate, in North Yorkshire, in England.

The east house (54°07′27″N 0°54′35″W) is the older of the two, designed by John Vanbrugh and completed in about 1720, with various later alterations. The western house (54°07′25″N 0°54′41″W), incorporating a coach house, was constructed in the early 19th century and was later used for farm storage. Llewellyn Hall describes the east house as "a pretty building picturesquely placed", in a hollow by a lake. The estate maintained a dairy herd through the centuries, until 2000. The east house was grade II listed in 1949, and upgraded to grade II* in 1987, when the west house was listed at grade II.

The east house, with two pavilions and a connecting wall to the left, were designed by John Vanbrugh, and are in sandstone. The house has a moulded cornice, a low parapet with urns on the corners, and a Welsh slate roof. There are two storeys and three bays. The doorway has an architrave, a decorated pulvinated frieze, and a moulded pediment on consoles. The windows are sashes in architraves, with stepped keystones. The adjacent pavilion has one storey and three bays, and has casement windows and a hipped roof. The connecting wall is coped, and contains a doorway with a flat arch, and the end pavilion has two storeys, a single bay, casement windows and a hipped roof. At the rear is a Venetian window and a pediment.

The west house and coach house are in limestone under a hipped Westmorland slate roof. The coach house to the left has two storeys and six bays, and contains a blind arcade with round arches and an impost band. The doorway has a fanlight, and the windows have fixed lights. The house has two storeys and two bays, and overhanging eaves. The round-arched doorway has a rusticated surround and a fanlight, and the windows are sashes.

== See also ==
- Grade II* listed buildings in North Yorkshire (district)
- Listed buildings in Henderskelfe
