= New River Bridge, Castle Howard =

Bridge in North Yorkshire, England

Coordinates: 54°07′07″N 0°53′39″W

The bridge, in 2026

The New River Bridge is a historic bridge in the grounds of Castle Howard, in North Yorkshire, in England.

The New River was widened in the 1730s, as part of the landscaping of the Castle Howard estate. In 1744, the bridge was constructed to take visitors across the river, probably to a design by Daniel Garrett. Tim Richardson describes it as "perfectly in scale with its surroundings", but as a result "not quite... all of a piece with the rest" of the buildings on the estate. It was grade I listed in 1954.

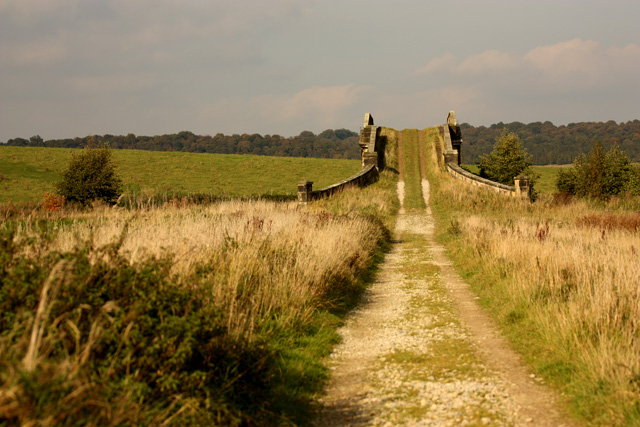
The track over the bridge

The Baroque bridge is constructed of sandstone, and consists of three stepped segmental arches with rusticated voussoirs, the central arch with a mask keystone. The cutwaters have banded rustication, and flanking the central arch are niches in architraves with a pulvinated frieze and consoles supporting a pediment. Over the central arch is a cornice on brackets, a low parapet, and a central balustrade with coping. The approaches are ramped, with balustrading, rusticated piers in the centre, and square-section end piers.

== See also ==
- Grade I listed buildings in North Yorkshire (district)
- Listed buildings in Henderskelfe
