= Pretty Wood =

Wood in North Yorkshire, England

Coordinates: 54°06′40″N 0°52′57″W

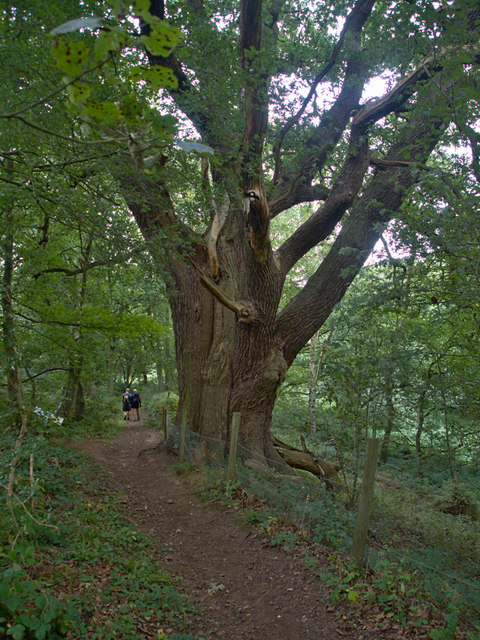
King Oak, in Pretty Wood

Pretty Wood is a woodland area of the Castle Howard estate in North Yorkshire, in England. It contains two historic structures.

== History ==
The wood lies south-east of the main house at Castle Howard. It is a steeply sloped area, and was a popular location for the Howard family to ride out to during the 18th and 19th centuries. It contains numerous oak trees, including the large King Oak.

The wood contains two follies, probably designed by Nicholas Hawksmoor and completed by 1727: a pyramid and the Four Faces structure. Kerry Downes describes the two as "utterly pointless", with "no reason for being there and leav[ing] all your questions unanswered". Nikolaus Pevsner was more complimentary, describing the Four Faces as a "pretty bauble". John Dixon Hunt notes that they "recall us to cultural origins in ancient Rome and Renaissance Italy, yet they do so on as English a site as could be imagined".

== Pyramid ==
The grade I listed pyramid is built of limestone, about 8 metres (26 ft) high, and has a square plinth with a rusticated base and a moulded frieze. The rusticated pyramid stands on the base. It was restored in 2000. From it, The Pyramid, a slightly later work, is visible.

== Four Faces ==
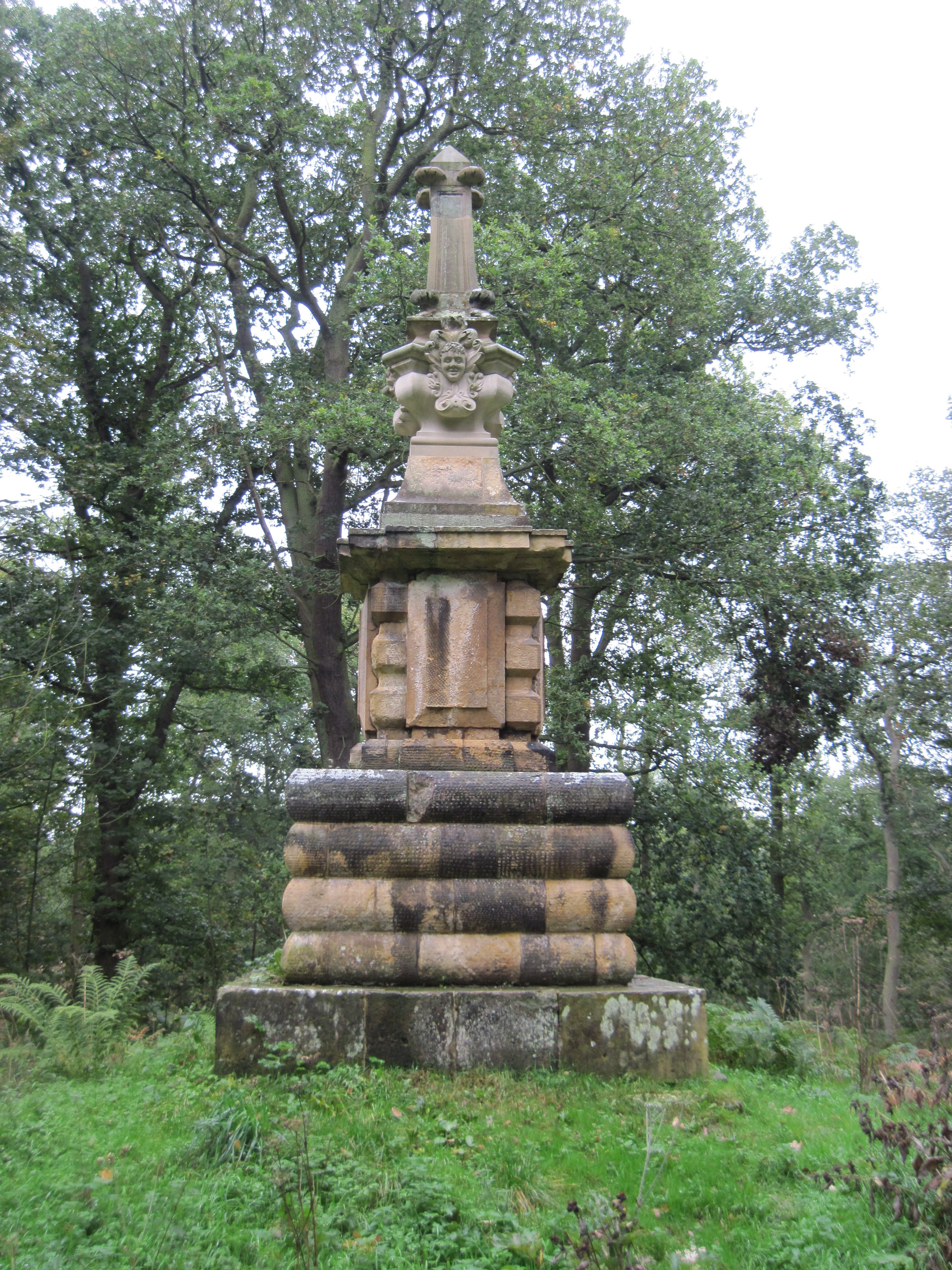
The Four Faces

The grade I listed statue is built of limestone and about 6 metres (20 ft) high. It has a square plinth with four pulvinated courses, and a rusticated base with raised panels and a moulded cornice. On this is a tapering column, and a bulbous four-cornered sculpture depicting faces, above which is a decorated apex. It was restored between 1997 and 2003.

== See also ==
- Grade I listed buildings in North Yorkshire (district)
- Listed buildings in Henderskelfe
