= Listed buildings in Henderskelfe =

Henderskelfe is a civil parish in the county of North Yorkshire, England. It contains 62 listed buildings that are recorded in the National Heritage List for England. Of these, 16 are listed at Grade I, the highest of the three grades, 16 are at Grade II*, the middle grade, and the others are at Grade II, the lowest grade. The parish does not contain any settlements, and its most important building is the country house, Castle Howard. This is listed, and all the other listed buildings in the parish are associated with the house, in its surroundings, gardens, grounds and estate.

== Key ==
| Grade | Criteria |
|---|---|
| I | Buildings of exceptional interest, sometimes considered to be internationally important |
| II* | Particularly important buildings of more than special interest |
| II | Buildings of national importance and special interest |

== Buildings ==
| Name and location | Photograph | Date | Notes | Grade |
|---|---|---|---|---|
| The Thorns; 54.12282°N 0.92287°W | — | Late 17th century | The house, which was later altered and extended, is in sandstone and has a pantile roof with gable coping and shaped kneelers. There are two storeys and attics, four bays, and a rear cross-wing. On the front is a doorway and sash windows, most of which are horizontally-sliding, and a casement window. The attic contains gabled brick dormers with sashes. | II |
| Castle Howard and East Court; 54.12146°N 0.90594°W | | 1701–14 | A large country house with outbuildings to the east, designed by John Vanbrugh with Nicholas Hawksmoor. It is built in limestone with roofs of lead and Westmorland slate, and is in Palladian style. The south front has a central block of two storeys and nine bays, and is flanked by nine-bay wings and pavilions with a single storey. Behind the central block is a dome with a lantern. The east court originally contained the kitchen and has later been used for offices and accommodation. | I |
| Satyr Gate, walls, gates and piers, Walled Garden; 54.11934°N 0.91081°W | | 1705 | The Satyr Gate, designed by John Vanbrugh, is in limestone on the west front and brick elsewhere. It contains a round-arched gateway with a rusticated surround, carved satyrs on the exterior, and lions' masks in the interior. Above it is a ramped cornice with a keystone, and carved flower baskets. The gates and overthrow are in wrought iron with scrolling. The garden was enlarged in the 1850s, and is enclosed by walls with corner piers, and three major gateways, each with different features. | I |
| The Obelisk; 54.12060°N 0.91554°W | | 1714 | The obelisk, designed by John Vanbrugh, is in stone, it has a square plan, and is about 80 metres (260 ft) high. The obelisk stands on a massive square base with a pulvinated cornice, and on the east and west sides are inscriptions, the latter indecipherable. | I |
| Pyramid Gatehouse and wings 54.11619°N 0.91435°W | | 1719 | The gatehouse in the grounds of Castle Howard was designed by John Vanbrugh. It is in limestone on a chamfered plinth, and has a pyramidal stone slate roof surmounted by a pyramid. It contains a round arch with an impost band on consoles, and a band, above which is a coat of arms. There is machicolation over the arch with a keystone and an inscribed plaque. The flanking wings have two storeys and eight bays, the second and outer bays projecting under a pediment with a ball finial. In the ground floor are round-arched sash windows forming an arcade with an impost band and keystones. The upper floor contains sash windows in the left wing, and casements in the right wing. At the rear is a balcony on a Tuscan column, an L-shaped flight of stairs and a machicolated square turret. | I |
| Pedestal in the southwest corner of the South Parterre; 54.11901°N 0.90550°W | | c. 1720 | The pedestal in the grounds of Castle Howard is in sandstone, about 4.5 metres (15 ft) high, and was designed by Nicholas Hawksmoor. It has a central rectangular pier on which is a drum pedestal, flanked by rectangular buttresses with raised panels, each carrying an urn with festoons and a finial on a shaped base. It has a moulded base and cornices and carries a statue of wrestlers. | I |
| Pedestal and Statue of Spinario; 54.11919°N 0.90419°W | | c. 1720 | The pedestal in the grounds of Castle Howard in the southeast corner of the South Parterre is in sandstone, about 4.5 metres (15 ft) high, and was designed by Nicholas Hawksmoor. It has a central rectangular pier on which is a drum pedestal, flanked by rectangular buttresses with raised panels, each carrying an urn with festoons and a finial on a shaped base. The base and cornices are moulded. On the pedestal is a statue in lead of Spinario, a boy seated and removing a thorn from his foot. | I |
| Pedestal about 100 metres west of the Temple of Four Winds; 54.12075°N 0.89864°W | | c. 1720 | The pedestal in the grounds of Castle Howard is in sandstone. It is approached by two steps and has a moulded base. On the sides are sunken panels with garlands carved in relief, and it has an egg-and-dart cornice. The pedestal is surmounted by the statue of a gladiator. | II* |
| Pedestal about 150 metres west of the Temple of Four Winds; 54.12078°N 0.89939°W | | c. 1720 | The pedestal in the grounds of Castle Howard is in sandstone. It has a moulded base, on two steps, and sunken panels containing garlands carved in relief, and an egg-and-dart cornice. The pedestal is surmounted by a statue of Belvedere Antinous. | II* |
| Pedestal about 90 metres south of the Atlas Fountain; 54.11942°N 0.90537°W | | c. 1720 | The pedestal in the grounds of Castle Howard is in sandstone and is 2.5 metres (8 ft 2 in) high. It has a square three-course base, and a drum pedestal with a moulded base and cornice, and festoons. The pedestal is surmounted by a statue of a dancing faun with cymbals. | II |
| Statue of a satyr with dog and grapes, and pedestal 54.12140°N 0.90395°W | | c. 1720 | The pedestal in the grounds of Castle Howard is in sandstone, and is 2.25 metres (7 ft 5 in) high on a plinth. It is on two steps and has a moulded base, sunken panels containing garlands carved in relief, and an egg-and-dart cornice. The statue is in lead, and depicts a satyr holding a bunch of grapes with a dog at his feet. | II* |
| Statue of a faun with a kid and pedestal 54.12064°N 0.90649°W | | c. 1720 | The statue and pedestal are in the South Parterre in the grounds of Castle Howard. The statue is in lead, dating probably from 1723, and by Andrew Carpenter. The pedestal is in sandstone, and has festoons in relief hanging from four consoles at the level of a moulded frieze. The statue depicts a faun carrying a kid on his shoulders propped by an iron bar under the right arm, a copy of a statue in the Prado Museum, Madrid. | II* |
| Statue of Meleager and pedestal 54.12087°N 0.90073°W | | c. 1720 | The statue and pedestal are in Temple Walk in the grounds of Castle Howard, and the statue is in lead. The pedestal is in sandstone, and is about 2.25 metres (7 ft 5 in) high. It has two steps and a moulded base, sunken panels containing garlands carved in relief, and an egg-and-dart cornice. The statue depicts Meleager with a dog, leaning on a tree stump, and is a copy of a statue in the Vatican Museums, Rome. | II* |
| Statue of Silenus with the Infant Bacchus and pedestal 54.12082°N 0.90486°W | | c. 1720 | The pedestal in the grounds of Castle Howard is in sandstone, and is 2.5 metres (8 ft 2 in) high. It has a square base and a drum pedestal with a moulded base and cornice, and festoons. The statue is in lead, it dates from the mid-18th century, and depicts Silenus leaning on a tree trunk and holding the child Bacchus in his arms. It is a copy of a statue in the Louvre, Paris. | II* |
| The Dairies (East House); 54.12409°N 0.90967°W | — | c. 1720 | The house, with two pavilions and a connecting wall to the left, were designed by John Vanbrugh, and are in sandstone. The house has a moulded cornice, a low parapet with urns on the corners, and a Welsh slate roof. There are two storeys and three bays. The doorway has an architrave, a decorated pulvinated frieze, and a moulded pediment on consoles. The windows are sashes in architraves, with stepped keystones. The adjacent pavilion has one storey and three bays, and has casement windows and a hipped roof. The connecting wall is coped, and contains a doorway with a flat arch, and the end pavilion has two storeys, a single bay, casement windows and a hipped roof. At the rear is a Venetian window and a pediment. | II* |
| Statue of Farnese Hercules and pedestal 54.12110°N 0.90212°W | | 1723 | The statue and pedestal are in Temple Walk in the grounds of Castle Howard. The statue is in lead, and by Andrew Carpenter. The pedestal is in sandstone, and is about 2.25 metres (7 ft 5 in) high. It has two steps and a moulded base, sunken panels containing garlands carved in relief, and an egg-and-dart cornice. The statue depicts the Farnese Hercules, a copy of a statue in the Museo Archeologico Nazionale, Naples. | II* |
| Walling to park south of the gatehouse 54.11639°N 0.92273°W | | c. 1723 | The walling in the grounds of Castle Howard was designed by John Vanbrugh, and is in limestone. The wall is about 4 metres (13 ft) high, it extends for about 1 mile (1.6 km), and has a plinth, buttresses and tapering upper courses. The wall contains square and circular interval towers of varying designs. | I |
| Gate piers, walls, gates and railings, Ray Wood entrance 54.12241°N 0.90426°W | — | Early 18th century (probable) | The gates and railings are in wrought iron, and the piers and walls are in stone. There are two pairs of square piers on plinths, with sunken panels, moulded cornices and ball finials, and they are joined by low walls, one with railings. In front, the walls are coped and angled, containing seats, and ending in quadrants. | II |
| Victoria Gate, railings and pier 54.12033°N 0.91131°W | | Early 18th century | The pier to the north of the gate is in sandstone, it has a cruciform plan, it is rusticated, and is about 5 metres (16 ft) high. It has a moulded cornice, a pyramidal cap and a pineapple finial. The gates and railings are in wrought iron, and about 4 metres (13 ft) high. Above the gates is an elaborate overthrow surmounted by a crown. | I |
| Gate piers, Walled Garden; 54.11962°N 0.90893°W | | Early 18th century | The gate piers are in limestone and about 5 metres (16 ft) high. Each has a column with pulvinated rustication, an acanthus frieze, and a moulded cornice, and is surmounted by a bead-rimmed urn with foliate scrolls. | II* |
| Statue of Venus de Medici and pedestal, Walled Garden; 54.12057°N 0.90776°W | | Early 18th century | The life-size statue of Venus de' Medici stands on a drum pedestal about 1 metre (3 ft 3 in) high. The pedestal has a moulded base, and has festoons and a moulded cornice. | II* |
| Balustrade and wall 54.11909°N 0.90494°W | — | 1720s | The balustrade and wall are at the south end of the South Parterre of Castle Howard, they are in sandstone, and extend for about 100 metres (330 ft). They turn at the ends to enclose pedestals, between which is an open section with bulbous balusters. The balustrade includes blind sections with fielded panels around the pedestals. | II |
| Reservoir basin and pedestal 54.12275°N 0.90188°W | | 1720s | The reservoir in Ray Wood in the grounds of Castle Howard is a circular basin about 30 metres (98 ft) in diameter. In the centre is a rectangular pedestal on a moulded base, with raised square panels and a moulded cornice. | II* |
| The Temple of the Four Winds and wall 54.12073°N 0.89630°W | | 1725–28 | The building in the Terrace Walk in the grounds of Castle Howard was designed by John Vanbrugh, and is in limestone with a lead roof. The central cella is square, and surrounded by four tetrastyle porticos with pediments and angle urns. It stands on a cruciform podium approached by a flight of eight steps flanked by lead statues. The doorway has an architrave and an elaborately carved head, and is flanked by sash windows in shell niches. Surrounding the building are containing walls, and two flights of steps flanked by a balustrade. The wall has a chamfered plinth and coping, and massive corner buttresses each with a moulded cornice. | I |
| Pyramid in Pretty Wood; 54.11166°N 0.88287°W | — | Before 1727 | The pyramid in the grounds of Castle Howard was designed by Nicholas Hawksmoor. It is in limestone, about 8 metres (26 ft) high, and has a square plinth with a rusticated base and a moulded frieze. The rusticated pyramid stands on the base. | I |
| The Four Faces; 54.10985°N 0.88463°W | | Before 1727 | A statue in Pretty Wood in the grounds of Castle Howard, it is in limestone and about 6 metres (20 ft) high. It has a square plinth with four pulvinated courses, and a rusticated base with raised panels and a moulded cornice. On this is a tapering column, and a bulbous four-cornered sculpture depicting faces, above which is a decorated apex. | I |
| The Pyramid and surrounding piers 54.11365°N 0.90127°W | | 1728 | The pyramid and piers were designed by Nicholas Hawksmoor, and are in limestone. The central pyramid, with sides of about 9 metres (30 ft), stands on a low podium, with some vermiculated rustication. The four surrounding piers each has a square base on a plinth, with a hollow column pierced by oval apertures, and surmounted by a stepped capital. | I |
| The Mausoleum, bastion wall, gates and railings 54.11738°N 0.88890°W | | 1729–42 | The mausoleum was designed by Nicholas Hawksmoor, and the bastion walls were added by Daniel Garrett. It is in sandstone with a lead roof, and consists of a circular mortuary chapel with a crypt on a square plinth, on which is a peristyle of 20 Doric columns and an entablature with a domed roof. The entrance to the crypt has an ornamental wrought iron gate with a channelled lintel and a massive keystone, flanked by pilasters and a double flight of steps. The bastion walls have squared rusticated projections between which are semicircular projections, with Greek key friezes, decorated gates and lancet railings. | I |
| Statue of shepherd boy and pedestal 54.12104°N 0.90826°W | — | Early to mid 18th century | The statue is in Broad Walk in the grounds of Castle Howard, it is about 3.5 metres (11 ft) high, and the statue is in lead. The pedestal is in sandstone and is slender, with a moulded base and cornice. On it is the figure of a shepherd boy leaning on a tree stump. | II |
| New River Bridge; 54.11869°N 0.89416°W | | 1744 | The bridge crosses the New River in the grounds of Castle Howard, and was designed by Daniel Garrett. It is in sandstone, and consists of three stepped segmental arches with rusticated voussoirs, the central arch with a mask keystone. The cutwaters have banded rustication, and flanking the central arch are niches in architraves with a pulvinated frieze and consoles supporting a pediment. Over the central arch is a cornice on brackets, a low parapet, and a central balustrade with coping. The approaches are ramped, with balustrading, rusticated piers in the centre, and square-section end piers. | I |
| Statue of Apollo Belvedere and pedestal 54.11951°N 0.90471°W | | Mid 18th century | The statue and pedestal are in the grounds of Castle Howard, the statue is in lead and by John Cheere, and the pedestal is in sandstone. The pedestal is about 2.5 metres (8 ft 2 in) high, it has a square three-course base, and a drum pedestal with a moulded base and cornice, and festoons. The statue depicts Apollo Belvedere and is a copy of a statue by Leochares in the Vatican Museums in Rome. | II* |
| Sundial and pedestal, Walled Garden; 54.12046°N 0.90837°W | | Mid 18th century | The sundial and pedestal are about 1 metre (3 ft 3 in) high. The pedestal is later, in stone, and is lobed with foliate decoration. The sundial is in bronze, it is incised, and has a delicately-wrought gnomon. | II |
| Low Gaterley stables and hayloft 54.11702°N 0.87937°W | — | Mid to late 18th century | The building is in limestone, and has a Welsh slate roof with gable coping. There are two storeys and five bays. In the ground floor are three stable doors, and windows, including a two-light horizontally-sliding sash, and the upper floor contains three fixed-light openings. On the right gable end are stone steps leading to the hayloft incorporating a round-arched dog kennel. | II |
| Carved fruit basket and pedestal (northwest), The Boar Garden; 54.12164°N 0.90756°W | — | Mid to late 18th century | The carving and the pedestal, which is later, are in sandstone, and about 3 metres (9.8 ft) high. Two steps lead to the shaped pedestal, which is on lion's paws, and has a shaped cornice. The carved fruit basket is carried on four consoles. | II |
| Vase and pedestal (northwest), The Boar Garden; 54.12149°N 0.90784°W | — | Mid to late 18th century | The vase and pedestal are in sandstone, and about 3 metres (9.8 ft) high. A step leads up to the pedestal, which has a moulded base, blind fielded panels and festoons to the chamfered angles, an acanthus frieze, and a moulded cornice. On the pedestal is a tall narrow vase on a fluted stem, with swags in relief and a gadrooned rim. | II |
| Vase and pedestal (southwest), The Boar Garden; 54.12119°N 0.90770°W | — | Mid to late 18th century | The vase and pedestal are in sandstone, and about 3 metres (9.8 ft) high. A step leads up to the pedestal, which has a moulded base, sunken panels containing swags in relief and a moulded cornice. On the pedestal is a tall narrow vase on a fluted stem, with swags and a gadrooned rim. | II |
| Statue of Wild Boar and pedestal, The Boar Garden; 54.12140°N 0.90745°W | | 1768 (purchased) | The statue is in marble on a sandstone pedestal. The pedestal is rectangular on two steps, with a moulded base and cornice, and contains panels with designs in relief. The statue of a seated wild boar is a copy of a statue in the Uffizi, Florence. | II* |
| Urn and pedestal (northeast), The Boar Garden; 54.12160°N 0.90720°W | — | Mid to late 18th century | The urn and pedestal are in sandstone, and about 3 metres (9.8 ft) high. The pedestal is on two steps, it has a moulded base and cornice, and contains panels with frosted rustication. The urn is globular, and has festoons and a floral finial. | II |
| Urn and pedestal (southeast), The Boar Garden; 54.12131°N 0.90707°W | — | Mid to late 18th century | The urn and pedestal are in sandstone, and about 3 metres (9.8 ft) high. The pedestal is on two steps, it has a moulded base and cornice, and contains panels with frosted rustication. The urn is globular, and has festoons and a floral finial. | II |
| The Stables; 54.12038°N 0.91144°W | | 1774–|81 | The stables were designed by John Carr, and are in limestone with hipped Westmorland slate roofs, forming four ranges around a quadrangle. The main range has two storeys and nine bays with a continuous impost band, and single-storey extensions at the ends. The middle three bays are in Tuscan style, and contain a tall arch flanked by sash windows with radial glazing. The corner pavilions have sash windows flanked by flat buttresses with paterae friezes and ball finials, clasping a coped parapet with blind balustrading to the centre. In the upper floor are sash windows, a balustrade over the middle three bays, and a central panel with swags and paterae, vases at each end, and a central urn flanked by dogs. | I |
| Former bone grinding mill, Low Gaterley Farm; 54.11714°N 0.88022°W | | Late 18th century | The grinding mill, later a barn, is in limestone and has a Welsh slate roof with gable coping. There are two storeys and five bays. In the ground floor are double doors under an elliptical arch, the upper floor contains a pitching door, and in both floors are fixed windows with wedge lintels. | II |
| Low Gaterley Smithy; 54.11680°N 0.87893°W | — | Late 18th century | The smithy is in limestone, with a stepped eaves course, and a hipped Welsh slate roof. There is a single storey, three bays, and an outshut on the right. The smithy contains double doors under a massive timber lintel, and a blocked window with a wedge lintel and a keystone. | II |
| Pump in the stable yard 54.12058°N 0.91157°W | | Late 18th century | The pump in the stable yard of Castle Howard is in limestone and wood, and about 2 metres (6 ft 7 in) high. It has a square base with a chamfered plinth, and a wooden pier with sunken panels and a low band. This tapers to a moulded cornice, and is surmounted by a lamp. | II |
| Medici Vase and pedestal 54.12197°N 0.90164°W | | 1778 (purchased) | The vase in the grounds of Castle Howard was made by the Coade Company in Coade stone, and is a copy of the Medici Vase in the Uffizi Gallery, Florence. It is decorated with figures representing the sacrifice of Iphigenia. The vase stands on a sandstone base, about 3.5 metres (11 ft) high, with waterleaf decoration to the base, sunk panels, one with a Latin inscription, the others with antique medallions, and a moulded cornice. | II* |
| Low Gaterley Farmhouse; 54.11673°N 0.87934°W | | Late 18th to early 19th century | The farmhouse is in limestone with a Welsh slate roof. There are two storeys, three bays, and a rear cross-wing. The doorway is in the centre, the windows are sashes, and all the openings have wedge lintels with keystones. | II |
| Kylix and pedestal northeast of the Atlas Fountain; 54.12079°N 0.90512°W | — | Early 19th century | The kylix and pedestal in the grounds of Castle Howard are in sandstone, and about 3 metres (9.8 ft) high. The pedestal has one step, a moulded base, sunken panels with waterleaf borders, a quadripartite acanthus motif in the centre, and a bead and ovolo frieze with an egg-and-dart moulded cornice. This is surmounted by a fluted kylix with a lipped rim. | II |
| Kylix and pedestal northwest of the Atlas Fountain; 54.12065°N 0.90617°W | | Early 19th century | The kylix and pedestal in the grounds of Castle Howard are in sandstone, and about 3 metres (9.8 ft) high. The pedestal has one step, a moulded base, sunken panels with waterleaf borders, a quadripartite acanthus motif in the centre, and a bead and ovolo frieze with an egg-and-dart moulded cornice. This is surmounted by a fluted kylix with a lipped rim. | II |
| Plant container north-northwest of the Atlas Fountain; 54.12090°N 0.90620°W | — | Early 19th century (probable) | The plant container in the grounds of Castle Howard is in limestone and has an oval plan. Two steps lead up to a concave gadrooned base with beaded moulding. On this is a convex gadrooned plant container decorated with acanthus leaves. | II |
| Plant container north of the Atlas Fountain; 54.12102°N 0.90533°W | — | Early 19th century (probable) | The plant container in the grounds of Castle Howard is in limestone and has an oval plan. Two steps lead up to a concave gadrooned base with beaded moulding. On this is a convex gadrooned plant container decorated with acanthus leaves. | II |
| Vase and pedestal north-east of the Atlas Fountain; 54.12107°N 0.90498°W | — | Early 19th century (probable) | The vase and pedestal are in sandstone and about 3 metres (9.8 ft) high. The pedestal is on two steps, it has a moulded base and cornice, and contains blind fielded panels. The vase is ovoid on a fluted base, and has a lipped rim carrying a vine scroll. | II |
| Vase and pedestal east of the Atlas Fountain; 54.12036°N 0.90500°W | — | Early 19th century (probable) | The vase and pedestal are in sandstone and about 3 metres (9.8 ft) high. The pedestal is on two steps, it has a moulded base and cornice, and contains blind fielded panels. The vase is ovoid on a fluted base, and has a lipped rim carrying a vine scroll. | II |
| Vase and pedestal west of the Atlas Fountain; 54.12023°N 0.90586°W | — | Early 19th century (probable) | The vase and pedestal are in sandstone and about 3 metres (9.8 ft) high. The pedestal is on two steps, it has a moulded base and cornice, and contains blind fielded panels. The vase is ovoid on a fluted base, and has a lipped rim carrying a vine scroll. | II |
| Vase and pedestal east-northeast of the Atlas Fountain; 54.12057°N 0.90475°W | — | Early 19th century (probable) | The vase and pedestal are in sandstone and about 3 metres (9.8 ft) high. The pedestal is on two steps, it has a moulded base and cornice, and contains blind fielded panels. The vase is ovoid on a fluted base, and has a lipped rim carrying a vine scroll. | II |
| Statue of a figure playing a lyre and pedestal 54.11894°N 0.90628°W | | Early 19th century | The statue in Lime Walk in the grounds of Castle Howard is in sandstone, and about 5 metres (16 ft) high. The pedestal is pyramidal, and carved to suggest a craggy mountain with trees, ruins and a stream, and on it is a plaque inscribed with a poem. Standing on the pedestal is a figure in loose drapes holding a lyre. | II* |
| The Aviaries; 54.11518°N 0.91019°W | — | Early 19th century | A house in the grounds of Castle Howard, with a square plan, two storeys, two bays, and a hipped roof. It has two blind arches with an impost band, containing two-light horizontally-sliding sash windows in the ground floor, and elliptical-arched casement windows in the soffits in the upper floor. | II |
| The Dairies (Western House and coach-house); 54.12352°N 0.91142°W | — | Early 19th century | The house and coach house are in limestone under a hipped Westmorland] slate roof. The coach house to the left has two storeys and six bays, and contains a blind arcade with round arches and an impost band. The doorway has a fanlight, and the windows have fixed lights. The house has two storeys and two bays, and overhanging eaves. The round-arched doorway has a rusticated surround and a fanlight, and the windows are sashes. | II |
| Gardener's Cottage, Walled Garden; 54.11993°N 0.90866°W | | Early 19th century | The house is in limestone, with a moulded cornice, a low blind parapet, and a hipped Welsh slate roof. There are two storeys, a square plan, and three bays, the middle bay projecting under a pediment. The central doorway has a canopy on carved consoles. The windows are sashes, and all the openings have moulded architraves. | II* |
| Kylix and pedestal, Irish Yew Garden; 54.11899°N 0.90705°W | | 1845 | Standing in the gardens of Castle Howard, the kylix is in limestone and the pedestal is in sandstone, and the structure is about 3 metres (9.8 ft) high. The pedestal has a moulded base, and on each side is an inscription. Above is a bead-and-reel frieze and a moulded egg-and-dart cornice, surmounted by a fluted kylix with foliate decoration. | II |
| Atlas Fountain and pond 54.12023°N 0.90541°W | | 1850 | The fountain to the south of Castle Howard was designed by William Andrews Nesfield, and the figures were made by John Thomas. The figures are in Portland stone, and depict four Tritons blowing water over Atlas, who is kneeling on a central pedestal and carrying a bronze globe. The fountain is surrounded by a pond with a diameter of about 27 metres (89 ft). | I |
| Cascade; 54.11967°N 0.89750°W | — | c. 1850 | The cascade was designed by William Andrews Nesfield, and is in millstone grit. It links South Lake in the grounds of Castle Howard with a lower pool. The upper pool has a square plan with rounded corners, and the lower pool is square. The cascade has rusticated bands, and low chamfered side walls ending in square piers with stepped cornices. | II |
| Pedestal south of South Lake; 54.11934°N 0.90298°W | — | Mid 19th century | The pedestal in the grounds of Castle Howard is in sandstone, and is about 2 metres (6 ft 7 in) high. It stands on a square stepped base, and has moulded concave sides on a cushion pad, and a moulded cornice. | II |
| Chimney stack, Walled Garden; 54.12013°N 0.91049°W | | Mid to late 19th century | The chimney stack to the former greenhouse is in sandstone and about 9 metres (30 ft) high. There are three stages on a three-course plinth with a moulded base. In each stage are panels with rock-faced rustication. The bottom stage has a row of circular flues, modillions and a moulded cornice, and the upper stages are divided by a band with a circular motif. | II |
