= Atlas Fountain =

- Atlas Fountain at Castle Howard

- Location in North Yorkshire
- 54.12018°N 0.90537°W
- Location: Castle Howard, North Yorkshire, England
- OS grid reference: SE 71644 69921

History
- Built: 1853
- Built for: George Howard, 7th Earl of Carlisle

Site notes
- Architect(s): William Andrews Nesfield and John Thomas
- Restored: 2012
- Restored by: The Earth Stone and Lime

Listed Building – Grade I
- Designated: 22 June 1987
- Reference no.: 1148973

The Atlas Fountain stands in the grounds of Castle Howard, North Yorkshire, England. It has been designated a Grade I listed building and is now recorded in the National Heritage List for England, maintained by Historic England.

== History ==
The Atlas Fountain and pond dates from 1850. There are claims it was exhibited at The Great Exhibition prior to installation; however that was a different fountain by John Thomas (surmounted by Acis & Galatea, rather than Atlas) which was subsequently installed at Preston Hall, Aylesford.

The Atlas Fountain was designed by William Andrews Nesfield and the sculpted figures were carved in Portland stone by John Thomas who was paid £1183 10s 3d (equivalent to £130,010 in 2025) for his work. The figures were transported by rail from London to Castle Howard railway station.

The tazza, pedestals, shells and basin were made by local craftsmen. The water engineering was completed by James Easton, taking water from a stream in Coneysthorpe and using a steam engine to pump it uphill to the Ray Wood reservoir.

The fountain was turned on for the first time in October 1853.

The fountain was overhauled in 1983 and again by The Earth Stone and Lime in 2012.

== Description ==
A large globe of bronze dominates the fountain supported on the shoulders of Atlas. Four recumbent Tritons blow water through shells over Atlas kneeling on a pedestal in the central tazza. Other jets fill the lower scallop shell basins, which overflow into the central basin producing a dramatic cascade of white water.

The fountain is fed from the half-million gallon Ray Wood reservoir, to the east of the main house. Gravity feeds water into a chamber beneath the pond basin where pipes direct it to the main outlets in the Triton's shells.

The pond is approximately 27 metres (89 ft) in diameter.

The fountain and the pond.

The fountain, with Castle Howard in the background

== See also ==
- Grade I listed buildings in North Yorkshire (district)
- Listed buildings in Henderskelfe
