= Ray Wood, Castle Howard =

Wood in Henderskelfe, North Yorkshire, England

Coordinates: 54°07′26″N 0°54′00″W

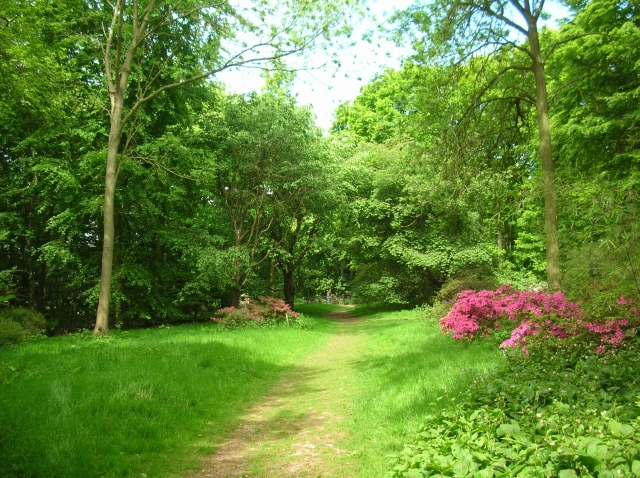
Trees and rhododendrons in the wood

Ray Wood is a woodland area of the Castle Howard estate in North Yorkshire, in England. It contains several historic structures.

== History ==
Originally known as "Wray Wood", it was first recorded in the 16th century. In 1699, George London was commissioned to landscape the woodland, planning to cut radial avenues through it. This plan was not pursued, and instead in 1705 a more naturalistic labyrinth design of paths was created, probably to a design by either Nicholas Hawksmoor or John Vanbrugh. From 1706 to 1710, a boundary wall, summer house, fountains, statues, seats and steps were constructed. It became a popular place for visitors to the estate to stroll. Stephen Switzer was particularly enthusiastic about the wood, describing it as "this incomparable wood, the highest pitch that natural and polite gardening can ever possibly ascribe to... 'tis there that nature is truly imitated, if not excelled".

In the mid-18th century, most of the features were removed, retaining only the plinths of some statues, and the statue of Apollo. There was a small reservoir at the bottom of the wood, which was rebuilt on a larger scale in the 1850s, to feed the new Atlas Fountain. The wood was all felled in the 1940s and replanted in 1946 with hardwoods. The paths were restored from 1968 to 1975, and James Russell then introduced new planting. The walls were restored in 2007.

== Architecture ==
=== Gates and railings ===
The grade II* listed gates and railings probably date from the early 18th century. They are in wrought iron, and the piers and walls are in stone. There are two pairs of square piers on plinths, with sunken panels, moulded cornices and ball finials, and they are joined by low walls, one with railings. In front, the walls are coped and angled, containing seats, and ending in quadrants.

=== Reservoir ===
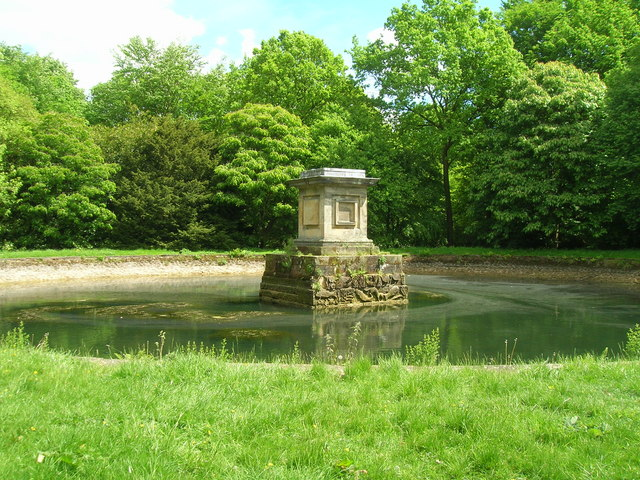
The reservoir, with water levels low enough to show the carvings

The reservoir is grade II* listed. It is a circular basin about 30 metres (98 ft) in diameter. In the centre is a rectangular pedestal on a moulded base, with raised square panels and a moulded cornice. There are carvings of water creatures and plants on the pedestal, which are usually underwater.

=== Medici Vase ===
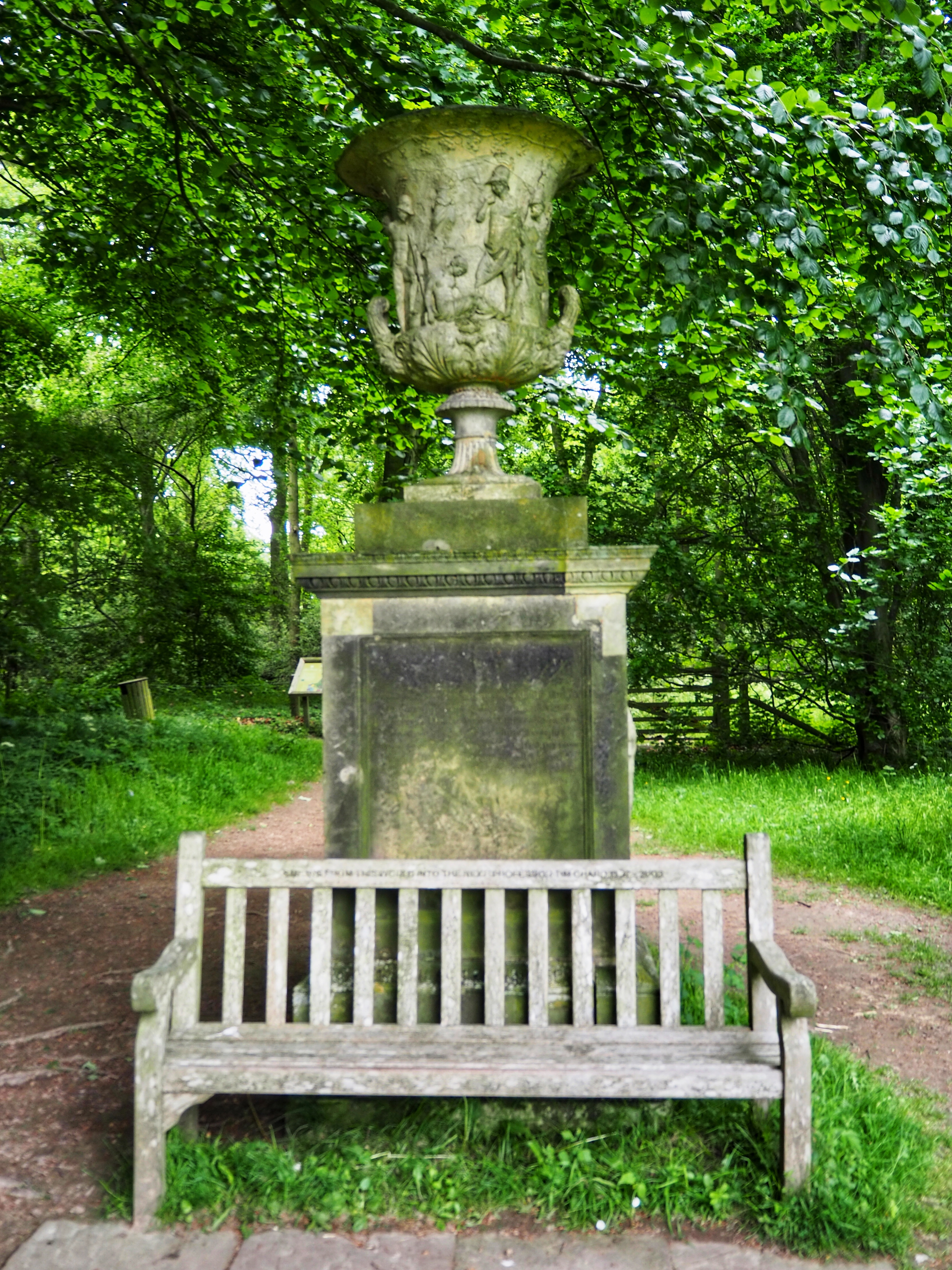
The Medici Vase

The grade II* listed Medici Vase was made by the Coade Company in Coade stone, and purchased by the estate in 1778. It is a copy of the Medici Vase in the Uffizi Gallery, Florence. It is decorated with figures representing the sacrifice of Iphigenia. The vase stands on a sandstone base, about 3.5 metres (11 ft) high, with waterleaf decoration to the base, sunk panels, one with a Latin inscription, the others with antique medallions, and a moulded cornice.

=== Pyramid ===
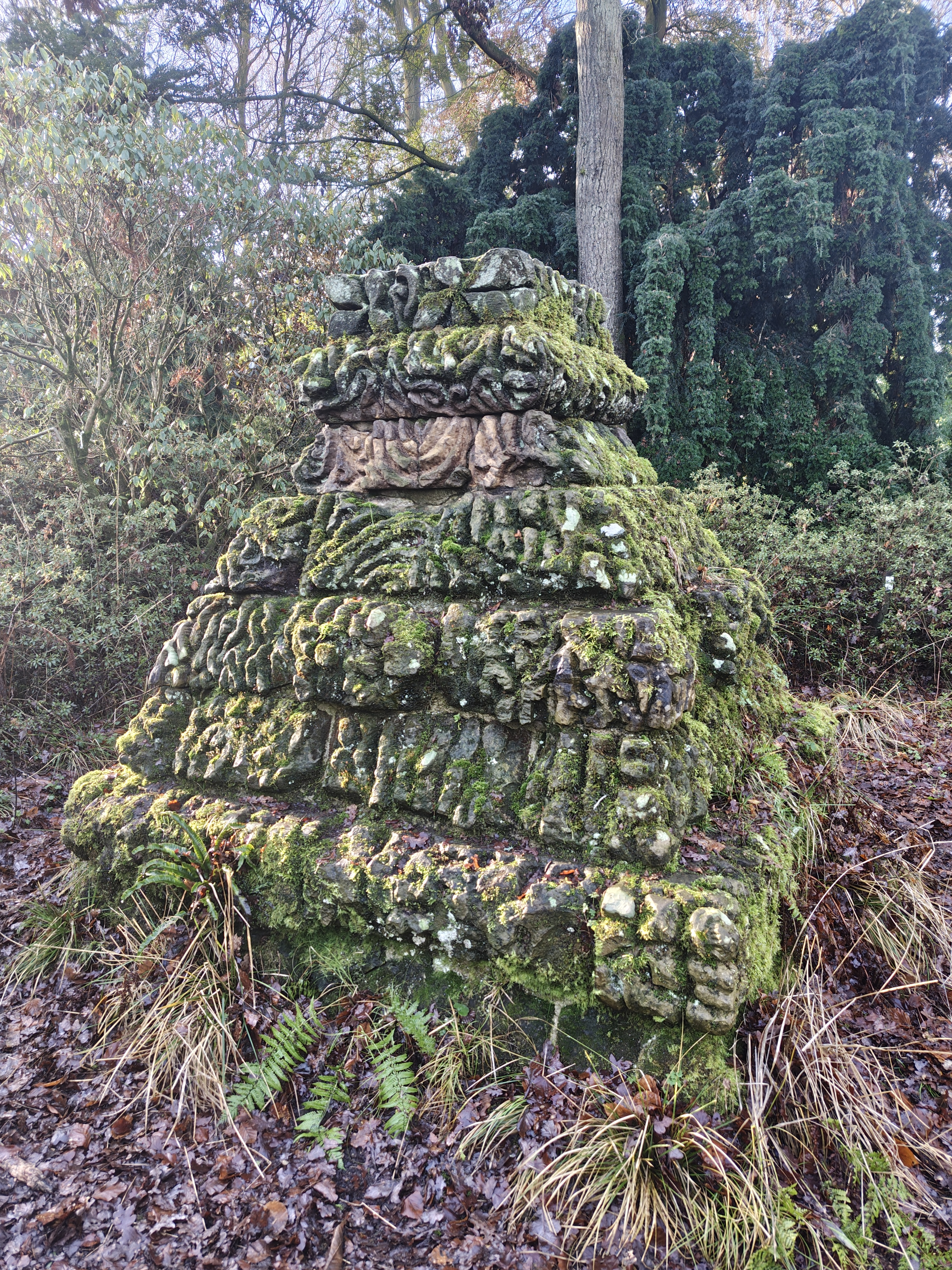
The "Aztec" Pyramid

The pyramid is a roughly-placed collection of stones in a central clearing in the wood. The stones are believed to have been part of the original early-18th century ornamental features, which were demolished and later reassembled by gardeners, probably in a new form.

== See also ==
- Grade II* listed buildings in North Yorkshire (district)
- Listed buildings in Henderskelfe
