= The Yorkshire Arboretum =

Arboretum near Malton, North Yorkshire

The Castle Howard Arboretum
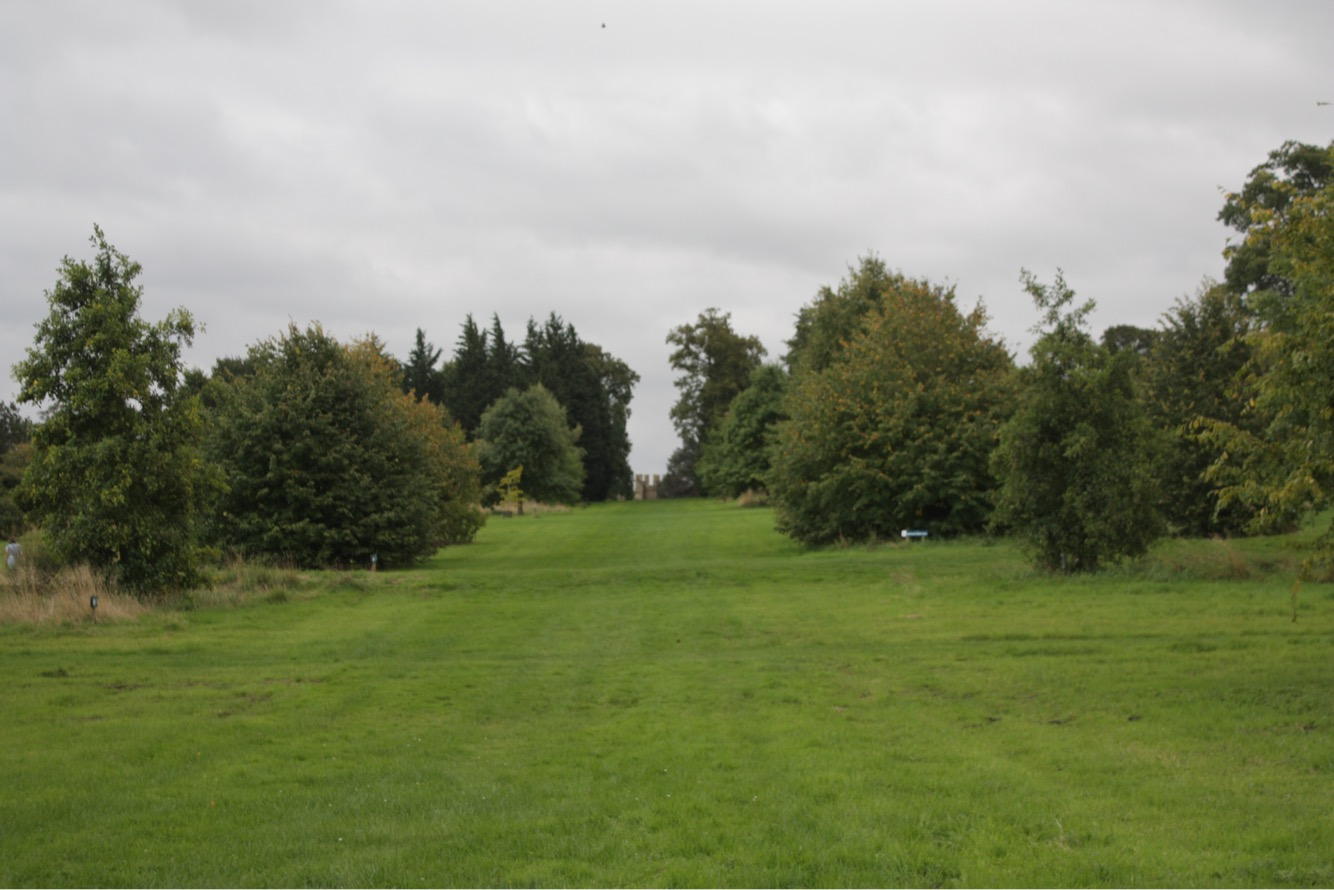
- View of the Main Vista at The Castle Howard Arboretum from near the arboretum lake, September 2017

- Location within North Yorkshire
- Type: Arboretum
- Location: North Yorkshire, England
- Coordinates: 54°7′14″N 0°54′42″W
- Area: 128 acres (52 hectares)
- Species: > 6,000
- Website: www.yorkshirearboretum.org

The Castle Howard Arboretum is an arboretum situated near Malton in North Yorkshire, England. It is run as a joint enterprise between Castle Howard Estates and Royal Botanic Gardens, Kew. Originating in 1979, it comprises more than 7,000 trees, including some that are rare or endangered, across a site of 128 acres (52 hectares).

== Walling ==
The walling to the south of the arboretum was designed by John Vanbrugh, and is in limestone. The wall is about 4 metres (13 ft) high, it extends for about 1 mile (1.6 km), and has a plinth, buttresses and tapering upper courses. The wall contains square and circular interval towers of varying designs. It is grade I listed.

== See also ==
- Grade I listed buildings in North Yorkshire (district)
- Listed buildings in Henderskelfe
