= Temple of the Four Winds =

Building in Castle Howard, North Yorkshire, England

Coordinates: 54°07′14″N 0°53′47″W

The building, in 2026

The Temple of the Four Winds is a historic building in the grounds of Castle Howard, in North Yorkshire, in England.

== History ==
The temple was designed by John Vanbrugh, who also designed the house at Castle Howard. Its design was inspired by the Villa La Rotonda, and it was intended as a space for reading and writing, with a cellar below for servants to prepare food. It was constructed between 1724 and 1726, being completed after Vanbrugh's death. Dan Harvey carved the stone doorhead, and the statues may be by John Nost. The building was completed with plasterwork applied from 1737 to 1739, by Francesco Vassali.

The building, in 2026

The temple was originally dedicated to Diana, and there was a corresponding Temple of Venus further down the hill, which is now ruined. The Temple of the Four Winds is atop the hill, crowning a purpose-built terrace. It is described by Martin Calder as "remind[ing] the viewer that here winds blowing off the North Sea meet the winds from the Atlantic".

The building was restored in the 1950s and grade I listed in 1954. Its steps were restored in 2001, and the structure is now regularly used to host weddings. In both the film and television adaptations of Brideshead Revisited, it was used to film a scene showing characters spending a day indulging in wine tasting.

== Architecture ==
Detail of one of the fronts

The building is constructed of limestone with a lead roof. The central cella is square, and surrounded by four tetrastyle porticos with pediments and angle urns. It stands on a cruciform podium approached by a flight of eight steps flanked by lead statues of sibyls. The doorway has an architrave and an elaborately carved head, and is flanked by sash windows in shell niches. There is a domed roof with an octagonal window, topped by a lantern. Surrounding the building are containing walls, and two flights of steps flanked by a balustrade. The wall has a chamfered plinth and coping, and massive corner buttresses each with a moulded cornice. Inside the building, the niches above the doors contain busts of Vespasian, Faustina, Trajan and Sabina. The flooring is of Portland stone inlaid with coloured marble, while the columns and architraves are in black and gold scagliola.

== Temple Terrace ==
The terrace on which the temple sits was designed by Vanbrugh, but may contain remains of Mediaeval castle walls. It slopes upward, away from the house, and curves, the design intended to obscure views of the temple until the viewer is nearby. Along its route are five statues, each of which is grade II* listed.

=== Statue of a satyr with dog and grapes ===
The statue is in lead, and depicts a satyr — sometimes identified as Bacchus — holding a bunch of grapes with a dog at his feet. Its pedestal is made of sandstone, and is 2.25 metres (7 ft 5 in) high on a plinth. It is on two steps and has a moulded base, sunken panels containing garlands carved in relief, and an egg-and-dart cornice.

=== Statue of the Farnese Hercules ===
Statue of the Farnese Hercules, with Castle Howard in the background

The statue depicts the Farnese Hercules, a copy of a statue in the Museo Archeologico Nazionale, Naples. It is made of lead, and was sculpted by Andrew Carpenter. The pedestal is in sandstone, and is about 2.25 metres (7 ft 5 in) high. It has two steps and a moulded base, sunken panels containing garlands carved in relief, and an egg-and-dart cornice.

=== Statue of Meleager ===
The statue depicts Meleager with a dog, leaning on a tree stump, and is a copy of a statue in the Vatican Museums, Rome. The statue is in lead, while the pedestal is in sandstone, and is about 2.25 metres (7 ft 5 in) high. It has two steps and a moulded base, sunken panels containing garlands carved in relief, and an egg-and-dart cornice.

=== Statue of Belvedere Antinous ===
The statue of Belvedere Antinous is atop a sandstone pedestal. It has a moulded base, on two steps, and sunken panels containing garlands carved in relief, and an egg-and-dart cornice. It is grade II* listed and is about 150m west of the temple.

=== Statue of the Borghese Gladiator ===
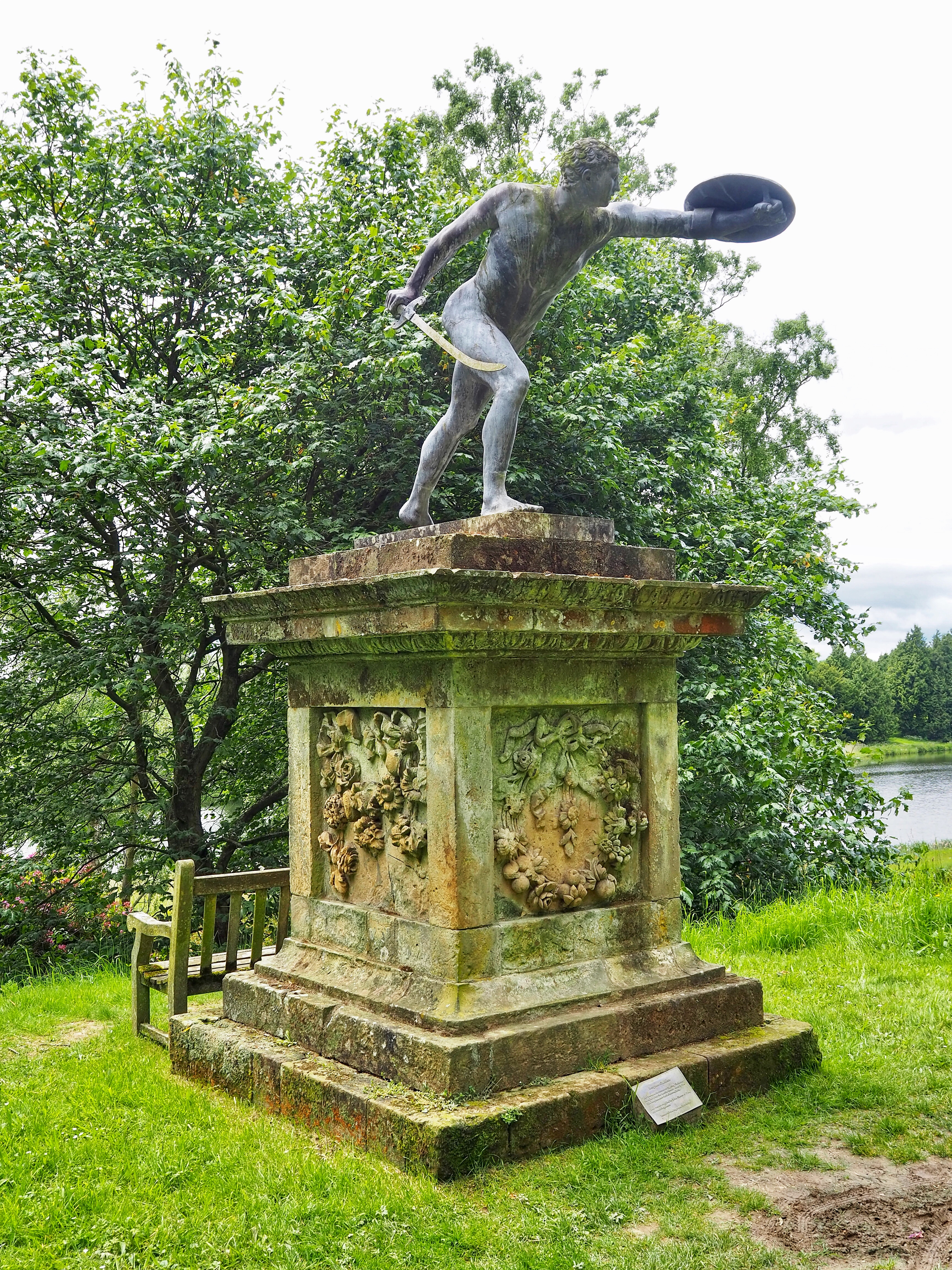
Statue of the Borghese Gladiator

The last statue reached before the temple, about 100m to its west, it of a gladiator. It is on a standstone pedestal approached by two steps and has a moulded base. On the sides are sunken panels with garlands carved in relief, and it has an egg-and-dart cornice.

== See also ==
- Grade I listed buildings in North Yorkshire (district)
- Listed buildings in Henderskelfe
