= Walled Garden, Castle Howard =

Garden of Castle Howard, North Yorkshire, England

Coordinates: 54.1198°N 0.9091°W

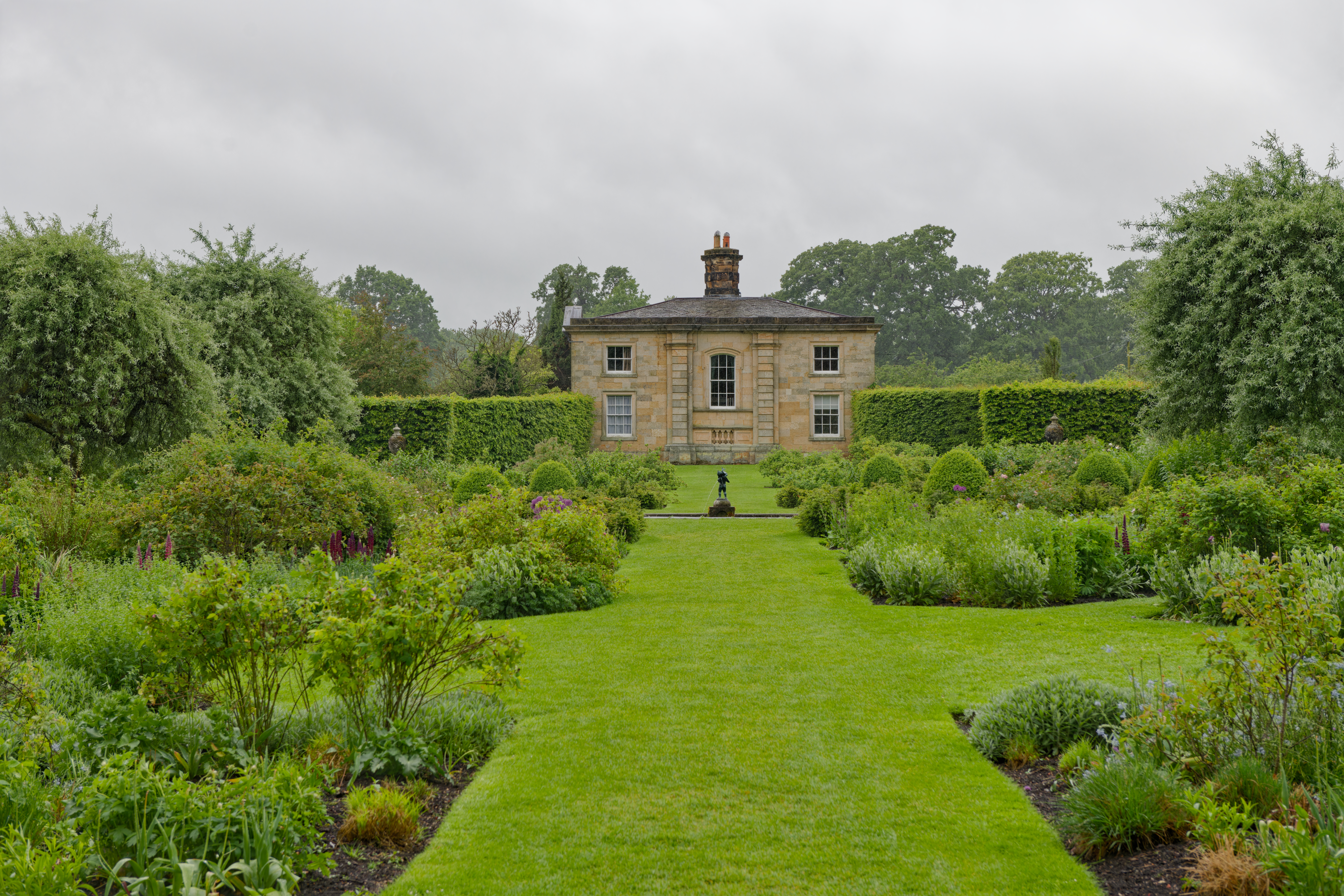
View west in the Walled Garden, towards the Gardener's Cottage

The Walled Garden is a historic garden at Castle Howard, in North Yorkshire, in England. It contains several notable structures.

== History ==
Work on the current Castle Howard building began in 1701, and the Walled Garden was the first of its gardens to be created. It was first recorded in 1703, when the Gardener's House and a kitchen garden were constructed. It was built by the mason William Smith, and in 1705 the Satyr Gate was added, designed by Samuel Carpenter. The garden was enlarged in the 1740s, and then to the designs of Thomas Robinson in the late 1750s. This increased the area of the garden from 3 acres to more than 9 acres. Robinson also added heated walls, a conservatory, and a new entrance gate.

A view inside the Walled Garden

In the early 20th century, a new conservatory was added, along with a boiler room and chimney, and 19 greenhouses. The garden design was simplified, and over the course of the century, much of the garden fell into disuse. In the 1970s, three rose garden areas were created by James Russell. A garden centre was created at the west end of the garden in the 1990s, and much of the soil in the Sundial and Venus areas of the garden was replaced, allowing them to be planted with roses. In 2006, an ornamental vegetable garden area was added.

== Structures ==
=== Satyr Gate and walls ===
The Satyr Gate

The Satyr Gate, completed in 1705, is built of limestone on the west front and brick elsewhere. It contains a round-arched gateway with a rusticated surround, carved satyrs on the exterior, and lions' masks in the interior. Above it is a ramped cornice with a keystone, and carved flower baskets. The gates and overthrow are in wrought iron with scrolling. The garden is enclosed by walls with corner piers, and three major gateways, each with different features. It is grade I listed.

=== Gate piers ===
The grade II*-listed gate piers are also built of limestone and are about 5 metres (16 ft) high. Each has a column with pulvinated rustication, an acanthus frieze, and a moulded cornice, and is surmounted by a bead-rimmed urn with foliate scrolls.

=== Statue of Venus de Medici ===
Statue of Venus de Medici

The life-size statue of Venus de' Medici stands on a drum pedestal about 1 metre (3 ft 3 in) high. The pedestal has a moulded base, and has festoons and a moulded cornice. It is grade II* listed, and dates from the early 18th century.

=== Sundial ===
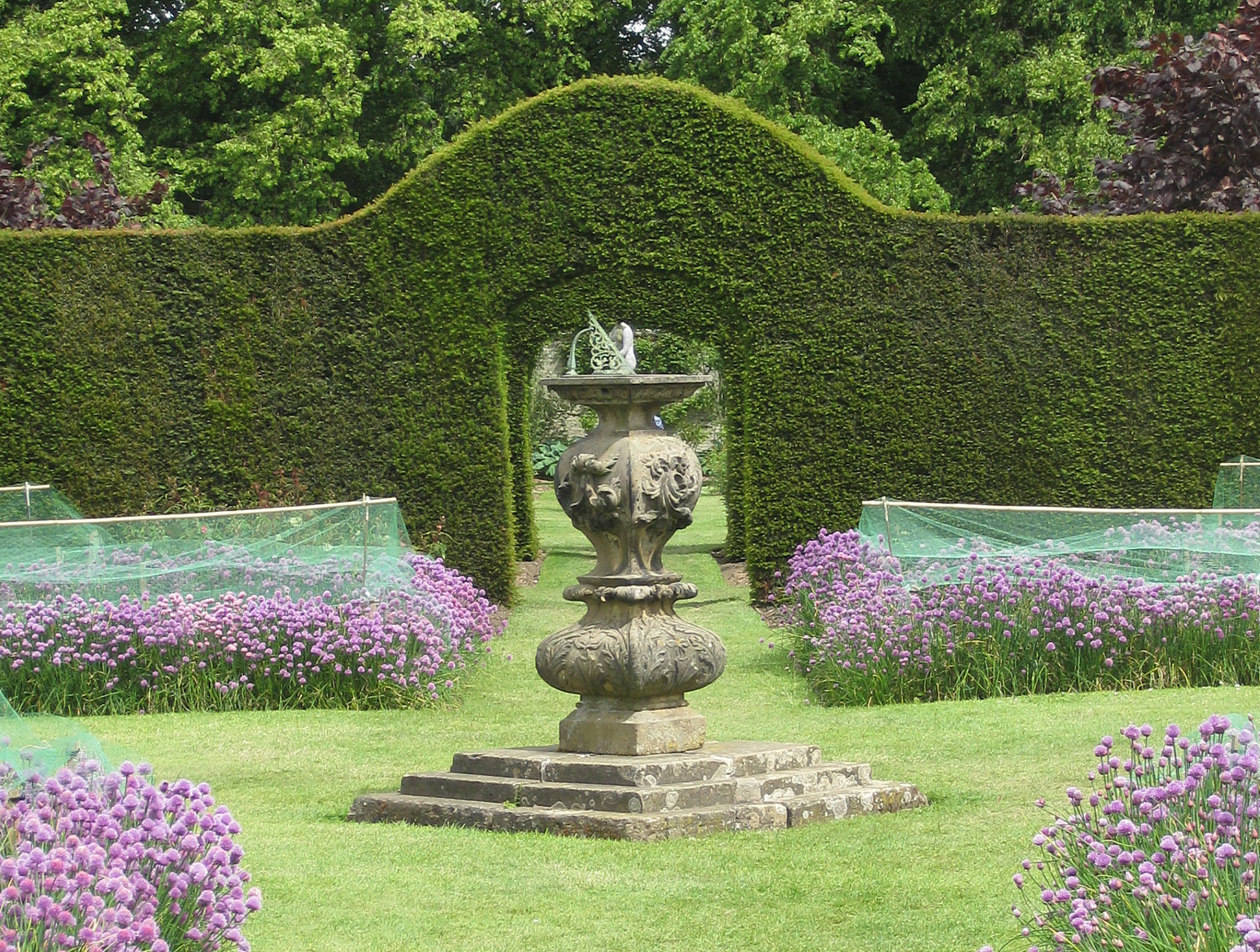
The sundial

The grade II-listed sundial and pedestal are about 1 metre (3 ft 3 in) high. The mid-18th century sundial is in bronze, it is incised, and has a delicately-wrought gnomon. The pedestal is later, in stone, and is lobed with foliate decoration.

=== Gardener's Cottage ===
The house is grade II* listed, and dated from the early 19th century. It is built of limestone, with a moulded cornice, a low blind parapet, and a hipped Welsh slate roof. There are two storeys, a square plan, and three bays, the middle bay projecting under a pediment. The central doorway has a canopy on carved consoles. The windows are sashes, and all the openings have moulded architraves.

=== Chimney ===
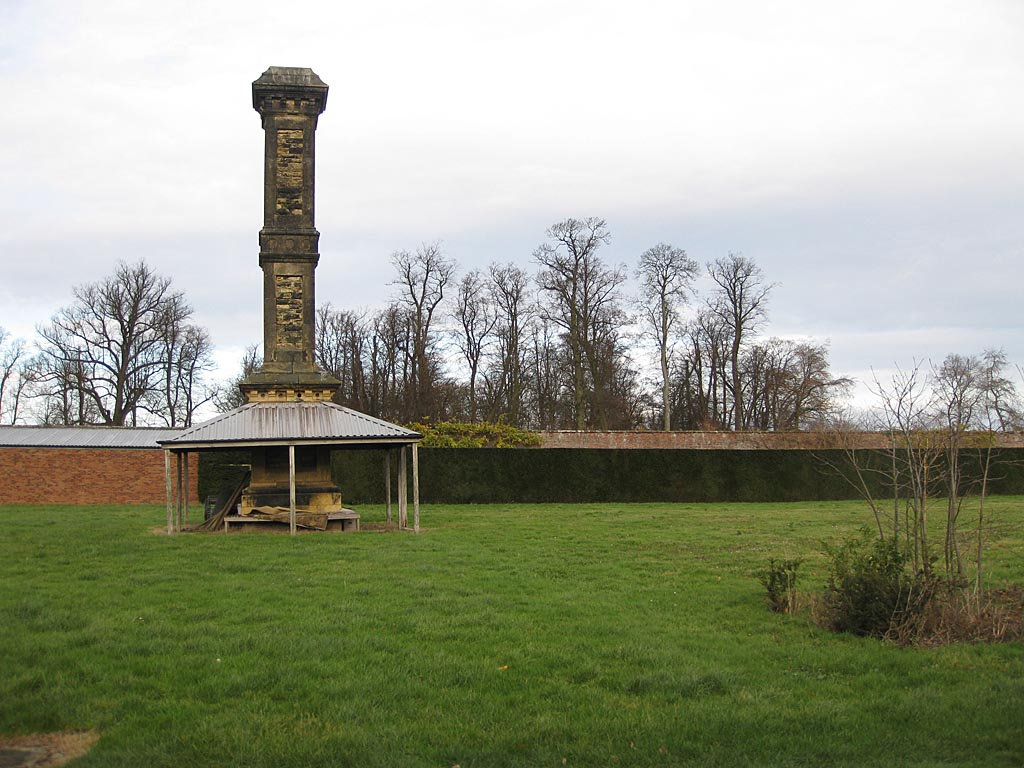
The chimney stack

The chimney stack to the former greenhouse is built of sandstone and about 9 metres (30 ft) high. There are three stages on a three-course plinth with a moulded base. In each stage are panels with rock-faced rustication. The bottom stage has a row of circular flues, modillions and a moulded cornice, and the upper stages are divided by a band with a circular motif. It is grade II listed.

== See also ==
- Grade I listed buildings in North Yorkshire (district)
- Listed buildings in Henderskelfe
