= The Pyramid, Castle Howard =

Listed folly in North Yorkshire, England

The Pyramid
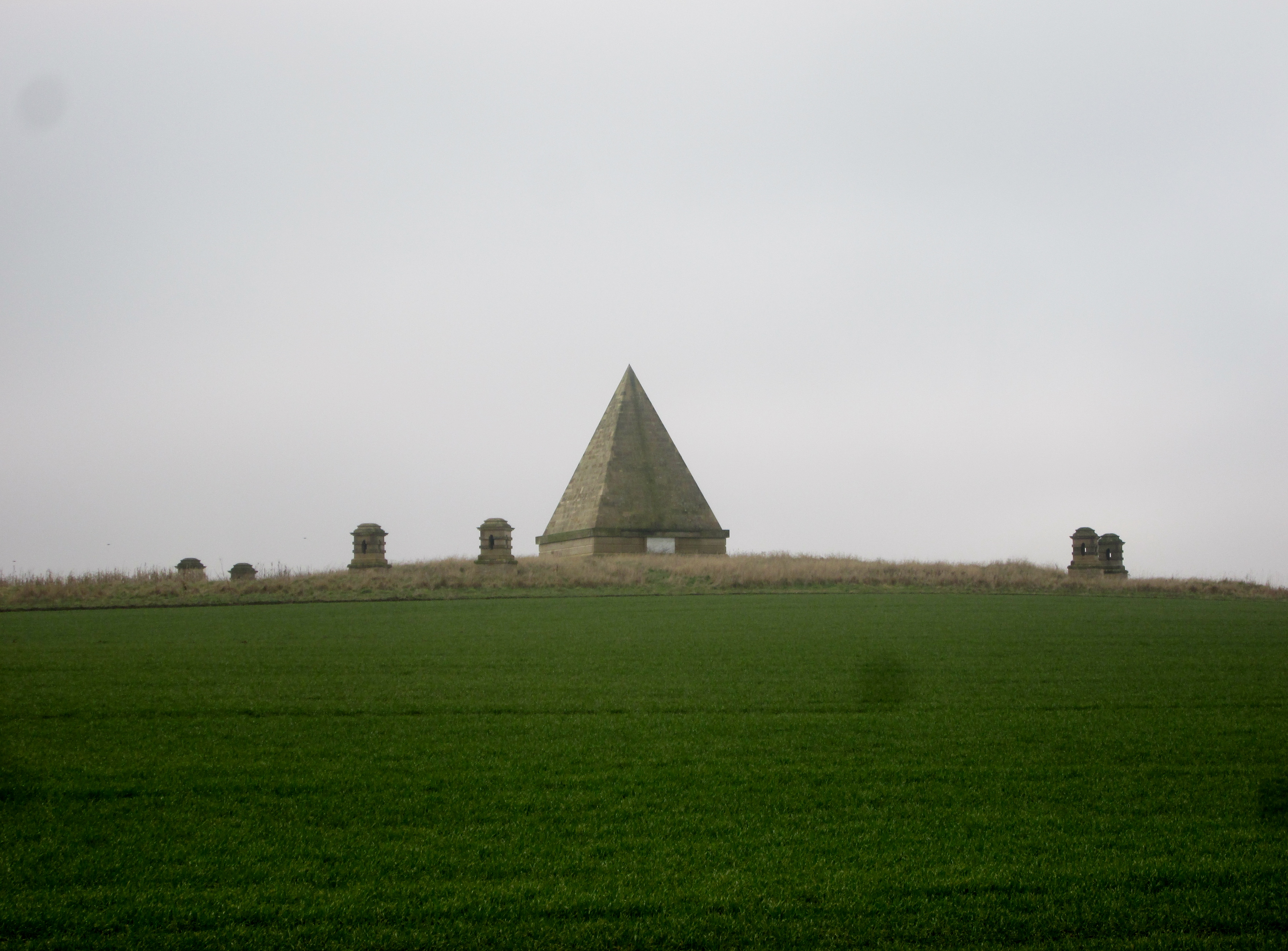
- The Pyramid, in 2017

General information
- Location: Castle Howard estate, North Yorkshire, England
- Coordinates: 54.11359°N 0.90127°W
- Year built: 1728
- Renovated: 2015

Technical details
- Material: Limestone
- Size: 9 m × 9 m (30 ft × 30 ft)

Design and construction
- Architect: Nicholas Hawksmoor
- Designations

Listed Building – Grade I
- Official name: The Pyramid and surrounding piers
- Designated: 25 January 1954
- Reference no.: 1148971

The Pyramid is a folly on the Castle Howard estate, in North Yorkshire, England.

The Pyramid lies on St Anne's Hill, in line with the centre of the house at Castle Howard. It was built in 1728, and was probably designed by Nicholas Hawksmoor. Hawksmoor had already built a pyramid in nearby Pretty Wood, and in 1732 proposed one clad in copper or silver, which remained unbuilt. It was grade I listed in 1954. In 2015 it was restored, the work including rebuilding the apex, replacing vermiculated stone, and cleaning and repointing the facades.

The pyramid and the surrounding piers are built of limestone. The central pyramid, with sides of about 9 metres (30 ft), stands on a low podium, with some vermiculated rustication. The four surrounding piers each has a square base on a plinth, with a hollow column pierced by oval apertures, and surmounted by a stepped capital. Inside the pyramid is a beehive vault containing a large, flat bust of Lord William Howard.

== See also ==
- Grade I listed buildings in North Yorkshire (district)
- Listed buildings in Henderskelfe
