= Castle Howard =

Stately home in North Yorkshire, England

- South (garden) face of Castle Howard

- Location within North Yorkshire
- 54°7′17″N 0°54′21″W
- Type: Stately home
- Location: North Yorkshire, England
- OS grid reference: SE 71635 70088

History
- Built: 1701–1811

Site notes
- Architect(s): John Vanbrugh and Nicholas Hawksmoor
- Architectural style: English Baroque
- Owner: Castle Howard Estate Limited
- Website: castlehoward.co.uk

Listed Building – Grade I
- Official name: Castle Howard and East Court
- Designated: 25 January 1954
- Reference no.: 1316030

National Register of Historic Parks and Gardens
- Official name: Castle Howard
- Designated: 10 May 1984
- Reference no.: 1001059

Castle Howard is an English country house in Henderskelfe, North Yorkshire, 15 miles (24 km) north of York. A private residence, it has been the home of the Carlisle branch of the Howard family for more than 300 years. Castle Howard has been used as a filming location in several films and television shows, including in Granada Television's 1981 television adaptation of Evelyn Waugh's Brideshead Revisited and in a 2008 film adaptation.

== History ==
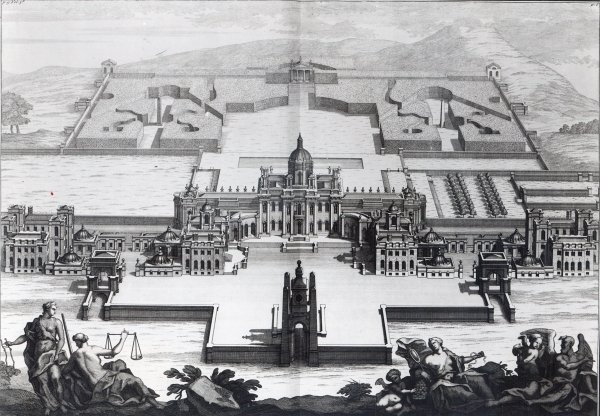
A view of John Vanbrugh's complete project for Castle Howard, from the north, published in the third volume of Vitruvius Britannicus in 1725.

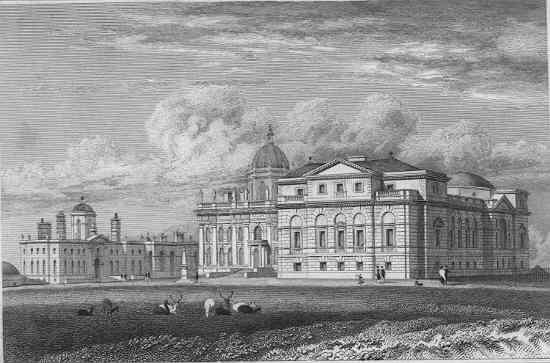
A view of Castle Howard in 1819, from the north-west, showing the contrasting Palladian West Wing at right, which was built in the mid-18th century

In 1577, the 4th Duke of Norfolk's third son, Lord William Howard, married his step-sister Elizabeth Dacre, youngest daughter of the 4th Baron Dacre. She brought with her the sizable estates of Henderskelfe in Yorkshire and Naworth Castle in Cumberland. Castle Howard was commissioned by the 3rd Earl of Carlisle, who was a male-line descendant of Lord William Howard. The site selected was part of the Henderskelfe estate, including the former castle. The creation of Castle Howard, began in 1699, with the start of design work by John Vanbrugh. It was completed with the decoration of the Long Gallery in 1811. Most of the circa 130 ancient sculptures and inscriptions were acquired before 1745 by Henry Howard, 4th Earl of Carlisle, who had inherited the castle—which was architecturally already largely complete—from his father.

The house is surrounded by a large estate which, at the time of the 7th Earl of Carlisle, covered over 13,000 acres (5,300 ha) and included the villages of Welburn, Bulmer, Slingsby, Terrington and Coneysthorpe. The estate was served by its own railway station, Castle Howard station, from 1845 to the 1950s. While attending Girton College during the early Edwardian era, Lady Dorothy Georgiana Howard, the daughter of the 9th Earl and "Radical Countess" of Carlisle, befriended six of her fellow students, including the future archaeologist Gisela Richter and future candidate for Roman Catholic Sainthood Anna Abrikosova. All six were invited by Lady Dorothy to Castle Howard as guests during holidays. After the death of the 9th Earl in 1911, Castle Howard was inherited by his fifth son, Geoffrey Howard, with later earls having Naworth Castle as their northern country house. Henry "Chips" Channon, the diarist and future Conservative MP, visited Castle Howard in August 1923 and recounted in his diary that "The house is uncomfortable in the extreme and is badly kept up. Everywhere there are signs of decaying magnificence." Channon added that "The galleries are reminiscent of the Vatican with their hundreds of busts and statues of emperors and gods. The great library is an enormous narrow red room the length of the house and is hung with enough paintings to found a museum."

In 1952, Castle Howard was opened to the public by its then-owner, Lord Howard of Henderskelfe, a younger son of Geoffrey Howard. It is now owned by a Howard family company, Castle Howard Estate Limited, and managed by the Hon. Nicholas Howard (the second son of Lord Howard of Henderskelfe) and his wife, Victoria.

The house is Grade I listed and there are many other listed structures on the estate, several of which are on the Heritage at Risk Register.

== House ==
Vaults and dome of the Great Hall by Vanbrugh, paintings by Giovanni Antonio Pellegrini The dome was recreated in 1961 after its destruction by fire in 1940, and repainted by Scott Medd

The 3rd Earl of Carlisle first spoke to William Talman, a leading architect, but commissioned Vanbrugh, a fellow member of the Kit-Cat Club, to design the building. Castle Howard was that gentleman-dilettante's first foray into architecture, but he was assisted by Nicholas Hawksmoor. Vanbrugh's design evolved into a Baroque structure with two symmetrical wings projecting to either side of a north–south axis. The crowning central dome was added to the design at a late stage, after building had begun. Construction began at the east end, with the East Wing constructed from 1701 to 1703, the east end of the Garden Front from 1701 to 1706, the Central Block (including dome) from 1703 to 1706, and the west end of the Garden Front from 1707 to 1709. All are exuberantly decorated in Baroque style, with coronets, cherubs, urns and cyphers, with Roman Doric pilasters on the north front and Corinthian on the south. Many interiors were decorated by Giovanni Antonio Pellegrini.

Grand Staircase of the West wing

The Earl then turned his energies to the surrounding garden and grounds. Although the complete design is shown in the third volume of Colen Campbell's Vitruvius Britannicus, published in 1725, the West Wing was not yet started when Vanbrugh died in 1726, despite his remonstration with the Earl. The house remained incomplete on the death of the 3rd Earl in 1738, but the remaining construction finally started at the direction of the 4th Earl. Vanbrugh's design was not completed: the West Wing was built in a contrasting Palladian style to a design by the 3rd Earl's son-in-law, Sir Thomas Robinson. The new wing remained incomplete, with no first floor or roof, at the death of the 4th Earl in 1758. Although a roof had been added, the interior remained undecorated by the death of Robinson in 1777. Rooms were completed stage by stage over the following decades, but the whole was not completed until 1811 under Charles Heathcote Tatham.

A large part of the house was destroyed by a fire on 9 November 1940. The dome, the central hall, the dining room and the staterooms on the east side were entirely destroyed. Antonio Pellegrini's ceiling decoration, the Fall of Phaeton, was lost when the dome collapsed. In total, twenty pictures (including two Tintorettos) and several valuable mirrors were lost. The fire took the Malton and York Fire Brigades eight hours to bring under control. Some of the devastated rooms have been restored over the following decades. In 1960–61 the dome was rebuilt, and in the following couple of years Pellegrini's Fall of Phaeton was recreated on the underside of the dome by Canadian artist Scott Medd. The East Wing remains a shell, although it has been re-roofed. In 2009 an underwater ground-source heat recovery system was installed under the castle's lake that halved the heating bill. According to figures released by the Association of Leading Visitor Attractions, 287,193 people visited Castle Howard in 2025.

View of the Great Hall from one of the two side staircases

The Turquoise Drawing Room

The Music Room

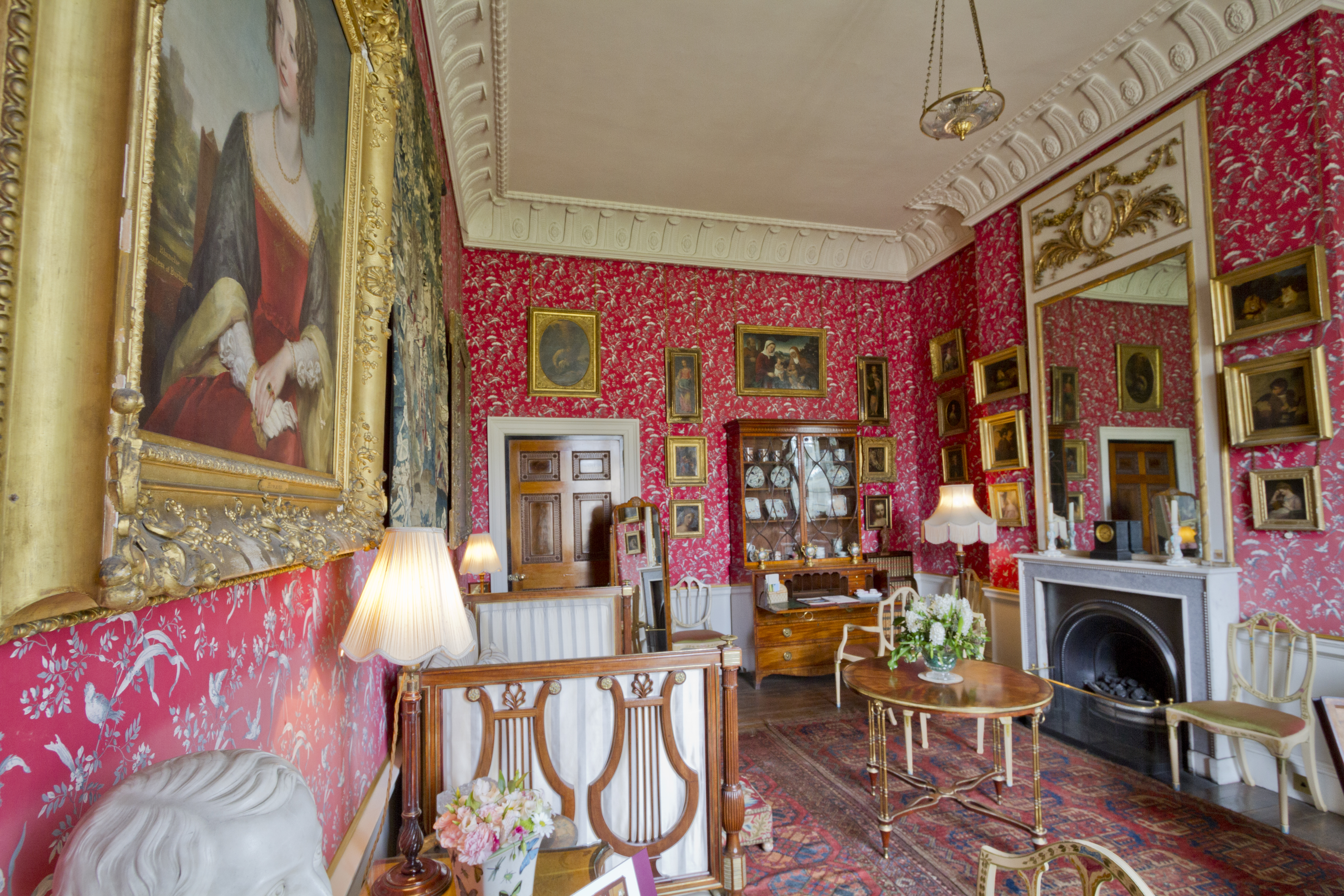
Lady Georgiana's Dressing Room

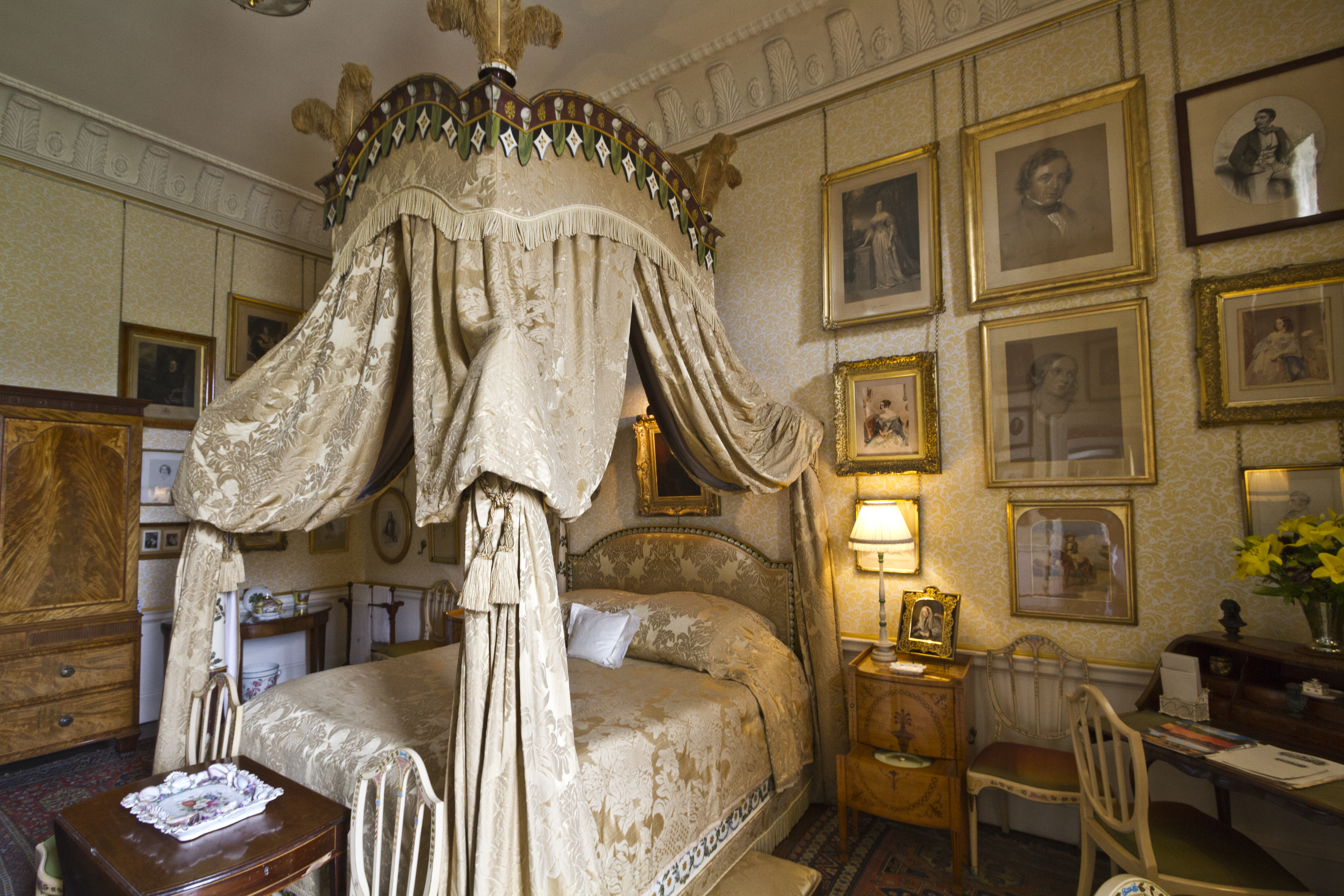
Lady Georgiana's Bedroom

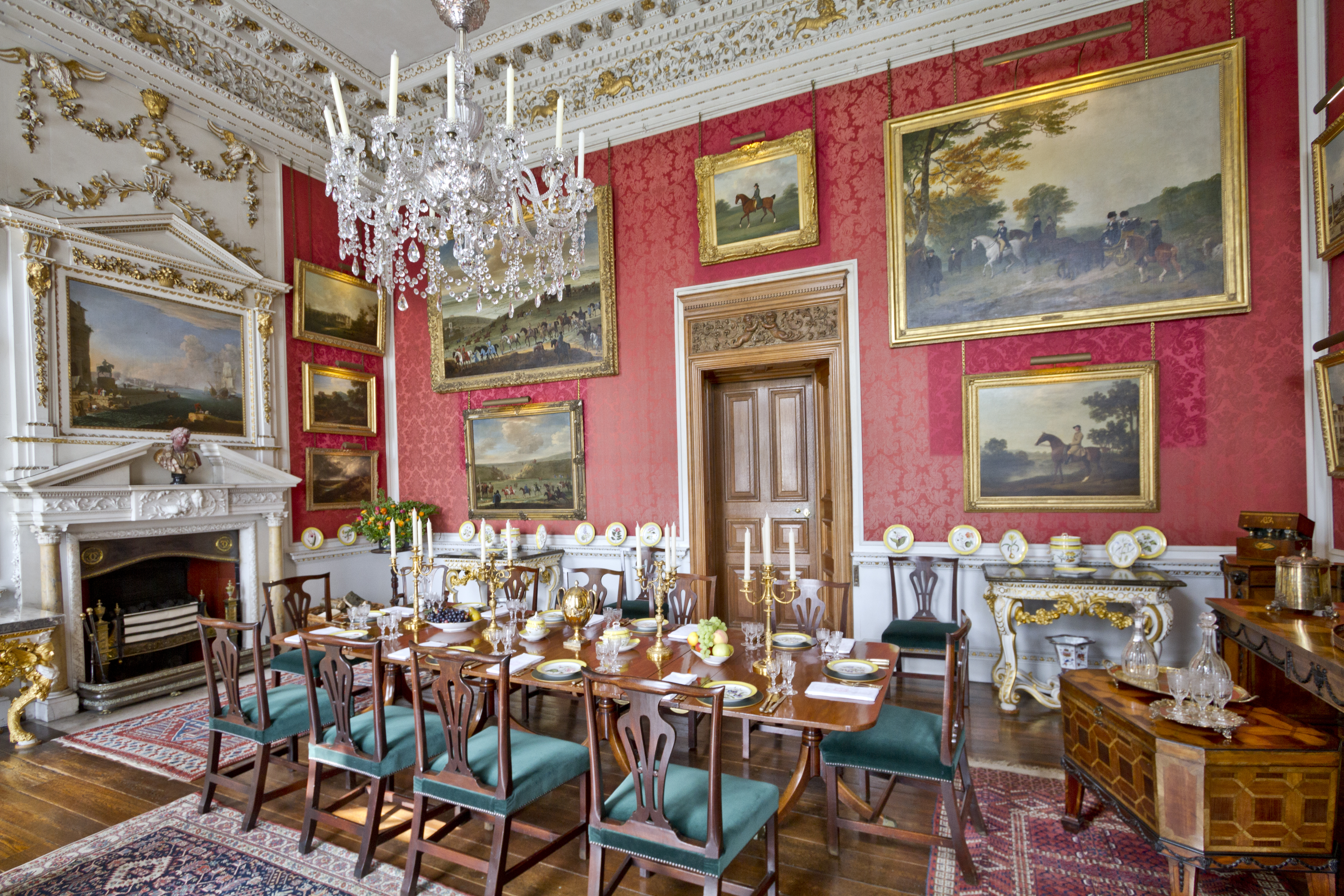
The Crimson Dining Room

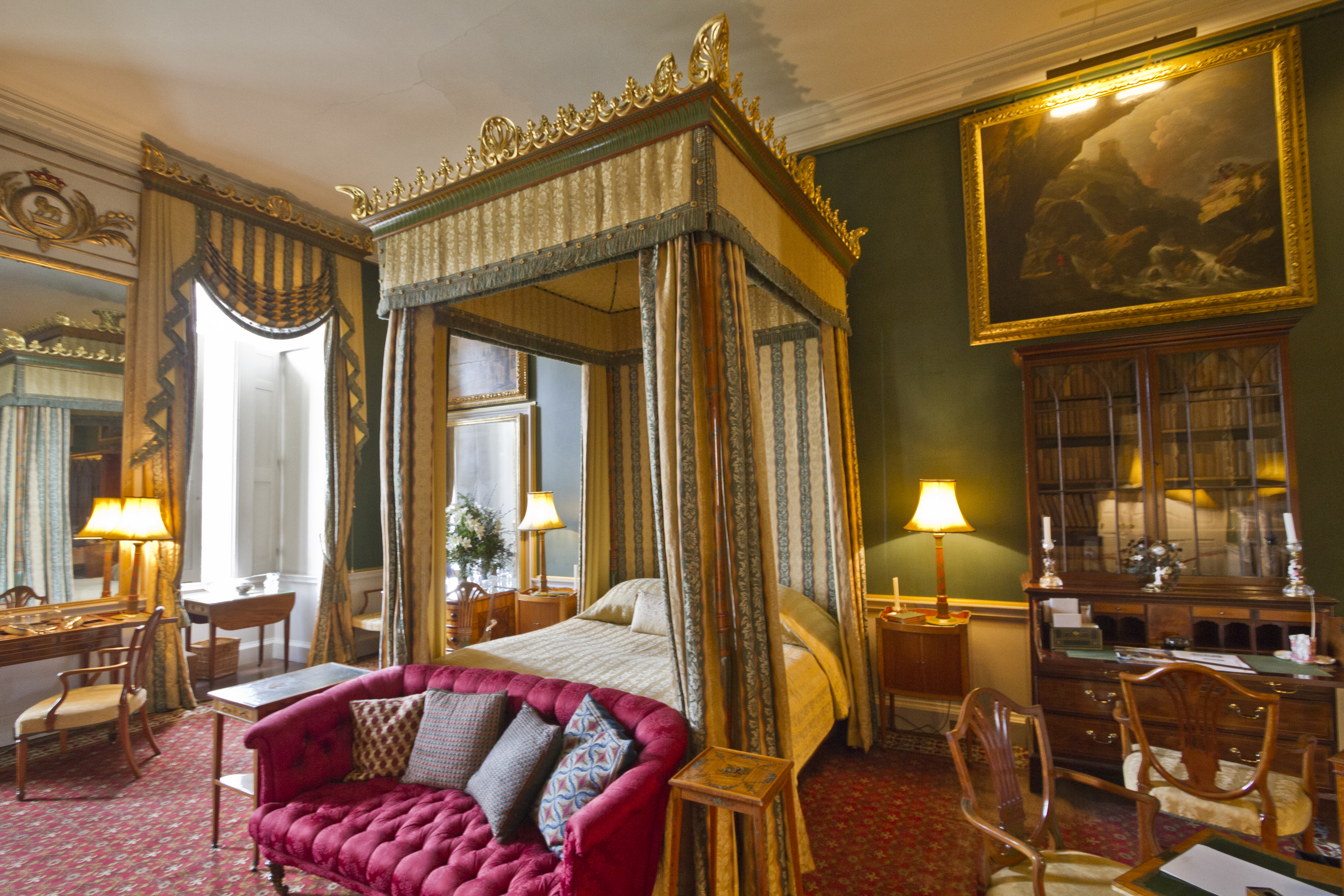
Castle Howard Bedroom

Antique Passage

View of the Long Gallery through a door

South part of the Long Gallery

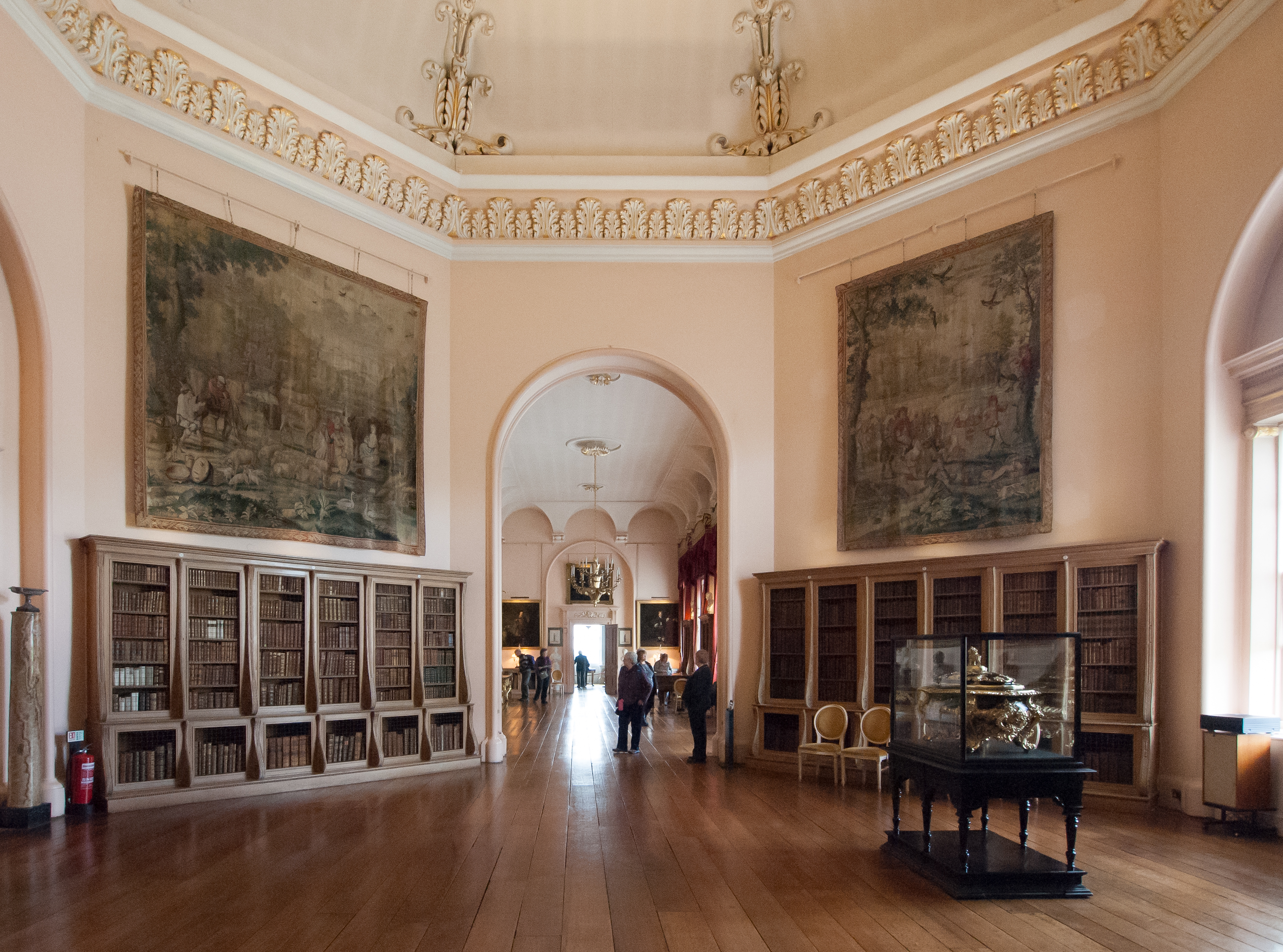
The Octagon, in the Long Gallery, 1802 by Charles Heathcote Tatham

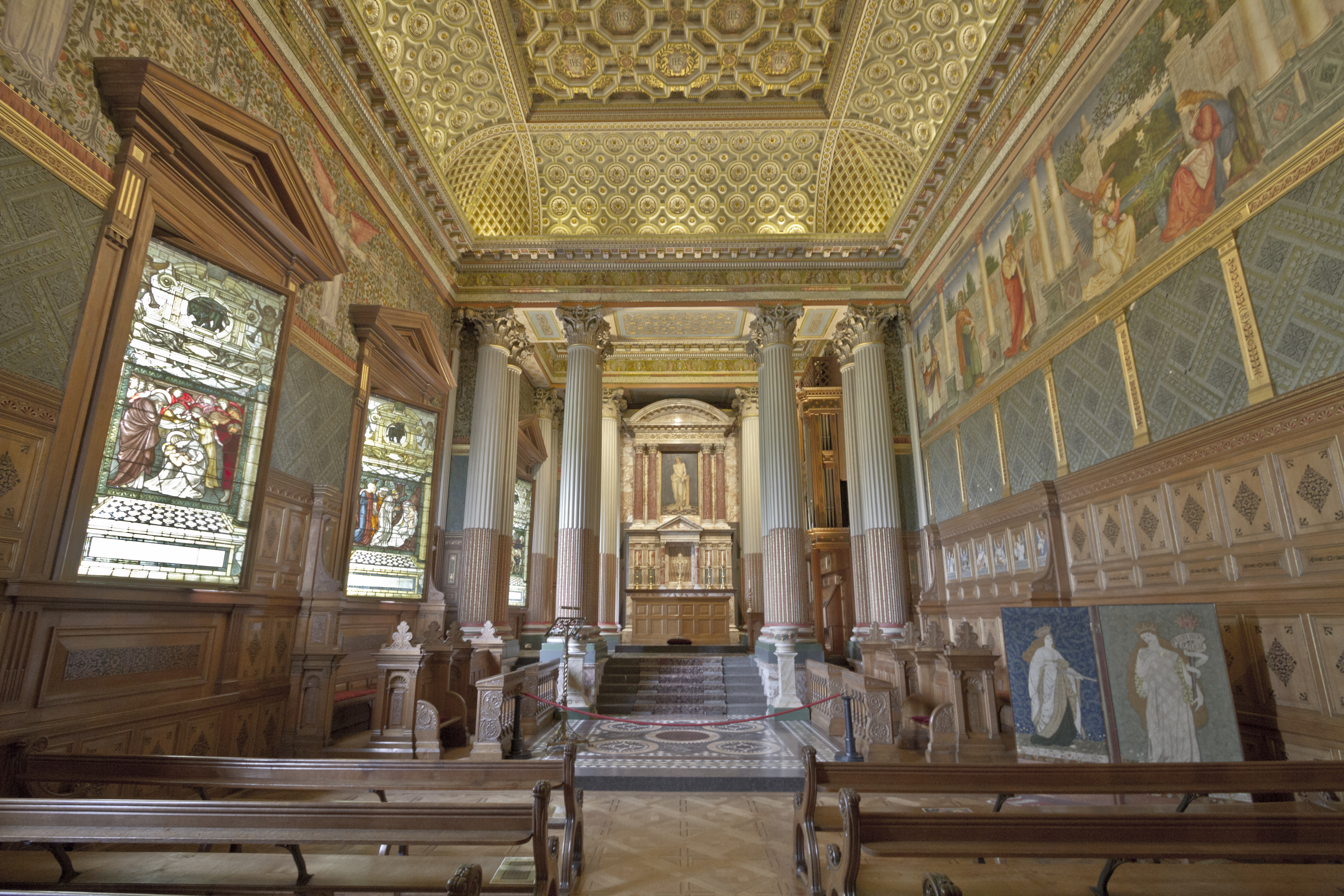
Castle Howard Chapel, altered and redecorated in 1875–78 by William Morris and Edward Burne-Jones

The Annunciation, stained-glass window in the chapel by Edward Burne-Jones

== Gardens ==
Atlas Fountain by John Thomas

Temple of the Four Winds

Castle Howard has extensive and diverse gardens. There is a large formal garden immediately behind (i.e., on the south side of) the house. The house is prominently situated on a ridge and this was exploited in the development of an English landscape park, which adjoins and opens out from the formal garden. The gardens are Grade I listed on the National Register of Historic Parks and Gardens.

Two major garden buildings are set in this landscape: the Temple of the Four Winds at the end of the garden, and The Mausoleum in the park. There is a lake on either side of the house. There is a woodland garden, Ray Wood, immediately east of the house, and the Walled Garden which contains decorative rose and flower gardens. The Ray Wood walls date from the 18th century and were restored in 2007.

Further buildings outside the preserved gardens include The Pyramid, restored in 2015, The Obelisk, and several follies and eyecatchers in the form of fortifications which have been restored in recent years; these include Carrmire Gate and Pyramid Gate. In nearby Pretty Wood, there are two more monuments, The Four Faces and a smaller pyramid by Hawksmoor.

Located on the estate, Skelf Island is a young people's play area with rope bridges connecting a series of tree-top structures. Also on the estate, but operating separately from the house and gardens and run by an entirely independent charitable trust, is the 127 acres (51 ha) Yorkshire Arboretum.

== In media ==
Castle Howard's most famous appearance in film was as Brideshead Castle in both the 1981 TV series and the 2008 film adaptations of Evelyn Waugh's novel Brideshead Revisited. It has been used as a location in many other TV and film productions including: the 1965 film Lady L; the 1966 film The Spy with a Cold Nose; Stanley Kubrick's 1975 film Barry Lyndon; the 1995 mini-series The Buccaneers; the 2006 film Garfield: A Tail of Two Kitties; the 2013 TV series Death Comes to Pemberley; the 2015 Bollywood film Shaandar; in the 2016 ITV series Victoria; and the 2020 Netflix series Bridgerton (2020).

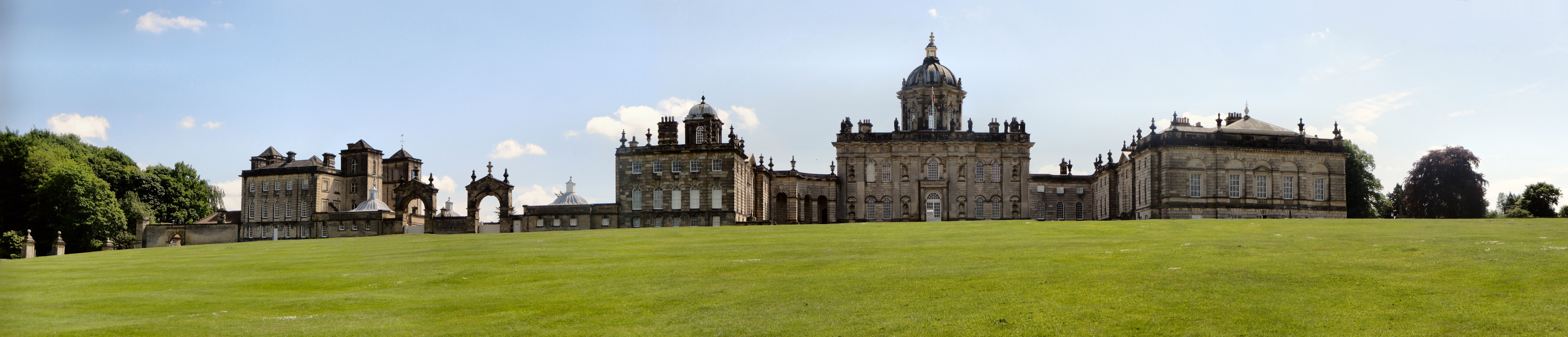
A panorama of Castle Howard's northern facade

The video clip for the song Four Out of Five by English rock band Arctic Monkeys was filmed at Castle Howard in 2018.

== See also ==
- Grade I listed buildings in North Yorkshire
- Listed buildings in Henderskelfe
- Hampton National Historic Site, an 18th-century US mansion said to have been inspired by Castle Howard.
- Castle Howard railway station
- John Vanbrugh
- List of Baroque residences
- 18th-century Western domes
- Nero's Urn
