= Grade I listed buildings in North Yorkshire (district) =

Buildings of national importance in North Yorkshire, England

There are over 9,000 Grade I listed buildings in England. This page is a list of these buildings in the unitary authority area of North Yorkshire.

== List of buildings ==
Name	Location	Type	Completed (Note: The date given is the date used by Historic England as significant for the initial building or that of an important part in the structure's description.)	Date designated	Grid ref. (Note: The grid reference is based on the British national grid reference system, sometimes known as OSGB36, used by the Ordnance Survey.) Geo-coordinates	Entry number (Note: The "List Entry Number" is a unique number assigned to each listed building and scheduled monument by Historic England.)	Image	Ref.
Church of Saint Helen	Ainderby Steeple	Church	14th century	31 March 1970	SE3346392097; 54°19′24″N 1°29′13″W	1315088	Church of Saint Helen More images	
Church of St Andrew	Aldborough	Church	16th century	15 March 1966	SE4059966430; 54°05′32″N 1°22′51″W	1173835	Church of St Andrew More images	
Allerton Castle	Allerton Park, Allerton Mauleverer with Hopperton	House	1721	15 March 1966	SE4141658089; 54°01′02″N 1°22′10″W	1189430	Allerton Castle More images	
Church of St Mary	Church Wynd, Alne	Church	12th century	17 May 1960	SE4951365334; 54°04′54″N 1°14′41″W	1151297	Church of St Mary More images	
Ampleforth Abbey Church	Ampleforth	Church	1961	2 March 2016	SE5980778841; 54°12′07″N 1°05′05″W	1315767	Ampleforth Abbey Church More images	
Christ Church	Appleton-le-Moors	Church	1863-5	5 June 1985	SE7348088094; 54°17′00″N 0°52′22″W	1173545	Christ Church More images	
Church of All Saints	Appleton-le-Street with Easthorpe	Church	11th century	25 January 1954	SE7343673580; 54°09′10″N 0°52′37″W	1296551	Church of All Saints More images	
Aske Hall	Aske	Country House	Early-mid 18th century	19 December 1951	NZ1775703385; 54°25′32″N 1°43′40″W	1157422	Aske Hall More images	
The Temple	Aske Park, Aske	Folly	c. 1745	4 February 1969	NZ1744903572; 54°25′38″N 1°43′57″W	1157439	The Temple More images	
Church of Saint Oswald	Askrigg	Church	15th century	25 March 1969	SD9475991015; 54°18′53″N 2°04′55″W	1301613	Church of Saint Oswald More images	
Nappa Hall	Nappa, Askrigg	Fortified Manor House	1459	16 January 1952	SD9657990795; 54°18′46″N 2°03′15″W	1157398	Nappa Hall More images	
Church of St James	Baldersby St James, Baldersby	Church	1856-58	26 May 1971	SE3662376957; 54°11′14″N 1°26′25″W	1296495	Church of St James More images	
Lych Gate to Church of St James	Baldersby St James, Baldersby	Lych Gate	1856-8	26 May 1971	SE3660676919; 54°11′12″N 1°26′26″W	1315555	Lych Gate to Church of St James	
Barden Church	Barden	Chapel	16th century	10 September 1954	SE0511857171; 54°00′38″N 1°55′24″W	1131761	Upload Photo	
Barden Tower	Barden	Tower house	Mid-16th century	10 September 1954	SE0509357198; 54°00′39″N 1°55′26″W	1317012	Barden Tower More images	
Priest's House	Barden	House	16th century	10 September 1954	SE0511057163; 54°00′38″N 1°55′25″W	1317013	Priest's House More images	
Church of St Michael	Barton-le-Street	Church	1160s	25 January 1954	SE7212174234	1148993	Church of St Michael More images	
Beamsley Hospital (north range)	Beamsley	Chapel	17th century	10 September 1954	SE0822953089; 53°58′26″N 1°52′34″W	1131765	Beamsley Hospital (north range) More images	
Bedale Hall	Bedale	Country House	c. 1735	5 May 1952	SE2652288373; 54°17′25″N 1°35′39″W	1314999	Bedale Hall More images	
Church of Saint Gregory	Bedale	Church	13th to 15th centuries	22 August 1966	SE2655688450; 54°17′28″N 1°35′37″W	1151205	Church of Saint Gregory More images	
Market Cross, Bedale	Bedale	Market Cross	14th century	22 August 1966	SE2659288280; 54°17′22″N 1°35′35″W	1314972	Market Cross, Bedale More images	
Beningbrough Hall	Beningbrough Park, Beningbrough	Country House	1716	28 February 1952	SE5162258563; 54°01′14″N 1°12′49″W	1150998	Beningbrough Hall More images	
Church of St Helen	Bilton-in-Ainsty	Church	12th century	30 March 1966	SE4760450382; 53°56′50″N 1°16′34″W	1315388	Church of St Helen More images	
Syningthwaite Priory Farmhouse	Bilton in Ainsty	Farmhouse	12th century	2 September 1952	SE4615448686; 53°55′56″N 1°17′55″W	1150361	Upload Photo	
Spout House	Bilsdale Midcable	House/Public House	16th century	23 June 1966	SE5741193549; 54°20′03″N 1°07′07″W	1150636	Spout House More images	
Church of Saint Nicholas	North Grimston, Birdsall	Church	Early 13th century	10 October 1966	SE8414067779; 54°05′57″N 0°42′53″W	1174500	Church of Saint Nicholas More images	
Church of St Mary	Birkin	Church	12th century	11 December 1967	SE5303426511; 53°43′56″N 1°11′51″W	1316671	Church of St Mary More images	
Church of St Mary, Bolton Abbey	Bolton Abbey	Church	Late 12th century	10 September 1954	SE0739854203; 53°59′02″N 1°53′19″W	1166745	Church of St Mary, Bolton Abbey More images	
Priory of St Mary	Bolton Abbey	Augustinian monastery	12th century	10 September 1954	SE0741754182; 53°59′01″N 1°53′18″W	1131775	Priory of St Mary More images	
Church of All Saints	Bolton Percy	Church	Early 14th century	3 February 1967	SE5317541275; 53°51′54″N 1°11′34″W	1296630	Church of All Saints More images	
Church of St Wilfrid	Brayton	Church	12th century	17 November 1966	SE6041930997; 53°46′19″N 1°05′05″W	1132537	Church of St Wilfrid More images	
Church of St Thomas	High Green, Brompton	Church	12th century	31 March 1970	SE3737596359; 54°21′41″N 1°25′35″W	1150903	Church of St Thomas More images	
Church of All Saints	Brompton	Church	14th century	18 January 1967	SE9429182127; 54°13′34″N 0°33′19″W	1316111	Church of All Saints More images	
Ferry Bridge	Brotherton	Bridge	1797	11 December 1967	SE4835224640; 53°42′57″N 1°16′08″W	1167483	Ferry Bridge More images	
Brough Hall	Brough Park, Brough with St. Giles	Country House	15th century	19 December 1951	SE2157497826; 54°22′32″N 1°40′10″W	1318301	Brough Hall More images	
Broughton Hall	Broughton	Country house	1597	10 September 1954	SD9428250844; 53°57′13″N 2°05′19″W	1132296	Broughton Hall More images	
Church of All Saints	Broughton	Church	Early 16th century	10 September 1954	SD9340650359; 53°56′57″N 2°06′07″W	1132291	Church of All Saints More images	
Carrmire Gates, Wall and End Turrets	Bulmer	Gates and Wall	Early 18th century	25 January 1954	SE7122868497; 54°06′27″N 0°54′43″W	1174223	Carrmire Gates, Wall and End Turrets More images	
Church of St Martin	Bulmer	Cross	Saxon	25 January 1954	SE6993867630; 54°05′59″N 0°55′55″W	1174317	Church of St Martin More images	
Monument to the 7th Earl of Carlisle	Bulmer	Column	1869	25 January 1954	SE7146867078; 54°05′41″N 0°54′31″W	1149624	Monument to the 7th Earl of Carlisle More images	
Church of St Lambert	Burneston	Church	15th century	22 August 1966	SE3086584942; 54°15′33″N 1°31′40″W	1315164	Church of St Lambert More images	
Church of St Wilfrid	Burnsall	Church	14th century	10 September 1954	SE0325761515; 54°02′59″N 1°57′06″W	1131740	Church of St Wilfrid More images	
Cowling Hall and wing	Cowling Lan, Burrill with Cowling	House	12th century	22 August 1966	SE2374787706; 54°17′04″N 1°38′12″W	1294034	Cowling Hall and wing More images	
Church of St Botolph	Bossall, Buttercrambe with Bossall	Church	Late 12th century	29 January 1953	SE7183660747; 54°02′16″N 0°54′17″W	1315746	Church of St Botolph More images	
Byland Abbey	Byland, Byland with Wass	Abbey	Late 12th century	4 January 1955	SE5495178959; 54°12′12″N 1°09′33″W	1315790	Byland Abbey More images	
Camblesforth Hall	Camblesforth	House	c. 1700	17 November 1966	SE6467826140; 53°43′40″N 1°01′16″W	1173983	Camblesforth Hall More images	
Carlton Towers	Carlton	Country House	Early 17th century	17 November 1966	SE6497623798; 53°42′24″N 1°01′02″W	1295955	Carlton Towers More images	
Bolton Castle	Castle Bolton, Castle Bolton with East and West Bolton	Castle	Late 14th century	13 February 1967	SE0335891833; 54°19′19″N 1°57′00″W	1130885	Bolton Castle More images	
Church of St Anne	Catterick	Church	1412	4 February 1969	SE2401297977; 54°22′36″N 1°37′55″W	1131488	Church of St Anne More images	
Cawood Castle gatehouse	Cawood	Castle	1426-1451	17 November 1966	SE5739437698; 53°49′57″N 1°07′46″W	1132508	Cawood Castle gatehouse More images	
Banqueting Hall Adjoining East Side of Cawood Castle gatehouse	Cawood	Castle	1426-1451	17 November 1966	SE5740837687; 53°49′56″N 1°07′45″W	1174558	Banqueting Hall Adjoining East Side of Cawood Castle gatehouse More images	
Church of All Saints	Cawood	Church	C20	17 November 1966	SE5777937790; 53°49′59″N 1°07′25″W	1316657	Church of All Saints More images	
Church of Saint John the Baptist	Cayton	Church	12th century	18 January 1967	TA0566083330; 54°14′05″N 0°22′50″W	1148133	Church of Saint John the Baptist More images	
Church of St Mary the Virgin	Church Fenton	Church	13th century	3 February 1967	SE5143136764; 53°49′29″N 1°13′13″W	1148436	Church of St Mary the Virgin More images	
Courthouse to East of Colburn Hall	Colburn	Courthouse	c. 1300	4 February 1969	SE1963099232; 54°23′18″N 1°41′57″W	1301649	Courthouse to East of Colburn Hall	
Constable Burton Hall	Burton Park, Constable Burton	House	Early 17th century	13 February 1967	SE1636091193; 54°18′58″N 1°45′00″W	1131472	Constable Burton Hall More images	
Coverham Abbey	Coverham with Agglethorpe	Premonstratensian Monastery	13th century	13 December 1967	SE1060186404; 54°16′23″N 1°50′19″W	1178910	Coverham Abbey More images	
Church of St Michael	Coxwold	Church	c. 1430	17 May 1960	SE5330477201; 54°11′16″N 1°11′05″W	1150758	Church of St Michael More images	
Shandy Hall	Coxwold	House	1450s	28 February 1952	SE5312077291; 54°11′19″N 1°11′15″W	1315184	Shandy Hall More images	
Church of St Michael	Crambe	Church	Late 11th century	25 January 1954	SE7333164859; 54°04′28″N 0°52′51″W	1295776	Church of St Michael More images	
Crayke Castle	Crayke	House	15th century	28 February 1952	SE5590970680; 54°07′44″N 1°08′45″W	1189213	Crayke Castle More images	
Church of St Peter	Croft-on-Tees	Church	12th century	18 March 1968	NZ2888109846; 54°28′59″N 1°33′21″W	1301945	Church of St Peter More images	
Croft Bridge	Hurworth Place, Croft-on-Tees	Road Bridge	14th century	20 March 1967	NZ2896309832; 54°28′59″N 1°33′16″W	1116440	Croft Bridge More images	
Croft Bridge	Croft-on-Tees	Road Bridge	14th century	19 December 1951	NZ2896309831; 54°28′59″N 1°33′16″W	1131364	Croft Bridge More images	
Church of St Peter	Dalby, Dalby-cum-Skewsby	Church	Early 12th century	17 May 1960	SE6372271212; 54°07′58″N 1°01′35″W	1150761	Church of St Peter More images	
Danby Castle	Danby	Farmhouse	19th century	20 December 1990	NZ7172507238; 54°27′20″N 0°53′43″W	1178588	Danby Castle More images	
Danby Wiske Church	Danby Wiske	Church	Late 15th century	31 March 1970	SE3381098337; 54°22′46″N 1°28′52″W	1150204	Danby Wiske Church More images	
Denton Hall and Attached Forecourt Walls and Railings	Denton	House	1778	6 February 1952	SE1476548694; 53°56′03″N 1°46′36″W	1315354	Denton Hall and Attached Forecourt Walls and Railings More images	
Church of St Peter and St Paul	Drax	Church	12th century	17 November 1986	SE6758726371; 53°43′46″N 0°58′37″W	1148397	Church of St Peter and St Paul More images	
Ruins of Abbey of St Agatha	Easby	Abbey	Late 12th century	4 February 1969	NZ1849100291; 54°23′52″N 1°43′00″W	1131606	Ruins of Abbey of St Agatha More images	
Easby Abbey gatehouse	Easby	Gatehouse	Early 14th century	4 February 1969	NZ1859700276; 54°23′51″N 1°42′54″W	1131564	Easby Abbey gatehouse More images	
Church of St Agatha	Easby	Church	12th, 13th, and 14th centuries	4 February 1969	NZ1855100275; 54°23′51″N 1°42′57″W	1131607	Church of St Agatha More images	
Jervaulx Abbey	Jervaulx Park, East Witton	Abbey	Early English	15 February 1967	SE1717685753; 54°16′02″N 1°44′16″W	1130961	Jervaulx Abbey More images	
Mount Grace Priory	East Harlsey	Priory	15th century	31 March 1970	SE4493298513; 54°22′49″N 1°18′35″W	1315123	Mount Grace Priory More images	
Jervaulx Abbey gatehouse	Jervaulx Park, East Witton	Abbey	13th century	15 February 1967	SE1697785665; 54°15′59″N 1°44′27″W	1318555	Jervaulx Abbey gatehouse More images	
Ebberston Hall	Ebberston and Yedingham	Country House	Early 19th century	10 November 1953	SE8924383423; 54°14′19″N 0°37′56″W	1149555	Ebberston Hall More images	
Church of St Oswald	Farnham	Church	12th century	15 March 1966	SE3481160584; 54°02′24″N 1°28′12″W	1150301	Church of St Oswald More images	
Farnhill Hall	Main Street, Farnhill	Fortified manor house	15th century	10 September 1954	SE0032946468; 53°54′52″N 1°59′47″W	1316997	Upload Photo	
Farnley Hall	Farnley	Country House	17th century	6 February 1952	SE2151947276; 53°55′16″N 1°40′26″W	1150040	Farnley Hall More images	
Church of St Oswald	Filey	Church	17th century	24 October 1950	TA1177881065; 54°12′47″N 0°17′15″W	1316455	Church of St Oswald More images	
Rudding Park House	Rudding Lane, Follifoot	House	1805-24	8 March 1952	SE3341853164; 53°58′24″N 1°29′31″W	1188343	Rudding Park House More images	
Forcett Hall	Forcett	Country House	Early 18th century	19 December 1951	NZ1721212376; 54°30′23″N 1°44′09″W	1316916	Forcett Hall More images	
Church of St Stephen	Fylingdales	Church	Medieval	6 October 1969	NZ9416205940; 54°26′25″N 0°32′59″W	1148706	Church of St Stephen More images	
Church of St Alkeda	Giggleswick	Church	Late 14th/early 15th century	20 February 1958	SD8115164084; 54°04′20″N 2°17′22″W	1157303	Church of St Alkeda More images	
Church of the Holy Cross	Gilling East	Church	c. 1200	4 January 1955	SE6160076902; 54°11′03″N 1°03′27″W	1296322	Church of the Holy Cross More images	
Gilling Castle	Gilling East	Country House	18th century	4 January 1955	SE6113376794; 54°11′00″N 1°03′53″W	1149581	Gilling Castle More images	
Church of St Agatha	Gilling West, Gilling with Hartforth and Sedbury	Church	Late 11th century	4 February 1969	NZ1820205154; 54°26′29″N 1°43′15″W	1316927	Church of St Agatha More images	
Church of All Saints	Low Green, Great Ayton	Church	12th century	23 June 1966	NZ5561610824; 54°29′23″N 1°08′35″W	1150650	Church of All Saints More images	
Church of St Andrew	Grinton	Church	16th century	7 December 1966	SE0461498426; 54°22′53″N 1°55′50″W	1301991	Church of St Andrew More images	
Church of St Peter	Hackness	Church	11th century	18 January 1967	SE9691090554; 54°18′05″N 0°30′44″W	1296564	Church of St Peter More images	
Hackness Hall and Railings Attached to Terrace on Garden Front	Hackness	Country House	1791-1796	13 December 1951	SE9711790521; 54°18′04″N 0°30′33″W	1148859	Hackness Hall and Railings Attached to Terrace on Garden Front More images	
Church of St Wilfrid	Duchy Road, Harrogate	Church	1909-14	4 February 1975	SE2941255554; 53°59′43″N 1°33′10″W	1189773	Church of St Wilfrid More images	
Brimham Lodge	Brimham Road, Hartwith cum Winsley	House	1661	3 March 1987	SE2271363298; 54°03′54″N 1°39′16″W	1150538	Brimham Lodge More images	
Helmsley Castle	Helmsley	Castle	12th century	4 January 1955	SE6106183637; 54°14′41″N 1°03′52″W	1175226	Helmsley Castle More images	
Duncombe Park	Helmsley	House	Early 18th century	4 January 1955	SE6041882992; 54°14′21″N 1°04′28″W	1295358	Duncombe Park More images	
Duncombe Park Gates and Railings	Duncombe Park, Helmsley	Gates	1845	18 March 1985	SE603830; 54°14′21″N 1°04′31″W	1149246	Duncombe Park Gates and Railings More images	
Northern Stable Block, Duncombe Park	Duncombe Park, Helmsley	Stable	1846	4 January 1955	SE6039783046; 54°14′22″N 1°04′29″W	1149310	Northern Stable Block, Duncombe Park More images	
Duncombe Park Southern Stable Block	Duncombe Park, Helmsley	Stable	1846	18 March 1985	SE603829; 54°14′19″N 1°04′30″W	1149288	Duncombe Park Southern Stable Block More images	
Ionic Temple, Duncombe Park	Duncombe Park, Helmsley	Temple	c. 1730	4 January 1955	SE6059683137; 54°14′25″N 1°04′18″W	1149311	Ionic Temple, Duncombe Park More images	
Tuscan Temple, Duncombe Park	Duncombe Park, Helmsley	Temple	c. 1730	4 January 1955	SE6070682624; 54°14′09″N 1°04′12″W	1295364	Tuscan Temple, Duncombe Park More images	
Church of St Mary the Virgin	Hemingbrough	Church	Late 12th century	17 November 1966	SE6735130619; 53°46′03″N 0°58′47″W	1148462	Church of St Mary the Virgin More images	
Castle Howard and east court	Castle Howard, Henderskelfe	House	1700-1714	25 January 1954	SE7163570088; 54°07′18″N 0°54′20″W	1316030	Castle Howard and east court More images	
Atlas Fountain and Pond	Castle Howard, Henderskelfe	Fountain	1850	22 June 1987	SE7164469922; 54°07′13″N 0°54′19″W	1148973	Atlas Fountain and Pond More images	
Pyramid in Pretty Wood	Castle Howard, Henderskelfe	Garden Ornament		25 January 1954	SE7314269037; 54°06′43″N 0°52′58″W	1149012	Upload Photo	
The Four Faces statue	Castle Howard, Henderskelfe	Sculpture		25 January 1954	SE7308368733; 54°06′33″N 0°53′01″W	1316051	The Four Faces statue More images	
New River Bridge	Castle Howard, Henderskelfe	Bridge	c. 1740	25 January 1954	SE7238069762; 54°07′07″N 0°53′39″W	1149011	New River Bridge More images	
Pedestal and Statue of Wrestlers	Castle Howard, Henderskelfe	Garden Ornament	c. 1720	25 January 1954	SE7164069784; 54°07′08″N 0°54′20″W	1172902	Pedestal and Statue of Wrestlers More images	
Pedestal and Statue of Spinario	Castle Howard, Henderskelfe	Statue	c. 1720	25 January 1954	SE7172269808; 54°07′09″N 0°54′15″W	1296457	Pedestal and Statue of Spinario	
Pyramid Gatehouse and flanking wings	Castle Howard, Henderskelfe	Gatehouse	Early 18th-century	25 January 1954	SE7106669465; 54°06′58″N 0°54′52″W	1148979	Pyramid Gatehouse and flanking wings More images	
The Mausoleum and Bastion Wall with Gates and Railings	Castle Howard, Henderskelfe	Gate	1729-42	25 January 1954	SE7273969630; 54°07′03″N 0°53′19″W	1149010	The Mausoleum and Bastion Wall with Gates and Railings More images	
The Obelisk	Castle Howard, Henderskelfe	Obelisk	1714	25 January 1954	SE7098369950; 54°07′14″N 0°54′56″W	1148980	The Obelisk More images	
The Pyramid and Surrounding Piers	Castle Howard, Henderskelfe	Commemorative Monument	1728	25 January 1954	SE7192069191; 54°06′49″N 0°54′05″W	1148971	The Pyramid and Surrounding Piers More images	
The Stables	Castle Howard, Henderskelfe	Stables/Cafe	1781-4	22 June 1987	SE7121969949; 54°07′14″N 0°54′43″W	1172772	The Stables More images	
The Temple of the Four Winds Including Retaining Wall	Castle Howard, Henderskelfe	Wall	1724-26	25 January 1954	SE7223669988; 54°07′14″N 0°53′47″W	1296445	The Temple of the Four Winds Including Retaining Wall More images	
Victoria Gate and Railings and Pier to North	Castle Howard, Henderskelfe	Gate	Early 18th century	22 June 1987	SE7125769928; 54°07′13″N 0°54′41″W	1172781	Victoria Gate and Railings and Pier to North	
Walls to Walled Garden with Gates including the Satyr Gate and Corner Piers	Castle Howard, Henderskelfe	Gate	Early 18th century	22 June 1987	SE7128269841; 54°07′10″N 0°54′39″W	1296425	Walls to Walled Garden with Gates including the Satyr Gate and Corner Piers More images	
Walling to Park South of Gatehouse	Castle Howard, Henderskelfe	Wall	c. 1723	25 January 1954	SE7061869475; 54°06′59″N 0°55′16″W	1316058	Walling to Park South of Gatehouse	
Church of St Andrew	East Heslerton Village, Heslerton	Church	1877	10 October 1966	SE9261176653; 54°10′38″N 0°34′57″W	1315728	Church of St Andrew More images	
Hipswell Hall	Hipswell	Farmhouse	c. 1917	4 February 1969	SE1881198426; 54°22′52″N 1°42′43″W	1179639	Hipswell Hall More images	
Church of St Mary the Virgin	Hornby	Church	c. 1080	13 February 1967	SE2224393758; 54°20′20″N 1°39′34″W	1318321	Church of St Mary the Virgin More images	
Hornby Castle	Hornby Park, Hornby	Manor House	Late 14th century	13 February 1967	SE2257593704; 54°20′18″N 1°39′15″W	1131444	Hornby Castle More images	
Church of St Oswald	Horton in Ribblesdale	Parish church	12th century	20 February 1958	SD8101072116; 54°08′40″N 2°17′32″W	1132264	Church of St Oswald More images	
Hovingham Hall	Hovingham	Country House	c1750-1774	25 January 1954	SE6662775673; 54°10′21″N 0°58′51″W	1315690	Hovingham Hall More images	
Church of Saint John	Howsham	Church	1859-1860	10 October 1966	SE7374162892; 54°03′24″N 0°52′30″W	1315991	Church of Saint John More images	
Howsham Hall	Howsham	House	Elizabethan	20 September 1951	SE7341863134; 54°03′32″N 0°52′48″W	1315992	Howsham Hall More images	
Church of St Matthew	Hutton Buscel	Church	12th century	18 January 1967	SE9727384032; 54°14′34″N 0°30′32″W	1172851	Church of St Matthew More images	
Arncliffe Hall and wall attached to south east	Ingleby Cross, Ingleby Arncliffe	Country House	1753-4	5 May 1952	NZ4529100204; 54°23′43″N 1°18′14″W	1151375	Arncliffe Hall and wall attached to south east More images	
Church of St Andrew	Ingleby Greenhow	Church	12th century	23 June 1966	NZ5809206280; 54°26′55″N 1°06′20″W	1151383	Church of St Andrew More images	
Church of St Edmund	Kellington	Church	Norman	11 December 1967	SE5479224561; 53°42′53″N 1°10′17″W	1148402	Church of St Edmund More images	
Church of St Andrew	Kildwick	Church	14th century	10 September 1954	SE0114445893; 53°54′33″N 1°59′03″W	1132175	Church of St Andrew More images	
Kildwick Bridge	Kildwick	Bridge	1305–13	10 September 1954	SE0111545699; 53°54′27″N 1°59′04″W	1167718	Kildwick Bridge More images	
Kiplin Hall	Kiplin Park, Kiplin	Country House	1625	29 January 1953	SE2744697487; 54°22′20″N 1°34′45″W	1315476	Kiplin Hall More images	
Church of St Peter and St Felix	Kirby	Church	12th century	4 February 1969	NZ1402906598; 54°27′16″N 1°47′06″W	1301472	Church of St Peter and St Felix More images	
Church of All Saints	Kirby Hill	Church	10th century	20 June 1966	SE3932268598; 54°06′42″N 1°24′00″W	1190293	Church of All Saints More images	
Church of St Lawrence	Kirby Sigston	Church	12th century	31 March 1970	SE4166194668; 54°20′45″N 1°21′38″W	1150888	Church of St Lawrence More images	
Dromonby Hall and Dromonby Hall Cottage with attached outbuilding	Busby Lane, Kirkby	House	18th century	27 February 1975	NZ5316505827; 54°26′42″N 1°10′54″W	1151365	Upload Photo	
Church of St Michael the Archangel	Kirkby Malham	Parish church	Late 15th century	20 February 1958	SD8940360997; 54°02′41″N 2°09′48″W	1132389	Church of St Michael the Archangel More images	
Church of St Andrew	Kirkby Malzeard	Church	12th century	6 March 1967	SE2354774527; 54°09′58″N 1°38′27″W	1173967	Church of St Andrew More images	
Church of All Saints	Kirkbymoorside	Church	13th century	14 July 1955	SE6974086613; 54°16′14″N 0°55′50″W	1315938	Church of All Saints More images	
Church of All Saints	Kirk Deighton	Church	Early-mid 15th century	30 March 1966	SE3988250524; 53°56′57″N 1°23′38″W	1294634	Church of All Saints More images	
Church of St John the Baptist	Kirk Hammerton	Church	11th century	15 March 1966	SE4652455525; 53°59′37″N 1°17′31″W	1149932	Church of St John the Baptist More images	
Church of St Michael	Kirklington	Church	Early 13th century	22 August 1966	SE3186781042; 54°13′27″N 1°30′46″W	1150766	Church of St Michael More images	
Chapel of Our Lady of the Crag	Knaresborough	Chapel	Early 15th century	5 February 1952	SE3513556447; 54°00′10″N 1°27′56″W	1149913	Chapel of Our Lady of the Crag More images	
Church of Saint John the Baptist	Knaresborough	Parish Church	Late 12th century	5 February 1952	SE3471257185; 54°00′34″N 1°28′19″W	1293930	Church of Saint John the Baptist More images	
Church of St Mary	Lastingham	Church	early C9	14 July 1955	SE7280890452; 54°18′16″N 0°52′57″W	1316041	Church of St Mary More images	
Lawkland Hall and garden walls	Lawkland	House	Late 16th century	20 February 1958	SD7765065922; 54°05′19″N 2°20′35″W	1132378	Lawkland Hall and garden walls More images	
Church of St Mary	Leake	Church	12th century	31 March 1970	SE4331990630; 54°18′34″N 1°20′09″W	1315093	Church of St Mary More images	
Church of St Oswald	Leathley	Church	12th century	22 November 1966	SE2318847010; 53°55′07″N 1°38′54″W	1174461	Church of St Oswald More images	
Banqueting House at Studley Royal	Studley Park, Lindrick With Studley Royal and Fountains	Banqueting House	1728–32	6 March 1967	SE2781268901; 54°06′55″N 1°34′34″W	1150608	Banqueting House at Studley Royal More images	
Canal Approximately 500 Metres Long, with the Drum Falls and Weir Inlet	Studley Park, Lindrick with Studley Royal and Fountains	Canal	c1718-1728	11 June 1986	SE2799068929; 54°06′56″N 1°34′24″W	1173904	Canal Approximately 500 Metres Long, with the Drum Falls and Weir Inlet	
Temple of Piety on East Side of Moon Pond	Studley Park, Lindrick with Studley Royal and Fountains	Garden Building	Completed 1742	6 March 1967	SE2808968786; 54°06′51″N 1°34′19″W	1150613	Temple of Piety on East Side of Moon Pond More images	
Church of St Mary	Studley Park, Lindrick with Studley Royal and Fountains	Church	1871-78	6 March 1967	SE2754169291; 54°07′08″N 1°34′49″W	1315267	Church of St Mary More images	
Fountains Abbey with ancillary buildings	Lindrick with Studley Royal and Fountains	Abbey	Romanesque	11 June 1986	SE2749468282; 54°06′35″N 1°34′51″W	1149811	Fountains Abbey with ancillary buildings More images	
Abbey Mill	Lindrick with Studley Royal and Fountains	Mill	Mid 12th century	11 June 1986	SE2725668193; 54°06′32″N 1°35′05″W	1173325	Abbey Mill More images	
Fountains Hall	Lindrick with Studley Royal and Fountains	Country House	1598-1611	23 April 1952	SE2713668289; 54°06′35″N 1°35′11″W	1149809	Fountains Hall More images	
Church of the Holy Trinity, Little Ouseburn	Little Ouseburn	Church	11th century	15 March 1966	SE4523761139; 54°02′39″N 1°18′38″W	1150296	Church of the Holy Trinity, Little Ouseburn More images	
Swinsty Hall	Little Timble	House	Late C16-Early 17th century	14 July 1987	SE1936453197; 53°58′28″N 1°42′23″W	1174496	Swinsty Hall More images	
Church of All Saints	Long Marston	Church	c. 1400	30 March 1966	SE5051750777; 53°57′02″N 1°13′54″W	1150327	Church of All Saints More images	
Church of St Mary the Virgin	Long Preston	Church	Late 14th/early 15th century	20 February 1958	SD8371558090; 54°01′07″N 2°15′00″W	1157818	Church of St Mary the Virgin More images	
Church of St Oswald	Lythe	Parish Church	13th century	6 October 1969	NZ8501513154; 54°30′24″N 0°41′19″W	1316097	Church of St Oswald More images	
Old Mulgrave Castle	Lythe	Bailey	12th century	6 October 1969	NZ8393911673; 54°29′36″N 0°42′20″W	1316096	Old Mulgrave Castle More images	
Priory Church of St Mary	Old Malton, Malton	Church	12th century	29 September 1951	SE7986172549; 54°08′33″N 0°46′44″W	1201925	Priory Church of St Mary More images	
Walls Bounding Churchyard of St Mary's Priory Church	Old Malton, Malton	Gate	Mid 18th century	29 September 1951	SE7983972528; 54°08′33″N 0°46′46″W	1220206	Walls Bounding Churchyard of St Mary's Priory Church	
Markenfield Hall	Markenfield Hall	Moated Manor House	Early 15th century	23 April 1952	SE2945567395; 54°06′06″N 1°33′04″W	1293954	Markenfield Hall More images	
Church of St Mary and St Alkelda	Middleham	Church	14th century	15 February 1967	SE1263287878; 54°17′11″N 1°48′27″W	1318544	Church of St Mary and St Alkelda More images	
Middleham Castle	Middleham	Castle	12th century	6 January 1970	SE1267387618; 54°17′03″N 1°48′25″W	1318543	Middleham Castle More images	
Church of St Andrew	Middleton	Church	1782	10 November 1953	SE7821585446; 54°15′31″N 0°48′03″W	1315705	Church of St Andrew More images	
Church of St Michael and grave cover leaning on buttress beside north door	Middleton Tyas	Church	14th century	4 February 1969	NZ2352005569; 54°26′42″N 1°38′20″W	1131579	Church of St Michael and grave cover leaning on buttress beside north door More images	
Church of St Wilfrid	Monk Fryston	Church	13th century	11 December 1967	SE5052429746; 53°45′42″N 1°14′06″W	1296769	Church of St Wilfrid More images	
Moulton Hall	Moulton	Country House	Early-Mid 17th century	19 December 1951	NZ2345903476; 54°25′34″N 1°38′24″W	1157560	Moulton Hall More images	
The Manor House	Moulton	House	17th century	19 December 1951	NZ2350003739; 54°25′43″N 1°38′21″W	1131585	The Manor House More images	
Gatepiers, Wall and Railings of Myton Hall to east	Myton-on-Swale	Gate		17 May 1960	SE4412266869; 54°05′45″N 1°19′37″W	1151270	Gatepiers, Wall and Railings of Myton Hall to east	
Myton Hall	Hall Lane, Myton-on-Swale	Country House	1693	28 February 1952	SE4406266891; 54°05′46″N 1°19′40″W	1189504	Myton Hall More images	
Church of Christ the Consoler, with Eleanor Cross to east	Skelton-on-Ure, Newby with Mulwith	Church	1871-76	6 March 1967	SE3599567951; 54°06′22″N 1°27′04″W	1315406	Church of Christ the Consoler, with Eleanor Cross to east More images	
Newby Hall	Newby with Mulwith	Country House	c1695-1697	23 April 1952	SE3478667436; 54°06′06″N 1°28′10″W	1150307	Newby Hall More images	
Skelton Lodges to Newby Hall with Attached Gates and Screen Walls	Newby with Mulwith	Gate	c. 1777	6 March 1967	SE3624167921; 54°06′21″N 1°26′50″W	1289365	Skelton Lodges to Newby Hall with Attached Gates and Screen Walls More images	
Stables Approximately 150 Metres North of Newby Hall	Newby with Mulwith	Tack Room	19th century	23 April 1952	SE3479267524; 54°06′09″N 1°28′10″W	1150308	Stables Approximately 150 Metres North of Newby Hall More images	
Newburgh Priory	Newburgh Park, Newburgh	Country House	16th century	28 February 1952	SE5427976476; 54°10′52″N 1°10′11″W	1150725	Newburgh Priory More images	
Church of St Andrew	Newton Kyme	Church	12th century	12 July 1985	SE4658044879; 53°53′53″N 1°17′33″W	1132464	Church of St Andrew More images	
Church of All Saints	High Street, Northallerton	Church	Saxon	23 April 1952	SE3672594200; 54°20′31″N 1°26′12″W	1150735	Church of All Saints More images	
Church of St Mary	Nun Monkton	Church	Late C12-Early 13th century	15 March 1966	SE5115357927; 54°00′53″N 1°13′15″W	1190942	Church of St Mary More images	
Church of All Saints and St James	Nunnington	Church	Late 13th century	14 July 1955	SE6659579072; 54°12′11″N 0°58′50″W	1149676	Church of All Saints and St James More images	
Nunnington Hall	Nunnington	House	Mid 16th century	14 July 1955	SE6703079481; 54°12′24″N 0°58′26″W	1168075	Nunnington Hall More images	
Church of All Saints	Old Byland, Old Byland and Scawton	Church	Late C11- early 12th century	4 January 1955	SE5507985951; 54°15′59″N 1°09′21″W	1149191	Church of All Saints More images	
Church of Saint Mary	Scawton, Old Byland and Scawton	Church	12th century	4 January 1955	SE5489783590; 54°14′42″N 1°09′33″W	1149196	Church of Saint Mary More images	
Church of St Patrick	Patrick Brompton	Church	Late 12th century	13 February 1967	SE2191090701; 54°18′41″N 1°39′53″W	1157773	Church of St Patrick More images	
Parish Church of St Peter and St Paul	Pickering	Church	Saxon	24 October 1950	SE7988884021; 54°14′44″N 0°46′32″W	1149369	Parish Church of St Peter and St Paul More images	
Baldersby Park House	Rainton with Newby	House/School	1718-21	10 July 1970	SE3878776282; 54°10′51″N 1°24′26″W	1150028	Baldersby Park House More images	
Ravensworth Castle and Park Wall	Ravensworth	Castle	Late 14th century	4 February 1969	NZ1420607648; 54°27′50″N 1°46′56″W	1166522	Ravensworth Castle and Park Wall More images	
Church of St Mary	Riccall	Church	Mid - Late 12th century	17 November 1966	SE6195937836; 53°49′59″N 1°03′36″W	1148464	Church of St Mary More images	
Grey Friars Tower	Richmond	Tower	Late 15th century	1 August 1952	NZ1710501040; 54°24′16″N 1°44′17″W	1212029	Grey Friars Tower More images	
Holy Trinity Church (now Green Howards Regimental Museum)	Richmond	Church/Museum	15th century	1 August 1952	NZ1712700882; 54°24′11″N 1°44′16″W	1096970	Holy Trinity Church (now Green Howards Regimental Museum) More images	
Richmond Castle	Richmond	Castle	11th century	1 August 1952	NZ1713800778; 54°24′08″N 1°44′15″W	1318398	Richmond Castle More images	
Georgian Theatre Royal	Richmond	Theatre	1788	1 August 1952	NZ1710700990; 54°24′15″N 1°44′17″W	1334316	Georgian Theatre Royal More images	
Doric Temple (Tuscan Temple)	Rievaulx Terrace, Rievaulx	Temple	1758	4 January 1955	SE5773284407; 54°15′08″N 1°06′55″W	1149251	Doric Temple (Tuscan Temple) More images	
Duncombe Park Gates and Railings	Duncombe Park Estate, Rievaulx	Gate	1845	18 March 1985	SE6035583006; 54°14′21″N 1°04′32″W	1149246	Upload Photo	
Ionic Temple	Rievaulx Terrace, Rievaulx	Temple	1758	4 January 1955	SE5793185072; 54°15′29″N 1°06′44″W	1315950	Ionic Temple More images	
Rievaulx Abbey	Rievaulx	Abbey	12th century	4 January 1955	SE5763284971; 54°15′26″N 1°07′01″W	1175724	Rievaulx Abbey More images	
Southern Stable Block	Duncombe Park Estate, Rievaulx	Wall	1846	18 March 1985	SE6038182944; 54°14′19″N 1°04′30″W	1149288	Southern Stable Block More images	
Church of Saint Andrew	Rillington	Church	12th century	10 October 1966	SE8526574343; 54°09′28″N 0°41′45″W	1149509	Church of Saint Andrew More images	
Gatehouse approximately 80 metres south of Ripley Castle	Ripley	Gatehouse	Medieval	8 March 1952	SE2826560529; 54°02′24″N 1°34′12″W	1174136	Gatehouse approximately 80 metres south of Ripley Castle More images	
Ripley Castle	Ripley Park, Ripley	House	Mid 16th century	8 March 1952	SE2822660557; 54°02′25″N 1°34′14″W	1315370	Ripley Castle More images	
Chapel of St Mary Magdalen	Ripon	Chapel	Medieval	27 May 1949	SE3172671779; 54°08′27″N 1°30′57″W	1150194	Chapel of St Mary Magdalen More images	
The Obelisk	Ripon	Obelisk	1702	27 May 1949	SE3121671270; 54°08′11″N 1°31′25″W	1315492	The Obelisk More images	
Ripon Minster (cathedral Church of St Peter and Wilfrid)	Ripon	Cathedral	14th century	27 May 1949	SE3144671129; 54°08′06″N 1°31′13″W	1150164	Ripon Minster (cathedral Church of St Peter and Wilfrid) More images	
Church of All Saints	Rudby	Church	14th century	23 June 1966	NZ4719206666; 54°27′12″N 1°16′25″W	1150240	Church of All Saints More images	
Church of All Saints	Ryther cum Ossendyke	Church	late Saxon/early Norman	3 February 1967	SE5550139409; 53°50′53″N 1°09′28″W	1148428	Church of All Saints More images	
St Martins Priory Ruins	St Martin's	Ruins	12th century	19 December 1951	NZ1775500745; 54°24′07″N 1°43′41″W	1131548	St Martins Priory Ruins More images	
Church of St John of Beverley	Salton	Church	Early 12th century	14 July 1955	SE7164079971; 54°12′38″N 0°54′11″W	1315726	Church of St John of Beverley More images	
Church of All Saints	Saxton	Church	11th century	3 February 1967	SE4757536883; 53°49′34″N 1°16′43″W	1168016	Church of All Saints More images	
Butter Cross	Scarborough	Market Cross	Medieval	22 December 1953	TA0471688840; 54°17′04″N 0°23′35″W	1243561	Butter Cross More images	
Church of St Martin	Scarborough	Parish Church	1861-62	8 June 1973	TA0420287774; 54°16′30″N 0°24′05″W	1242903	Church of St Martin More images	
Church of St Mary	Scarborough	Church	12th century	22 December 1953	TA0468089064; 54°17′11″N 0°23′36″W	1258195	Church of St Mary More images	
King Richard's House	Scarborough	House	medieval origin	22 December 1953	TA0488588808; 54°17′03″N 0°23′25″W	1243365	King Richard's House More images	
Church of St Martin	Seamer	Church	12th century	18 January 1967	TA0149983381; 54°14′10″N 0°26′39″W	1316472	Church of St Martin More images	
Church of St Mary and St Germain (Selby Abbey)	Selby	Abbey	1069	16 December 1952	SE6156832376; 53°47′03″N 1°04′01″W	1132591	Church of St Mary and St Germain (Selby Abbey) More images	
The Folly	Victoria Street, Settle	House	1670s	20 February 1958	SD8207563568; 54°04′04″N 2°16′31″W	1166834	The Folly More images	
Church of All Saints	Sherburn in Elmet	Church	15th century	3 February 1967	SE4880333525; 53°47′45″N 1°15′38″W	1148444	Church of All Saints More images	
Church of St Helen and the Holy Cross	Sheriff Hutton	Church	12th century	25 January 1954	SE6574066283; 54°05′18″N 0°59′47″W	1149591	Church of St Helen and the Holy Cross More images	
Sheriff Hutton Hall	Sheriff Hutton Park, Sheriff Hutton	Country House	1619-24	25 January 1954	SE6613965580; 54°04′55″N 0°59′26″W	1174671	Sheriff Hutton Hall More images	
Barn Approximately 10 Metres North East of the Hall	Sinnington	Barn	Before 1430	10 November 1953	SE7460786103; 54°15′55″N 0°51′22″W	1315676	Barn Approximately 10 Metres North East of the Hall More images	
Church of the Holy Trinity	High Street, Skipton	Church	14th century	28 April 1952	SD9903951914; 53°57′48″N 2°00′58″W	1131877	Church of the Holy Trinity More images	
Former chapel at Skipton Castle	The Bailey, Skipton	Chapel	Probably 13th century	28 April 1952	SD9904051982; 53°57′50″N 2°00′58″W	1131902	Former chapel at Skipton Castle More images	
Outer gatehouse to Skipton Castle	The Bailey, Skipton	Gatehouse	14th century	28 April 1952	SD9908651931; 53°57′48″N 2°00′56″W	1131901	Outer gatehouse to Skipton Castle More images	
Skipton Castle	The Bailey, Skipton	Castle	Mostly early 14th century	28 April 1952	SD9911651998; 53°57′51″N 2°00′54″W	1316962	Skipton Castle More images	
Church of Saint Helen	Skipwith	Church	Anglo Saxon	17 November 1966	SE6572638504; 53°50′19″N 1°00′10″W	1148467	Church of Saint Helen More images	
Foulbridge Farmhouse and Attached Cottage	Snainton	House	18th century	20 July 1981	SE9140279438; 54°12′09″N 0°36′01″W	1172918	Foulbridge Farmhouse and Attached Cottage More images	
Snape Castle	Snape, Snape with Thorp	Castle	c. 1430	5 May 1952	SE2619984382; 54°15′16″N 1°35′58″W	1190147	Snape Castle More images	
Church of Saint Mary	South Cowton	Church	15th century	31 March 1970	NZ2932002666; 54°25′07″N 1°32′59″W	1294728	Church of Saint Mary More images	
Cowton Castle	South Cowton	Castle	15th century	29 January 1953	NZ2945202382; 54°24′58″N 1°32′52″W	1294712	Cowton Castle More images	
Gatehouse to Steeton Hall and Walls Adjoining	South Milford	Gatehouse	Late 14th century	3 February 1967	SE4840331432; 53°46′37″N 1°16′01″W	1148546	Gatehouse to Steeton Hall and Walls Adjoining More images	
Steeton Hall	South Milford	House	Early 14th century	4 July 1952	SE4833831401; 53°46′36″N 1°16′05″W	1167763	Steeton Hall More images	
Church of St Michael	Spennithorne	Church	12th century	15 February 1967	SE1370888973; 54°17′46″N 1°47′27″W	1179485	Church of St Michael More images	
Stockeld Park House	Spofforth with Stockeld	Country House	1758-63	2 September 1952	SE3720549075; 53°56′11″N 1°26′05″W	1149986	Stockeld Park House More images	
Church of St Mary	Stainburn	Church	12th century	22 November 1966	SE2474648547; 53°55′57″N 1°37′29″W	1149989	Church of St Mary More images	
St John the Baptist's Church, Stanwick	Stanwick, Stanwick St. John	Church	13th century	4 February 1969	NZ1852011983; 54°30′10″N 1°42′56″W	1167219	St John the Baptist's Church, Stanwick More images	
Church of St Helen	Stillingfleet	Church	c. 1145	17 November 1966	SE5932541003; 53°51′43″N 1°05′58″W	1296904	Church of St Helen More images	
Hazlewood Castle	Hazlewood Castle Estate, Stutton with Hazlewood	Castle	Late 13th century	18 February 1958	SE4488339770; 53°51′08″N 1°19′09″W	1148386	Hazlewood Castle More images	
Roman Catholic Chapel of St Leonard	Hazlewood Castle Estate, Stutton with Hazlewood	Chapel	1609	3 February 1967	SE4492139795; 53°51′09″N 1°19′07″W	1316353	Roman Catholic Chapel of St Leonard More images	
Sutton Park	Main Street, Sutton on the Forest	Country House	1730-40	28 February 1952	SE5830364558; 54°04′25″N 1°06′38″W	1260322	Sutton Park More images	
Allerthorpe Hall	Gatenby Road, Swainby with Allerthorpe	Manor House	1608	5 May 1952	SE3301786768; 54°16′32″N 1°29′40″W	1150769	Upload Photo	
Gatepiers to Allerthorpe Hall	Swainby with Allerthorpe, Hambleton	Gatenby Road, Swainby with Allerthorpe	17th century	5 May 1952	SE3302486752; 54°16′31″N 1°29′40″W	1150770	Upload Photo	
Church of All Saints	Terrington	Church	11th century	25 January 1954	SE6719370766; 54°07′42″N 0°58′24″W	1315764	Church of All Saints More images	
Church of St Mary	Thirsk	Church	c. 1430	20 June 1966	SE4273782326; 54°14′06″N 1°20′45″W	1314935	Church of St Mary More images	
Church of St Helen	Thorganby	Church	15th century	17 November 1966	SE6896341641; 53°51′59″N 0°57′10″W	1148469	Church of St Helen More images	
Church of St Mary	Thornton in Craven	Church	Early 16th century	10 September 1954	SD9016148345; 53°55′52″N 2°09′05″W	1167634	Church of St Mary More images	
Danby Hall	Danby, Thornton Steward	Country House	14th century	15 February 1967	SE1587887143; 54°16′47″N 1°45′28″W	1130922	Danby Hall More images	
Thornton Watlass Hall and attached stable block	Thornton Watlass	Country House	1727	5 May 1952	SE2353586018; 54°16′09″N 1°38′24″W	1190159	Upload Photo	
Church of St Michael	Cowthorpe, Tockwith	Church (redundant)	1456-58	30 March 1966	SE4270052692; 53°58′07″N 1°21′02″W	1315417	Church of St Michael More images	
Walburn Hall	Walburn	Farmhouse	15th century	4 February 1969	SE1189695965; 54°21′33″N 1°49′06″W	1179695	Walburn Hall More images	
Church of St Andrew	Weaverthorpe	Church	12th century	10 October 1966	SE9666971102; 54°07′36″N 0°31′20″W	1175527	Church of St Andrew More images	
St Gregory's Minster	Kirkdale, Welburn, Kirkbymoorside	Sculpture	14th century	14 July 1955	SE6768785776; 54°15′47″N 0°57′44″W	1149213	St Gregory's Minster More images	
Church of St Michael	Church Street, Well	Church	12th century	22 August 1966	SE2681482059; 54°14′01″N 1°35′25″W	1315190	Church of St Michael More images	
Well Hall	Main Street, Well	House	1342	5 May 1952	SE2676382016; 54°13′59″N 1°35′27″W	1150773	Well Hall More images	
Church of Holy Trinity	Wensley	Church	15th century	13 February 1967	SE0920989535; 54°18′05″N 1°51′36″W	1130879	Church of Holy Trinity More images	
Ayton Castle	West Ayton	Pele Tower	Late 14th century	18 January 1967	SE9876585091; 54°15′07″N 0°29′08″W	1148147	Ayton Castle More images	
Church of Saint Oswald	West Hauxwell	Church	11th century	13 February 1967	SE1656093087; 54°19′59″N 1°44′49″W	1179762	Church of Saint Oswald More images	
Banqueting House Approximately 50 Metres East of Weston Hall	Weston Park, Weston	Banqueting House	Late C16-Early 17th century	22 November 1966	SE1786146738; 53°54′59″N 1°43′46″W	1150438	Banqueting House Approximately 50 Metres East of Weston Hall	
Church of All Saints	Weston Park, Weston	Church	Anglo-Saxon	22 November 1966	SE1774346624; 53°54′56″N 1°43′53″W	1150440	Church of All Saints More images	
Weston Hall	Weston Park, Weston	House	Mid 18th century	6 February 1952	SE1779846711; 53°54′58″N 1°43′50″W	1150437	Weston Hall More images	
Kirkham Priory	Westow	Wash House	13th century	11 February 1987	SE7356965801; 54°04′58″N 0°52′37″W	1149116	Kirkham Priory More images	
Church of St Nicholas	West Tanfield	Church	c. 1200	22 August 1966	SE2680078742; 54°12′13″N 1°35′26″W	1150775	Church of St Nicholas More images	
Marmion Tower	West Tanfield	Tower	14th century	22 August 1966	SE2677678718; 54°12′13″N 1°35′28″W	1190271	Marmion Tower More images	
Church of St Mary	Wharram-le-Street	Church	11th century	10 October 1966	SE8639365928; 54°04′55″N 0°40′51″W	1149064	Church of St Mary More images	
Captain Cooks House	Whitby	House	Earlier	23 February 1954	NZ9003011043; 54°29′12″N 0°36′42″W	1148246	Captain Cooks House More images	
Donkey Road (Church Lane)	Whitby	Trackway	Earlier	4 December 1972	NZ9005511280; 54°29′20″N 0°36′41″W	1148374	Donkey Road (Church Lane) More images	
Parish Church of St Mary	Whitby	Parish Church	c. 1110	23 February 1954	NZ9015011294; 54°29′20″N 0°36′35″W	1055865	Parish Church of St Mary More images	
The Abbey House	Whitby	House	Medieval	23 February 1954	NZ9023811118; 54°29′15″N 0°36′31″W	1055872	The Abbey House More images	
Garden Walls and Gatepiers to the Abbey House	Whitby	Gate Pier	Late 17th century	23 February 1954	NZ9022411247; 54°29′19″N 0°36′31″W	1148375	Garden Walls and Gatepiers to the Abbey House	
The Church Stairs	Whitby	Steps	First Mentioned 1370	23 February 1954	NZ9006011277; 54°29′20″N 0°36′40″W	1316348	The Church Stairs More images	
Whitby Abbey (ruins)	Whitby	Abbey	12th century	23 February 1954	NZ9030311217; 54°29′18″N 0°36′27″W	1316347	Whitby Abbey (ruins) More images	
Whitby Abbey Cross	Whitby	Cross	Medieval	23 February 1954	NZ9024211298; 54°29′20″N 0°36′30″W	1148373	Whitby Abbey Cross More images	
Abbey Stables	Whitby	House	17th century	23 February 1954	NZ9017711202; 54°29′17″N 0°36′34″W	1366588	Abbey Stables More images	
Old Church of Holy Rood	Whorlton	Church	Mid/Late 12th century	23 June 1966	NZ4832902446; 54°24′55″N 1°15′24″W	1294328	Old Church of Holy Rood More images	
Whorlton Castle gatehouse	Whorlton	Castle	14th century	23 June 1966	NZ4812202469; 54°24′55″N 1°15′36″W	1151332	Whorlton Castle gatehouse More images	
Church of All Saints	Wighill	Church	15th century	30 March 1966	SE4736046577; 53°54′47″N 1°16′50″W	1315379	Church of All Saints More images	
Church of St Peter	Wintringham	Church	12th century	10 October 1966	SE8872673175; 54°08′48″N 0°38′35″W	1175659	Church of St Peter More images	
Church of All Saints	Wistow	Church	13th century	17 November 1966	SE5923035655; 53°48′50″N 1°06′07″W	1174776	Church of All Saints More images	
Church of St Martin	Womersley	Church	12th century	11 December 1967	SE5323118984; 53°39′53″N 1°11′45″W	1174486	Church of St Martin More images	

== See also ==
- Grade I listed buildings in the City of York
- Grade I listed buildings in Redcar and Cleveland
- Grade I listed buildings in Middlesbrough (borough)
- Grade I listed buildings in Stockton-on-Tees
- Grade II* listed buildings in North Yorkshire (district)
