= Priest's House =

Priest's House or The Priest's House may refer to:

- A clergy house
- Priest's House, Barden in Barden, Craven, North Yorkshire, in England
- Priest's House, Easton on the Hill in Easton on the Hill, Northamptonshire, England
- Priest's House Museum, in Wimborne Minster, Dorset, England
- The Priest's House, Muchelney, in Somerset, England

== See also ==
- The Priest House, West Hoathly in West Sussex, England
