= Pyramid Gate =

Building in Castle Howard, North Yorkshire, England

Coordinates: 54°06′58″N 0°54′52″W

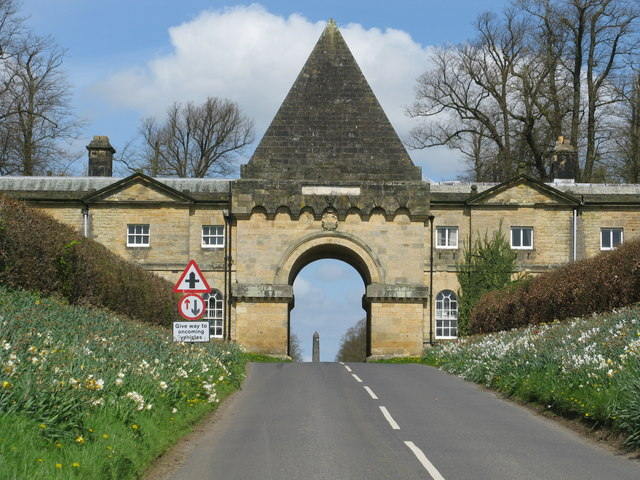
The gate, in 2018

The Pyramid Gate, also known as the Pyramid Gatehouse, is a historic building at Castle Howard, in North Yorkshire, in England.

The gate was designed by John Vanbrugh in 1716, and was completed in 1719. It forms part of a sequence of structures on the main route to the house at Castle Howard, and is north of the Carrmire Gate and south of The Obelisk. It is a variation on a design which Vanbrugh unsuccessfully proposed for gates at Kings Weston House. Vaughan Hart describes its crowning pyramid as "evok[ing] the idea of death at the very entrance to the estate".

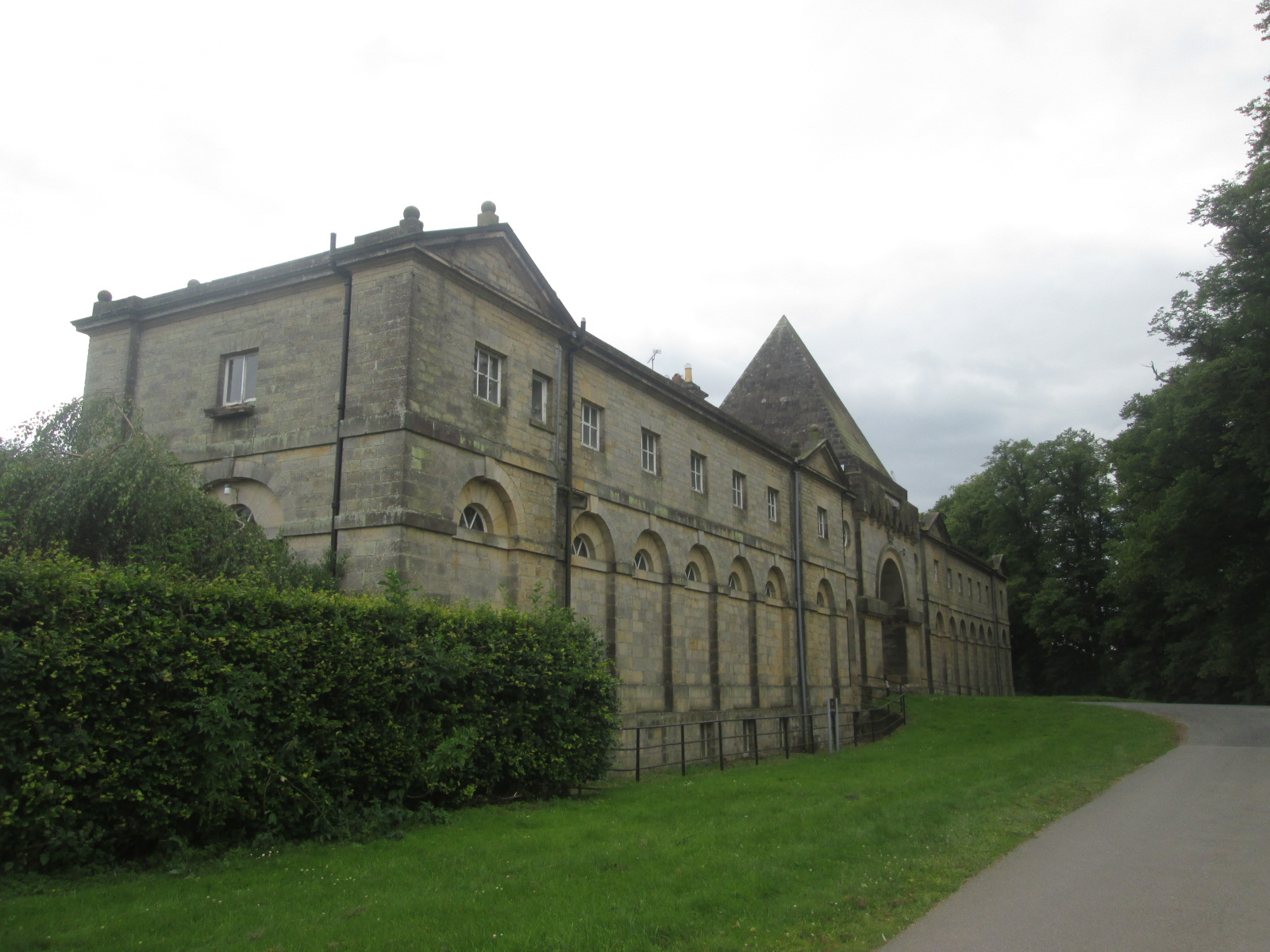
North front of the gatehouse

Walls were added either side of the gatehouse by Thomas Robinson in 1756. The left wing suffered a fire in 1923, and its interior was later entirely replaced. At the time, the building was used as a hotel. The main house was badly damaged during the Second World War, and so in 1949 George Howard, Baron Howard of Henderskelfe, temporarily moved into the gatehouse. The building was grade I listed in 1954.

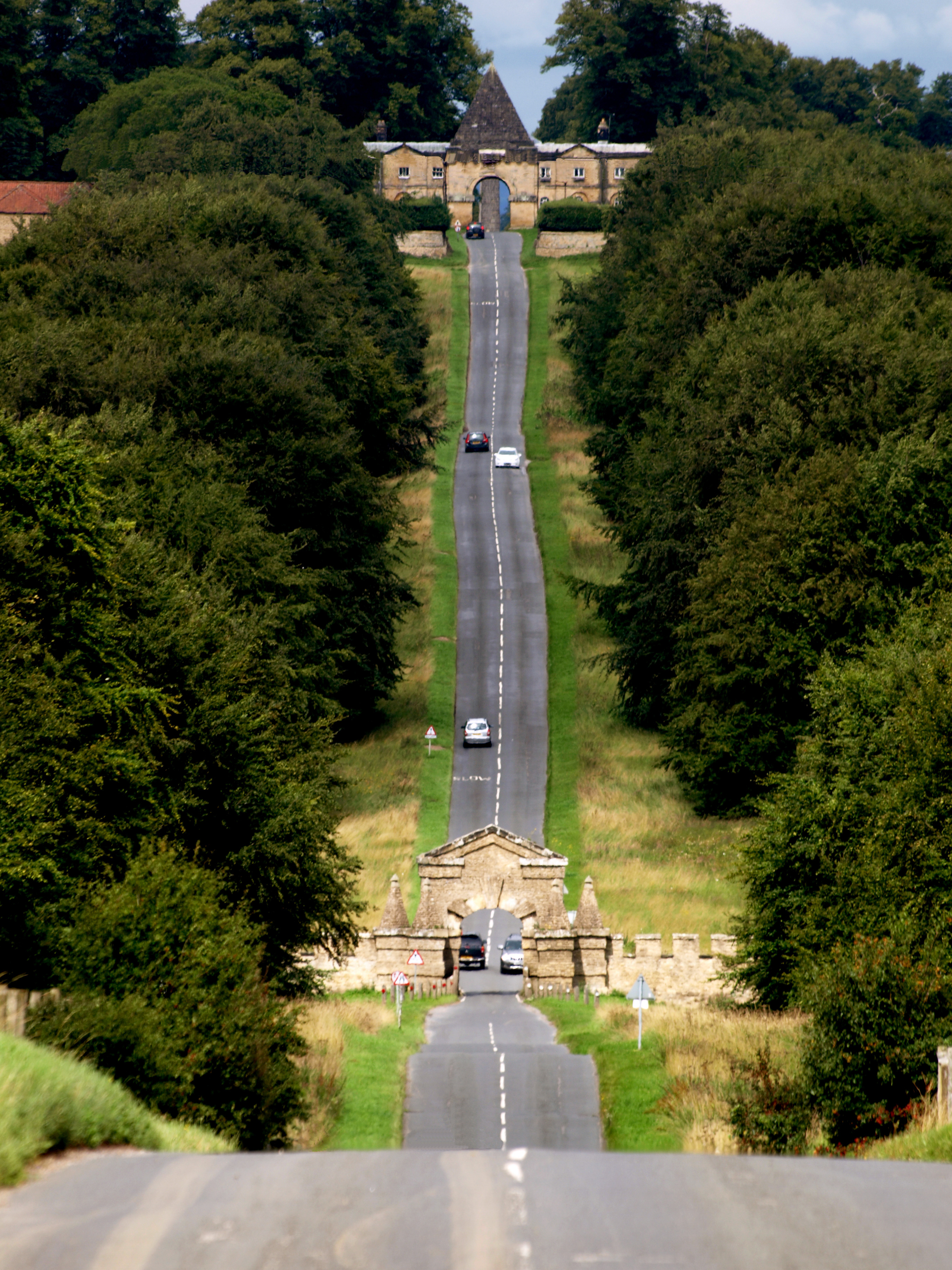
Long view of the route to Castle Howard, with the Pyramid Gate in the background

The gate is built of limestone on a chamfered plinth, and has a pyramidal stone slate roof surmounted by a pyramid. It contains a round arch with an impost band on consoles, and a band, above which is a coat of arms. There is machicolation over the arch with a keystone and an inscribed plaque, reading "Carolus Howard comes Carliolensis hoc condidit anno dni mdccxix". The flanking wings have two storeys and eight bays, the second and outer bays projecting under a pediment with a ball finial. In the ground floor are round-arched sash windows forming an arcade with an impost band and keystones. The upper floor contains sash windows in the left wing, and casements in the right wing. At the rear is a balcony on a Tuscan column, an L-shaped flight of stairs and a machicolated square turret.

== See also ==
- Grade I listed buildings in North Yorkshire (district)
- Listed buildings in Henderskelfe
