= Listed buildings in Old Byland and Scawton =

Old Byland and Scawton is a civil parish in the county of North Yorkshire, England. It contains 16 listed buildings that are recorded in the National Heritage List for England. Of these, two are listed at Grade I, the highest of the three grades, and the others are at Grade II, the lowest grade. The parish contains the villages of Old Byland and Scawton, and the surrounding countryside. The most important listed buildings are two churches, both listed at Grade I. The other listed buildings are houses and cottages, a bridge, a group of four limekilns, and three mileposts.

== Key ==
Grade	Criteria
I	Buildings of exceptional interest, sometimes considered to be internationally important
II	Buildings of national importance and special interest

== Buildings ==
Name and location	Photograph	Date	Notes	Grade
All Saints' Church, Old Byland; 54.26624°N 1.15590°W		Late 11th to early 12th century	The church has been altered and extended through the centuries, the chancel dates from the 15th century, and the church was restored in the 19th century. It is built in limestone, with quoins, and a Welsh slate roof. The church consists of a nave, a south porch-tower, and a chancel. The porch-tower contains a round-arched doorway with two orders of moulding, flanked by relocated early Norman capitals with carvings of dragons. On the east wall of the porch is an inscribed sundial.	I
St Mary's Church, Scawton; 54.24506°N 1.15910°W		12th century	The church has been altered and extended through the centuries, including a restoration in 1892 by C. Hodgson Fowler. It is built in limestone with a Welsh slate roof, and consists of a nave, a south porch, and a chancel. On the west gable end is a wooden bellcote. The porch contains a round-arched doorway with two moulded orders on colonnettes with scalloped capitals, and above it is a beaded hood mould.	I
Scawton Croft; 54.24959°N 1.12461°W	—	Early 18th century	The house is in limestone, with massive quoins, and a pantile roof with gable coping and shaped kneelers. There are two storeys, three bays, a brick outshut on the left, and a small rear cross-wing. On the front is a doorway and horizontally-sliding sash windows, all with channelled wedge lintels.	II
Old Rectory Farmhouse; 54.24445°N 1.15917°W	—	Early to mid-18th century	The house is in limestone, and has a roof partly of pantile and partly of Welsh slate. There are two storeys and four bays. The doorway has a divided fanlight, there is one small fixed window, and the other windows are sashes.	II
House south of West View; 54.26520°N 1.15637°W		Early to mid-18th century	The house is in limestone, with sprocketed eaves and has a Roman tile roof. There are two storeys and three bays. On the front is a doorway and a fire window, and the other windows are horizontally-sliding sashes.	II
Scawton Park; 54.24862°N 1.15949°W	—	Mid to late 18th century	The house is in limestone, and has a pantile roof with gable coping and shaped kneelers. There are two storeys, two bays, and a rear cross-wing. The doorway is in the centre and the windows are sashes.	II
Antofts; 54.23886°N 1.10948°W	—	Late 18th century	The house is in sandstone, and has a pantile roof with gable coping and shaped kneelers. The doorway is in the centre, and the windows are sashes with timber lintels.	II
Old Byland Hall; 54.26485°N 1.15641°W		Late 18th century	The house, which was extended in the middle of the 19th century, is in limestone, the roof of the earlier part is in Westmorland slate, and the roof of the later part is in Welsh slate. Both parts have two storeys, and each part has four bays. The older part contains a doorway with a radial fanlight, sash windows, and a Venetian window at the rear. On the later part is a doorway and a canted bay window, and the other windows have fixed lights.	II
Pond Farm; 54.24456°N 1.16008°W	—	Late 18th century	The house is in limestone, and has a pantile roof with sprocketed eaves, gable coping and shaped kneelers. There are two storeys, the main house has two bays, and the low house to the right has one bay. On the front are doorways, and casement windows, those in the main house with lintels and keystones.	II
West View Cottages; 54.26537°N 1.15635°W		Late 18th century	Three, later two, cottages in limestone with a French tile roof. There are two storeys, the left cottage has three bays, and the right cottage has one. On the front of the left cottage is a gabled porch, the right cottage has a doorway, and both cottages have horizontally-sliding sash windows.	II
Bow Bridge; 54.26312°N 1.12706°W		Late 18th to early 19th century (probable)	The bridge carries Arden Lane over the River Rye. It is in sandstone, and consists of a single segmental arch flanked by flat buttresses. The bridge has a band, and a coped parapet with drums at the ends.	II
Cross Green; 54.25208°N 1.12630°W		Late 18th to early 19th century	The house is in limestone, and has a pantile roof with coped gables. There are two storeys, two bays, and a cross-wing at the rear. The windows are three-light casements.	II
Limekilns; 54.26403°N 1.16650°W		19th century	The limekilns are in limestone, and their remains rise to a height of about 5 metres (16 ft). Two of them have retained a roof and a flue.	II
Milepost east of Spring Cottage and Greystones; 54.23989°N 1.18943°W		Late 19th century	The milepost on the south side of the A170 road is in cast iron, and has a triangular plan and a sloping top. On the top is inscribed "NRYCC", on the left face is the distance to Thirsk, and on the right face to Helmsley.	II
Milepost north of Cam House; 54.23084°N 1.16932°W	—	Late 19th century	The milepost on the south side of the A170 road is in cast iron, and has a triangular plan and a sloping top. On the top is inscribed "NRYCC", on the left face is the distance to Thirsk, and on the right face to Helmsley.	II
Milepost south of High Lodge; 54.22827°N 1.14409°W		Late 19th century	The milepost on the south side of the A170 road is in cast iron, and has a triangular plan and a sloping top. On the top is inscribed "NRYCC", on the left face is the distance to Thirsk, and on the right face to Helmsley.	II
