= John Oxlee =

English cleric, philologist and writer on theology (1779–1854)

John Oxlee (1779–1854) was an English cleric, philologist and writer on theology.

== Biography ==
Oxlee, son of a well-to-do farmer in Yorkshire, was born at Guisborough in Yorkshire, on 25 September 1779, and was educated at Sunderland. After devoting himself to business for a short time he studied mathematics and Latin, and made such rapid progress in Latin that in 1842 Dr. Vicesimus Knox appointed him second master at Tunbridge grammar school. While at Tunbridge he lost, through inflammation, the use of an eye, yet commenced studying Hebrew, Chaldee, and Syriac.

In 1805 he was ordained to the curacy of Egton, near Whitby. In 1811 he removed to the curacy of Stonegrave, from 1815 to 1826 he held the rectory of Scawton, and in 1836 the archbishop of York presented him to the rectory of Molesworth in Huntingdonshire.

Oxlee's power of acquiring languages, considering that he was self-educated, has rarely been excelled. He obtained a knowledge more or less extensive of 120 languages and dialects. In prosecuting his studies he was often obliged to form his own grammar and dictionary. He left among his numerous unpublished writings a work entitled "One hundred and more Vocabularies of such Words as form the Stamina of Human Speech, commencing with the Hungarian and terminating with the Yoruba", 1837–40. A large portion of his time he spent in making himself thoroughly conversant with the Hebrew law and in studying the Talmud. His only recreation was pedestrian exercise, and he at times walked fifty miles to procure a book in Hebrew or other oriental language.

He died at Molesworth rectory on 30 January 1854, leaving two children by his wife, a daughter of John R. A. Worsop of Howden Hall, Yorkshire: John Oxlee (d. 1892), vicar of Over Silton 1848, rector of Cowesby 1863 (both in Yorkshire), and an unmarried daughter, Mary Anna Oxlee.

== Works ==
In a study which Oxlee made of the Hebrew writings he was led to differ on many important points both from the Jewish and Christian interpreters. His most important work is The Christian Doctrine of the Trinity, the Incarnation, and the Atonement considered and maintained on the Principles of Judaism, 3 vols. 1815–50. During the thirty-four years which elapsed between the publication of the first and third volumes he was busy collecting materials. The work contains a mass of abstruse learning. He held that the rabbis were well aware of the doctrine of the Trinity, and that in the Talmuds the three persons of the Godhead are clearly mentioned and often referred to. In his Six Letters to the Archbishop of Canterbury, 1842–5, he stated his reasons for declining to take any part in the society for the conversion of the Jews, and his grounds for not believing in the personality of the devil. During ten years he corresponded with an Israelite respecting the differences between Judaism and Christianity. Seven letters, addressed to J. M., a Jew, are printed in the Jewish Repository, 1815–16.

His works included, with many controversial pamphlets and some sermons:

- Three Letters to the Archbishop Lawrence of Cashel on the Apocryphal Publications of his Grace (Enoch, Ezra, and Isaiah) on the Age of the Sepher Zoar and on the Two Genealogies of Christ as given in the Gospels of St. Matthew and St. Luke, 1854. Alexander Nicoll, regius professor of Hebrew at Oxford, was impressed by the number of extracts from Jewish writers contained in this volume, compiled by a scholar working alone.
- Three Letters to Mr. C. Wellbeloved, Tutor of the Unitarian College, York, on the Folly of separating from the Mother Church. To Charles Wellbeloved.

He also left many unpublished works, including an Armenian and an Arabic lexicon. He was a contributor to the Anti-Jacobin Review, Valpy's Classical Journal, the Christian Remembrancer, the Voice of Jacob, the Voice of Israel, the Jewish Chronicle, the Jewish Repository, the Yorkshireman, and Sermons for Sundays and Festivals.
