= The Mausoleum, Castle Howard =

Building in North Yorkshire, England

Coordinates: 54°07′02″N 0°53′19″W

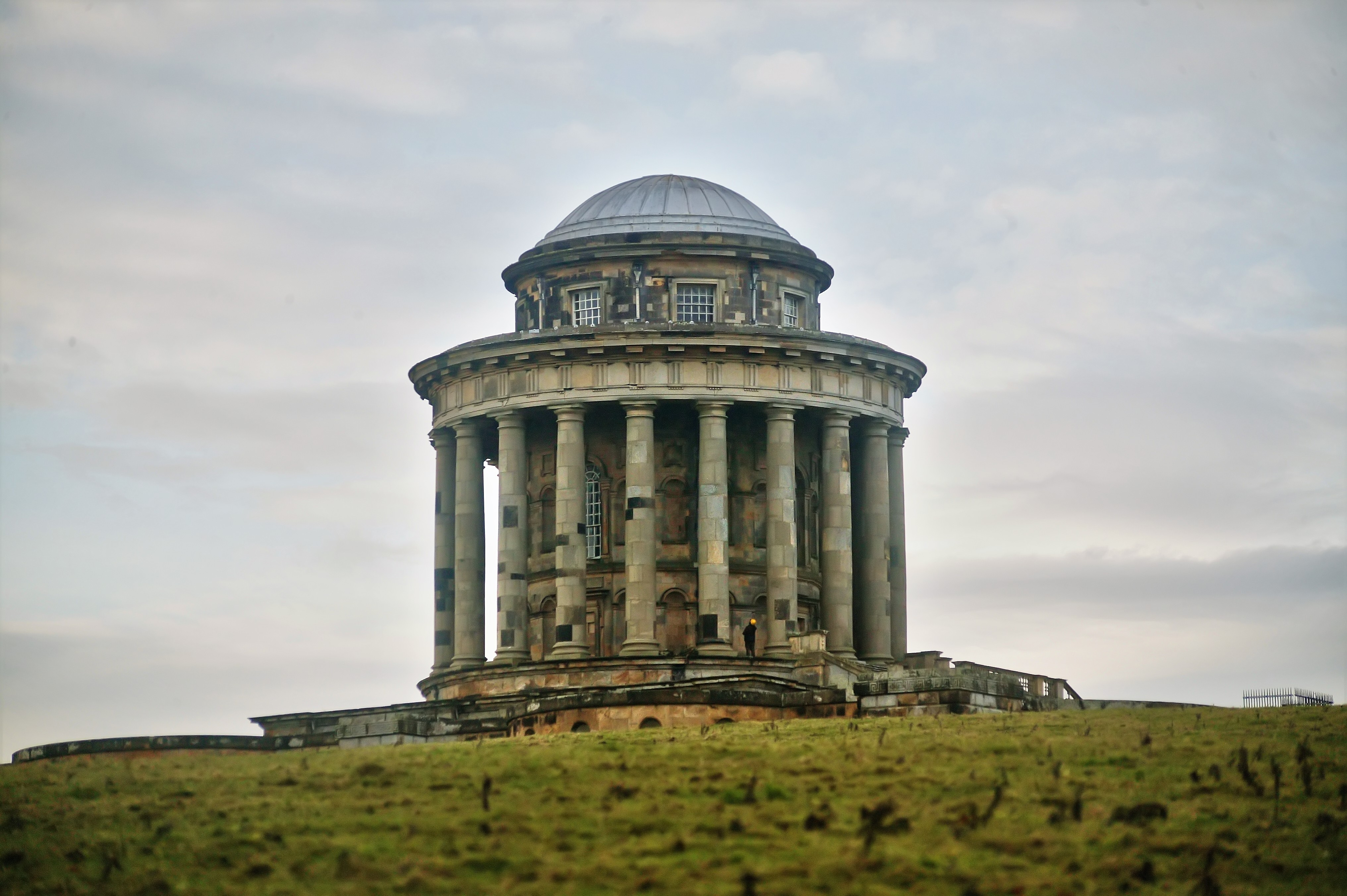
The Mausoleum, in 2017

The Mausoleum is a historic building on the Castle Howard estate in North Yorkshire, in England.

The mausoleum was designed by Nicholas Hawksmoor between 1726 and 1729, its design inspired by the Tomb of Caecilia Metella and the alleged Tomb of Lars Porsena. It was constructed by William Etty from 1729 to 1742, and bastion walls were added by Daniel Garrett. The interior carvings were undertaken by Charles Mitley. The building was commissioned by Charles Howard, 3rd Earl of Carlisle, to commemorate his family's history. Horace Walpole was highly impressed, and described it as a building which "would tempt one to be buried alive". It was grade I listed in 1954.

The building is constructed of sandstone with a lead roof, and consists of a circular mortuary chapel with a crypt on a square plinth, on which is a peristyle of 20 Doric columns and an entablature with a domed roof. The entrance to the crypt has an ornamental wrought iron gate with a channelled lintel and a massive keystone, flanked by pilasters and a double flight of steps. The bastion walls have squared rusticated projections between which are semicircular projections, with Greek key friezes, decorated gates and lancet railings. Inside, the crypt is vaulted and contains 63 catacombs. The cella has Corinthian columns recessed into the walls, with an elaborate entablature and a coffered ceiling.

== See also ==
- Grade I listed buildings in North Yorkshire (district)
- Listed buildings in Henderskelfe
