= King Richard's House =

Historic building in Scarborough, England

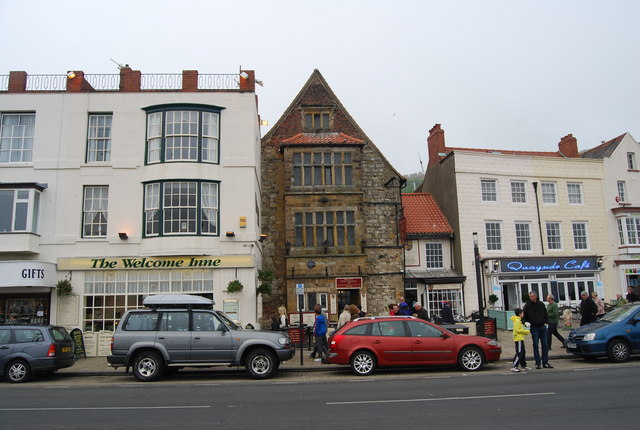
The building, in 2010

King Richard's House is a historic building in Scarborough, North Yorkshire, a town in England.

The house was built on Sandside in the Mediaeval period. A local tradition states that Richard III of England stayed in the house while visiting the town. The building was altered in the 16th century, at which time it appears to have been a larger hall house. It was later reduced to its current size, and the ground floor facade was replaced in the 18th century. A large bay window was removed in the 19th century, but a replica was built in 1912. The building was grade I listed in 1953. In the 21st century, it houses the King Richard III Restaurant.

The house is built of stone, with brickwork in the gable head, and a pantile roof. There are three storeys and an attic, and one bay. On the attic is a three-light mullioned window with a hood mould. Below is a three-storey square bay window, with a doorway on the ground floor, and mullioned and transomed windows on the upper floors. To the right is a lower stuccoed extension with two storeys and an attic, and one bay. On the ground floor is a shop window and a doorway with a divided fanlight to the left, and a multi-pane window above. There is also a grotesque effigy of Richard III, which was relocated from Newark on Trent. Inside, the second floor front room has 16th-century plasterwork on the ceiling, depicting the Yorkshire rose and arms of Richard III.

== See also ==
- Grade I listed buildings in North Yorkshire (district)
- Listed buildings in Scarborough (Castle Ward)
