= Butter Cross, Scarborough =

Historic structure in Scarborough, England

Coordinates: 54°17′04″N 0°23′35″W

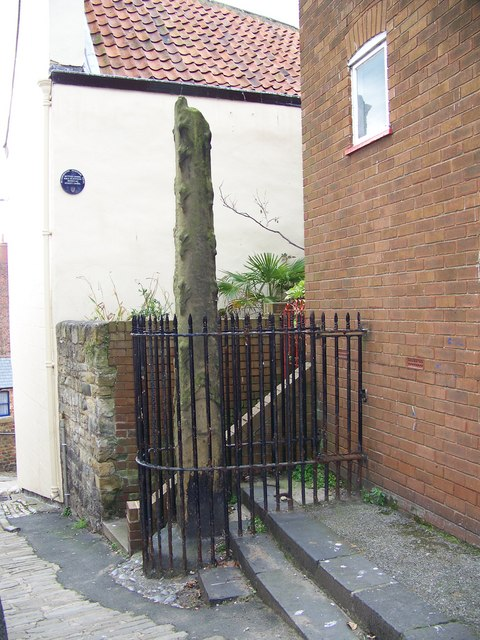
The Butter Cross, in 2007

The Butter Cross is a historic structure in Scarborough, North Yorkshire, a town in England.

There were several markets in Mediaeval Scarborough, one of which was held in what is now Princess Square. Its location was marked by two crosses: the Red Cross and the Butter Cross. The Butter Cross was first recorded in the 14th century. However, the Scarborough Civic Society claims it is likely that it was replaced in the mid-16th century, by the pinnacle of a church which was demolished - either one of the friary churches or from the Chapel of the Holy Sepulchre. The town's other market crosses were taken down by the 19th century, at which time a Saturday Market took place in Princess Square. It later moved to Newborough, and then into the purpose-built market hall.

The structure is constructed of stone, and consists of a base and a shaft, with carved crocket-type leaves running up the angles. It has been grade I listed since 1953.

== See also ==
- Grade I listed buildings in North Yorkshire (district)
- Listed buildings in Scarborough (Castle Ward)
