= Captain Cook Memorial Museum =

- Captain Walker's House

- Location within North Yorkshire
- Established: 1986
- Location: Whitby, North Yorkshire
- Coordinates: 54.4867°N 0.6118°W
- Type: Maritime Museum
- Public transit access: Bus/Railway Stations 0.3 miles (0.48 km)
- Website: Official website

Listed Building – Grade I
- Designated: 23 February 1954
- Reference no.: 1148246

Captain Cook Memorial Museum is a history museum in Whitby, North Yorkshire, England. The museum building, Walker's House, belonged to Captain John Walker, to whom James Cook was apprenticed in 1746. Having lodged there as an apprentice, Cook returned to visit in the winter of 1771–72 after his first voyage.

== House ==
The house is situated in Grape Lane on the harbour side. A plaque on the wall states that the house was built in 1688 by Moses and Susannah Dring. It is a largish building on three floors with an attic. It is regarded as a typical example of a well-to-do ship-owner's house of the period. Much is known about the furnishings of the house from an inventory of contents taken in 1754. The two ground floor rooms are furnished according to this inventory and decorated in the original colour.

== History ==
The property was bought in 1729 by the father of Captain John Walker, and became his home and place of business. He was also a captain in the merchant marine and developed the family's shipping business. He died in 1743, and in his will (Borthwick Institute, York), divided his ships between his sons John and Henry, but left the house to them as tenants in common. The brothers allowed their mother to continue to live in the house. After the deaths of his mother and brother, John Walker moved into the house by 1755. The house remained in the family until the mid 19th century and then was used by turns as a hospital and as a private residence until rescued in 1986 to become the Captain Cook Memorial Museum.

Cook was introduced in 1746 to Captain John Walker by William Sanderson, the grocer for whom Cook had worked in Staithes, a nearby fishing village. Walker took him on as apprentice seaman for a three-year term. Cook served Walker first as apprentice, then as seaman and lastly as master's mate until he joined the Royal Navy in 1755. He spent most of his time at sea on Walker's colliers, mainly in the coal trade between the Tyne and London but including voyages to the Baltic and Dublin.

The Whitby historian George Young, in his ‘Life of Cook’ of 1836, stated that during Cook's apprenticeship Walker retained Cook in Whitby on occasion and lodged him in the attic of the house in Grape Lane. There should be no difficulty in accepting this account even though Walker lived elsewhere at the time. Apprentices’ indentures of 1735 and 1758 (held in the Museum) show that shipowners tended to avoid obligation to lodge apprentices in their homes, preferring to release them during the winter months to go home to their families in Whitby and the surrounding countryside. If an apprentice was retained ashore, he would either be boarded in the town, or anywhere convenient such as the house in Grape Lane where there was space.

Young also described Cook studying in the attic with the aid of candles provided by Mary Prowd, a family servant. Like any ambitious apprentice, Cook would have studied algebra, geometry, trigonometry and navigation, probably with the help of schoolmasters paid for by the ship owners.

The house was also the scene of Cook's only known visit to the town after 1755. This was in the winter of 1771–72. Cook was staying in Great Ayton, and ‘took horse’ to visit his old master in Whitby. When Cook arrived, the household was lined up to greet him, and told to behave well. The elderly housekeeper, Mary Prowd, who had befriended Cook a quarter century before, could not restrain herself. Flinging her arms round the great man, she cried "Oh honey James! How glad I is to see thee!"

== Archaeology ==
Investigations carried out in 2001 revealed:

- The foundations of a range of small buildings interpreted as outbuildings associated with the Walkers’ shipping business
- A brick floor in a herring-bone pattern lying next to the house about a metre below today's ground level. A ‘brick-floored room’ a kitchen by its contents, was referred to in the inventory of 1754, but its location was unknown until now.
- A slipway, leading down from the main building to the river, with deposits above it dating from the mid-late 18th century. The courtyard, a metre or so above the slipway was built over it as the Walker family moved out of ship-owning into banking and insurance.

== Museum ==
The acquisition of Walker's House by the Cook Museum Trust enabled the Trust to establish a museum in Whitby dedicated to the celebration of the life of Captain Cook and the scientists, artists and crews who sailed with him. The collections comprise original letters about the Voyages including correspondence of Cook, Lord Sandwich, Sir Joseph Banks and the Forsters, paintings and drawings by the artists who went with Cook to the Pacific, including Sydney Parkinson, William Hodges, and John Webber, artefacts from the Pacific islands and New Zealand, original maps and charts, and ship models.

In 2009 a local newspaper reported that Matavai Bay Otaheite, a painting by William Hodges from the 1770s, was bought by the museum with help from several charities and trusts including The Art Fund. The painting depicts Matavai Bay, Tahiti which Cook visited on his second voyage.

Welcome to Yorkshire (formally the Yorkshire Tourist Board) gave the museum a White Rose Award in 2005 and 2012 and it was a winner of a VisitEngland Gold Award for Excellence in 2013.

== See also ==
- Grade I listed buildings in North Yorkshire (district)
- Listed buildings in Whitby (central area - east)
