= Old Byland and Scawton =

Civil parish in North Yorkshire, England

Coordinates: 54.253°N 1.156°W

- Civil parish
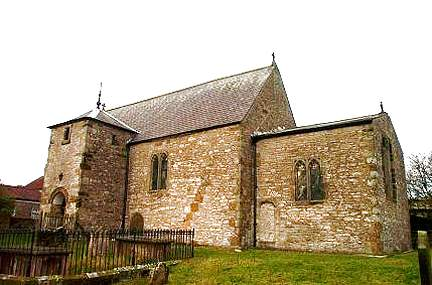
- All Saints' Church, Old Byland

- Location within North Yorkshire
- Population: 120 (2015 estimate)
- Unitary authority: North Yorkshire
- Ceremonial county: North Yorkshire
- Region: Yorkshire and the Humber
- Country: England
- Sovereign state: United Kingdom

Old Byland and Scawton is a civil parish in the county of North Yorkshire, England. The parish includes the villages of Old Byland and Scawton. At the 2001 census, the civil parish was accounted for with the parish of Cold Kirby, and had a population of 232, which had dropped to 205 at the 2011 census. In 2015, North Yorkshire County Council estimated the population of the Old Byland and Scawton Parish to be 120. The parish touches Boltby, Byland with Wass, Cold Kirby, Hawnby, Kilburn High and Low, Oldstead, Rievaulx and Sproxton.

The civil parish was part of the Ryedale district between 1974 and 2023, but now forms part of the unitary authority of North Yorkshire.

The Cleveland Way long distance footpath passes through the civil parish. There are 16 listed buildings in Old Byland and Scawton.

== History ==
The parish was formed on 1 April 1986 from "Old Byland" and "Scawton".

== See also ==
- Listed buildings in Old Byland and Scawton
