= St Oswald's Church, Horton in Ribblesdale =

Church in North Yorkshire, England

Coordinates: 54°08′40″N 2°17′32″W

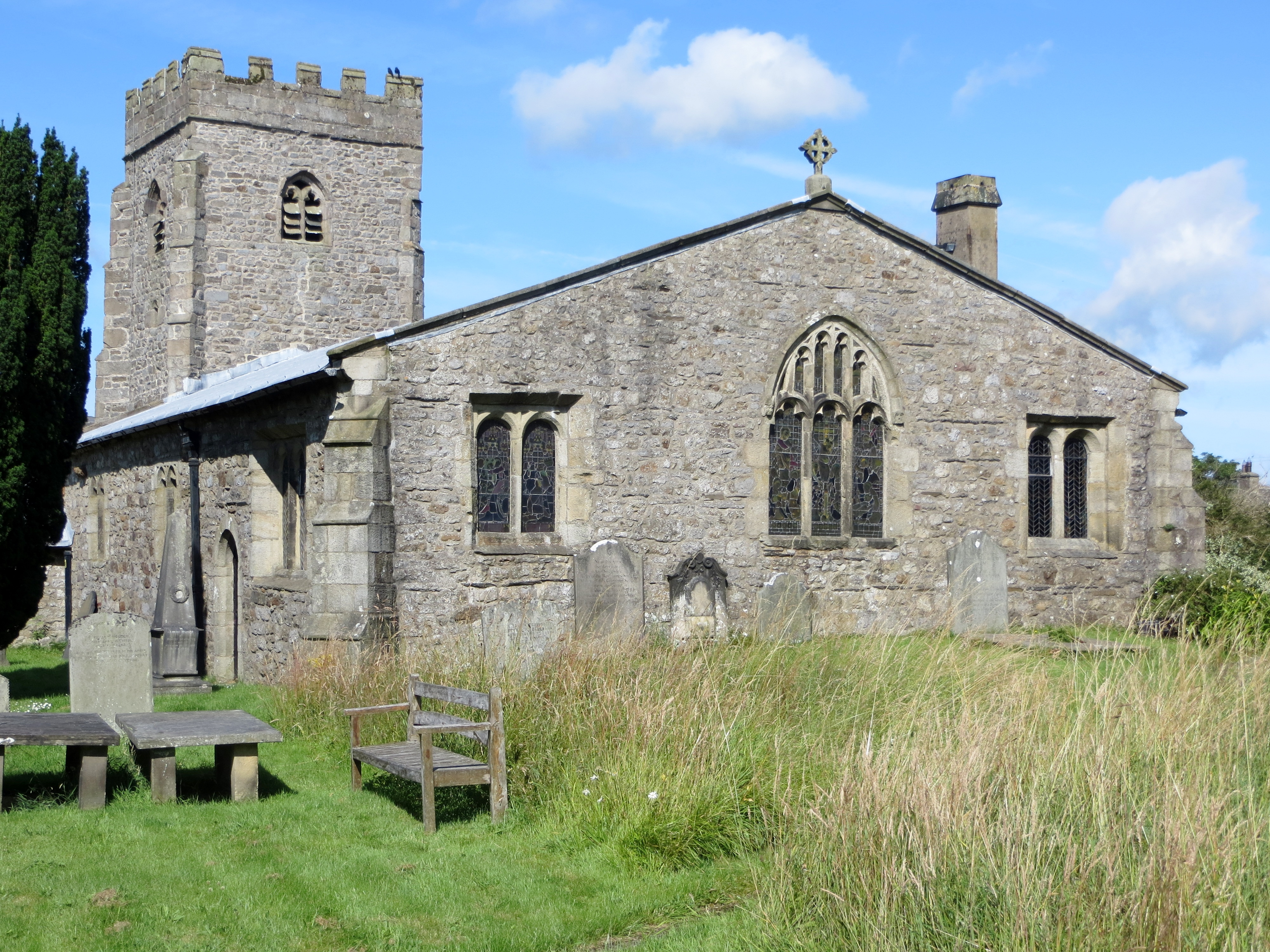
The church, in 2014

St Oswald's Church is the parish church of Horton in Ribblesdale, a village in North Yorkshire, in England.

The church was built in the 12th century, from which period the nave survives. Most of the remainder of the building is 15th century, but the church was heavily restored from 1823 to 1825, with the north aisle being rebuilt. Between 1879 and 1880, the roofing of the aisles was altered, so they now follow the same slope as the nave roof. The church was grade I listed in 1958, and the doorway was restored in 1980. Although the church is now dedicated to Saint Oswald of Northumbria, it was formerly dedicated to Saint Thomas Becket.

The church is built of stone with a lead roof, and consists of a nave, north and south aisles, a south porch, a chancel with north and south chapels, and a west tower. The tower has three stages, diagonal buttresses, and a west entrance with a moulded surround, a pointed arch and a hood mould, above which is a three-light Perpendicular window, a small trefoil window, two-light bell openings, a string course, and an embattled parapet. The porch is gabled and has a segmental-arched entrance, and the doorway is Norman, with zigzag decoration. The font is also Norman, with a zigzag decoration.

== See also ==
- Grade I listed buildings in North Yorkshire (district)
- Listed buildings in Horton in Ribblesdale
