= Bedale Market Cross =

Monument in Bedale, North Yorkshire, England

Coordinates: 54°17′22″N 1°35′35″W

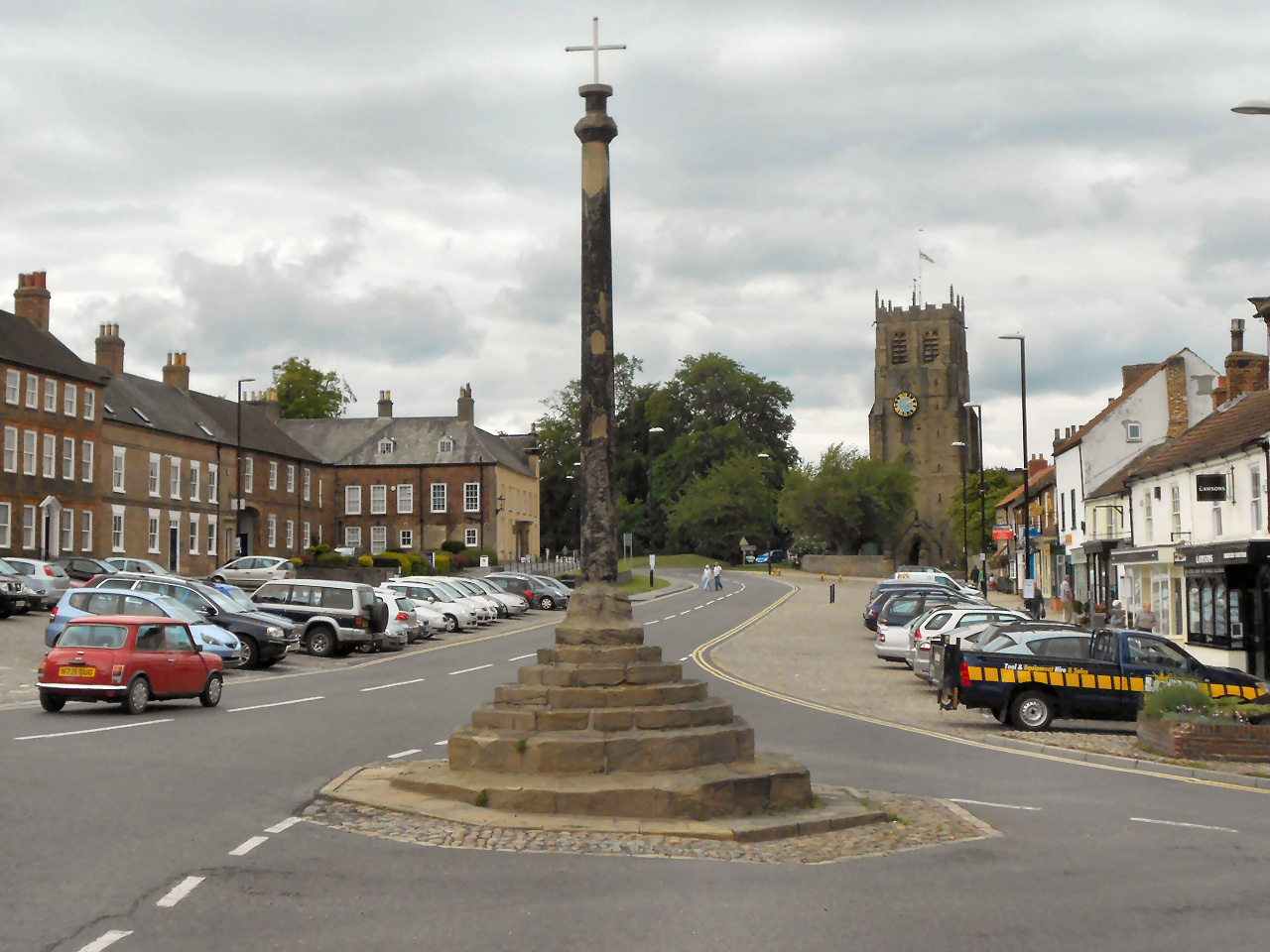
The cross, in 2011

Bedale Market Cross is a historic monument in Bedale, a town in North Yorkshire, in England.

Bedale was granted a market charter in 1251, and in the 14th century the current cross was erected at the north end of the marketplace, where the town's three medieval streets converge. In the 17th century, the original cross head was replaced by a simple iron cross. It was listed as a scheduled monument in 1936, and as a Grade I listed building in 1966.

The cross consists of an octagonal stone base with seven steps, the lowest step being 5 metres across. This stepped cross form is the most common type of Mediaeval standing cross in England. The octagonal cross shaft sits in a socket stone, and is 3.5 metres high. It has a projecting band near the top, and flat plinth at the top. This supports the iron cross.

== See also ==
- Grade I listed buildings in North Yorkshire (district)
- Listed buildings in Bedale
