= Carrmire Gate =

Folly in North Yorkshire, England

Coordinates: 54°06′27″N 0°54′43″W

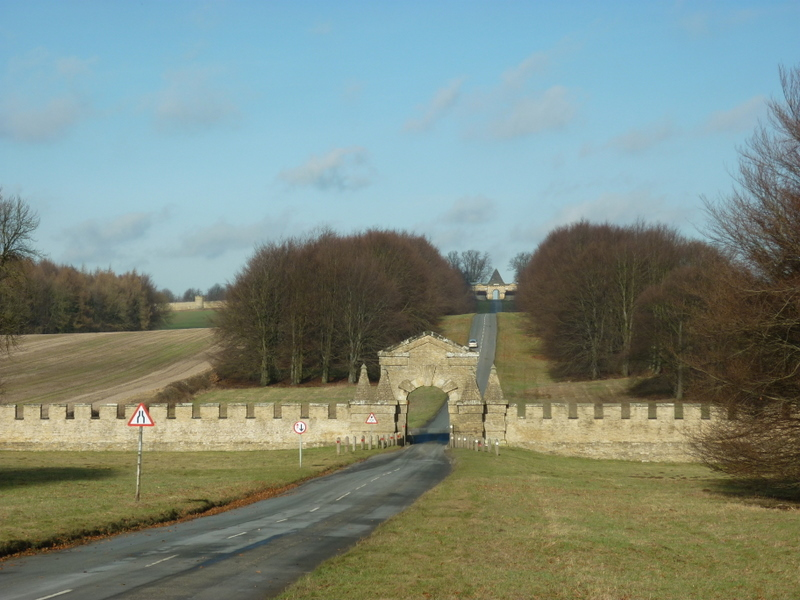
The gate, in 2011

The Carrmire Gate is a folly forming part of the estate landscape of Castle Howard, a country house in North Yorkshire, in England.

The gate with its towers and flanking walls was constructed in 1725, to a design by Nicholas Hawksmoor. It is the first in a succession of structures encountered by a visitor travelling to the house, but was the last built. It is smaller and more decorative than the next, the Pyramid Gate. At the edge of the estate, it would have originally marked the transition from open fields to the estate's deer park; although in a dip, the openness of the landscape would have made it a prominent landmark.

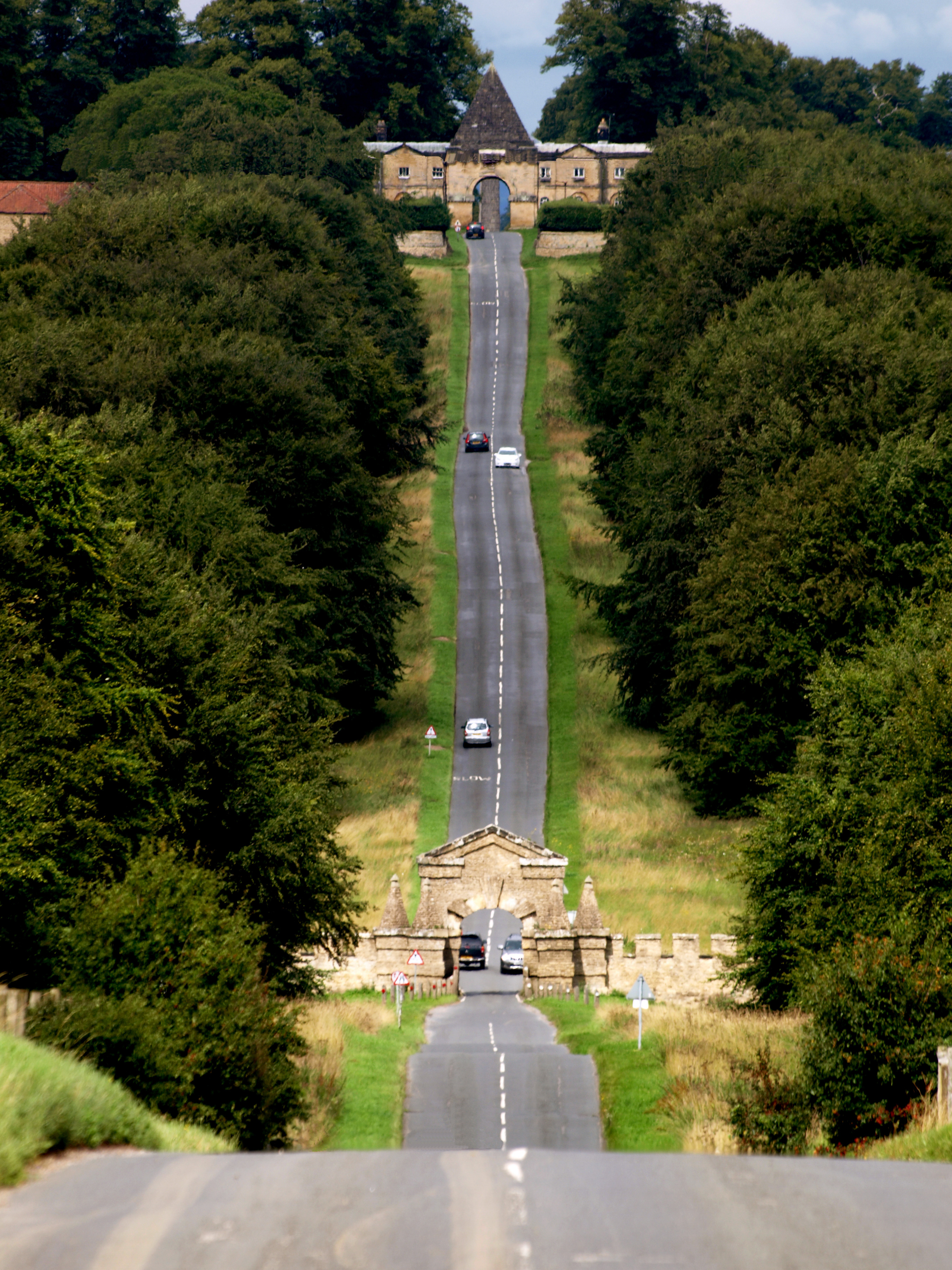
Long view of the route to Castle Howard, with the Carrmire Gate in the foreground

John Dixon Hunt describes the gate as "very theatrical – pure stage set and, since its extent is so short, clearly incapable of doing any defending at all". Vaughan Hart describes it as "an exercise in effecting ... feelings of awe and wonder in the visitor".

The structure is in the Italianate style, reminiscent of the work of Giulio Romano. It is built of limestone. The gateway has a round arch with a triple keystone and an open pediment, flanked by square rusticated piers, surmounted by six pyramids. On each side is an embattled wall extending for about 30 metres (98 ft), and ending in mock medieval turrets, with two stages, cruciform arrow slits and embattled parapets. It has been Grade I listed since 1954.

== See also ==
- Grade I listed buildings in North Yorkshire (district)
- Listed buildings in Bulmer, North Yorkshire
