= St Mary's Church, Scawton =

Church in Scawton, North Yorkshire, England

Coordinates: 54°14′42″N 1°09′33″W

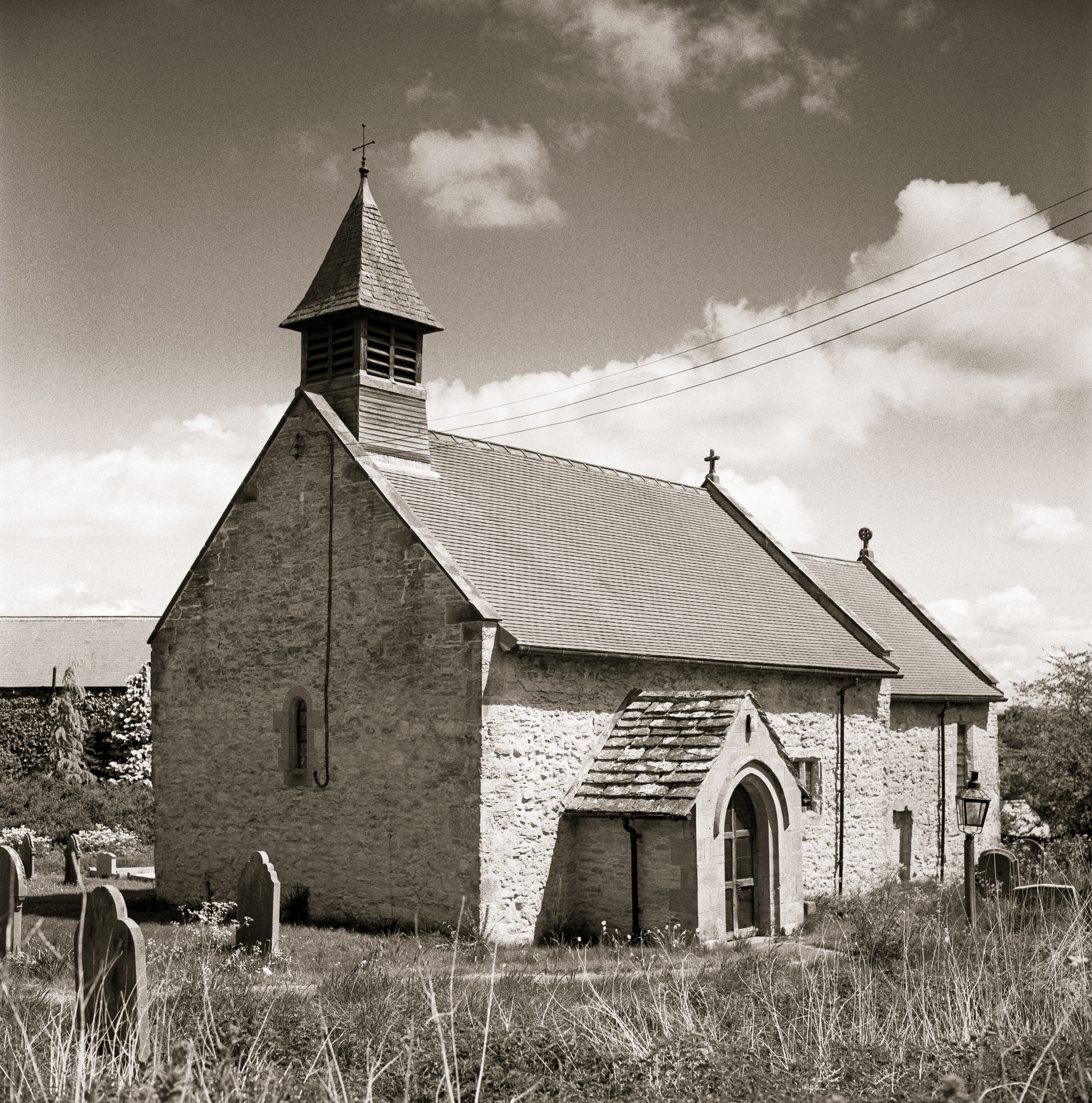
The church, in 2016

St Mary's Church is the parish church of Scawton, a village in North Yorkshire, in England.

The church was built in the middle of the 12th century. Most of the windows have been altered, particularly in the 15th century. The building was restored in 1892 by C. Hodgson Fowler, who added a porch. The church was grade I listed in 1955.

The church is built of limestone with a Welsh slate roof, and consists of a nave, a south porch, and a chancel. On the west gable end is a wooden bellcote. The porch contains a round-arched doorway with two moulded orders on colonnettes with scalloped capitals, and above it is a beaded hood mould. Inside, there is a niche to the left of the altar with a trough and two columns, probably a lavatorium which may have been brought from elsewhere. To the right of the altar is an aumbry, piscina and sedile. There is a round font which may be Norman but has a later base and a 17th-century octagonal wooden cover.

== See also ==
- Grade I listed buildings in North Yorkshire (district)
- Listed buildings in Old Byland and Scawton
