= Whitby Abbey Cross =

Historic structure in Whitby, North Yorkshire

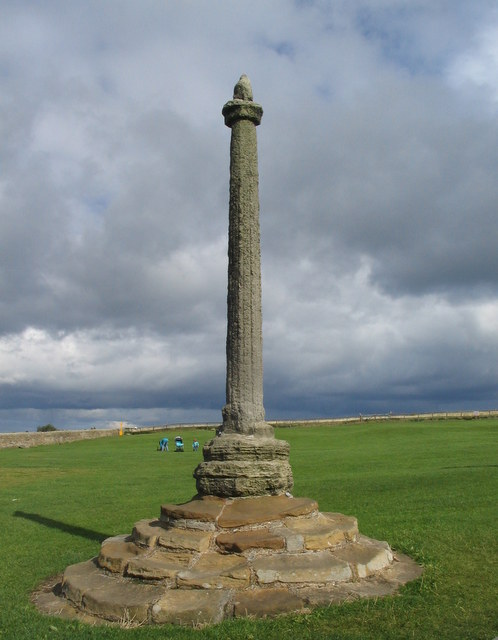
- The 14th-century cross on Abbey Plain, with Whitby Abbey beyond
- Interactive map of Whitby Abbey Cross
- Location: Abbey Plain, Whitby, North Yorkshire, England
- Coordinates: 54.4882°N 0.6074°W
- Designer: Unknown
- Type: Market cross / Standing cross
- Material: Sandstone
- Beginning date: 14th century

Designations

Listed Building – Grade I
- Designated: 1915 (Scheduled) / Listed Grade I
- Reference no.: 1148373

Whitby Abbey Cross (also known as the Abbey Plain Cross) is a 14th-century stone standing cross and Grade I listed building situated on Abbey Plain, immediately north of the ruins of Whitby Abbey in Whitby, North Yorkshire, England.

The monument forms part of an internationally important group of Grade I listed structures on the East Cliff headland, including the abbey church ruins and Abbey House.

== History ==
=== Medieval monastic cross ===
The cross was erected in the 14th century within the precinct of the Benedictine abbey. It originally stood near the monks' cemetery north of the abbey church.

Following the Dissolution of the Monasteries under King Henry VIII in 1539, the cross was retained on Abbey Plain. Over subsequent centuries, the elevated open ground around the cross became a focal point for public assemblies, local markets, and annual fairs.

=== Statutory protection ===
The cross is protected both as a Grade I listed building and as an integral component of the Whitby Abbey Scheduled Monument complex.

== Description ==
Constructed of local Yorkshire sandstone, the monument retains its medieval shaft and capital, though the cross head itself was lost in antiquity.

The structure rests on a monumental stepped base comprising six stone steps, believed to have been rebuilt or consolidated following the dissolution. A well-preserved 14th-century panelled stone shaft rises from a square socket stone. The shaft is surmounted by a carved medieval capital.

== See also ==
- Grade I listed buildings in North Yorkshire (district)
- Listed buildings in Whitby (central area - east)
