= St Nicholas' Church, North Grimston =

Parish church of North Grimston

Coordinates: 54°05′57″N 0°42′53″W

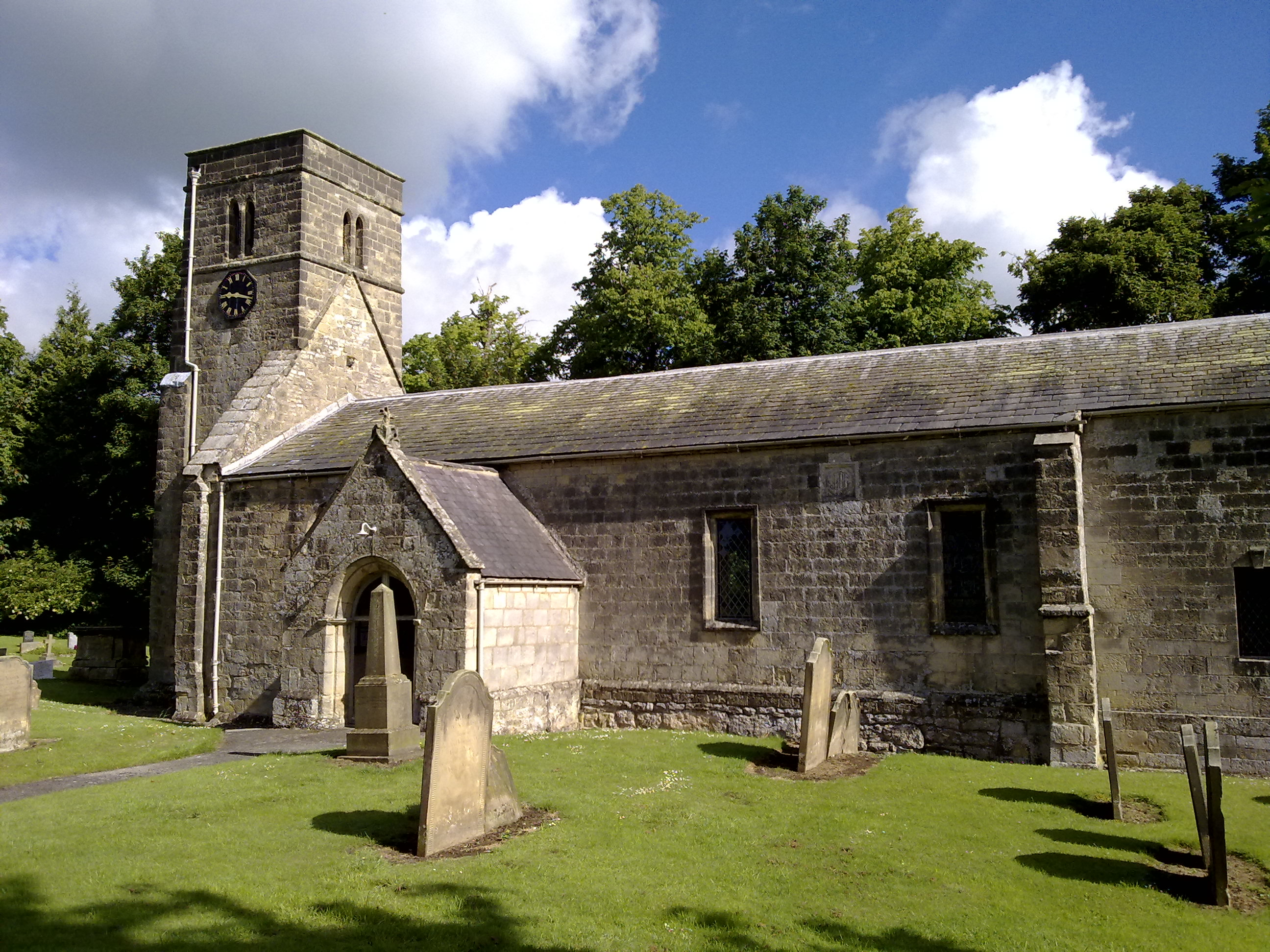
The church, in 2009

St Nicholas' Church is the parish church of North Grimston, a village in North Yorkshire, in England.

The church was built in the 12th century. Its tower was added in the 13th century, and a vicarage was built nearby in 1408. The east window was added in the 15th century, and the church was extended in the 17th century. It was restored in 1886 by George Fowler Jones, and was Grade I listed in 1966.

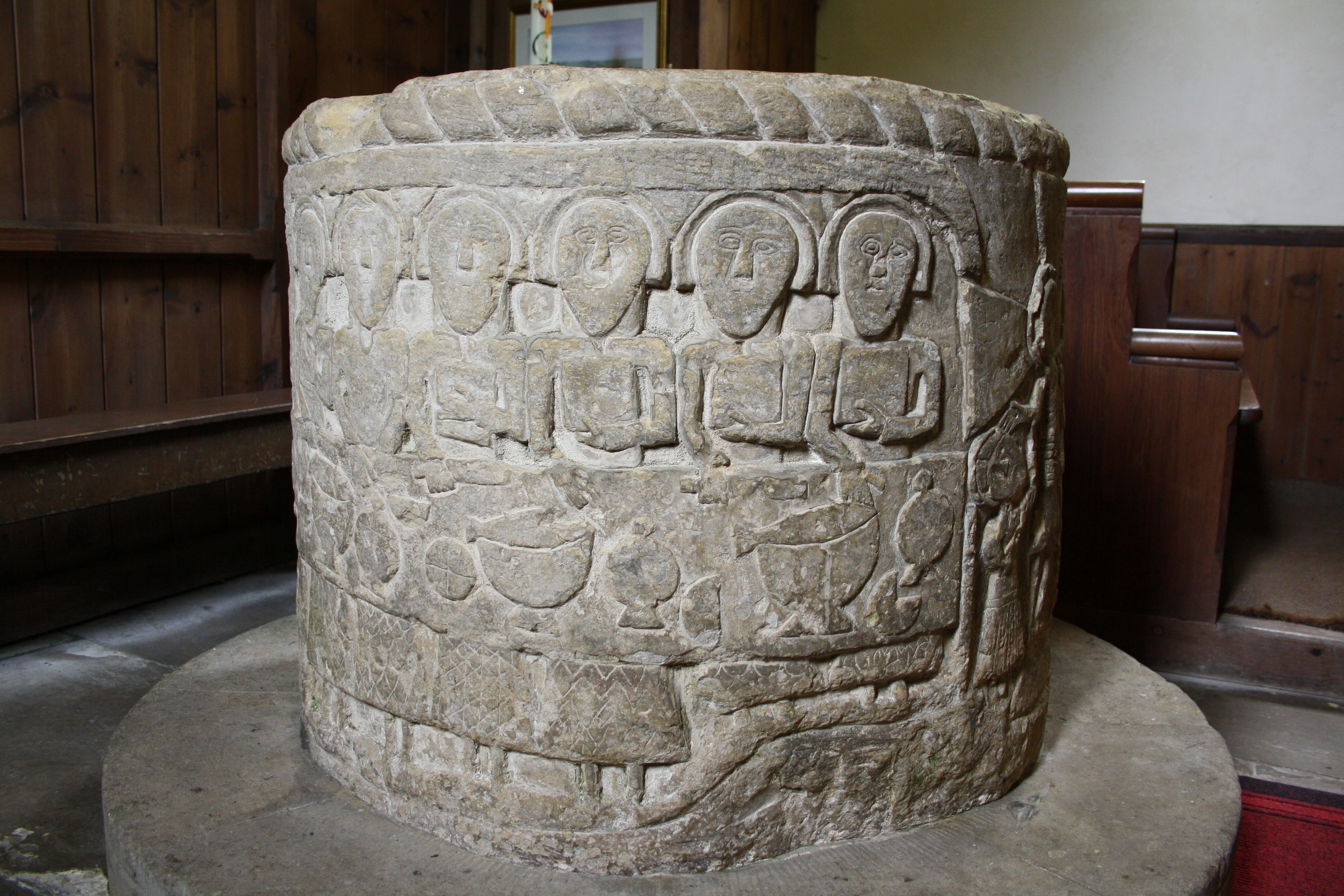
The font

The church is built of stone, and consists of a four-bay nave with a south porch, a three-bay chancel, and a west tower. At the west end is a lancet window, and an early-13th century sculpture. This is described by Historic England as depicting Saint Nicholas, but the Corpus of Romanesque Sculpture describes it as showing a bishop. The bell openings are paired with pointed heads, and the parapet is plain and coped. In the nave are opposing round-arched doorways. The north doorway is plain with a reset Anglo-Danish stone above, depicting two beasts facing each other. The south doorway has two orders, with roll-moulding and nailheads. On the north side is a Norman corbel table carved with beasts' heads. The east window is Perpendicular and has three lights.

Inside, the chancel arch has two orders and a zigzag moulding. The font is Norman and in the form of a large drum. It has reliefs of the Last Supper, the Descent from the Cross, and Saint Nicholas or a bishop. There is also a 14th-century coffin slab, and several memorials. One of 1723, to Thomas Langley, is particularly elaborate, with a tablet flanked by Corinthian columns, resting on a shelf, with a scrolled pediment and achievement.

== See also ==
- Grade I listed buildings in North Yorkshire (district)
- Listed buildings in Birdsall, North Yorkshire
