= The Obelisk, Castle Howard =

Listed structure in North Yorkshire, England

The Obelisk
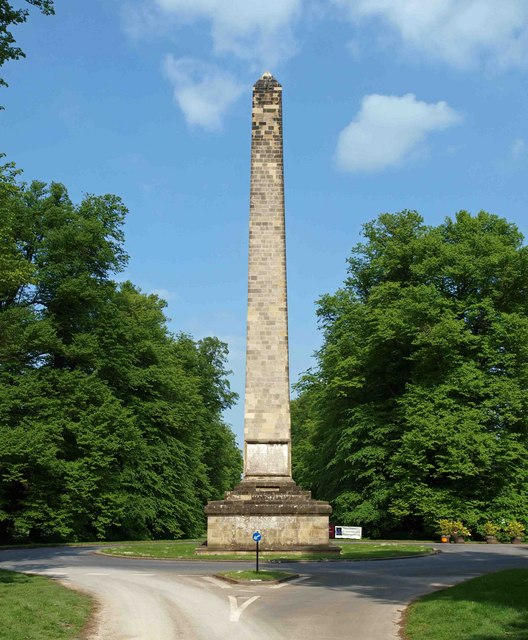
- The structure, in 2008

General information
- Address: Castle Howard, North Yorkshire, England
- Coordinates: 54.12056°N 0.91552°W
- Completed: 1714
- Renovated: 2004
- Height: 80 ft (24 m)

Design and construction
- Architect(s): John Vanbrugh
- Designations

Listed Building – Grade I
- Official name: The Obelisk
- Designated: 25 January 1954
- Reference no.: 1148980

The Obelisk is a historic structure at Castle Howard, in North Yorkshire, England.

The Ripon Obelisk, designed by Nicholas Hawksmoor and completed in 1702, was the first obelisk erected in England since antiquity. Hawksmoor later designed Castle Howard, assisted by John Vanbrugh, and Vanbrugh designed his second obelisk, for the site where the approach road makes a right-hand turn. The structure was completed in 1714, and is about 80 feet (24 m) tall. Vanbrugh later erected smaller obelisks elsewhere on the estate.

The obelisk was grade I listed in 1954. It was restored in 2004. It is built of stone and has a square plan. It stands on a massive square base with a pulvinated cornice, and on the east and west sides are inscriptions. The latter is now illegible, but it was a verse stating the intentions of Charles Howard, 3rd Earl of Carlisle, who commissioned the work on the estate:

If to perfection these plantations rise
If they agreeably my heirs surprise
This faithful pillar will their age declare
As long as time these characters shall spare
Here then with kind remembrance read his name
Who for posterity perform'd the same.

== Gallery ==
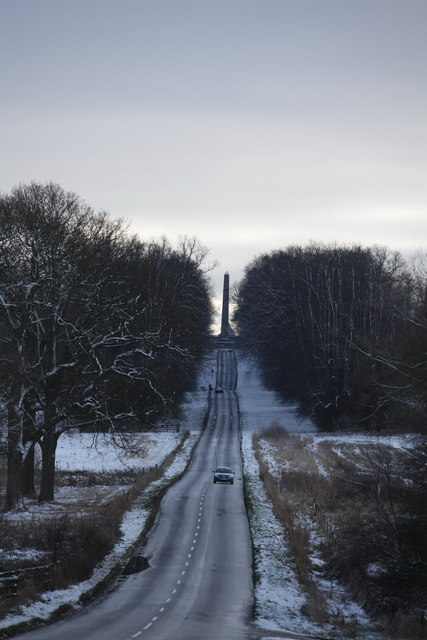
Long view from the north

== See also ==
- Grade I listed buildings in North Yorkshire (district)
- Listed buildings in Henderskelfe
