= All Saints' Church, Old Byland =

Church in Old Byland, North Yorkshire, England

Coordinates: 54°15′58″N 1°09′21″W

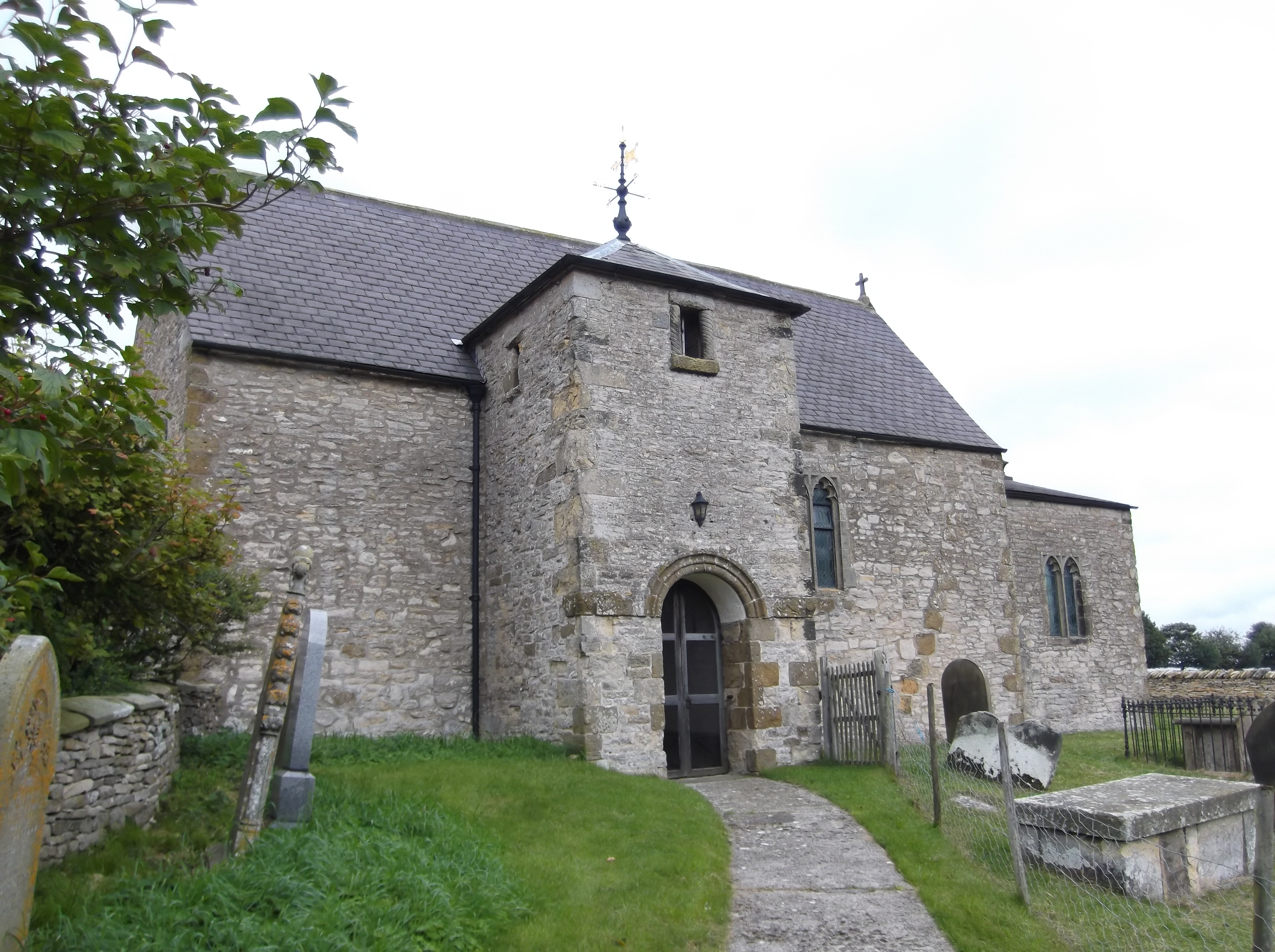
The church, in 2013

All Saints' Church is the parish church of Old Byland, a village in North Yorkshire in England.

The church was built in about 1100, from which period the nave and tower survive. The chancel was rebuilt and enlarged in the 15th century, and the roof was replaced. The whole church was restored in 1909, the work including the rebuilding of most of the chancel walls, the replacement of the west window, and the insertion of two new windows in the north wall. The dedication of the church had been forgotten, so on completion of the work, it was rededicated to All Saints. The church was grade I listed in 1955.

The church is built of limestone, with quoins, and a Welsh slate roof. It consists of a nave, a south porch-tower, and a chancel. The porch-tower contains a round-arched doorway with two orders of moulding, flanked by relocated early Norman capitals with carvings of dragons. On the east wall of the porch is an inscribed sundial. Inside, there is a Norman tub font, and the chancel has Mediaeval floor tiles in a circular pattern.

== See also ==
- Grade I listed buildings in North Yorkshire (district)
- Listed buildings in Old Byland and Scawton
