= Scawton =

Hamlet in North Yorkshire, England

Coordinates: 54°14′41″N 1°09′34″W

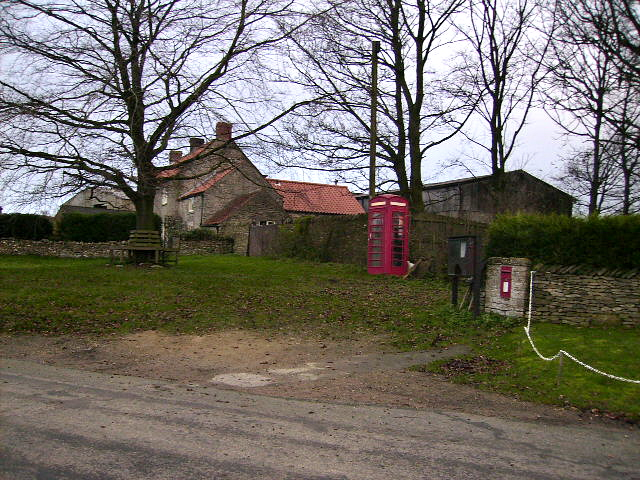
- The village centre in Scawton

- Location within North Yorkshire
- OS grid reference: SE548835
  - London: 193 mi (311 km)
- Civil parish: Old Byland and Scawton
- Unitary authority: North Yorkshire
- Ceremonial county: North Yorkshire
- Region: Yorkshire and the Humber
- Country: England
- Sovereign state: United Kingdom
- Post town: Thirsk
- Postcode district: YO7
- Dialling code: 01439
- Police: North Yorkshire
- Fire: North Yorkshire
- Ambulance: Yorkshire
- UK Parliament: Thirsk and Malton

Scawton is a village and former civil parish in North Yorkshire, England. The hamlet lies just east of Sutton Bank, north of the A170 road, and 5 miles (8 km) west of Helmsley, in the Hambleton Hills. The wider parish was the setting for the Battle of Old Byland, on Scawton Moor to the south. The road through the village used to link the two abbeys at Byland and Rievaulx, with the church, and possibly the village pub, being instigated by the monks for the use of travellers. In 1961 the parish had a population of 84.

== History ==
Scawton was listed in the Domesday Book as belonging to Count Robert of Mortain. The name was recorded as Scaltun in the Domesday Book, and has been written in documents as Scalton, Scaltona, Skalton and Scaulton, with Scawton first recorded in 1536. The name means farm in the hollow, where the word Skál means hollow. The soil was described as being poor, and sits on top of Kimmeridge clay. Further down, the land sits atop Hambleton Oolite, a white to grey fine ooidal limestone that was used for building houses and drystone walls in the area. Several old quarries dot the landscape in and around Scawton. Some of the purer limestone quarried on Scawton Moor was burnt to provide lime and mortar.

One former occupation of the villagers was operating bleachfields (open land for purify and whitening cloth by the action of sunlight) for a beetling mill in Crathorne. Bleachfields were common in the western Hambleton Hills in the late 18th century, with records of this activity being at Wass, Byland and Oldstead besides Scawton. The farm fields were used to dry out the cloth.

Originally in the wapentake of Ryedale in its own parish, the parish was merged with Old Byland on 1 April 1986 to form Old Byland and Scawton.

It was part of the Ryedale district from 1974 to 2023. It is now administered by North Yorkshire Council.

Scawton has a pub, The Hare, and the 12th-century St Mary's Church, Scawton. The church was built by the monks who later inhabited Byland Abbey and was renovated in 1892 by C. Hodgson Fowler. The structure is now grade I listed, and belongs to the ecclesiastical parish of Upper Ryedale. South of the village is a sawmill and woodworkers who use oak. There are no shopping amenities, and the hamlet has only a small number of properties, with some outlying farmsteads in the surrounding area. One of the few non-stone construction buildings in the hamlet is the village hall/reading room; this is made from corrugated green iron.

The road through the hamlet, known as Sperragate, links the A170 with the village of Old Byland and Rievaulx. This used to be the main route between Helmsley and Hambleton, before carrying on to Thirsk. The route is marked in Scawton with a wayside cross. The route was used by, and possible built for, the monks who used it to travel between the abbeys of Rievaulx and Byland. Besides building the church, the monks are thought to have built the pub for the use of travellers. The nearest railway station used to be in Coxwold, some 4 miles (6.4 km) to the south, but after the line closed, the nearest railway station is now in Thirsk.

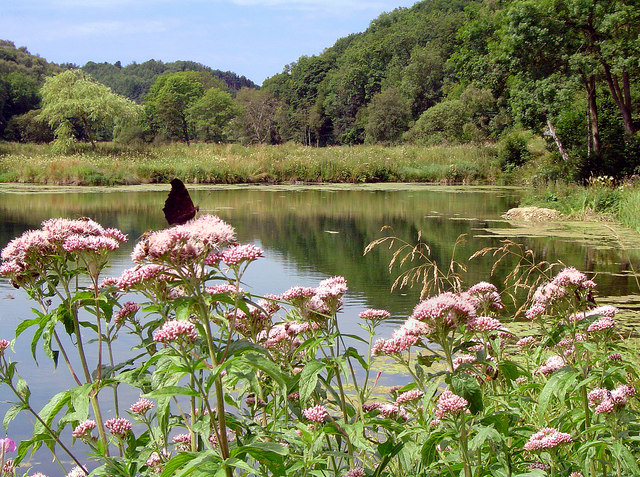
Nettle Dale ponds

In August 1981, a well-spoken caller, rang the police at Ripon to report a body on the road between Scawton and Rievaulx. The body was labelled as Nude in the Nettles (despite actually being found in willow herb), and is a long-running unidentified murder case.

To the north of the village are several small valleys, including Flassen Dale and Nettle Dale, all of which feed water into the River Rye at Rievaulx. Nettle Dale has several large ponds in the narrow valley which are believed to have been created as fishponds by the monks of Rievaulx. The long-distance footpath, the Cleveland Way, runs through Nettle Dale from Helmsley towards Cold Kirby and Sutton Bank.

== Scawton Moor ==
Within the parish, and south of the hamlet, lies Scawton Moor. An Iron Age burial mound was excavated here in the 1950s.

Scawton Moor was the actual location of the Battle of Old Byland, a 14th-century battle between the English, under Edward II, and the Scots under Robert the Bruce. The English were routed and Edward had to flee nearby Rievaulx, where he was staying, with haste.

In the 1960s, over 150 acres (60 hectares) of Scawton Moor was planted with conifer trees by the Forestry Commission.

== Notable people ==
- John Oxlee, rector at Scawton, 1816–1826
- Thomas Worsley, master of Downing College, Cambridge, was the rector at Scawton from 1828 until 1882.

== See also ==
- Listed buildings in Old Byland and Scawton
