= Lindrick with Studley Royal and Fountains =

Civil parish in North Yorkshire, England

Coordinates: 54.123°N 1.573°W

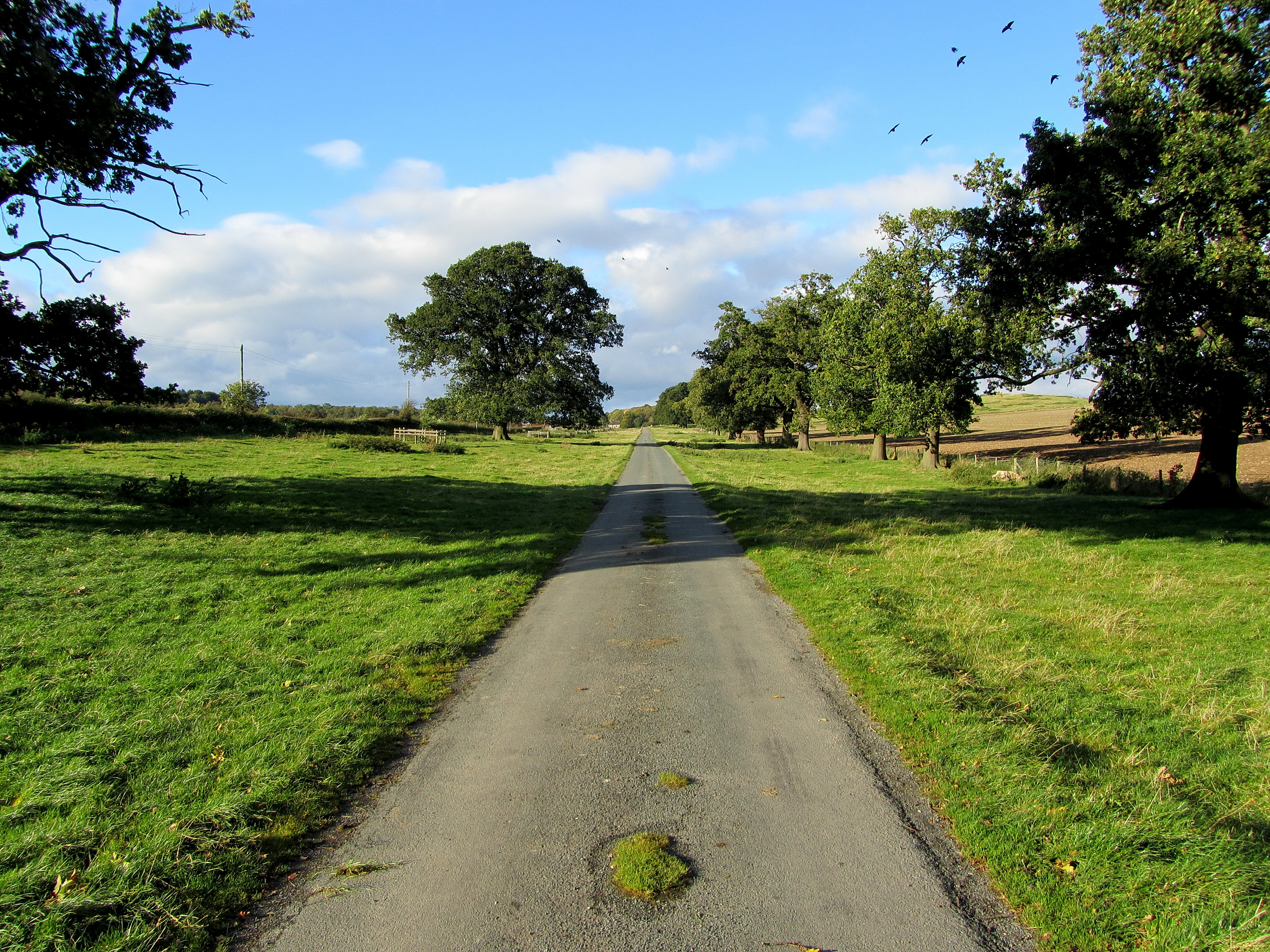
- Road from Studley Royal to Low Lindrick

- Location within North Yorkshire
- Population: 50 (2016 estimate)
- Unitary authority: North Yorkshire
- Ceremonial county: North Yorkshire
- Region: Yorkshire and the Humber
- Country: England
- Sovereign state: United Kingdom

Lindrick with Studley Royal and Fountains is a civil parish in North Yorkshire, England, 2 miles (3 km) west of Ripon. There is no village in the parish. The population of the parish was estimated at 50 in 2016.

The southern half of the civil parish comprises most of Studley Royal Park, an estate which since 1767 has included the ruins and estate of Fountains Abbey. The estate is now the property of the National Trust and is open to the public. The northern half of the parish includes the farming settlements of High Lindrick and Low Lindrick.

Lindrick and Studley Royal were historically extra-parochial areas in Claro Wapentake in the West Riding of Yorkshire. They became a civil parish in 1858. In 1974 the parish was transferred to the new county of North Yorkshire. From 1974 to 2023 it was part of the Borough of Harrogate, it is now administered by the unitary North Yorkshire Council.

The parish now shares a grouped parish council with the civil parishes of Studley Roger and Aldfield, known as Fountains Abbey Parish Council.

== See also ==
- Listed buildings in Lindrick with Studley Royal and Fountains
