= Priest's House, Barden =

Building in North Yorkshire, England

Coordinates: 54°00′38″N 1°55′24″W

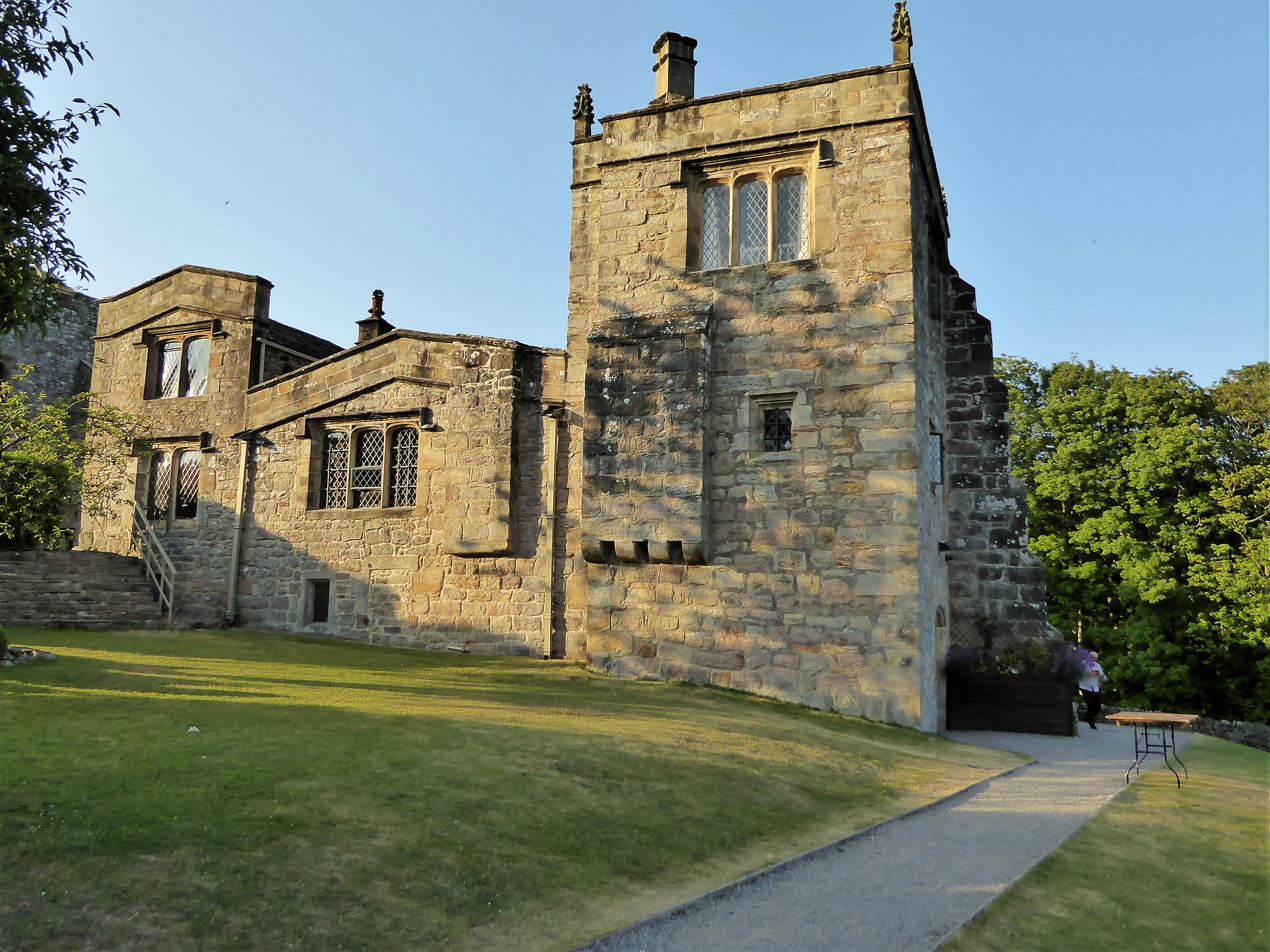
The building, in 2023

The Priest's House, formerly known as Barden Tower Farmhouse, is a historic building in Barden, Craven, a village near Skipton in North Yorkshire, in England.

The building was constructed in 1513, as a hunting lodge associated with neighbouring Barden Tower. It later served as a house for a worker at the tower, then as a farmhouse, before becoming a restaurant. It was Grade I listed in 1954.

The building is constructed of stone, with a stone slate roof. It is three bays wide, partly two storeys high, but the right-hand bay is a three-storey tower. The tower has a parapet, a crocketed pinnacle on the corners, and a large stepped buttress. The left two bays have parapeted gables. The windows have chamfered surrounds, and either a single light, or are mullioned with elliptical-headed lights. The doorway has a chamfered surround and an elliptical head.

== See also ==
- Grade I listed buildings in North Yorkshire (district)
- Listed buildings in Barden, Craven
