= Ripon Obelisk =

- Market Place Obelisk
- The Ripon Obelisk

General information
- Status: Preserved; public monument
- Type: Obelisk / Market cross
- Architectural style: English Baroque
- Location: Market Place, Ripon, North Yorkshire, HG4 1BN, England
- Coordinates: 54.136300°N 1.523730°W
- Grid position: SE3121671270
- Construction started: 1702
- Completed: 1702
- Client: John Aislabie

Height
- Height: 82 feet (25 m)

Technical details
- Structural system: Ashlar limestone column and pedestal

Design and construction
- Architect: Nicholas Hawksmoor

Listed Building – Grade I
- Designated: 27 May 1949
- Reference no.: 1315492

The Ripon Obelisk is an English Baroque obelisk located at the centre of the Market Place in Ripon, North Yorkshire, England. Designed by Nicholas Hawksmoor in 1702, the monument stands 82 feet (25 m) high and is recognized as the earliest surviving freestanding civic obelisk in the United Kingdom. Serving as the city's market cross, it was designated a Grade I listed building on 27 May 1949.

== History ==
=== Commission and construction (1702) ===
In the late 17th century, Ripon Market Place was dominated by an aging timber market cross. In 1702, John Aislabie, Member of Parliament for Ripon and owner of the nearby Studley Royal estate, commissioned a replacement monument as part of a major civic repaving scheme.

Aislabie engaged Nicholas Hawksmoor, then working alongside John Vanbrugh, to design a monumental civic structure. Constructed at a total cost of £564 11s 9d using limestone quarried from the Studley estate, the obelisk was designed to assert Ripon's civic prestige and reflect Classical antiquity. Writing in his 1724 travelogue, Daniel Defoe described the newly finished Market Place as "the finest and most beautiful square that is to be seen of its kind in England."

=== Restoration and inscription controversy (1781–1785) ===
By the late 18th century, the soft limestone masonry required repair. In 1781, William Aislabie—son of John Aislabie and MP for Ripon for sixty years—funded a comprehensive restoration of the column, capping it with a gilt weathervane.

In 1785, during the mayoralty of the Honourable Frederick Robinson, the Ripon Corporation installed a commemorative stone plaque on the pedestal base. The inscription reads:

MDCCLXXXI. ERECTED AT THE EXPENSE OF WILLIAM AISLABIE ESQUIRE, WHO REPRESENTED THIS BOROUGH IN PARLIAMENT SIXTY YEARS. THE MAYOR, ALDERMEN AND ASSISTANTS OF RIPON ORDERED THIS INSCRIPTION, MDCCLXXXV.

Local antiquarians have frequently noted that the wording is historically misleading, as it attributes the original erection of the monument to William Aislabie rather than his father John.

== Architecture and symbolism ==
The obelisk rises 82 feet (25 m) from a broad, square stepped base. The lower structure consists of a rusticated pedestal with moulded cornices and projecting plinths. The main shaft tapers upward in ashlar limestone to a pyramidal capstone.

=== Finial and weathervane ===
The top of the column features a bronze gilt finial incorporating key heraldic symbols of Ripon:

- A central fleur-de-lis.
- A model of the ceremonial Ripon Horn, representing the ancient civic office of the Wakeman.
- A spur rowel, commemorating Ripon's historic craft industry in steel spur-making.

== Civic traditions ==
The obelisk forms the central focal point for the ceremonial setting of the watch by the Ripon Hornblower. Every evening at 9:00 pm, a hornblower dressed in traditional livery sounds a charter horn at the four corners of the obelisk's pedestal, a unbroken civic ritual dating back to the 9th century.

== See also ==
- Grade I listed buildings in North Yorkshire (district)
- Listed buildings in Ripon
