= Horselydown =

Horselydown is the name of:

- Horselydown, an area of Shad Thames in London
- Southwark St John Horsleydown, a former parish in London
- St John Horsleydown, a former church in London
