= John James (architect) =

British architect (c. 1673–1746)

- Born: c.1673 possibly Basingstoke, England
- Died: 15 May 1746; Greenwich, London, England
- Occupation: Architect
- Buildings: Appuldurcombe House; St. George's Hanover Square

John James (c. 1673 – 15 May 1746) was a British architect particularly associated with Twickenham in west London, where he rebuilt St Mary's Church and also built a house for James Johnson, Secretary of State for Scotland, later Orleans House and since demolished. Howard Colvin's assessment of him was that of "a competent architect, but he lacked inventive fancy, and his buildings are for the most part plain and unadventurous in design".

== Life ==
The son of a Hampshire parson also named John James, he attended the Holy Ghost School, Basingstoke, of which his father was headmaster. He was then apprenticed in 1690 to Matthew Banckes, Master Carpenter to the Crown 1683–1706, whose niece he married, and he lived for a while at Hampton Court Palace. He was employed at Greenwich, where in 1718 he became joint Clerk of the Works with Hawksmoor, whom he succeeded as Surveyor of the Fabric of Westminster Abbey, where he completed Hawksmoor's west tower. In the interim he was appointed master carpenter at St. Paul's Cathedral, where he assisted Sir Christopher Wren and succeeded him in 1723 as Surveyor of the Fabric of St Paul's Cathedral. He was Master of the Carpenters' Company in 1734.

In 1714 he started work on St George's Church, Tiverton, which was finally completed in 1733.

In 1716 he replaced James Gibbs as one of the two surveyors to the Commissioners for the Building of Fifty New Churches – the other being Nicholas Hawksmoor. He designed one church for the commissioners – St George's, Hanover Square – and collaborated with Hawksmoor on the design of two others, St John Horsleydown in Southwark and St Luke Old Street. At St Alfege's Church in Greenwich, he recased the medieval tower and added a steeple in 1730, the rest of the church having been entirely rebuilt by Hawksmoor for the commissioners in 1712–14. James also designed St. Mary's Church, Rotherhithe in 1714–15 and St Lawrence, Whitchurch near Edgware around the same time. He also re-clad the medieval tower of St Margaret's, Westminster 1735–37 in a 'papery gothick manner' (VCH Middlesex Vol.XIII City of Westminster Part 1 P.144).

He was the professional on site for the construction of East India House, Leadenhall Street, London, to designs by the merchant and amateur architect Theodore Jacobsen, 1726–29.

Among several buildings in and around Twickenham, John James designed St. Mary's Church after it collapsed in 1713 (with the exception of its surviving west tower).

Also in south-east London, James designed Wricklemarsh, "a pioneer Palladian mansion" (Colvin) and in fact his only Palladian-style structure, for Sir Gregory Page in 1723. He was also probably the architect for the building now known as Ranger's House, Blackheath, London (c.1722–23).

The house he designed for himself around 1725 – Warbrook in Eversley, Hampshire – is one of the few surviving houses built by an eighteenth-century architect for his own use. He may also have designed Hursley House, Hursley, Hampshire, for (later, Sir) William Heathcote, and Barnsley House in Gloucestershire is now usually attributed to him, c. 1720.

== Writings ==
He published a pamphlet (1736) in the pamphlet war over the design of Westminster Bridge, for which he had submitted a design, which, though not accepted by the Commissioners, was accounted "clearly and well described". Competent in Latin, French and Italian, he translated Andrea Pozzo's treatise on perspective as Rules and Examples of Perspective, proper for Painters and Architects (1707, 2nd edition c. 1725) and from the French of Claude Perrault, A Treatise of the Five Orders of Columns in Architecture (1708), and from the French of Dezallier d'Argenville, The Theory and Practice of Gardening (1712, 2nd edition 1728, 3rd edition 1743. Thus John James can be seen as one of the intermediaries who made Baroque Continental practice in architecture, decorative painting and formal garden planning available to English patrons and craftsmen.

== Gallery of architectural work ==
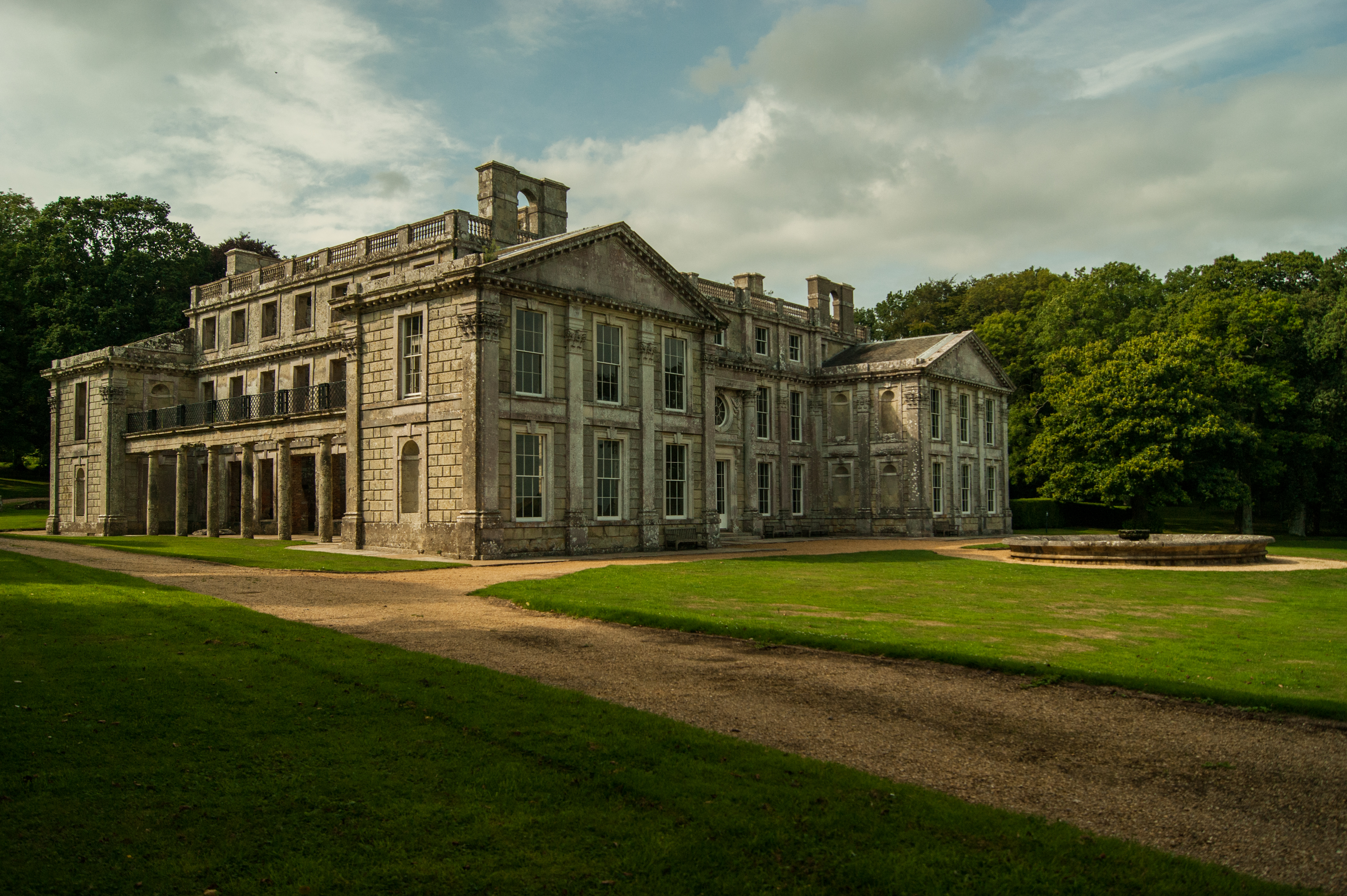
Appuldurcombe House, Isle of Wight

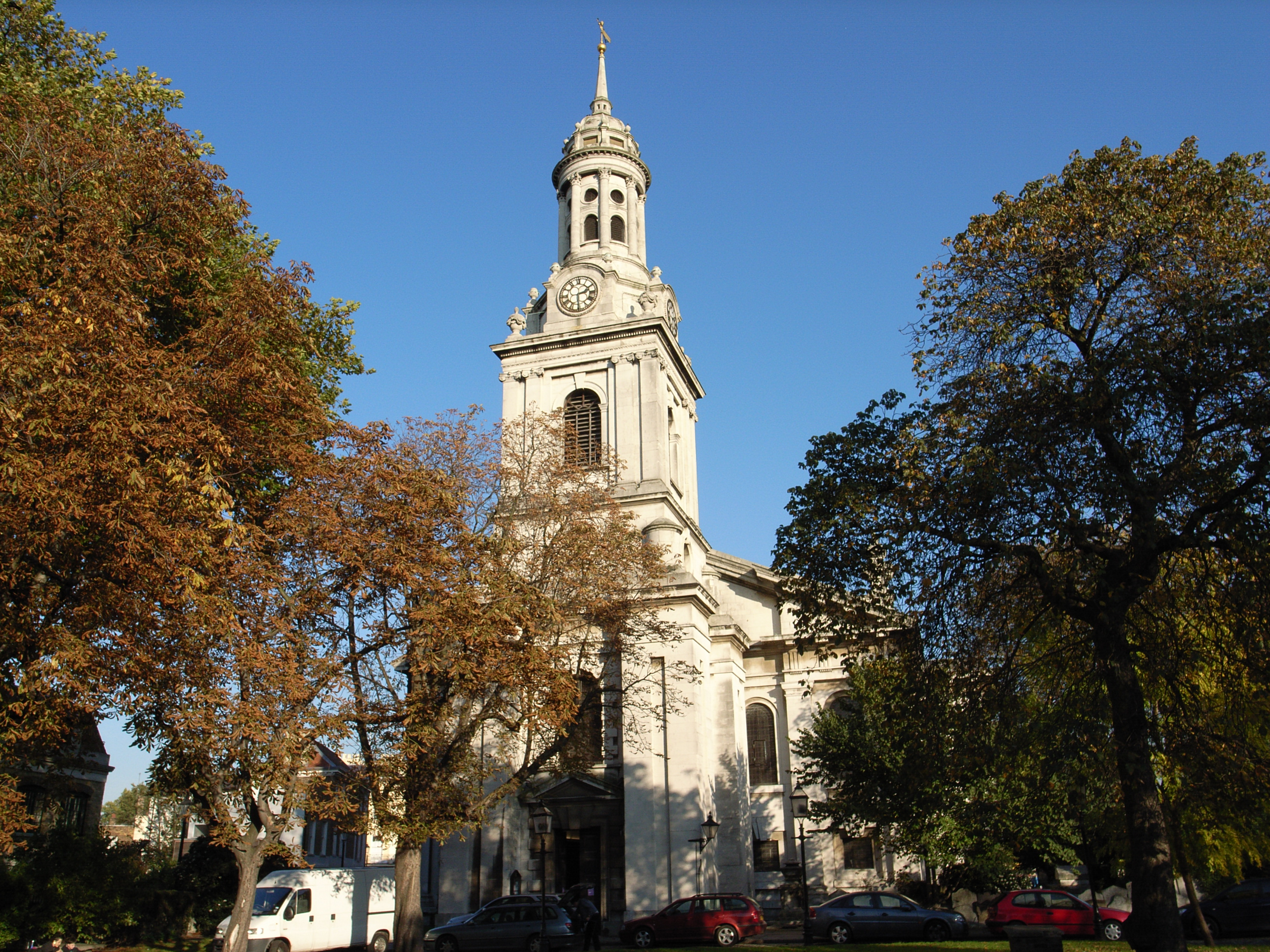
St. Alphege's Greenwich, upper part of tower by James

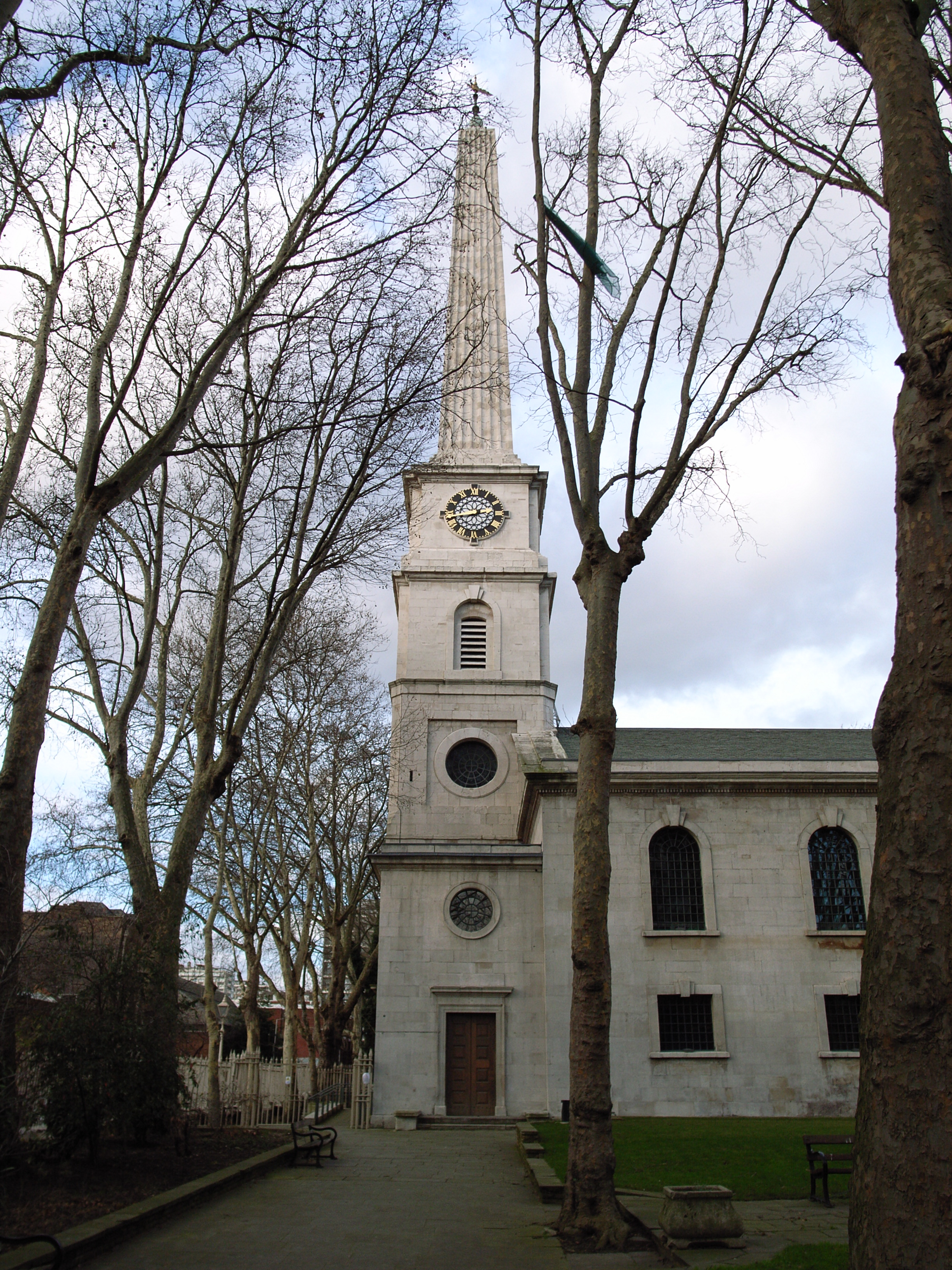
St. Luke's Old Street, London, with Nicholas Hawksmoor

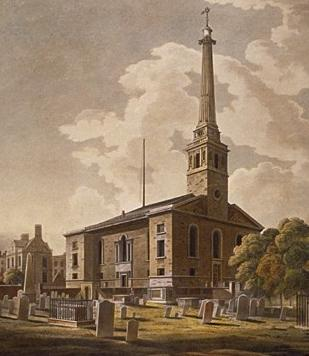
St. John's Horsleydown, London, with Nicholas Hawksmoor, bombed in London Blitz and demolished

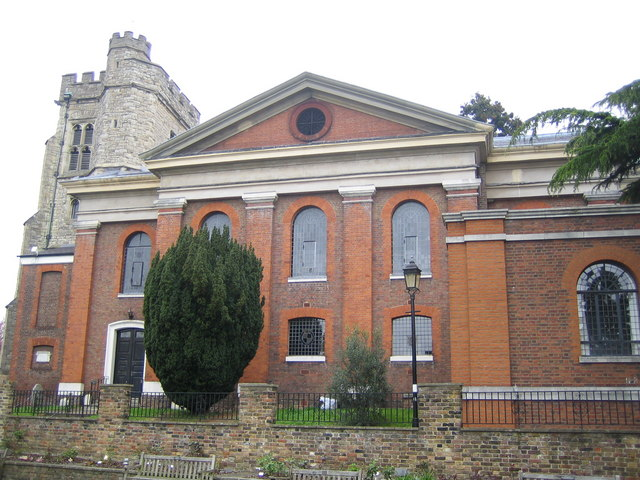
St. Mary's Church, Twickenham, rebuilt by James apart from the medieval tower

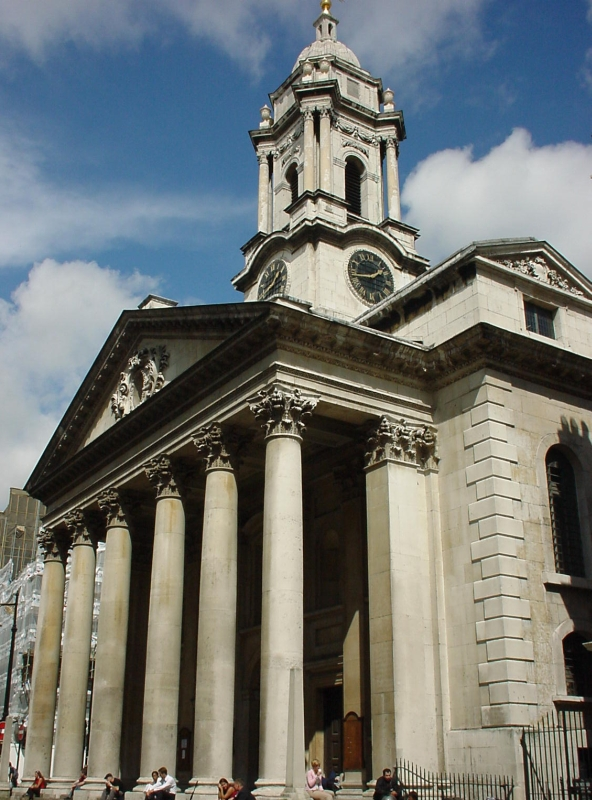
St George's, Hanover Square, London

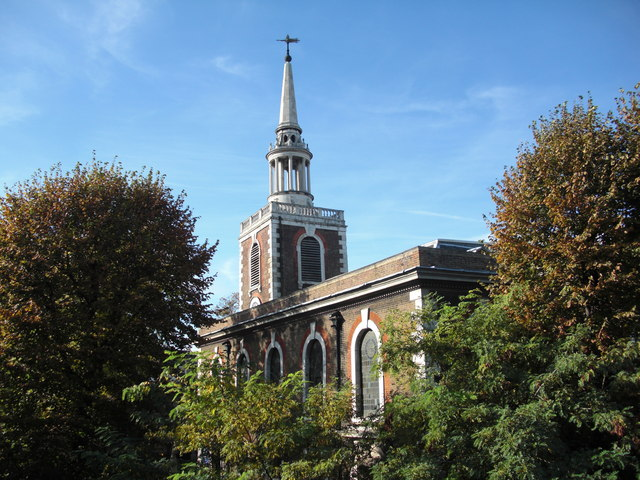
St. Mary's Rotherhithe, London

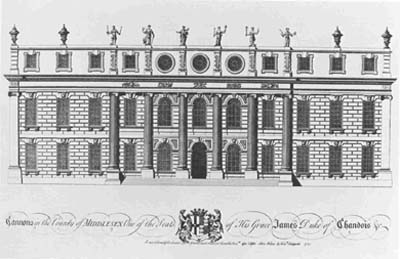
Cannons House, Middlesex, one of many architects involved in the house's design
