= Commission for Building Fifty New Churches =

English legislation

The Commission for Building Fifty New Churches (in London and the surroundings) was an organisation set up in England in 1711, by the New Churches in London and Westminster Act 1710 (9 Ann. c. 17), with the purpose of implementing the act by building fifty new churches for the rapidly growing conurbation of London. It did not achieve its target, but did build a number of churches, which would become known as the Queen Anne Churches.

== Churches built ==
Most of the churches were designed by Nicholas Hawksmoor, with John James, Thomas Archer and James Gibbs also participating.

- Christ Church, Spitalfields, Hawksmoor 1714–29
- St Alfege Church, Greenwich, Hawksmoor 1712–18 (rebuilding of an existing church)
- St Anne's Limehouse, Hawksmoor 1714–30
- St George's, Bloomsbury, Hawksmoor 1716–31
- St George in the East, Hawksmoor 1714–29
- St George's, Hanover Square, James 1720–25
- St John Horsleydown, Hawksmoor and James 1727–33
- St John's, Smith Square, Archer 1713–28
- St Luke Old Street, Hawksmoor and James 1727–33
- St Mary le Strand, Gibbs 1714–23
- St Mary Woolnoth, Hawksmoor 1716–24 (rebuilding of an existing church)
- St Paul's, Deptford, Archer 1713–30

The Commission partly funded rebuilding of five churches: St George Gravesend, St George the Martyr Southwark, St Giles in the Fields, St Mary Magdalen Woolwich and St Michael, Cornhill. It bought and altered St George the Martyr Holborn and bought St John Clerkenwell.

== Funding ==
The commission was funded by a duty on coal coming into London. This tax was originally levied in 1670 to pay for the rebuilding of St Paul's Cathedral and City churches destroyed in the Great Fire of London. When the commission was set up the duty was assigned to it. By the National Debt (No. 2) Act 1718 (5 Geo. 1. c. 9) the duty became part of general government revenues but a portion of it was still used to fund the commissioners' work.
