= St John Horsleydown =

Coordinates: 51°30′7″N 0°4′42″W

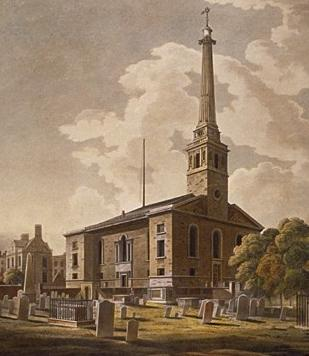
Engraving of St John Horsleydown by John Buckler

St John Horsleydown was the Anglican parish church of Horsleydown in Bermondsey, South London. Built for the Commission for Building Fifty New Churches to the designs of Nicholas Hawksmoor and John James in 1726–1733, it was noted for its distinctive spire in the form of a tapering column.

== The church ==
The church built between June 1727 and 1733 in Fair Street (beside the road now known as Tower Bridge Road, just south of the junction with Tooley Street), as one of the last churches built for the Commission for Building Fifty New Churches. The new parish was created from part of that of Southwark St Olave.

The design was by Nicholas Hawksmoor and John James, the two surveyors to the commission. In May 1727 they had been asked to draw up plans for a church costing, including its enclosure and parsonage, no more than £10,000, much less than Hawksmoor's previous churches.

Like St Luke Old Street, the other collaboration between the two men, which was built at the same time, the main body of the church was simple in plan, with an aisled nave. The most distinctive feature of the church was its unusual spire, This was in the form of a tapering column, and was topped by a weather vane depicting a comet. The "silly but lovable spire" was considered a landmark of south London by Nikolaus Pevsner. He described the church as "a stately building, all stone faced, the W front severely bare, without a portico, the N side symmetrical with two outer slightly projecting bays and a central big Venetian window." The church had a peal of ten bells cast in 1783/4.

== War damage and reduction to chapel of ease ==
Parts of the church remained in use after it was severely damaged by a bomb on 20 September 1940 during the Blitz. In 1952 only the west, north and east walls were standing. In 1947 the parish was merged with neighbouring St Olave's, (the church there having been demolished) so that the parish and church became known as Southwark, St Olave and St John. In 1956 there was a further amalgamation with the parish of St Magdalen Bermondsey, with the church becoming a chapel of ease in the new parish of Bermondsey St Mary Magdalen with St Olave and St John. In the same year a rebuilding scheme for the church was approved, but never carried out. The last baptism was held in the church in 1960. In 1964 a further amalgamation of parishes saw St Olave and St John's included in the parish of St Mary Magdalen with St Olave, St John and St Luke, Bermondsey.

== Closure and demolition ==
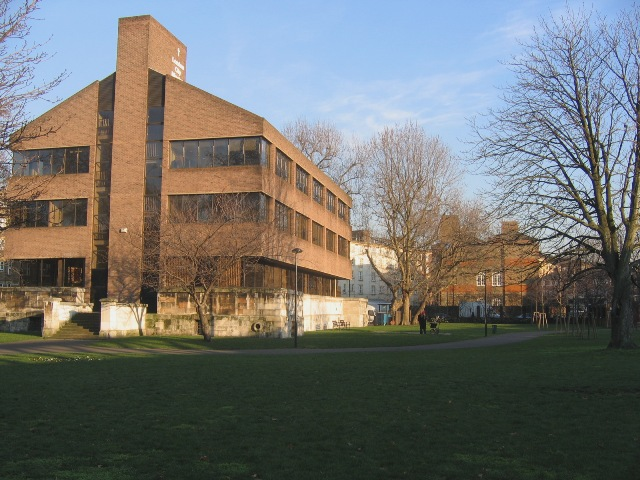
London City Mission, built on the footings of the old church

In 1968 the church was closed, and the 1956 rebuilding scheme rescinded. The London City Mission bought the site from the Church Commissioners in 1974 for £37,811. Burials in the church's crypt were removed to Brookwood Cemetery and the Mission opened its Nasmith House there in 1975, though the church's plinth may still be seen from the churchyard (surviving up to 10 ft in places). The shell of the church serves as the backdrop for part of the promo film for Manfred Mann's 1969 single 'Ragamuffin Man'.
