= East Hall =

East Hall may refer to:

- East Hall, Middleton Tyas, historic building in North Yorkshire, England
- East Hall (Ocala, Florida), listed on the National Register of Historic Places in Marion County, Florida
- East Hall (Tufts University), a historic academic building on the grounds of Tufts University, in Medford, Massachusetts
- East Hall (Kalamazoo, Michigan), listed on the National Register of Historic Places in Kalamazoo County, Michigan
- East Hall (Institute, West Virginia), listed on the National Register of Historic Places in Kanawha County, West Virginia
