= Listed buildings in Middleton Tyas =

Middleton Tyas is a civil parish in the county of North Yorkshire, England. It contains 38 listed buildings that are recorded in the National Heritage List for England. Of these, one is listed at Grade I, the highest of the three grades, two are at Grade II*, the middle grade, and the others are at Grade II, the lowest grade. The parish contains the village of Middleton Tyas and the surrounding countryside. Most of the listed buildings are houses, cottages and associated structures, and farmhouses. The rest include a church, items in the churchyard, a well, a milestone, and two limekilns.

== Key ==
Grade	Criteria
I	Buildings of exceptional interest, sometimes considered to be internationally important
II*	Particularly important buildings of more than special interest
II	Buildings of national importance and special interest

== Buildings ==
Name and location	Photograph	Date	Notes	Grade
St Michael's Church and grave cover 54.44497°N 1.63891°W		12th century	The church has been altered and extended through the centuries, including a restoration in 1867–69 by George Gilbert Scott. It is built in stone with an artificial stone slate roof, and consists of a nave, north and south aisles, a south porch, a chancel with a north vestry, and a west tower. The tower has four stages, a southeast stair turret, a two-light west window, light vents, two-light bell openings, and a parapet on corbels. At the east end of the south aisle is a half-lunette window with two mullions. Between the north door and a buttress is a grave cover propped up vertically.	I
Ledger stone 54.44496°N 1.63913°W	—	16th century (probable)	The ledger stone is in the churchyard of St Michael's Church, to the west of the tower. It is in gritstone, about 2.5 metres (8 ft 2 in) long and 1 metre (3 ft 3 in) wide. The stone has matrices for brasses in the form of two figures with scrolls.	II
Kneeton Hall and outbuilding 54.45686°N 1.67197°W		Late 16th century	The farmhouse and outbuilding are in stone with a pantile roof, shaped kneelers and stone coping. The farmhouse has two storeys and attics, a main range of five bays, a rear wing, and a cross-wing on the left. On the right of the main block are quoins, and in the centre is a doorway with a moulded architrave, a fanlight, a pulvinated frieze and a cornice, and the windows are sashes in architraves. The cross-wing contains two mullioned windows and one mullioned and transomed window, and there are more mullioned windows at the rear and in the rear wing. To the right is a lower outbuilding with two storeys, containing a coach house doorway with a quoined surround and a segmental-pointed arch, a doorway in an architrave, and shuttered openings with chamfered surrounds in the upper floor.	II
Inglenook House and The Cottage; 54.44659°N 1.65281°W	—	17th century	A house, later divided into two, in stone, with a pantile roof, a shaped kneeler and stone coping on the left and a raised verge on the right. There are two storeys and four bay. In the centre of the left three bays is a gabled porch, in the right bay is a doorway, and in both parts the windows are horizontally-sliding sashes. In the left return are single-light chamfered windows.	II
Village Farmhouse; 54.44612°N 1.65441°W	—	Mid 17th century	A farmhouse, later a private house, in stone, with quoins, and a pantile roof with stone slates at the eaves, shaped kneelers and stone copings. There are two storeys and four bays. The doorway is recessed, and has a moulded quoined surround, a triangular head and a hood mould, and above it is a blocked oculus with keystones. The windows are casements, one with a mullion and a hood mould.	II
Middleton House and cottage 54.44593°N 1.65375°W	—	Late 17th century	The cottage is the older, the house dating from the mid-18th century. Both parts are in stone, the house is rendered, and with pantile roofs, the house with stone slates at the eaves, and have two storeys. The house has three bays, and a central doorway with a fanlight. The cottage has two bays, and both parts have sash windows.	II
West Hall; 54.44683°N 1.65124°W	—	c. 1705	The house was extended to the right in about 1805 and further to the right in 1905. It is in stone with some brick, partly roughcast, with a pantile roof, shaped kneelers and stone coping. There are two storeys, partly with attics, and a T-shaped plan with a rear wing. The original part has five bays, and contains a central doorway with a radial fanlight and a shell hood on brackets, above which is an inscribed sundial with a moulded surround. The middle part has two bays, and the right part is roughcast with three bays. It has brick stepped eaves and two roof dormers. The other windows in all parts are sashes.	II
East Hall; 54.44879°N 1.64976°W	—	1713	A large house in stone, with quoins, and a stone slate roof with stone copings and shaped kneelers with volutes. There are two storeys and attics, seven bays, a single-storey addition to the right, and a rear outshut and rear wing. In the centre is a caned bay window, the other windows are sashes, and in the attic are dormers. In the left return is a porch, and at the rear are cross windows.	II*
Gate piers in front of West Hall; 54.44679°N 1.65119°W	—	Early 18th century	The gate piers at the entrance to the garden are in stone, with a cross plan and banded rustication. Each pier has a plain base and a corniced capital.	II
Gazebo southeast of East Hall; 54.44834°N 1.64891°W	—	Early 18th century	The gazebo is in stone, and has a hipped pantile roof with an urn finial. There are two storeys and one cell. In the ground floor, a doorway leads into the lower chamber, and external steps lead up to a similar doorway to the upper room. In the upper floor, the left return has a seven-pane window.	II
The Hill; 54.44573°N 1.65443°W	—	Early 18th century	Two stone houses with quoins, dentilled and stepped eaves, and a pantile roof with raised verges. There are two storeys and three bays. On the front are two doorways and a blocked doorway with a quoined surround. The windows are a mix of casements and horizontally-sliding sashes.	II
Woodhouse; 54.45919°N 1.64204°W	—	Early 18th century	A farmhouse divided into two flats, it is in brick on a stone plinth, with stepped eaves, and a pantile roof, hipped on the right. There are two storeys, and an L-shaped plan, with a front range of three bays, and a rear wing on the left. On the front is a flat-roofed porch, and the windows are sashes.	II
Chest tomb of Leonard Spence; 54.44491°N 1.63904°W		c. 1738	The chest tomb is in the churchyard of St Michael's Church, to the south of the tower. It is in sandstone, and consists of a chest with panelled sides. Inserted into the top slab is an inscribed bronze plaque.	II
Foresters Hall; 54.44681°N 1.64988°W	—	Mid 18th century	The house is in stone with a pantile roof and two storeys, The central block has two bays, brick stepped eaves, and a roof with shaped kneelers and stone copings. In the centre is a doorway with a pediment, and the windows are sashes. The block is flanked by single-bay pavilions with hipped roofs and they contain sash windows.	II
Forge Cottage; 54.44585°N 1.65401°W	—	Mid 18th century	The cottage is in roughcast stone and has a pantile roof. There are two storeys and two bays. On the front is a doorway with a casement window to the left, and the other windows are horizontally-sliding sashes.	II
Galsworthy House and outbuilding 54.44605°N 1.65317°W	—	Mid 18th century	The house and outbuilding are in stone, with pantile roofs, stone coping on the left and a raised verge on the right. The house has quoins, two storeys and three bays. In the centre is an open porch and a doorway with a fanlight. This is flanked by canted bay windows, and in the upper floor are sash windows. The lower outbuilding to the right has a small shuttered opening in each floor.	II
Tumbling Well; 54.44839°N 1.64693°W		18th century	The well has a stone surround, and contains a stone spout with an ogee head discharging into a trough. The surround has a round arch, and on the rear wall is an inscribed marble slab with a biblical text in a chamfered frame. On the upper surface is slab coping.	II
Hope House; 54.44778°N 1.65009°W	—	Mid to late 18th century	The house, at one time a public house, is in stone with rusticated chamfered quoins, a cornice, and a pantile roof with shaped kneelers and stone coping. There are two storeys and three bays. The central doorway has a keystone, and the windows are sashes.	II
Sundial Cottage and Rose Cottage; 54.44671°N 1.65227°W	—	Mid to late 18th century	A pair of stone cottages with quoins to the left, and a pantile roof with stone coping on the left. There are two storeys and each cottage has two bays. The left cottage has a central doorway with a stone surround, and above it is a sundial in a lozenge-shaped plaque. The right cottage has a doorway in a segmental-arched surround with imposts. In both cottages, the windows are sashes.	II
Violet Grange; 54.44740°N 1.67535°W	—	Mid to late 18th century	The farmhouse is in stone, with quoins, brick stepped eaves, and a roof of pantile with lower courses of stone slates, and artificial stone slate, with raised verges and kneelers. There are two storeys, four bays and a rear outshut. The doorway has a stone surround, and above it is a small window. The other windows are horizontally-sliding sashes with keystones.	II
Garden walls north of East Hall; 54.44916°N 1.65008°W	—	Late 18th century (probable)	The walls enclosing the former kitchen garden are in cobble, lined with orange-red brick, and have flat coping. They are about 3 metres (9.8 ft) high, forming a U-shaped plan, and have occasional pilaster buttresses. In the centre of the north wall is a round-arched doorway with pilasters, set in a brick panel, and in the west side is a gateway with a chamfered lintel and quoins.	II
Group of three chest tombs 54.44491°N 1.63865°W	—	Late 18th century	The chest tombs are in the churchyard of St Michael's Church, to the south of the chancel, and are in sandstone. The tomb nearest to the church has an inscription, the middle one has a carved skull and crossbones and an hourglass, and the other one has a carved cherub.	II
Group of six Hartley chest tombs 54.44491°N 1.63908°W	—	Late 18th century	The chest tombs are in the churchyard of St Michael's Church, to the south and west of the tower. They are in sandstone, and commemorate members of the Hartley family. Two of them are decorated with acanthus rosettes, flanked by fluted pilasters on the ends, and the others are plain.	II
Kitchen garden walls west of Middleton Lodge; 54.45609°N 1.65968°W	—	Late 18th century (probable)	The walls enclosing the kitchen garden are in red-brown brick. They form a square plan, on three sides they are about 4 metres (13 ft) high with slab coping, and the southeast wall is lower. The northwest wall is heated, and on the outer side are a bothy, a boiler house and potting sheds. In the northwest wall is a blocked segmental-arched opening containing a round-headed doorway with imposts, and two round-arched windows, and there are round-arched doorways elsewhere.	II
Milestone; 54.44683°N 1.65034°W		Late 18th century	The milestone outside Foresters Hall is in stone, and has a triangular plan. On the left side is inscribed "Catterick Bridge 3", and on the right side "Greata Bridge 9".	II
Pair of chest tombs 54.44503°N 1.63868°W	—	Late 18th century	The chest tombs are in the churchyard of St Michael's Church, to the north of the church, and are in sandstone. Both tombs have oval inscribed panels flanked by pilasters, and fluted pilasters on the ends. In addition, the outer tomb has urns and festoons, and the inner tomb has circular panels with acanthus rosettes.	II
Middleton Lodge; 54.45609°N 1.65648°W		1777–80	A country house designed by John Carr, It is in sandstone, and has a hipped Westmorland slate roof. There are two storeys and five bays, the middle three bays projecting, and a three-storey five-bay service range to the left. The house has a plinth, a floor band and a sill band, a modillion cornice, and over the middle threes bays is a pediment with a cartouche in the tympanum. In the centre is a distyle Roman Doric portico with a fluted frieze, a dentilled cornice with mutules, and a pediment. The windows are sashes in architraves, those in the ground floor with dentilled cornices, and in the upper floor with balustraded aprons.	II*
Entrance gateway, Middleton Lodge; 54.45414°N 1.66039°W		c. 1780 (probable)	The gateway was designed by John Carr. The entrance to the drive is flanked by convex quadrant stone walls on a plinth, with moulded coping and cylindrical end bollards, and between them are low cross walls with wrought iron railings. The gates and railings have fleurs-de-lys finials, the standards have knob finials, and the gates have a guilloché motif.	II
Gateway on south drive to Middleton Lodge; 54.45503°N 1.65854°W	—	c. 1780 (probable)	The gateway was designed by John Carr. Flanking the gates are low stone walls with wrought iron railings. The gates and railings have fleurs-de-lys finials, the standards have knob finials, and the gates have a guilloché motif.	II
Stable block, Middleton Lodge; 54.45646°N 1.65859°W		c. 1780	The stable block containing stables, coach houses and hayloft was designed by John Carr. It is in sandstone and has hipped Westmorland slate roofs. The buildings form three ranges around a courtyard. The main range has nine bays, the middle three bays with two storeys, containing semicircular arches with voussoirs and imposts. The middle arch is a carriageway, and the outer bays contain round-headed windows. Above them are three oculi and a cornice. The outer wings have one storey and contain round-headed arches. At the rear is a mounting block. The side ranges have two storeys, and each contains a three-bay stable and a two-bay coach house. The windows are sashes.	II
Appletree Cottage, Arch Cottage, Archway Cottage and The Neuk; 54.44647°N 1.65324°W	—	Late 18th to early 19th century	A terrace of four cottages in stone, with quoins, and a hipped pantile roof. There are two storeys and six bays. In the ground floor are doorways, a porch, a doorway in a former round-arched passageway, and casement windows. The upper floor contains a mix of casement and horizontally-sliding sash windows.	II
Brewery north of East Hall; 54.44884°N 1.64998°W	—	Late 18th to early 19th century	The brewery, later used for other purposes, is in stone with quoins and a hipped stone slate roof. There is a single storey with a basement on the right, and two bays. In the centre is a doorway with a quoined surround, and the windows are sashes, all with keystones. Under the right window is a shuttered coal chute, and in the right return is a doorway with a chamfered surround.	II
Galsworthy Cottage; 54.44616°N 1.65298°W	—	Late 18th to early 19th century	The cottage is in stone, with quoins, and a pantile roof with shaped kneelers and stone coping. There are two storeys, a double depth plan, and two bays. In the centre is a gabled porch and a doorway with a pediment, and the windows are casements.	II
Longfield Farmhouse; 54.44599°N 1.65348°W	—	Late 18th to early 19th century	The house, at one time a public house, is in stone, with quoins, and a pantile roof with stone copings. There are two storeys and three bays. On the front is a doorway, and the windows are a mix of sashes and casements.	II
Orchard House; 54.44620°N 1.65274°W	—	Late 18th to early 19th century	The house is in whitewashed stone, and has a Welsh slate roof with stone copings. There are two storeys and three bays. The central doorway has a fanlight, and the windows are horizontally-sliding sashes under flat brick arches.	II
Coach house, East Hall; 54.44856°N 1.65034°W	—	Early 19th century	The coach house, later used for other purposes, is in stone, with quoins, and a hipped pantile roof with stone slates at the eaves. There are two storeys and two bays. The ground floor contains doors in segmental-arched brick surrounds, and in the upper floor are casement windows.	II
Limekilns in Black Scar Quarry; 54.44211°N 1.64478°W	—	Mid 19th century	The limekilns are in stone and brick. There are two segmental-arched openings with a quoined surround, and two hearths with a triangular plan. Above each hearth is a small circular hole covered by a slab. Above the kilns is a flat walkway, and the remains of a brick superstructure.	II
Limekilns northwest of Kneeton Hall; 54.45772°N 1.67394°W	—	Mid 19th century	The limekilns are in stone and brick. There are two segmental-arched openings, and two hearths with a triangular plan. On the top is a circular hole.	II
