= Gatherley Castle =

Castle in North Yorkshire, England

Coordinates: 54.41070°N 1.66016°W

Gatherley Castle, sometimes referred to as a modern mansion, was located in the township of Middleton Tyas, North Yorkshire, England.

== History ==
It is not known when the castle was built or who designed it. The design of the sash-windows and hoodmoulds suggest a design of around 1830-1840, although an archway had the date 1885 emblazoned across it.

Henry de Burgh-Lawson (1817–1892) owned it in the 1870s. Mr Coatsworth, of Darlington, occupied it after 1892. In 1900, the castle was bought by Miss Barningham (1860–1915), daughter of a Darlington Ironmaster, William Barningham. There is a mention in an 1889 directory. After her death, it was unoccupied and the furniture was sold in 1928.

The castle was requisitioned by the British Army during the Second World War (1939–45). During that time, it held German and Italian prisoners of war. It also housed a searchlight battery.

Edgar Lawson acquired the land and demolished the castle in 1963, but kept the family coat of arms which is on display in Coniscliffe Road in Darlington. It has the motto Latin: Leve et reluis (Arise and reillumine) which is the motto of the Lawson family who came from Northumberland.

The castle had two gates, North Lodge and South Lodge, both built in woodland alongside the Great North Road. Around 1963, the woodland was cleared and the road was widened to the dual-carriageway A1, the two lodges standing directly on the side of the road. Due to the A1 upgrade to motorway standard, the lodges had to be demolished in 2016, along with several other buildings.
