= Kneeton Hall =

Building in Middleton Tyas, North Yorkshire, England

Coordinates: 54°27′25″N 1°40′19″W

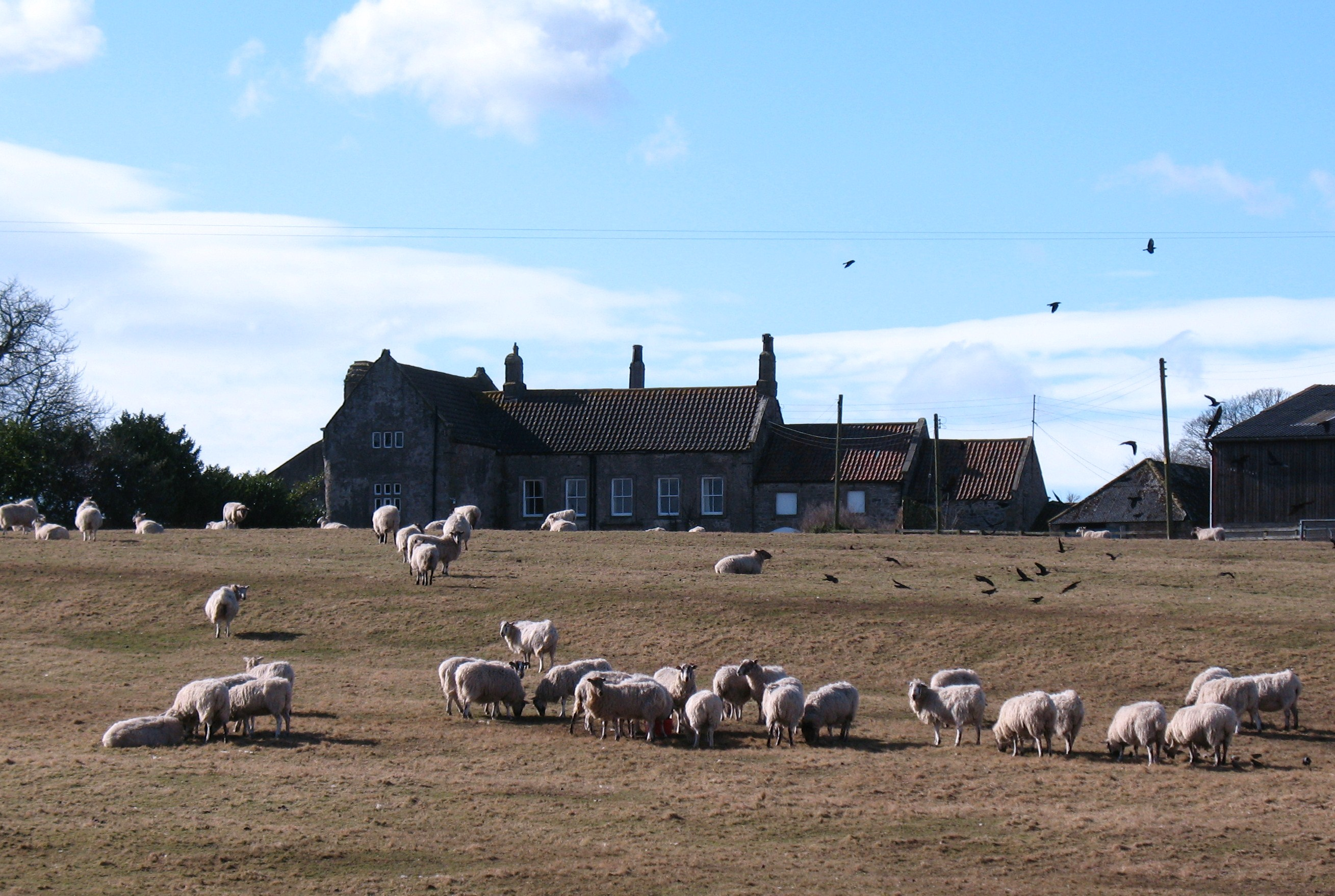
The building, in 2010

Kneeton Hall is a historic building in Middleton Tyas, a village in North Yorkshire, in England.

The house was probably constructed in 1597 and a south wing was added in 1616. It is believed that the house originally had a private chapel, of which foundations may survive. The building was altered in the late 18th century, from which period much of the interior dates. The building later became a farmhouse. In the 20th century the coach house was converted into a garage. The building was grade II listed in 1951, along with an attached outbuilding to the north.

The farmhouse and outbuilding are built of stone with a pantile roof, shaped kneelers and stone coping. The farmhouse has two storeys and attics, a main range of five bays, a rear wing, and a cross-wing on the left. On the right of the main block are quoins and in the centre is a doorway with a moulded architrave, a fanlight, a pulvinated frieze and a cornice, and the windows are sashes in architraves. The cross-wing contains two mullioned windows and one mullioned and transomed window, and there are more mullioned windows at the rear and in the rear wing. To the right is a lower outbuilding with two storeys containing a coach-house doorway with a quoined surround and a segmental-pointed arch, a doorway in an architrave and shuttered openings with chamfered surrounds in the upper floor. Inside there is an 18th-century staircase.

== See also ==
- Listed buildings in Middleton Tyas
