= St Michael and All Angels' Church, Middleton Tyas =

Church in North Yorkshire, England

Coordinates: 54°26′42″N 1°38′20″W

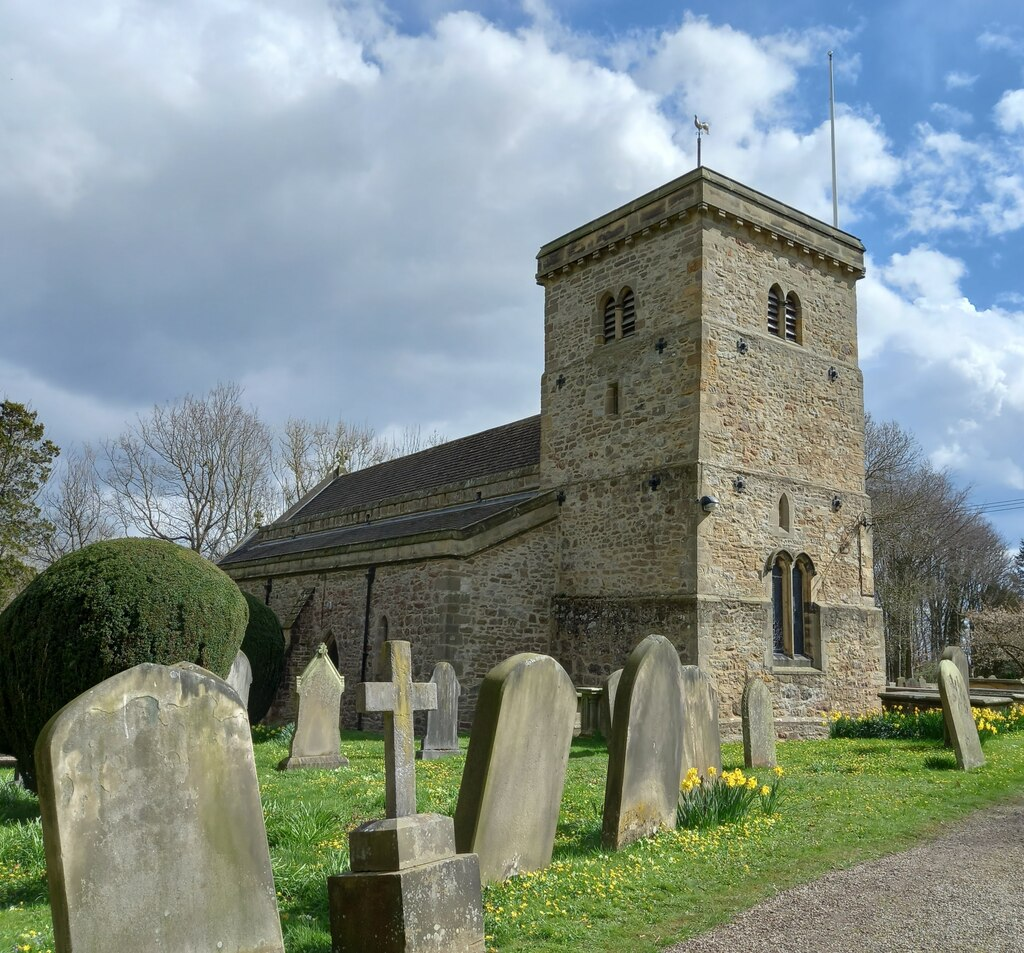
The church, in 2022

St Michael and All Angels' Church is the parish church of Middleton Tyas, a village in North Yorkshire, in England.

The oldest surviving part of the church is the north arcade of the nave, which was built about 1140, although it is believed that this was an addition to an earlier building, which was both widened and lengthened. In the 13th century the west tower was constructed, and the chancel and north wall of the nave were rebuilt. The south arcade of the nave was added in the 14th century. Between 1867 and 1869, the church was restored by George Gilbert Scott, the work including the reconstruction of the chancel, heightening of the chancel arch, addition of a north vestry, a south porch and a spire, and the rebuilding of many of the windows. The church was grade I listed in 1969.

The church is built of stone with an artificial stone slate roof, and consists of a nave, north and south aisles, a south porch, a chancel with a north vestry, and a west tower. The tower has four stages, a southeast stair turret, a two-light west window, light vents, two-light bell openings, and a parapet on corbels. At the east end of the south aisle is a half-lunette window with two mullions. Between the north door and a buttress is a grave cover propped up vertically. Inside, the fittings date from 1868 or later, but there is a tomb and a coffin lid, both dating from about 1300, a piscina, a 15th-century alms box, a communion table dating from about 1700, and part of a Saxon cross head.

== See also ==
- Grade I listed buildings in North Yorkshire (district)
- Listed buildings in Middleton Tyas
