= Middleton Lodge =

Mansion in Middleton Tyas, North Yorkshire, England

Coordinates: 54.458°N 1.660°W

Middleton Lodge

Middleton Lodge is a Georgian Palladian mansion set within 200 acres (81 ha) of open countryside, on the outskirts of the village of Middleton Tyas, a mile or so off the A1 near Scotch Corner and a 15-minute drive from Darlington, County Durham.

Middleton Lodge was designed by the architect John Carr, and was built between 1777–1780 for George Hartley Esquire. In recent years, the estate has undergone a sensitive restoration program, with new additions including The Fig House, designed by Rebecca Tappin.

The Hartley family was one of the major land owning families in the area. George's father, Leonard Hartley, lived in East Hall, one of the larger houses in Middleton Tyas. The Hartleys continued to live in Middleton Lodge until the late 1870s. In 1890 The Hon. Mrs Margaret Dundas, widow of the Hon. John Charles Dundas, MP (1808–1866), is recorded as living there. She died in 1907. It was later the family home of coal owner Sir Arthur Pease, 1st Baronet, who died there in 1927.

Middleton Lodge is still a family home to the Allison family, who have lived there since 1980. From 2006, the Main House has been available for exclusive private hire. In 2014, James Allison owner and partner Rebecca Tappin, opened the Coach House as a Restaurant with Rooms. Since then, The Fig House, designed by creative director Rebecca Tappin in the Walled Garden has been added as an additional wedding venue alongside the 2.5 acre Walled Garden designed by landscape architect Tom Stuart-Smith. The Forest Spa, designed by Rebecca around the concept of forest bathing was added in 2023. Today the hotel comprises 2 restaurants, 2 wedding venues, 50 bedrooms across the orchard, potting sheds, dairy, and farmhouse, and a Spa and is renowned for its beautiful and sensitive renovation. In 2024, the hotel was awarded as the Top 10 Boutique hotel in the country. In 2025, the second restaurant, Forge, won a Michelin Star, to add to the Green Michelin Star awarded in 2024, and Young Chef of the Year award for head chef Jake Jones.

It was the filming location for the television film Perfect Day and the Hindu-language children's film Hari Puttar: A Comedy of Terrors.

== Hartley family ==
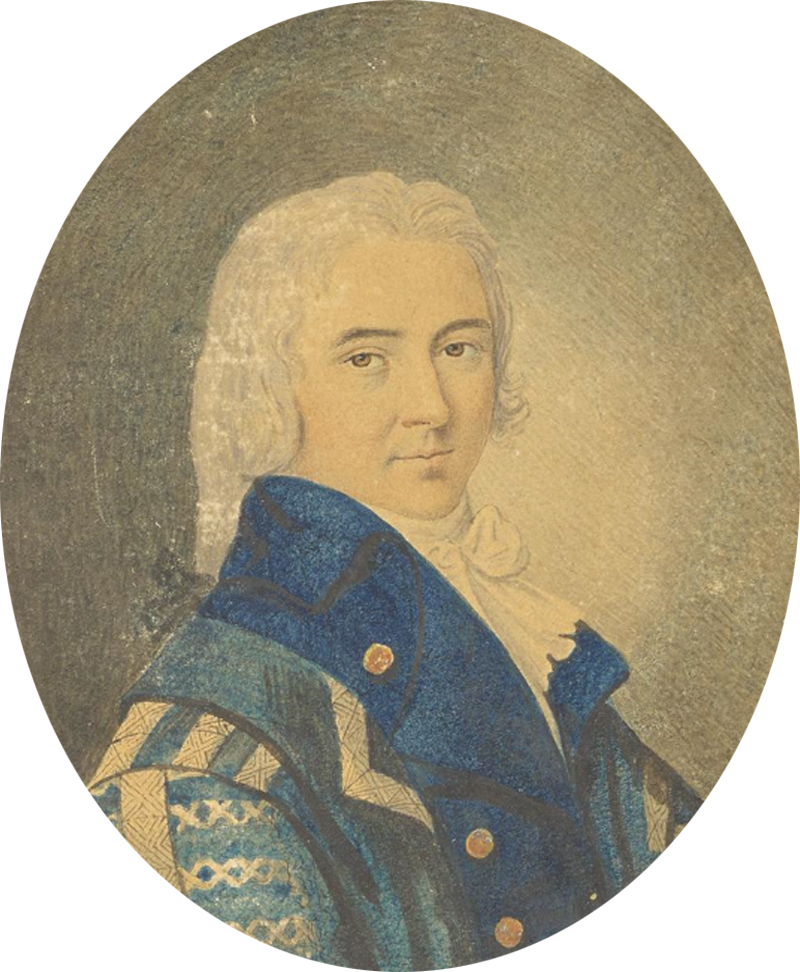
Leonard William Hartley

George Hartley (1726–1780) built Middleton Lodge in about 1777. He was born in 1726 in Middleton Tyas. His father was Leonard Hartley (1689–1774) who was a wealthy landowner and copper mine magnate. His mother was Catherine Bowles who unfortunately died at a young age when George was only three years old. He was brought up by his father at East Hall which is nearby. He went to Cambridge University and became a barrister.

In 1774 at the age of 48 George married a widow Mrs Ann Bunting, daughter of the Reverend William Tomlinson who was 34 years old. She already had two daughters, Elizabeth and Dorothy Bunting by her first marriage. Their son Leonard William Hartley was born in 1775. George died in 1780 when his son was only five years old and his property was held in Trust until Leonard came of age.

Leonard went to Cambridge University in 1793. At this time the University commissioned the notable artist Sylvester Harding to paint some of the students and Leonard was one of those chosen. The watercolour is shown.

Leonard died in 1815 and Middleton Lodge was passed to his second cousin Francis Hartley (1778–1820) who died five years later. It was then inherited by George Hartley (1780–1841) Francis’s younger brother. George also went to Cambridge University and became a barrister. He joined the North York Corps of Yeomanry Cavalry and was promoted to Major. George did not marry and the 1841 Census shows him living alone with nine servants. When he died in 1841 his property was inherited by his nephew Leonard Lawrie Campbell who changed his name to Hartley in honour of his uncle.

Leonard Lawrie Hartley (1816–1883) was the son of Archibald Campbell of Bedale Yorkshire who was a medical doctor. Leonard inherited his uncle’s fortune at the age of only 25 and was able to become a wealthy landed proprietor at a very early age. He lived for some time at Middleton Lodge but from about 1852 he rented it to Edmund Backhouse and his family for many years. After he died in 1883 the property was inherited by Elizabeth Martha Eyre who was a distant relative. She lived in West Hall in Middleton Tyas and continued to rent out Middleton Hall.

== Eyre family ==
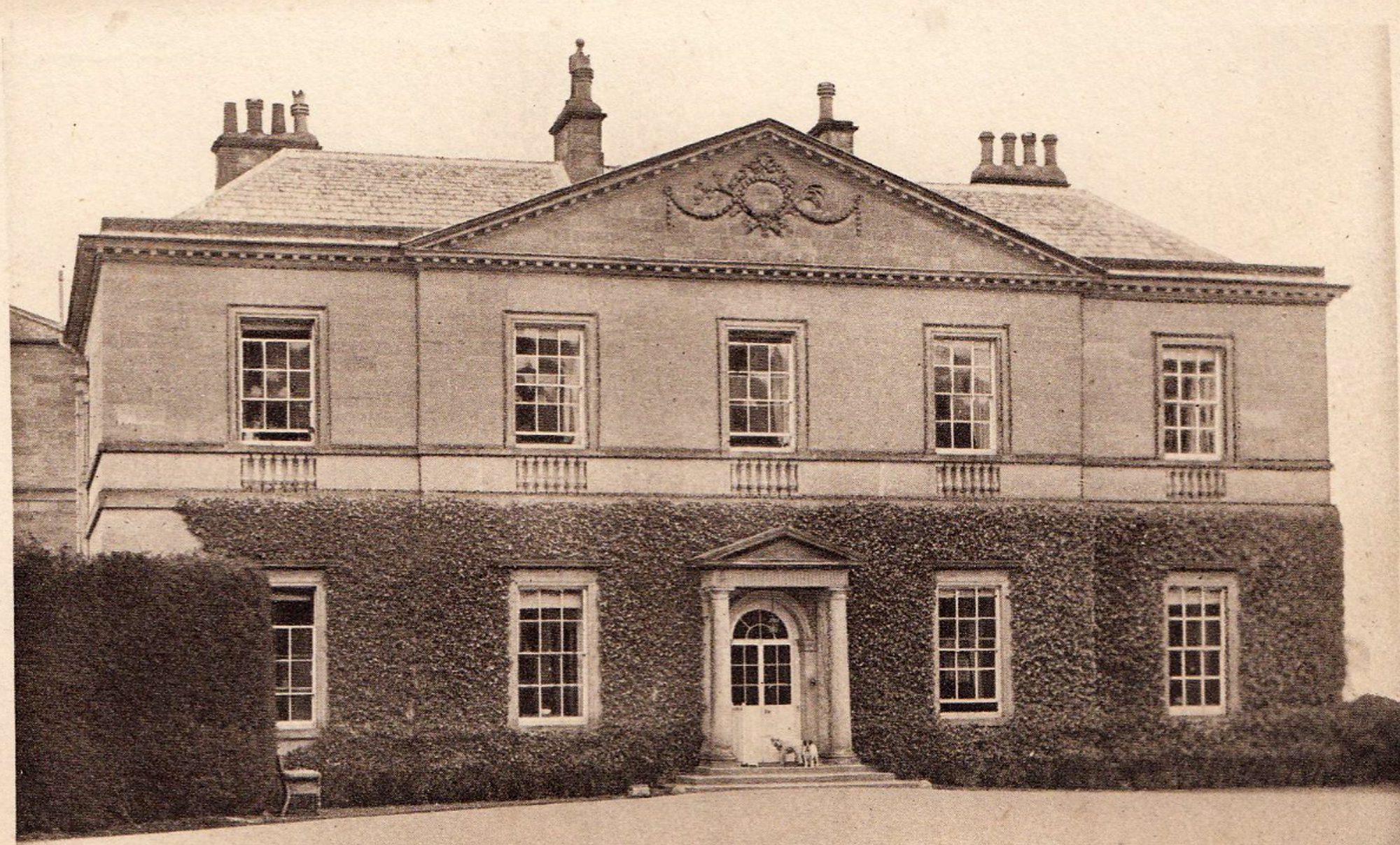
Middleton Lodge in about 1900 at the time it was owned by the Eyre family

The Eyre family did not live at Middleton Lodge but they appear to have owned it from 1883 until about 1947. Elizabeth Martha Eyre who inherited the property in 1883 was born Elizabeth Martha Allgood (1821–1892). Her father was Robert Lancelot Allgood of Nunwick Hall. In 1840 she married Henry Eyre (1805–1889) who became a General in the British Army.

When her relative Leonard Lawrie Hartley died in 1883 Elizabeth inherited his Middleton Tyas Estate including Middleton Lodge. She died in 1892 and her son Colonel Henry Robert Eyre inherited the house. When he died in 1904 it was inherited by his eldest son Lieutenant Colin Douglas Eyre of the Kings Royal Rifles. He was tragically killed in 1910 at the age of 30 when he was riding in the Cavalry Brigade Point to Point races and his horse fell. He had been married only 6 months before this accident and had no children so his property went to his younger brother Ralph Vincent Eyre. When Ralph died in 1940 he was unmarried and his estate was left to his cousin Isabella Mary Baker who married Michael Adrian Speir. The Speirs lived in Middleton Tyas for many years but they appear to have sold Middleton Lodge and other properties in about 1946. It was bought by the Ropner family. John Raymond Ropner purchased the property in about 1946 and lived there with his family until 1980. It was then bought by the Allison family who still own it today.

== Tenants of Middleton Lodge ==
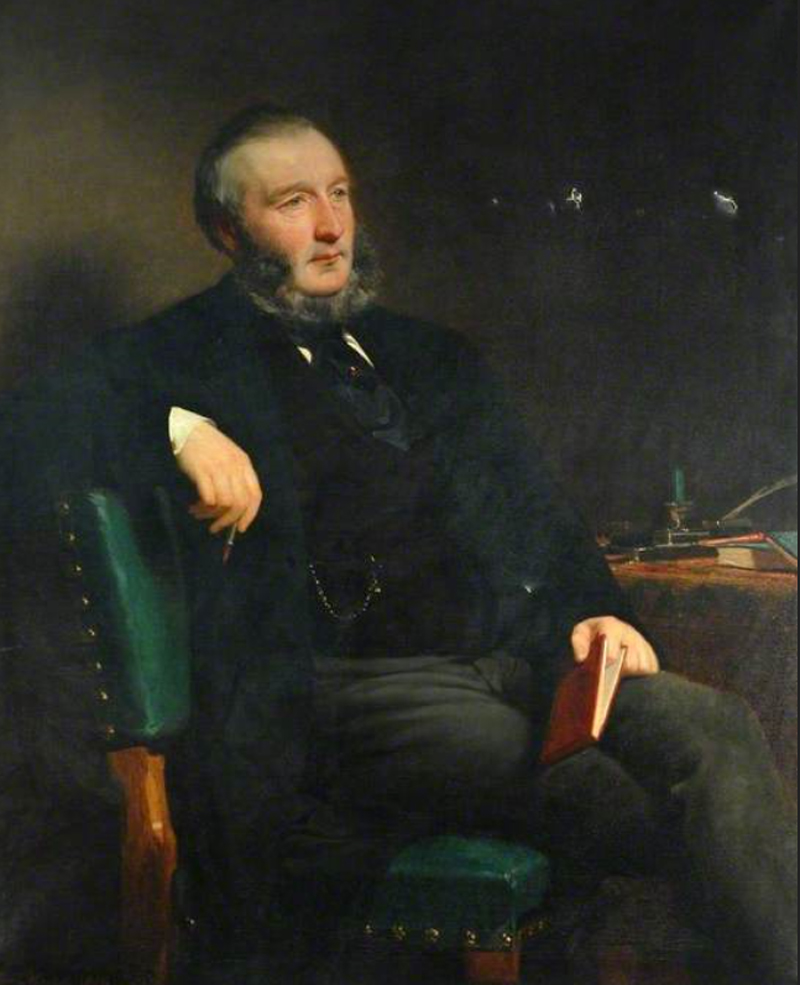
Edmund Backhouse (1824–1906)

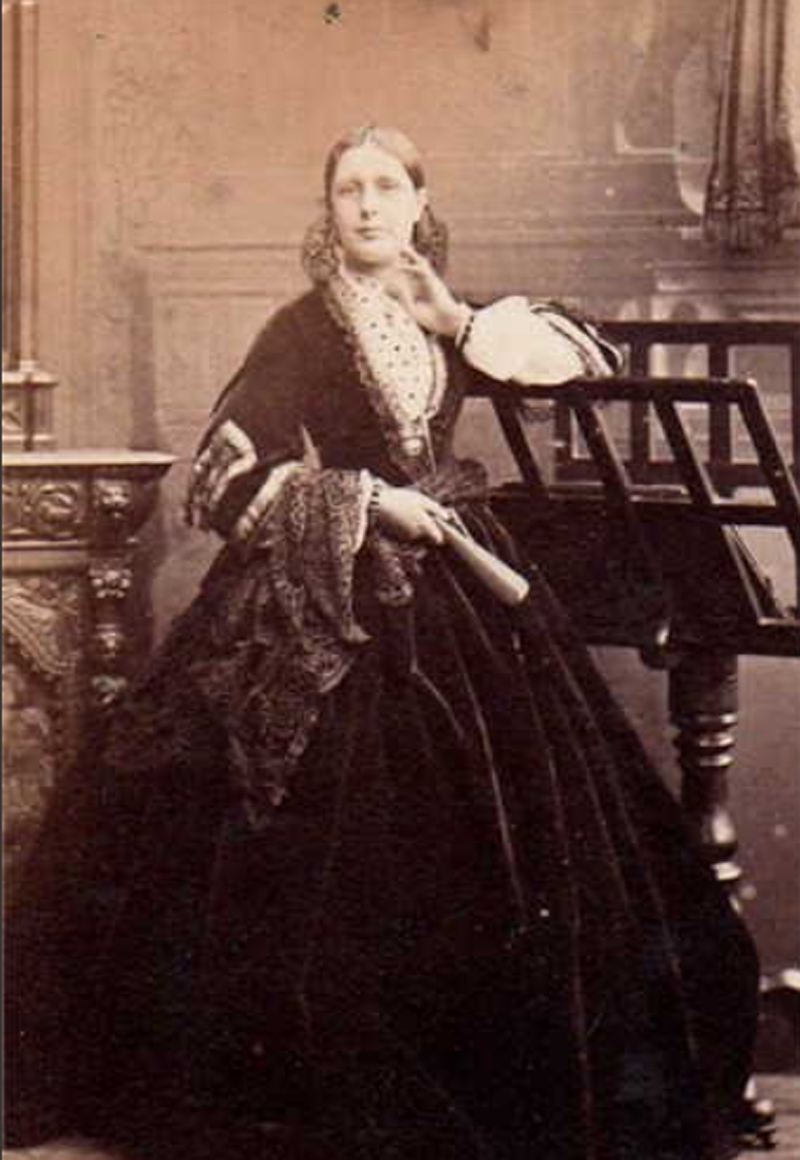
Juliet Mary Backhouse née Fox, wife of Edmund Backhouse

The Backhouse family rented the house from about 1852 until about 1883. Edmund Backhouse (1824–1906) was born in 1824 in Darlington in Durham. His father was Jonathan Backhouse, a leading banker in the family Banking firm of Backhouse and Co. which was later to become part of Barclays Bank. Edmund joined the family banking business and eventually became the Managing Director. He was also the Member of Parliament from 1868 until 1881.

In 1848 he married Juliet Mary Fox who was the daughter of Charles Fox who established the famous garden called Trebah at Falmouth, Cornwall. Charles Fox died in 1883 and Juliet inherited Trebah. The Backhouse family then moved to their Cornwall home and continued Charles’ work in planting the garden. They are both credited with extensive development of the grounds at Trebah, introducing rare trees and conifers, tree ferns, and hybrid rhododendrons over the next 29 years.

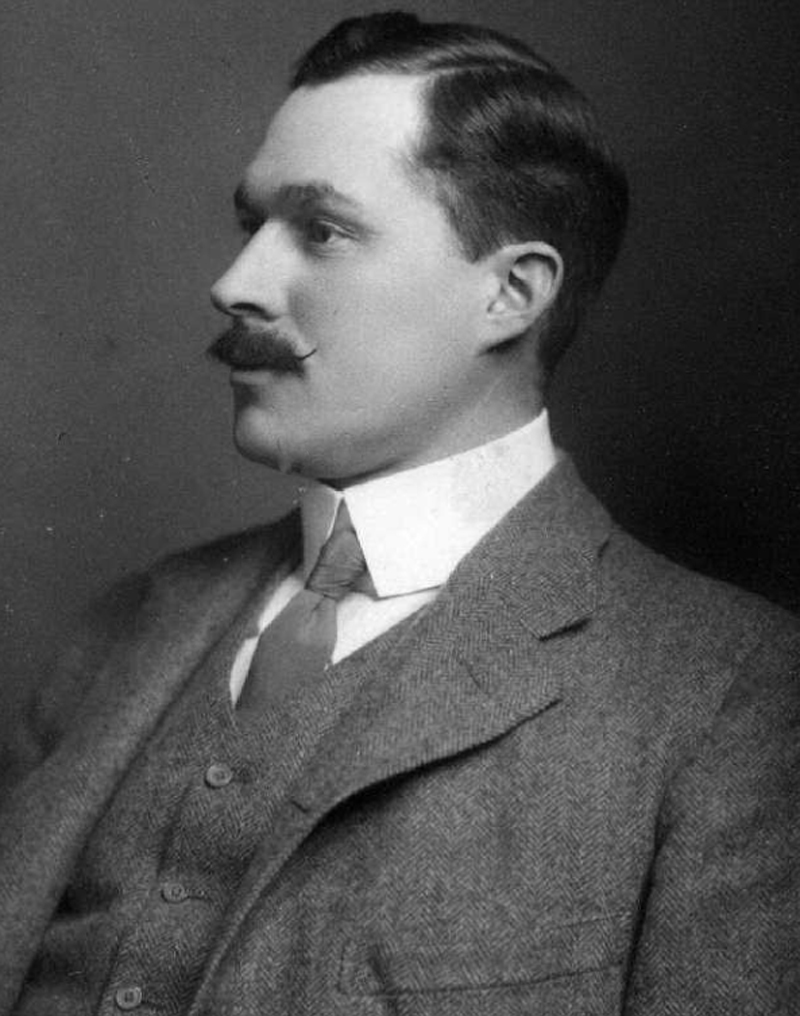
Sir Arthur Pease

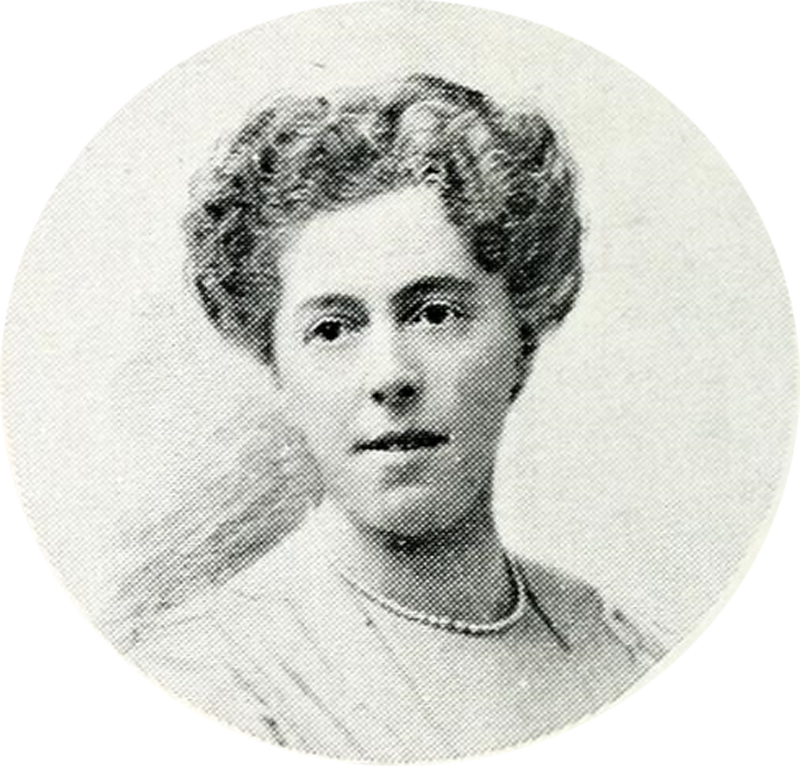
Lady Laura Pease, wife of Sir Arthur Pease

After the Backhouses left the house was rented by the Hon. Margaret Matilda Dundas (1826–1907). She was the widow of Hon. John Charles Dundas (1808–1866) of Wood Hall who had been a Member of Parliament. She liked to entertain and held frequent house parties and tennis tournaments.

After Mrs Dundas died in 1907 Middleton Lodge was rented by the Pease family until about 1936. Sir Arthur Francis Pease (1866–1927) was born in 1866 in Darlington. His father was Arthur Pease of Cliff House, Marske who was a Member of Parliament and also an owner of a large colliery firm.

Arthur went to Cambridge University and gained a MA degree in 1893. He joined the family coal and ironstone business called Pease and Partners Ltd and eventually became the Chairman and Managing Director.

In 1889 he married Laura Matilda Ethelwyn Allix, daughter of Charles Peter Allix, of Swaffham Prior House. The couple had four children. During the First World War, Arthur was appointed as Second Civil Lord of the Admiralty and he received his baronetcy in 1920. He was an alderman of the Durham County Council and Deputy Lord Lieutenant of the County.

He died in 1927 and his wife Lady Laura Pease continued to live at Middleton Lodge until her death in 1936. The house was then tenanted by the Baird family.

Major Sir James Hozier Gardiner Baird (1883–1966) 9th Baronet of Saughton who rented the house from about 1927 until 1946 was born in 1883. He was the son of Sir William James Gardiner Baird. He became Major in the 4th Battalion of Bedfordshire Regiment. He married in 1921 but his wife died in the following year. He remarried in 1923 Joan Violet Barker and several years later the couple came to live at Middleton Lodge. After he left in 1946 it was bought by the Ropner family (see above).

== See also ==
- Grade II* listed buildings in North Yorkshire (district)
- Listed buildings in Middleton Tyas
