= Beverley Assembly Rooms =

Building in Beverley, East Riding of Yorkshire, England

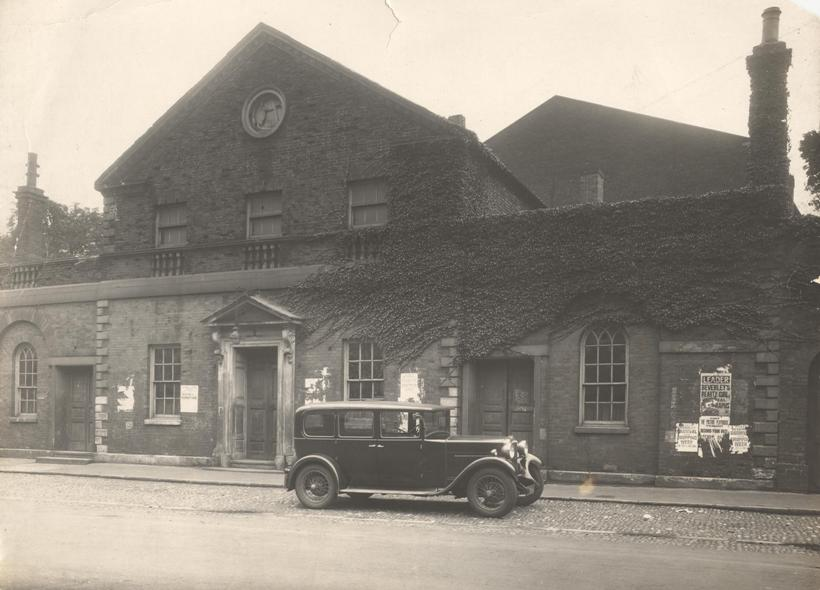
The building, around 1930

The Beverley Assembly Rooms was a historic building in Beverley, a town in the East Riding of Yorkshire.

Assemblies of wealthy residents and visitors were first recorded in Beverley in 1732, and by 1745, dedicated assembly rooms had been constructed on North Bar Without. In 1763, a new building was constructed on Norwood, to a design by John Carr. Their popularity gradually fell over time. Between 1840 and 1842, a large hall was constructed behind the rooms, to a design by H. F. Lockwood. The building was renamed the "Beverley and East Riding Public Rooms", and it was initially used by the Beverley and East Riding Agricultural Association and the Beverley and East Riding Floral and Horticultural Society, but soon by a wide variety of local groups. In 1909 and again in 1929, it was used as a roller rink.

In 1934, the older part of the building was demolished to make way for the Regal Cinema, which incorporated the existing rear hall. This was taken over by Associated British Cinemas in 1937, who operated it until 1968, when the building was converted into a bingo hall and snooker club. The rear hall was grade II listed in 1987, but the entire building was demolished in 1998, and replaced by a development named "Regal Court".

The building designed by Carr was two storeys high and had a symmetrical front, with a ballroom behind, which had single-storey wings either side. The extension was constructed of red brick, with one high storey and five bays, and contained Diocletian windows.
