= Joseph Halfpenny =

British draughtsman and engraver (1748–1811)

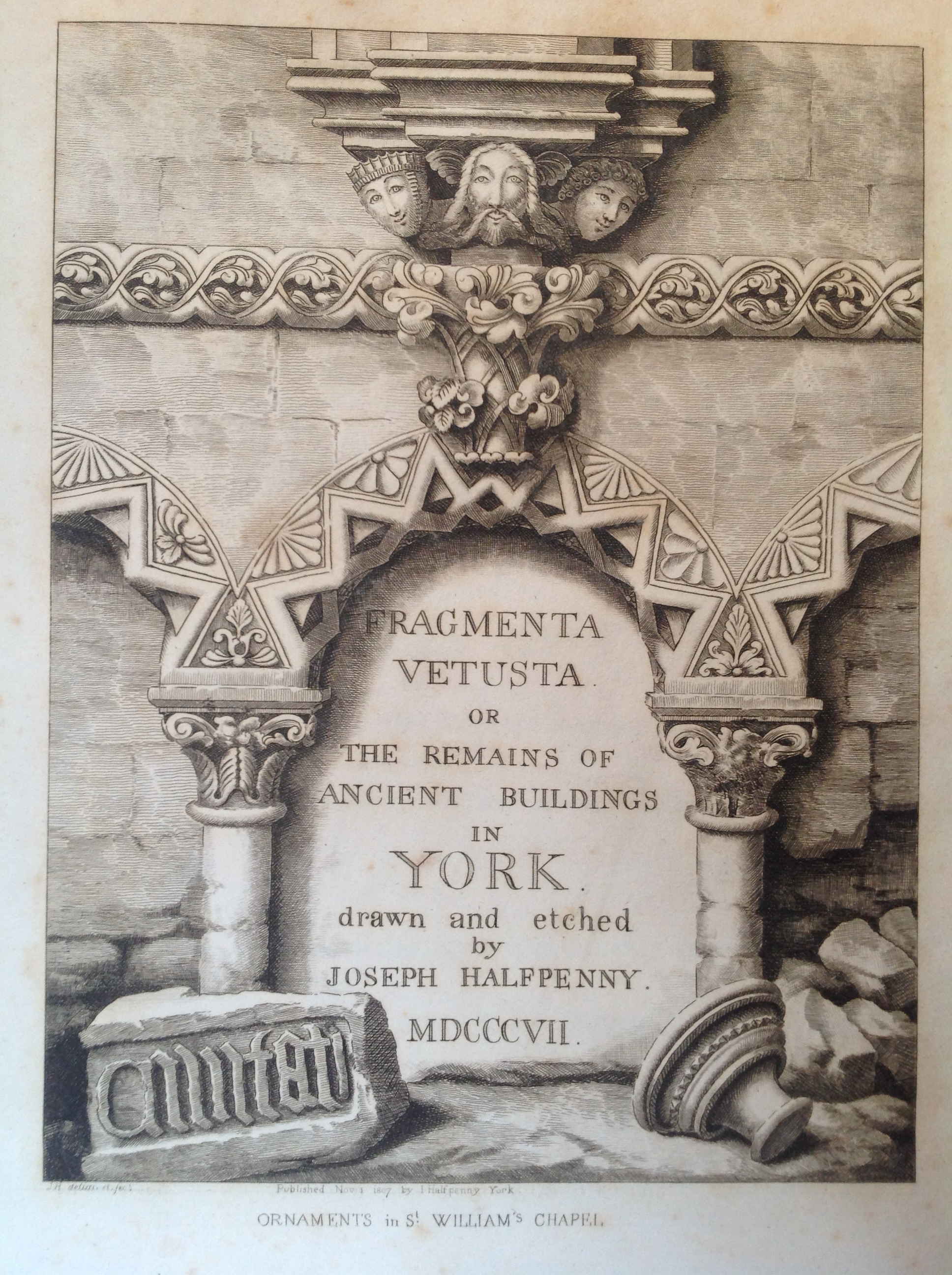
- Frontispiece: "Fragmenta Vetusta or The Remains of Ancient Buildings in York" drawn and etched by Joseph Halfpenny, 1807
- Born: Joseph Halfpenny; 9 October 1748; Bishopthorpe, York
- Died: 11 July 1811 (aged 62); York
- Known for: Engravings, drawings and recording the gothic ornaments in York Minster and buildings of York, published as Fragmenta Vetusta.

Joseph Halfpenny (1748–1811) was an English draughtsman and engraver.

== Life ==
Halfpenny was born on 9 October 1748 in Hull but moved later to Bishopthorpe in Yorkshire, where his father was gardener to the Archbishop of York. He was apprenticed to a house-painter, and practised house-painting in York for some years. He afterwards raised himself to the position of an artist and a teacher of drawing. He acted as clerk of the works to John Carr the architect who was restoring York Minster, and repaired some of its old decoration.

Halfpenny was twice married, and was survived by two daughters, Margaret and Charlotte. He died at his house in Gillygate, York, on 11 July 1811, and was buried in the churchyard of St Olave's Church.

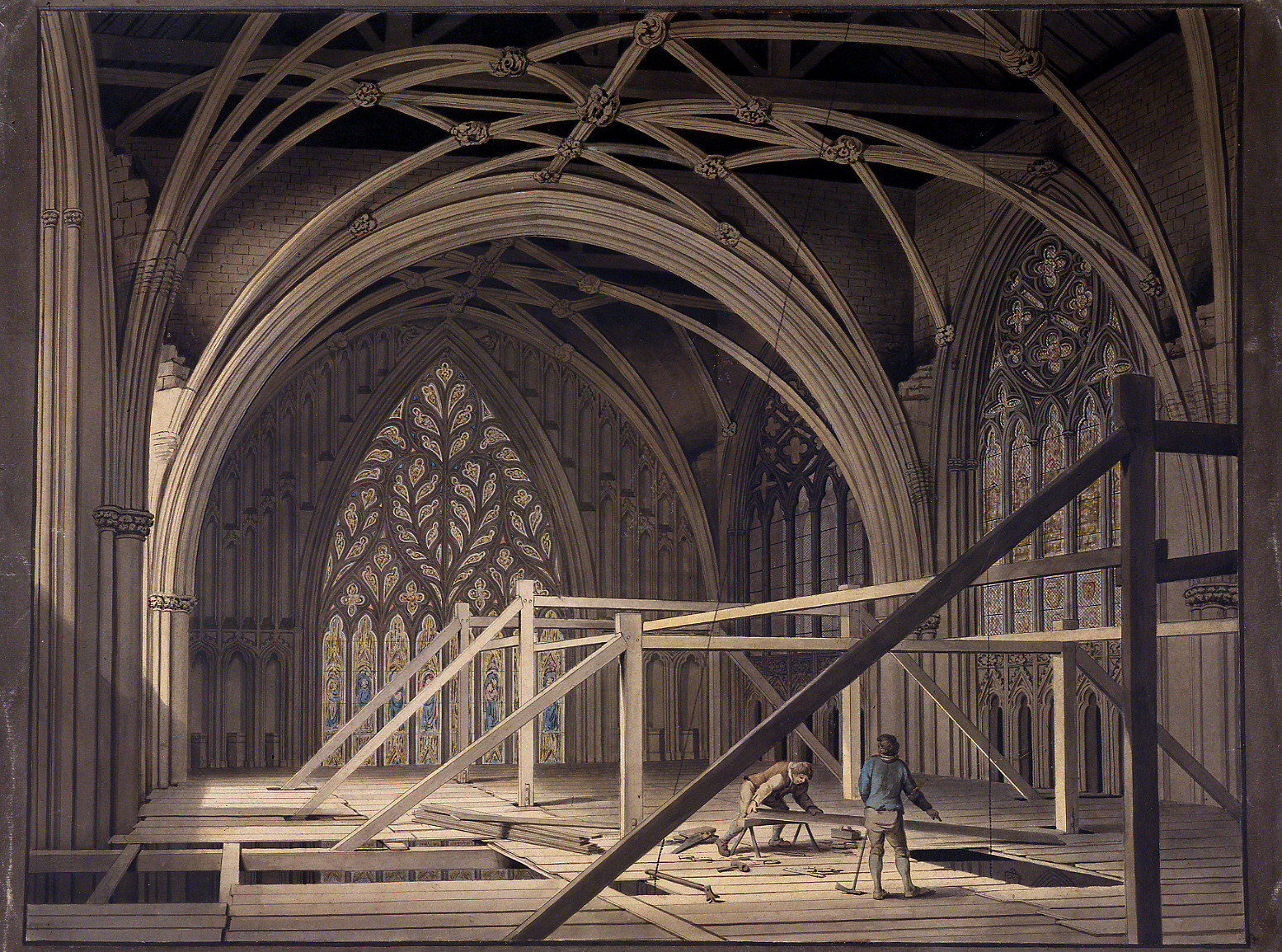
Scaffolding at the West End of York Minster

== Works ==
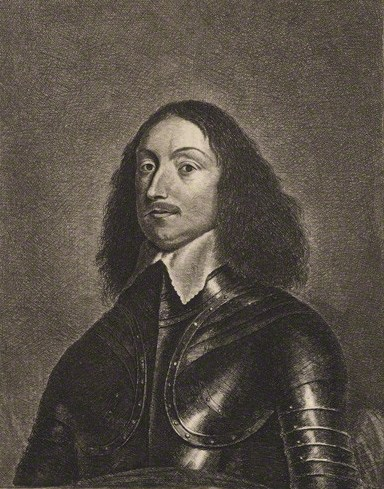
Sir Thomas Herbert, 1st Baronet, engraving by Joseph Halfpenny

From the scaffolding put up in York Minster, Halfpenny made drawings of Gothic ornaments that made his name. They include a record of some portions of the building that were later damaged by fire. In 1795 Halfpenny began to publish by subscription Gothic Ornaments in the Cathedral Church of York, completed in twenty numbers in 1800. It was reprinted in 1807, under the old date, and a second edition appeared in 1831. The work consists of 175 specimens of ornament and four views of the interior of the church and chapter-house. His Fragmenta Vetusta, or the Remains of Ancient Buildings in York, was published in 1807. In both these works Halfpenny acted as his own engraver.

Halfpenny also drew and engraved the monument of Archbishop Henry Bowet in York Minster, for the second volume of Richard Gough's Sepulchral Monuments. Five views of churches in Yorkshire were published in 1816 and 1817, after his death, by his daughter. Other works included landscapes and engraved portraits.

== Notes ==
Attribution

This article incorporates text from a publication now in the public domain: Stephen, Leslie; Lee, Sidney, eds. (1890). "Halfpenny, Joseph". Dictionary of National Biography. Vol. 24. London: Smith, Elder & Co.
