= East Hall, Middleton Tyas =

Building in North Yorkshire, England

East Hall

General information
- Type: Country house
- Architectural style: Georgian vernacular / Classical
- Location: Middleton Tyas, North Yorkshire, England
- Coordinates: 54.44878°N 1.64978°W
- Grid position: NZ 22809 05987
- Construction started: Early to mid-18th century
- Owner: Private

Technical details
- Material: Sandstone ashlar and rubble, Westmorland slate roof

Listed Building – Grade II*
- Designated: 4 February 1969
- Reference no.: 1157407

East Hall is a Grade II* listed Georgian country house situated in the village of Middleton Tyas, North Yorkshire, England. Built in the early to mid-18th century, it is notable for its refined Palladian-influenced facade and well-preserved internal decorative plasterwork.

== History ==
Middleton Tyas experienced considerable prosperity in the 18th century following the discovery and extraction of copper in the surrounding parish, leading to the construction of several prominent gentry residences. East Hall was constructed during this period as a grand residential seat in 1713, for Leonard Hartley. Local news sources reporting on the history noted that in 1742, three tons of illicitly taken copper ore were discovered hidden in the cellars and grounds of East Hall.

In the late 18th century, a substantial rear service wing and additional domestic accommodation were added. The house has remained a private residence throughout its history and was designated a Grade II* listed building on 4 February 1969 under National Heritage List for England entry 1157407.

== Architecture ==
East Hall is constructed from sandstone ashlar with coursed rubble to the sides and rear, under a high-pitched Westmorland slate roof featuring hipped dormers, ashlar copings, and rusticated stone chimney stacks. The principal block is laid out in a symmetrical two-storey, five-bay plan with an attic and semi-basement.

=== Exterior ===
The south-facing front elevation is arranged in five symmetrical bays, flanked by rusticated stone quoins. The central bay features a raised stone porch accessed via a flight of stone steps. The doorway is framed by an architrave set beneath a decorative pediment supported by carved consoles. Windows throughout the front facade consist of multi-pane timber sashes set within molded stone surrounds with projecting sills and keystones. A prominent molded stone cornice and low parapet run across the top of the main elevation.

=== Interior ===
The interior retains exceptional 18th-century decorative features. Features elaborate rococo plaster ceiling mouldings and wall panels. The central oak staircase features turned balusters, a molded handrail, and carved tread ends. Ground-floor reception rooms retain original molded timber dado rails, raised-and-fielded panelled doors, and finely carved marble fireplace surrounds.

== Local planning and conservation authorities ==
East Hall sits within the boundaries for the Middleton Tyas Conservation Area Appraisal and Management Plan on School Bank.

== See also ==
- Grade II* listed buildings in North Yorkshire (district)
- Listed buildings in Middleton Tyas
