= John Carr (architect) =

English architect (1723–1807)

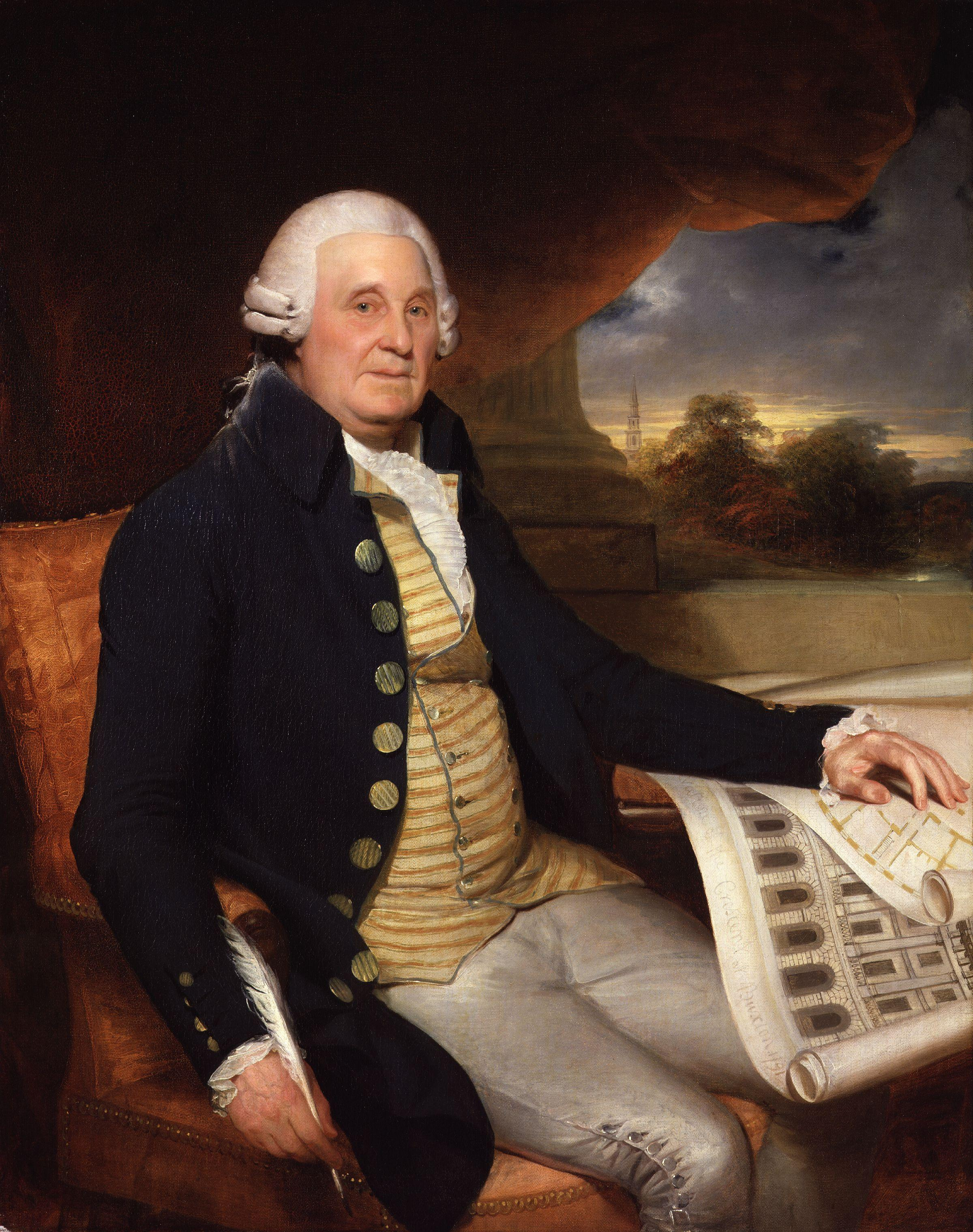
- Portrait of John Carr by William Beechey, 1791
- Born: 1723; Horbury, West Riding of Yorkshire, England
- Died: 22 February 1807 (aged 83–84); Askham Richard, West Riding of Yorkshire, England
- Occupation: Architect
- Buildings: Harewood House, Buxton Crescent, Gledhow Hall, Constable Burton Hall, Tabley House, Basildon Park, Lytham Hall, Fairfax House

John Carr (1723 – 22 February 1807) was an English architect. He is best known for Buxton Crescent in Derbyshire and Harewood House in West Yorkshire. Much of his work was in the Palladian style. In his day he was considered to be the leading architect in the north of England. Dr. Ivan Hall published in 2023 a study of John Carr after a lifetime's work (John Carr of York: Collected Essays).

== Life ==
He was born in 1723 in Horbury near Wakefield, West Riding of Yorkshire, the eldest of nine children and the son of a master mason, under whom he trained. He started an independent career in 1748 and continued until shortly before his death. John Carr was Lord Mayor of York in 1770 and again in 1785. Towards the end of his life Carr purchased an estate at Askham Richard, near York, to which he retired. On 22 February 1807 he died at Askham Hall. He was buried in St Peter and St Leonard's Church, Horbury, which he had designed and paid for.

== Career ==
Carr decided to remain in Yorkshire rather than move to London because he calculated that there was ample patronage and the wealth to sustain it. His largest work, only partially finished, was the Hospital de Santo António in Porto, Portugal. In order to maximise his income, he kept his staff to the minimum. His earliest assistant was architect William Lindley, who from 1774 developed an independent practice. He was followed by the elder Peter Atkinson and possibly his son Peter the younger. Carr's nephew William Carr also assisted him in his latter years. These architectural assistants had in turn 'boys' to help them. Carr rarely delegated matters that others would regard as too trivial, and in consequence he had to travel immense distances, mostly on horseback; however, the frequency of such visits brought him into regular contact with his many clients to mutual advantage.

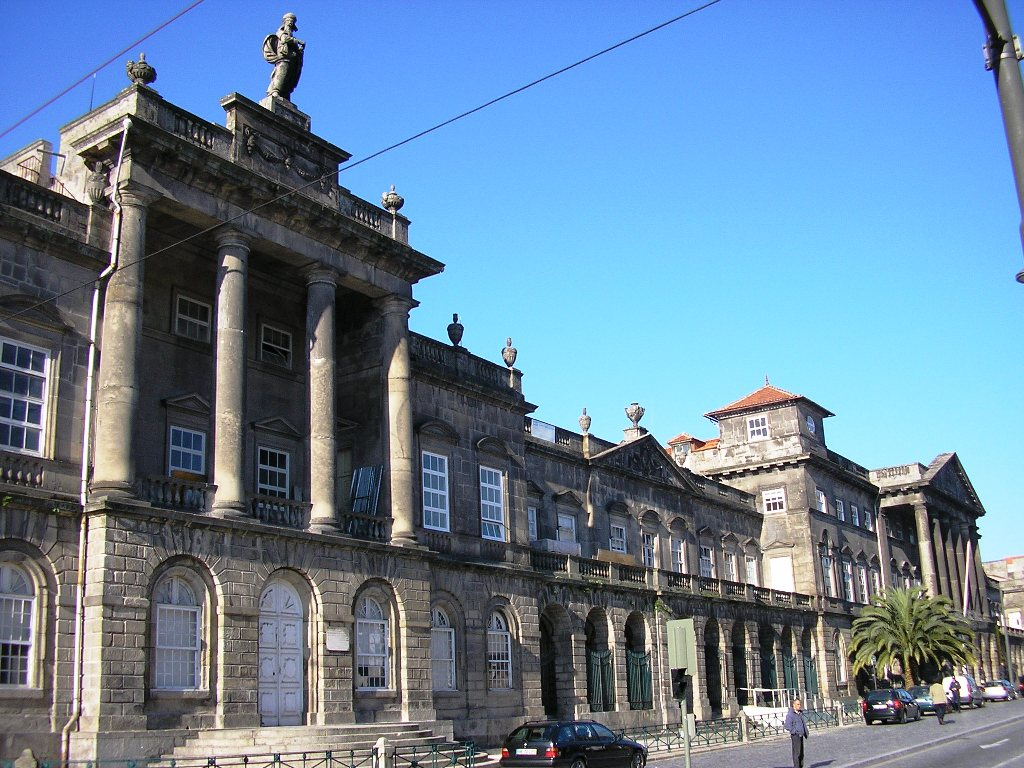
Santo António Hospital, Porto

Carr's own favourite work was Buxton Crescent in Derbyshire, an early example of multifunctional architecture. As well as hotels and lodging houses, it contained Assembly Rooms, shops, a post office and a public promenade all under one roof. On a smaller scale, the same is true of his Newark Town Hall.

Other public buildings included hospitals, such as Lincoln and York; racecourse grandstands, such as York, Doncaster and Nottingham (all now demolished); and prisons at Wakefield and Northallerton. He designed new churches as well as repairing old ones. The former were all privately financed, the latter were financed by the existing parishes. His single span roof construction allowed him to build the new churches without the traditional subdivision into nave and aisles.

He served as bridgemaster for both the North and West Ridings of Yorkshire, leaving a legacy of many bridges, the majority of which still stand today. The more than sixty bridges built or altered by Carr still serve the backbone of North Yorkshire's road-transport network. Carr was Lord Mayor of York in 1770 and 1785.

His commissions for country houses included model villages and farms, stable blocks, a variety of gate lodges and gateways, garden temples and other ornamental buildings. Notable among them his works for the estates of Harewood House and Wentworth Woodhouse.

He took particular care with their planning and construction to maximise value for money for both the immediate patron and for the buildings' future long-term maintenance. He used traditional materials and methods of construction where these had proved sound, but adopted new methods and materials where these could be shown to have an advantage. His training as a stonemason naturally led him to build in that material; in particular, he enjoyed using 'great' stones as at Tabley House. He liked well-proportioned rooms which were satisfactory living spaces with or without decorative enrichment. In his view the latter could be provided later if money permitted. As a result, most of his buildings were completed and because of the soundness of construction most survive.

Among the buildings accessible in whole or part to the public today are Buxton Crescent, Newark Town Hall, virtually all his bridges, Harewood House, Tabley House, Clifton House (now a museum in Rotherham), Lytham Hall and Fairfax House at 27 Castlegate York, now the headquarters of York Civic Trust.

== Influences ==
During his long career there were several major changes in architectural style. His early work is a mixture of the Palladian and the Rococo. He then sought a purer Antique Roman style with occasional French influences before adapting the currently fashionable style associated with Robert Adam. At the end of his life he returned to the bolder Palladian style of his youth but with detail that looked forward to 19th-century usage.

Carr's work was influenced by the books of Sebastiano Serlio and Andrea Palladio. He subscribed to many architectural pattern books, including those of his friend George Richardson, and also contemporary publications by Robert Morris and William Chambers.

== List of works ==
=== Public buildings ===
(dem = demolished) in chronological order, county given if not Yorkshire

- York The Pikeing Well-House New Walk 1752–1756
- York Grandstand Knavesmire Racecourse 1755–1756, demolished
- Beverley Assembly Rooms, 1761–1763 demolished
- Wakefield, The House of Correction, 1766–1770 demolished
- Leeds, The General Infirmary, 1768–1771 demolished
- Porto, Portugal, The Hospital de Santo António 1769 – c. 1843
- Newark Town Hall, Newark, Nottinghamshire, Town Hall, Assembly Rooms and Market Hall, 1773–1776
- York, Assize Courts, now York Crown Court 1773–1777
- York County Lunatic Asylum, 1774–1777
- Lincoln County Hospital, Lincolnshire, 1776
- Doncaster, Racecourse Grandstand, 1777–1781 demolished
- Nottingham, racecourse grandstand, 1777 demolished
- Nottingham, Nottinghamshire, Assembly Rooms, 1778 demolished
- Kelso, Roxburghshire, design for Racecourse Grandstand, 1778 (built in 1822)
- Buxton, Derbyshire, The Assembly Rooms in the Crescent 1779–1790
- York, The Female Prison, 1780–1783
- Northallerton, Court House, 1784–1788 demolished
- Northallerton, House of Correction 1784–1788
- Chesterfield, Derbyshire, Town Hall, 1787–1788 demolished
- Lismore, County Waterford in Ireland, design for court building, today a heritage centre 1799
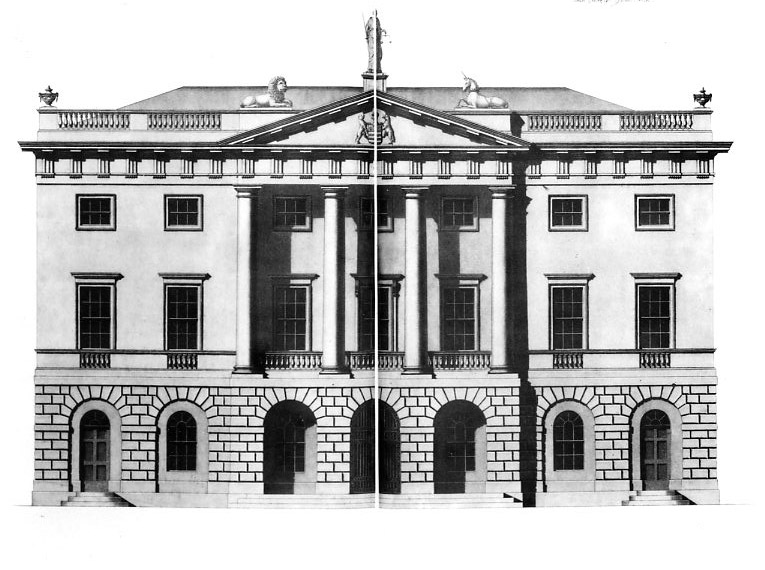
Newark Town Hall

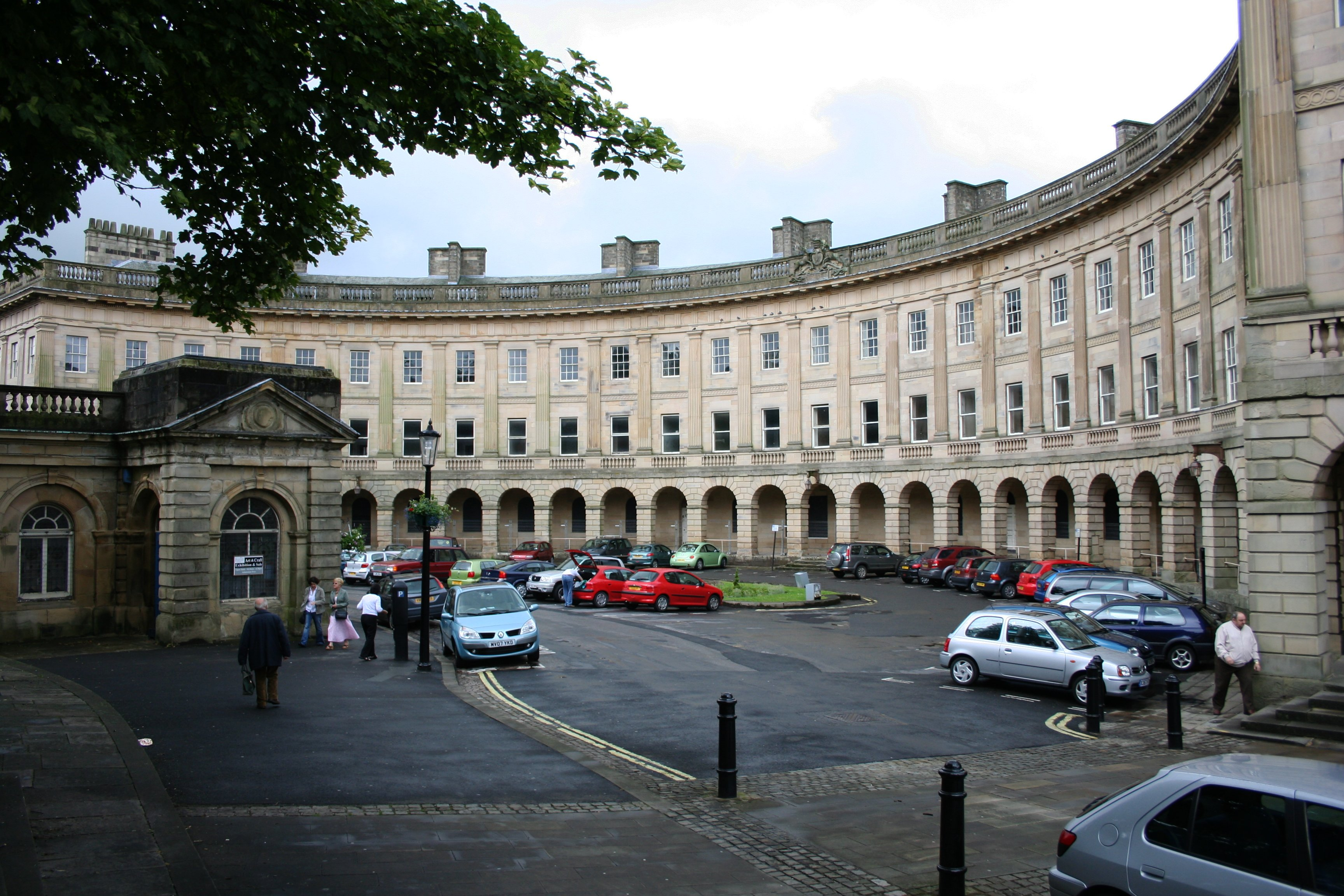
Buxton Crescent

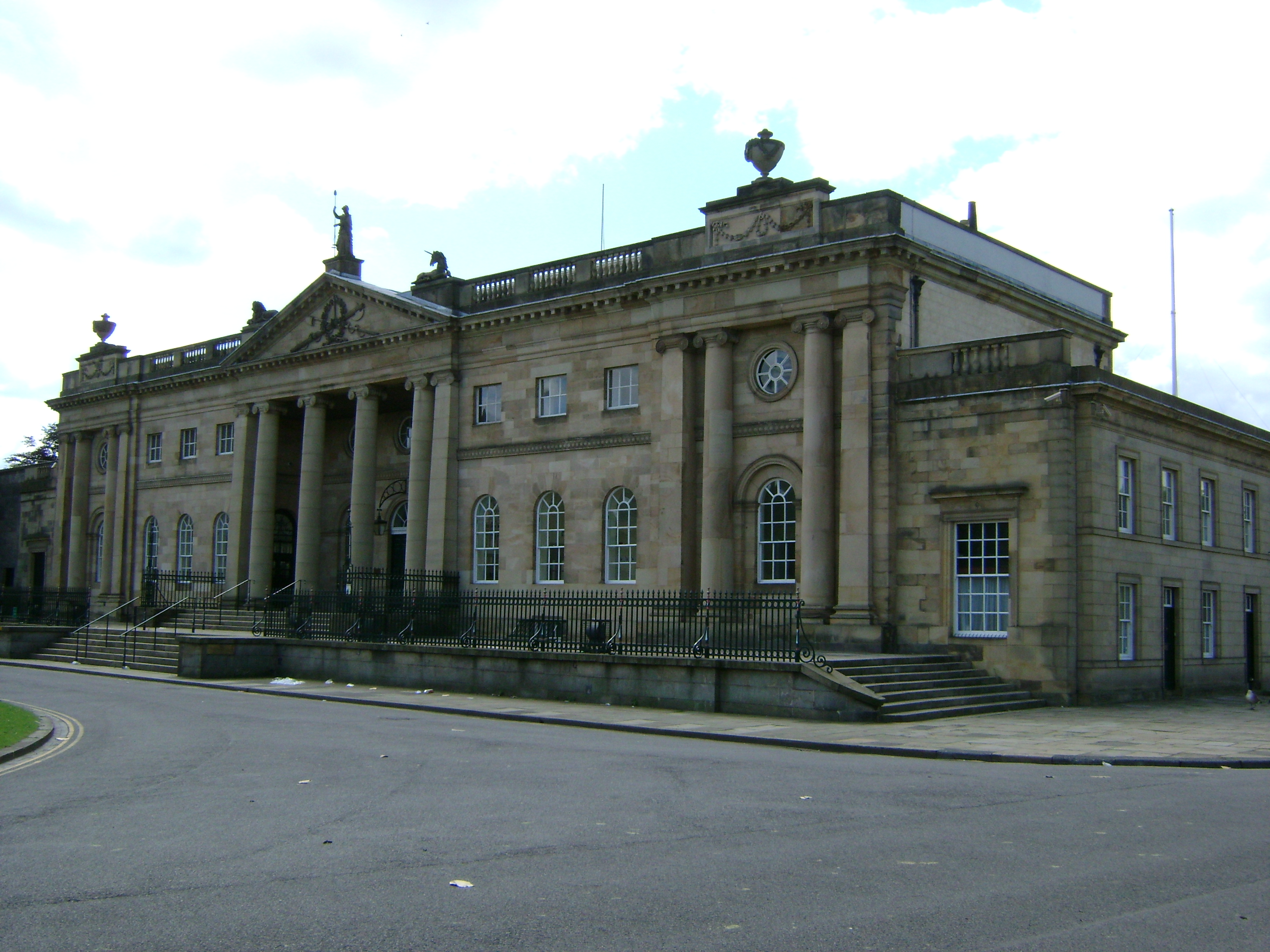
York Assize Courts

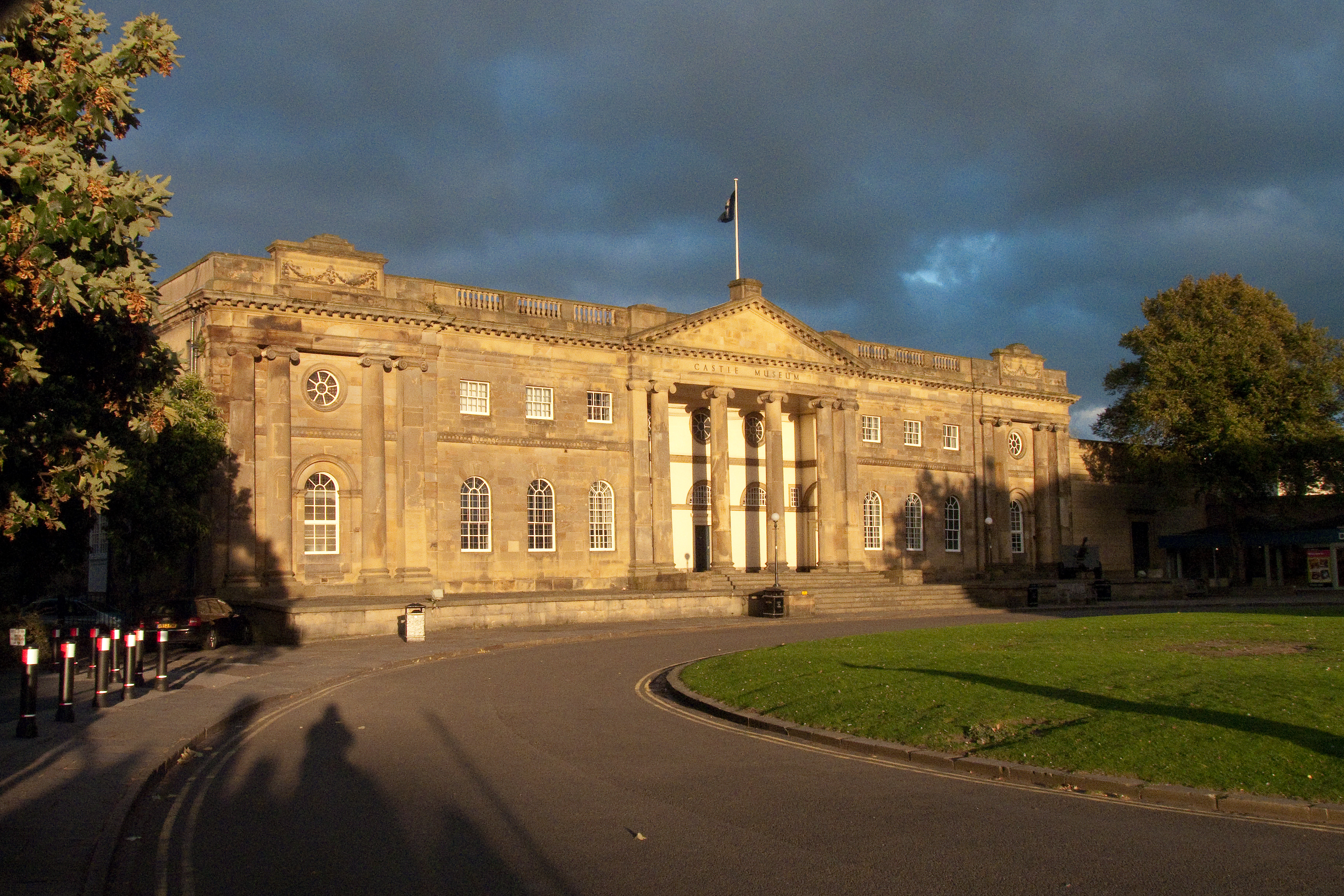
Female Prison York

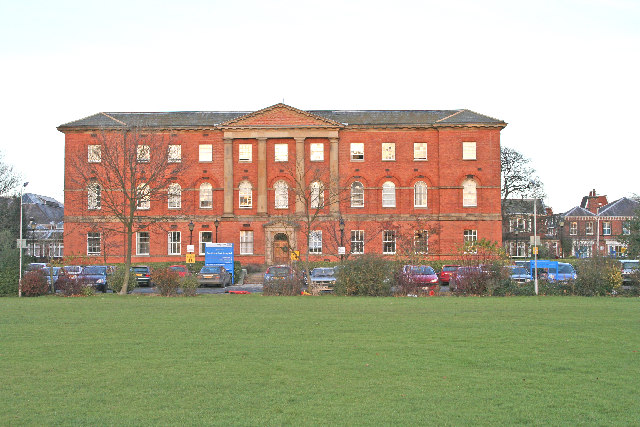
Bootham Park Hospital York

=== Churches ===
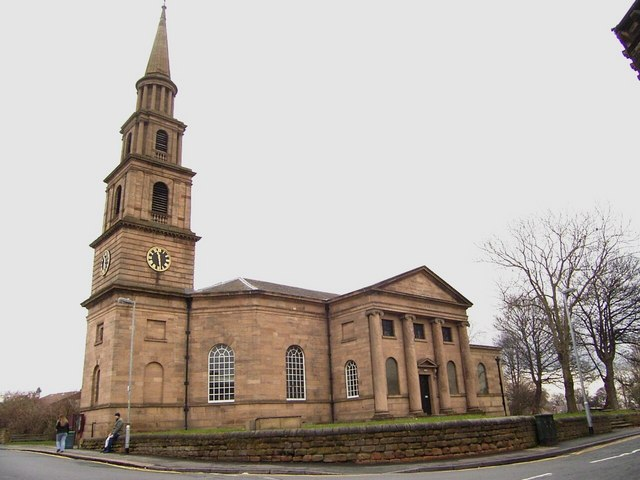
Horbury Church, where Carr is buried

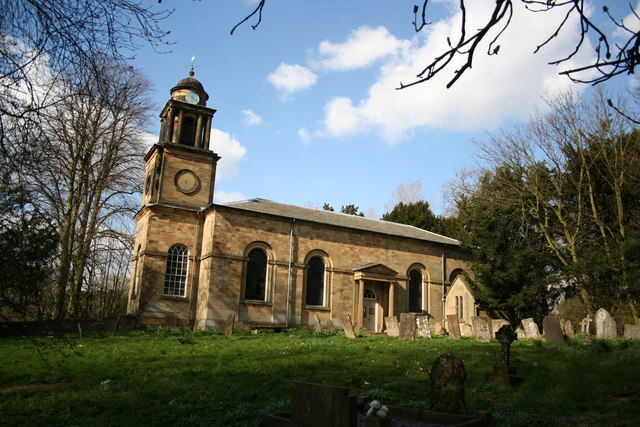
Holy Rood Church, Ossington, Nottinghamshire

- Ravenfield, 1756
- Kirkleatham, Payment for design, 1759
- Dewsbury Minster, Partly rebuilt 1765–1767
- Bierley, 1766, attributed to Carr
- Boynton, largely rebuilt 1768–1770
- York Minster, survey and repairs 1770–1773 and 1794–1797; Joseph Halfpenny was clerk of works on this project
- Sheffield Cathedral of St. Peter, alterations 1773–1775
- Rokeby, completed church 1777–78
- Denton, 1776; attributed to Carr
- Holy Rood Church, Ossington, Nottinghamshire, 1782–83
- St Peter and St Leonard's Church, Horbury, 1790–1794

=== Bridges ===
Listed bridges include:

Name	Location	Type	Completed (Note: The date given is the date used by Historic England as significant for the initial building or that of an important part in the structure's description.)	Date designated	Grid ref. (Note: The grid reference is based on the British national grid reference system, sometimes known as OSGB36, used by the Ordnance Survey.) Geo-coordinates	Entry number (Note: The "List Entry Number" is a unique number assigned to each listed building and scheduled monument by Historic England.)	Image
Appersett Bridge	Richmondshire, North Yorkshire	Bridge	c. 1795	25 March 1969	SD 85758 90684; 54°18′42″N 2°13′13″W	1316891	Appersett Bridge More images
Ayton Bridge	East Ayton and West Ayton, North Yorkshire	Bridge	c. 1775	18 January 1967	SE 98796 84789; 54°14′57″N 0°29′07″W	1148136	Ayton Bridge More images
Barnard Castle Bridge River Tees	Barnard Castle, County Durham	Bridge	c. 1771	24 February 1950	NZ 04812 16389; 54°32′34″N 1°55′38″W	1201056	Barnard Castle Bridge River Tees More images
Blyth Bridge	Blyth, Nottinghamshire	Bridge	c. 1776	2 January 1952	SK 61732 87204; 53°22′41″N 1°04′25″W	1238969	Blyth Bridge More images
Borough Bridge	Boroughbridge, North Yorkshire	Bridge	c. 1784	20 June 1966	SE 39633 67003; 54°05′51″N 1°23′44″W	1293851	Borough Bridge More images
Bow Bridge River Rye Rosedale	River Rye, North Yorkshire	Bridge	c.	27 August 1987	SE 72455 95762; 54°21′08″N 0°53′12″W	1213659	Bow Bridge River Rye Rosedale
Bride over River Bain Bainbridge	River Bain, North Yorkshire	Bridge	c. 1785	25 March 1969	SD 93467 90112; 54°18′24″N 2°06′07″W	1132010	Bride over River Bain Bainbridge More images

Other bridges include:

==== North and East Ridings of Yorkshire ====
- Aysgarth (R.Ure), 1788
- Birdforth (Birdforth Beck), 1798, demolished
- Catterick, over River Swale, 1792
- Crambeck Bridge, 1785
- Croft, over River Tees, 1795
- Danby Wiske, 1782
- Downholme, over River Swale, 1773
- East Row, Sandsend, near Whitby, 1777
- Ellerbeck, near Osmotherley, 1790
- Greta, near Rokeby, 1773
- Grinton over R.Swale, 1797
- Hawnby, over River Rye), 1800
- Howsham Bridge, not executed
- Kilvington, over Spital Beck, 1774, demolished
- Kirkham Bridge, not executed
- Low Bourn, over River Burn, near Masham, 1775
- Morton on Swale, over River Swale, 1800–1803
- South Otterington, over River Wiske, 1776
- Reeth, over Arkle Beck, 1772–73
- Riccall, near Helmsley, 1803
- Richmond, over River Swale, 1789
- Rutherford, over River Greta, 1773
- Skeeby, 1782
- Skipton on Swale, 1783
- Strensall, over River Foss, 1798
- Thirkleby, 1799
- Thirsk Mill, Millgate, over Cod Beck, 1789
- York, Yearsley Bridge, over River Foss, 1794–95

==== West Riding ====
- Carlton Ferry, near Snaith, over River Aire, 1774
- Coniston Cold, over River Aire, 1763
- Ferry Bridge, Brotherton, over River Aire, 1797–1804
- Marle Bridge, over River Dearne, near Darfield, 1766
- Selby, 1795 in part for the wooden bridge

=== Private bridges ===
- Denton Park, c. 1770
- Harewood Park, Yorkshire, c. 1771
- Norton Place Park, Lincolnshire, c. 1776
- Unexecuted bridge designs for Wentworth Woodhouse, Yorkshire

=== Domestic architecture ===
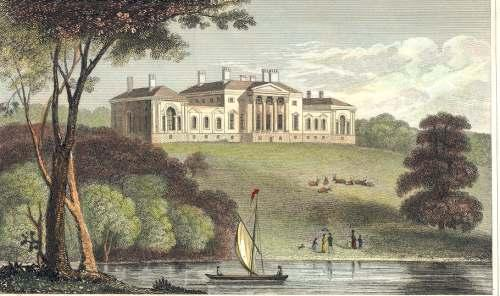
South front, Harewood House, before remodelling by Sir Charles Barry

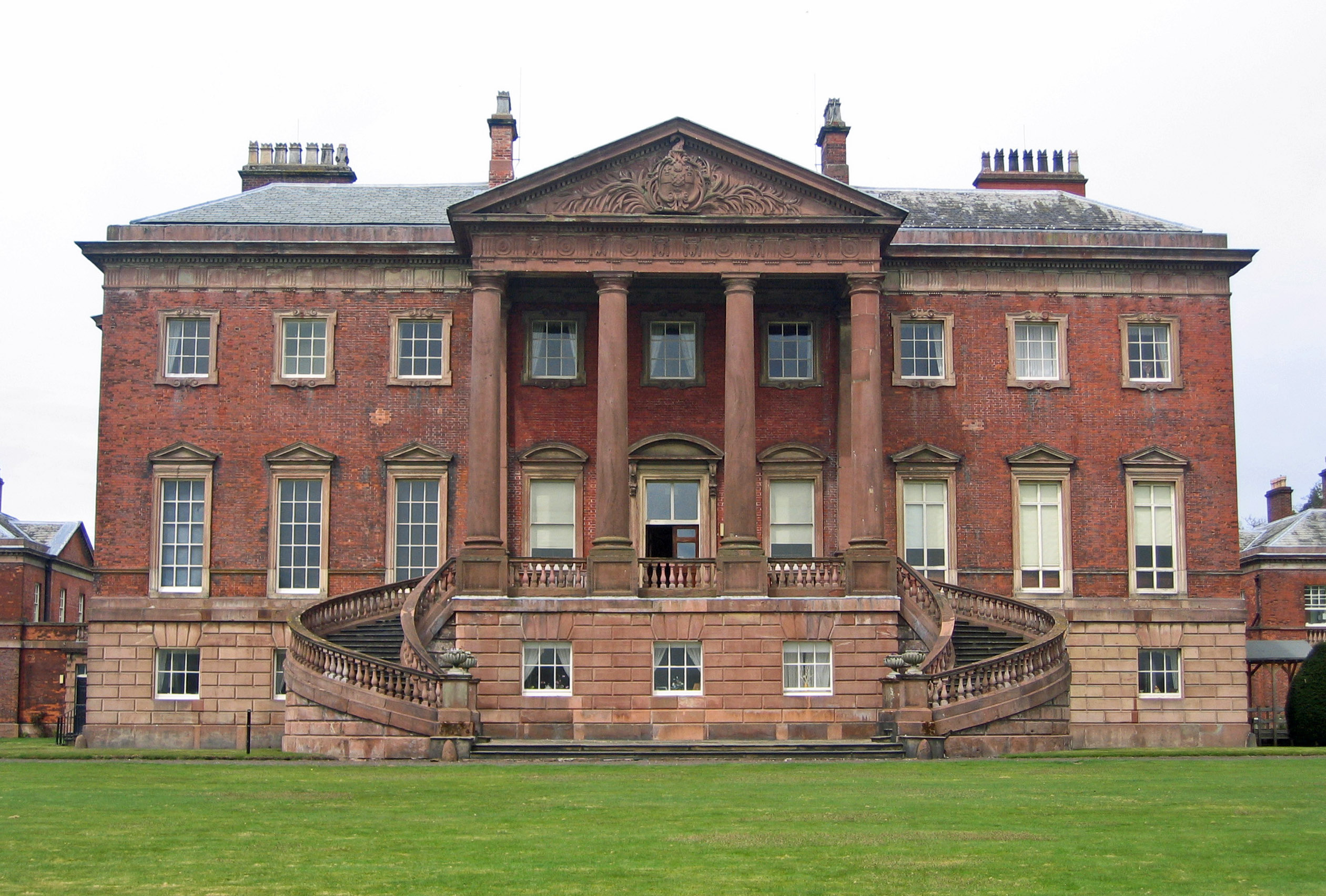
Tabley House, Cheshire

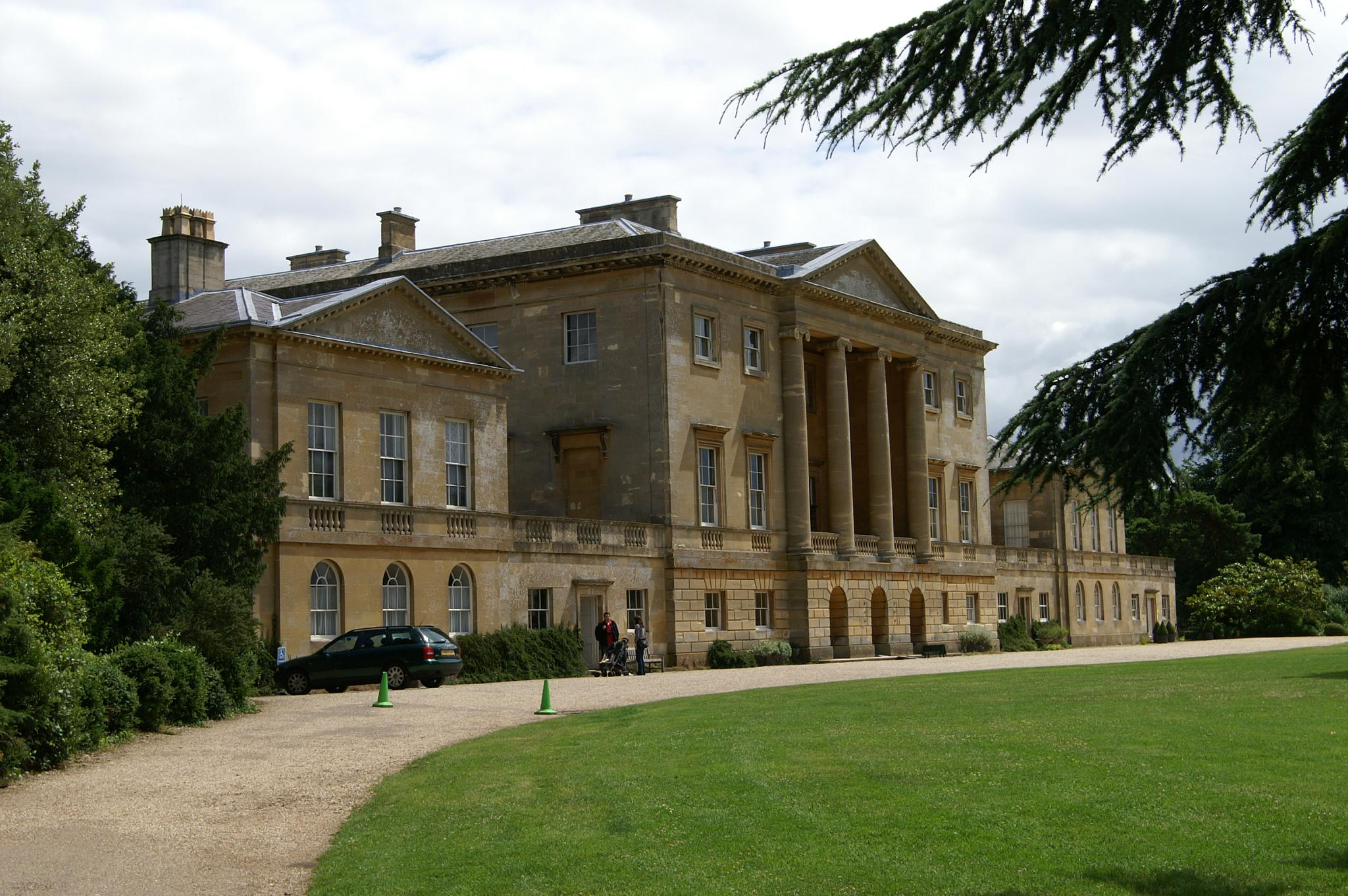
Basildon Park, Berkshire

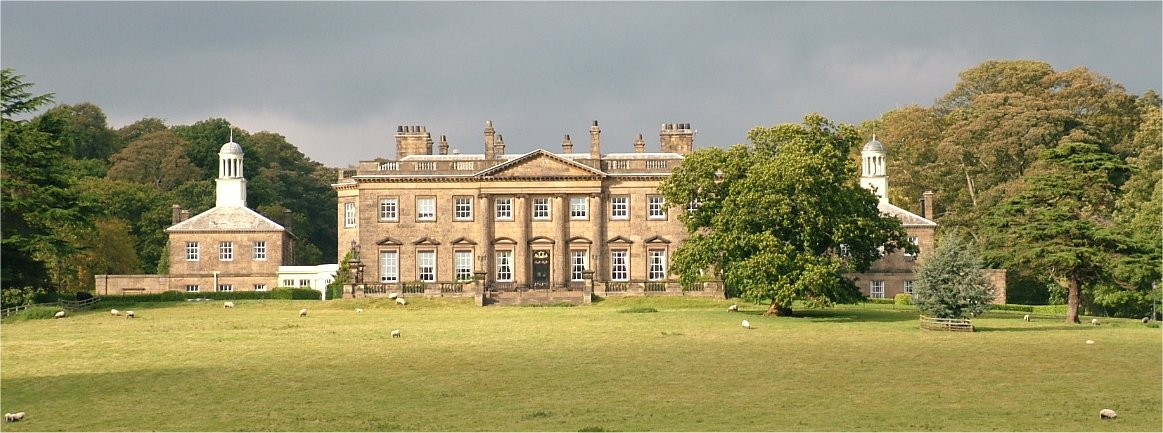
Denton Hall

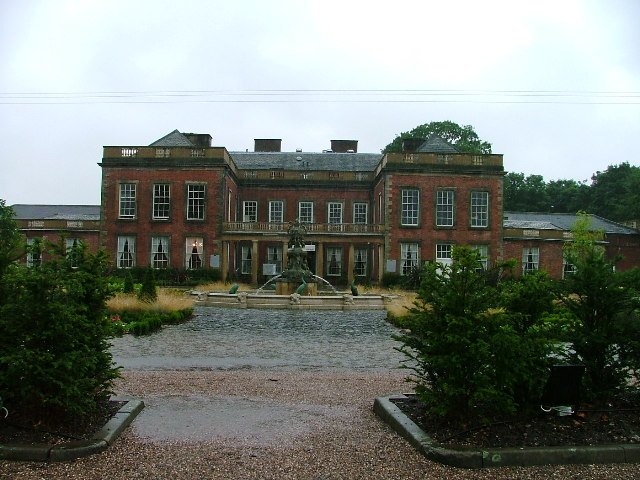
Colwick Hall, Nottinghamshire

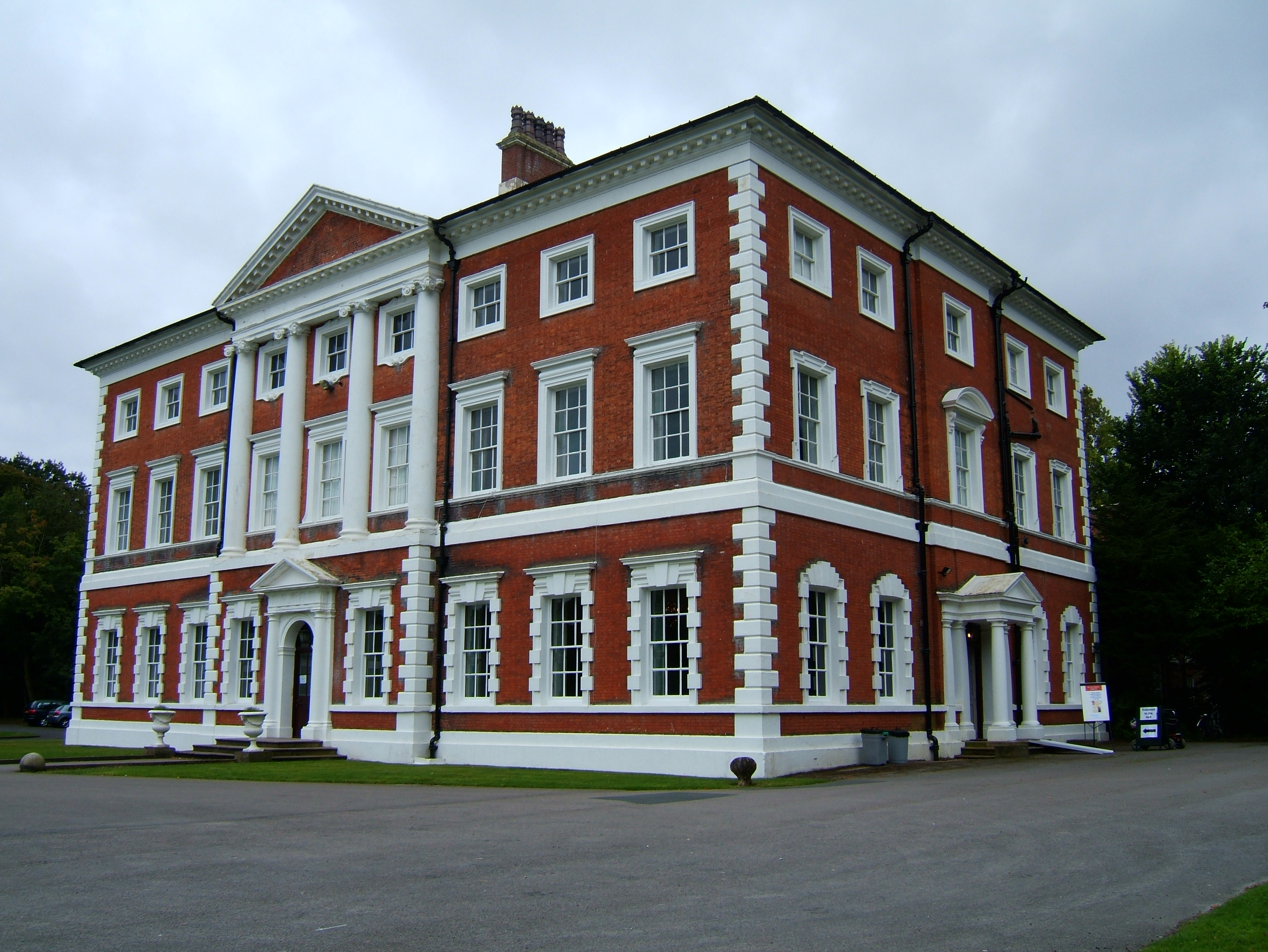
Lytham Hall, Lancashire

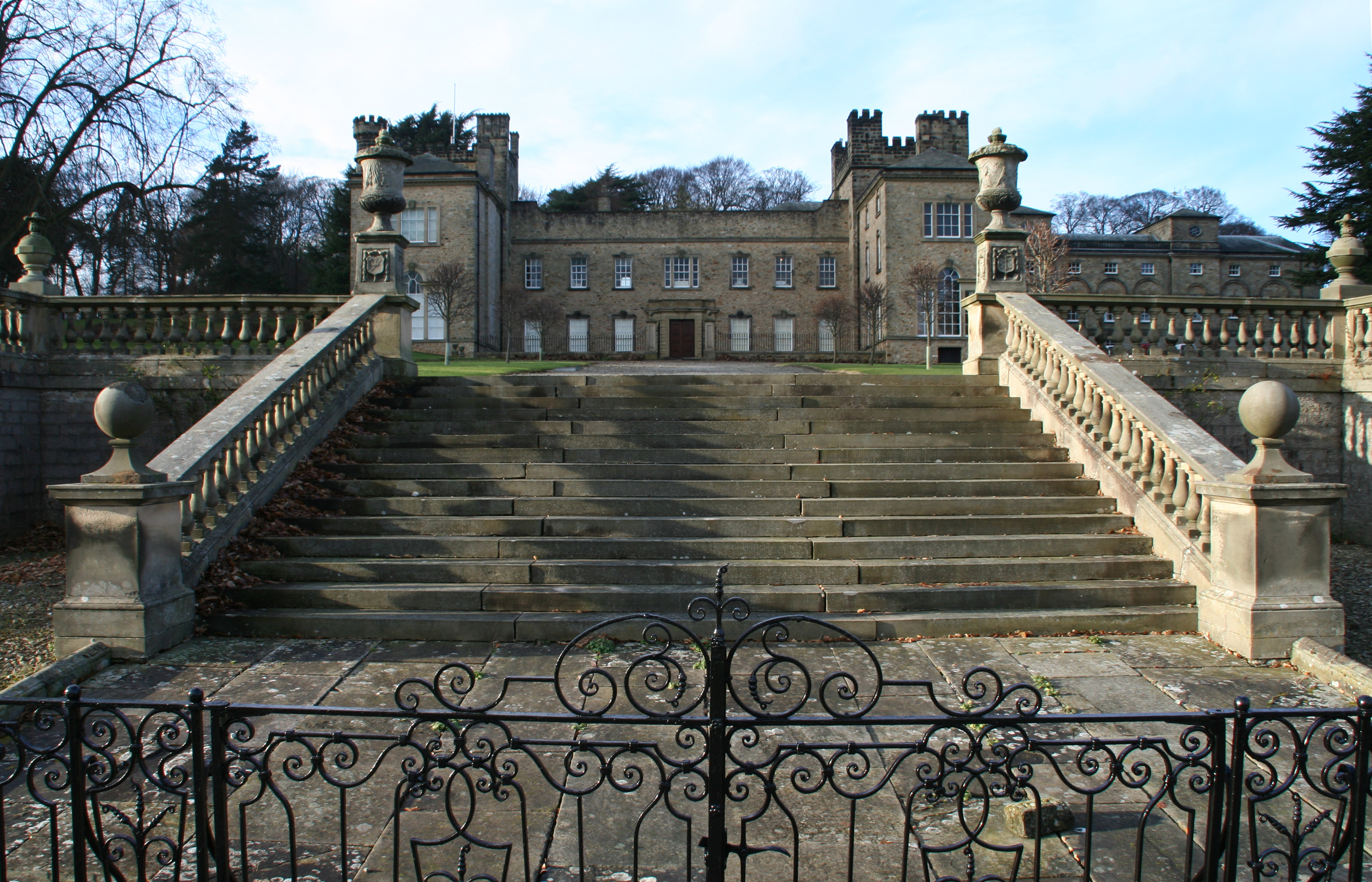
Aske Hall

(The following are in Yorkshire, unless otherwise stated)

- The New Lodge, New Lodge, Barnsley, c.1760, built as a dwelling for John Carr himself
- Kirby Hall, Ouseburn, 1747 – c.1755, demolished
- Huthwaite Hall, Thurgoland, 1748
- Askham Hall, Askham Richard, c.1750, demolished
- Thorp Arch Hall, 1750–1754
- Gledhow Hall, Gledhow, Roundhay, Leeds c. 1764 for J. Dixon
- Arncliffe Hall, Ingleby Arncliffe, c. 1750–1754
- York, 47 Bootham, 1753
- Campsmount, Campsall near Doncaster, 1752–1755, demolished
- Leeds, town house for J. Dixon 1753
- Durham House, Northallerton, c.1754
- Heath Hall, near Wakefield, 1754–1780
- Dower House, Heath.
- York, Petergate, house for J. Mitchell, 1755, demolished
- York, Fairfax House, 27 Castlegate, circa 1755–1762; Gilling Castle
- Howsham Mill, near Malton, c. 1755
- Plompton Hall, near Knaresborough, c. 1755–1762
- York, Garforth House, No. 54 Micklegate, c. 1755–1757
- Lytham Hall, Lancashire, 1757–1764
- Goldsborough Hall, remodelling, c. 1750s
- Newby Hall, remodelling, c. 1758–1760
- Everingham Hall 1758–1764
- Kirklees Hall, alterations, 1759–60
- Harewood House, 1755–1771 (except the decoration of the principal rooms)
- Harewood village and other estate buildings
- Kirkland Hall, near Garstang, Lancashire. 1760, attributed to Carr
- Ravenfield Hall, near Rotherham, alterations, 1760–1770, demolished
- Tabley House, Cheshire, c. 1760–1777
- Hornby Castle, c. 1760–1770, partly demolished
- Wentworth Woodhouse, c. 1760–1804, completed the house, and numerous important estate buildings
- Clints Hall near Richmond, demolished
- Castlegate House, Castlegate, York, 1762–63
- Campsall Hall, alterations, 1762–1764, demolished
- Stapleton Park, c. 1762–1764, demolished
- Grove Hall, near Retford, Nottinghamshire remodelled c. 1762, demolished
- Constable Burton Hall, c. 1762–1768
- Escrick Park, remodelled, 1763–1765
- White Windows, Sowerby Bridge, 1763–1768
- Welbeck Abbey, Nottinghamshire 1763, 1774–1777
- Cannon Hall near Barnsley, 1764, 1778 onwards
- Goldsborough Hall nr. Knaresborough, internal alterations, 1764–65
- Swinton Park, near Masham, alterations 1764–1767
- Kirkleatham Hall, remodelling, 1764–1767, demolished
- Swarland Hall, near Felton, Northumberland, 1765, attributed to Carr, demolished
- Courteenhall, Northamptonshire, stables, after 1765
- York, Skeldergate, his own house, 1765–1769, demolished
- Aske Hall, c. 1765–1769
- Boynton Hall near Bridlington, c.1765–1780
- Fangfoss Hall, East Yorkshire c.1766
- Halifax, Somerset House and warehouse, c.1766
- Towneley Hall, Lancashire, interiors, 1766–67
- Pye Nest near Halifax, 1767, demolished
- Thoresby Hall, Nottinghamshire, 1767–1771, demolished
- Castle William, Budby Nottinghamshire, Thoresby Hall Estate c.1767
- Auckland Castle, Bishop Auckland, County Durham, alterations c.1767–1772 attributed to Carr
- Raby Castle, County Durham, remodelled, 1768–1788
- Leeds, Bridge End, house for Mr. Green, before 1769
- Kilnwick Hall, remodelled 1769–1772, 1781, demolished
- Townend Farm, Kilnwick, 1770
- The Shay, near Halifax, c.1770, demolished
- Byram Hall and farm near Ferrybridge, remodelled c.1770, largely demolished
- Gledstone Hall and stables near Skipton, c.1770, attributed to Carr, house demolished
- Aston Rectory, near Rotherham, c. 1770
- Somerby Hall, Somerby, Lincolnshire monument ashlar Doric column topped by an urn for Edward Weston
- Sedbury Park, near Richmond, alterations c.1770 house, demolished
- Denton Hall, Wharfedale, 1769–1781
- Chesters, near Hexham, Northumberland, 1771
- Aston Hall near Rotherham, 1760s
- Thirsk Hall, additions, 1771–1773
- London, Burlington House, Piccadilly, internal alterations, c. 1771–1775 demolished
- Ormesby Hall near Middlesbrough, stables and entrance lodge, c. 1772; attributed to Carr
- Redbourne Hall, Lincolnshire, alterations, 1773
- Blyth Hall, Nottinghamshire, 1773–1776, demolished
- Leventhorpe Hall, near Leeds, 1774
- Castle Howard, alterations and The Stables, 1774–1782
- Panton Hall, near Wragby, Lincolnshire, remodelling, 1775, demolished
- Ribston Hall, near Knaresborough, alterations and stables, c. 1775, attributed to Carr

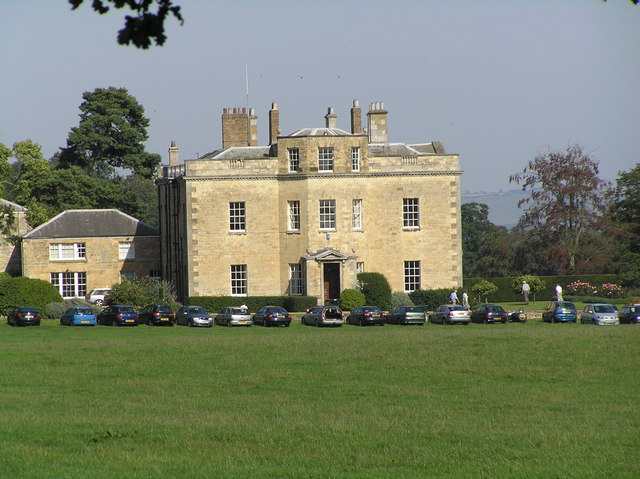
Norton Place, Lincolnshire

- Norton Place, Bishop Norton, Lincolnshire 1776
- Billing Hall, Great Billing, Northamptonshire, 1776, demolished
- Basildon Park, Berkshire, 1776
- Colwick Hall, Nottinghamshire, remodelled 1776
- Middleton Lodge, Middleton Tyas, 1777–1780
- Sledmere, Castle Farm and designs for Sledmere House 1778
- Clifton Hall, Nottinghamshire. alterations, 1778–97
- Staunton in the Vale Hall, Nottinghamshire, alterations 1778–1785
- Bolling Hall, near Bradford, alterations 1779–80
- Thornes House, near Wakefield, designs for house, 1779–1781, demolished
- Langford Hall, Nottinghamshire c. 1780
- Badsworth Hall, c. 1780, demolished
- New Lodge, Wakefield Road, Barnsley, c. 1780
- Wiganthorpe Hall, near Malton, c. 1780 demolished
- Buxton, Derbyshire, The Crescent, St. Ann's Well, and Great Stables. 1779–1790
- Grimston Garth, near Aldborough, 1781–1786
- Chatsworth House, Derbyshire, internal redecoration, c. 1782–1784; (and for the same patron, the repair of Hardwick Hall)
- Clifton House, Rotherham,1783
- Holker Hall, near Cartmel, Lancashire, minor works c. 1783, 1787
- Workington Hall, Cumberland, extensive remodelling, 1783–1791
- Belle Isle, Windermere, for the same patron, and minor changes
- Cradside House Scotland
- Sand Hutton Park, 1786, demolished
- Eastwood House, Rotherham, 1786–87 demolished
- Farnley Hall, near Otley, major extension, 1786–1790
- Castle William, Budby, Nottinghamshire, c.1789
- Durham Castle, remodelled gateway 1791
- Bretton Hall, alterations, 1790s
- Leck Hall, c.1790s
- Wood Hall, near Wetherby, c.1795
- Fawley Court, Buckinghamshire, lodges, 1797–1799
- Belle Vue (Claife Viewing Station) near Hawkshead, Lancashire, belvedere c.1799
- Coolattin Park (Malton House), Shillelagh, County Wicklow, Ireland 1800–1808
- Milton Hall, near Peterborough, Northamptonshire, internal alterations c.1803 and orangery, 1788–9
- Upleatham Hall, alterations, date uncertain
- Tankersley Park, temple, date uncertain
- Obelisk and monument: Knox's Hill, Armagh, 1782–83
- Bramham Park, after 1773, attributed to Carr
- Wall monument, Otley All Saints, to Francis Fawkes of Farnley Hall, 1754, signed J. Carr
- Wall monument design for Buxton family (Goodchild Collection Wakefield)
- Wood Hall Yorkshire
- Chevet Hall, Wakefield (demolished) and stable block
- Hook Moor Lodges, Great North Road (A1), Aberford, West Yorkshire, part of the Parlington Hall Estate
