= Lady Alicia Blackwood =

British painter

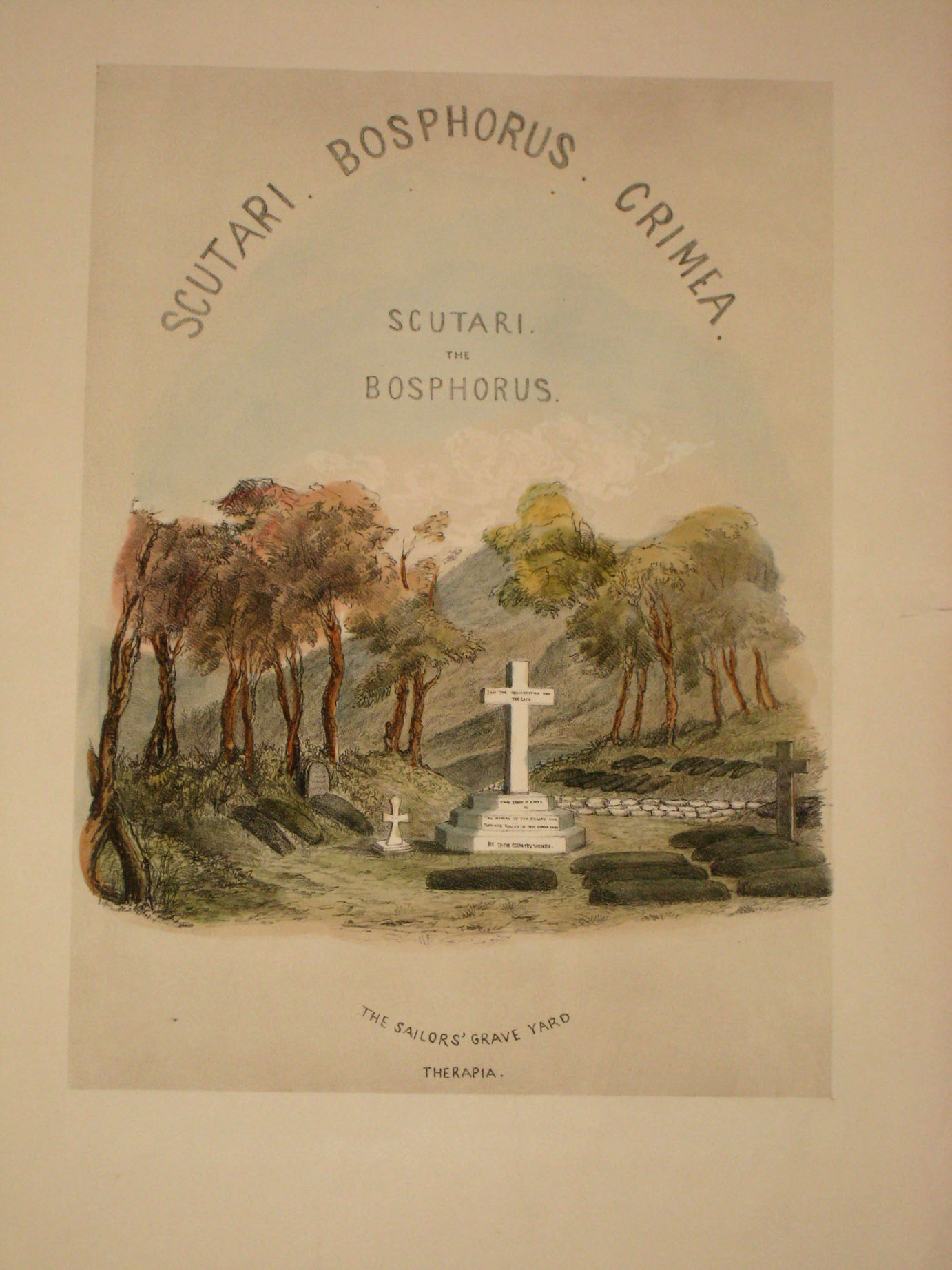

Lady Alicia Blackwood née Lambart, (1818 – 30 July 1913), the daughter of George Frederick Augustus Lambart, Viscount Kilcoursie (1789–1828) and Sarah Coppin, was an English painter and nurse, married to the Rev. James Stevenson Blackwood.

== Crimean War experiences ==
As she recounts in A Narrative of Personal Experiences & Impressions during a Residence on the Bosphorus throughout the Crimean War (1881), Lady Alicia Blackwood and her husband "were deeply moved to go out" after hearing of "the battle of Inkerman, that terribly hard-fought struggle". Dr. Blackwood obtained a chaplaincy to the forces; Lady Alicia and two young women friends accompanied him, determined to find some way to help. Lady Alicia applied to Florence Nightingale at Scutari in December 1854. Nightingale's opinion of ladies who came out to assist the hospitals was generally low, as is shown in their first conversation, related by Lady Alicia:

I applied to Miss Nightingale to know where I could be most usefully employed. Possibly at this long distance of time she may forget that particular interview, but I do not; for the reply she gave me, or rather the question she put to me in reply, after a few seconds of silence, with a peculiar expression of countenance, made an indelible impression.

"Do you mean what you say?"

I own I was rather surprised.

"Yes, certainly; why do you ask me that?" I said.

"Oh, because," she responded, "I have had several such applications before, and when I have suggested work, I found it could not be done, or some excuse was made; it was not exactly the sort of thing that was intended, it required special suitability, &c."

"Well," I replied, "I am in earnest; we came out here with no other wish than to help where we could, and to be useful if possible."

"Very well, then," said Miss Nightingale, "if this is so, you really can help me if you will; in this Barrack are now located some two hundred poor women in the most abject misery. They are the wives of the soldiers who were allowed to accompany their husbands; a great number have been sent down from Varna; they are in rags, and covered with vermin. My heart bleeds for them, and they are at our doors daily clamouring for everything; but it is impossible for me to attend to them, my work is with the soldiers, not with their wives. Now, will you undertake to look after these poor women and relieve me from their importunity? there are funds to help, and bales of free gifts sent out; but we are so occupied, it is not possible for us to administer them. If you will take the women as your charge, I will send an orderly who will show you their haunts."

Of course I assented at once.

In this way Lady Alicia Blackwood was delegated by Florence Nightingale to create and manage an unofficial hospital for the wives, widows and children of soldiers in Scutari. In a letter of March 18, 1855, Nightingale disparagingly refers to the women and children as Allobroges, the shrieking camp followers of the ancient Gauls. In her account, Lady Alicia describes the horrific conditions under which she found them, "as much sinned against as sinning", and discusses the changes she was able to make for their relief as part of her work. Blackwood's respect for Nightingale and her work are evident throughout her account, which is both vivid and enjoyable to read.
