= East Hall (Ocala, Florida) =

- U.S. National Register of Historic Places
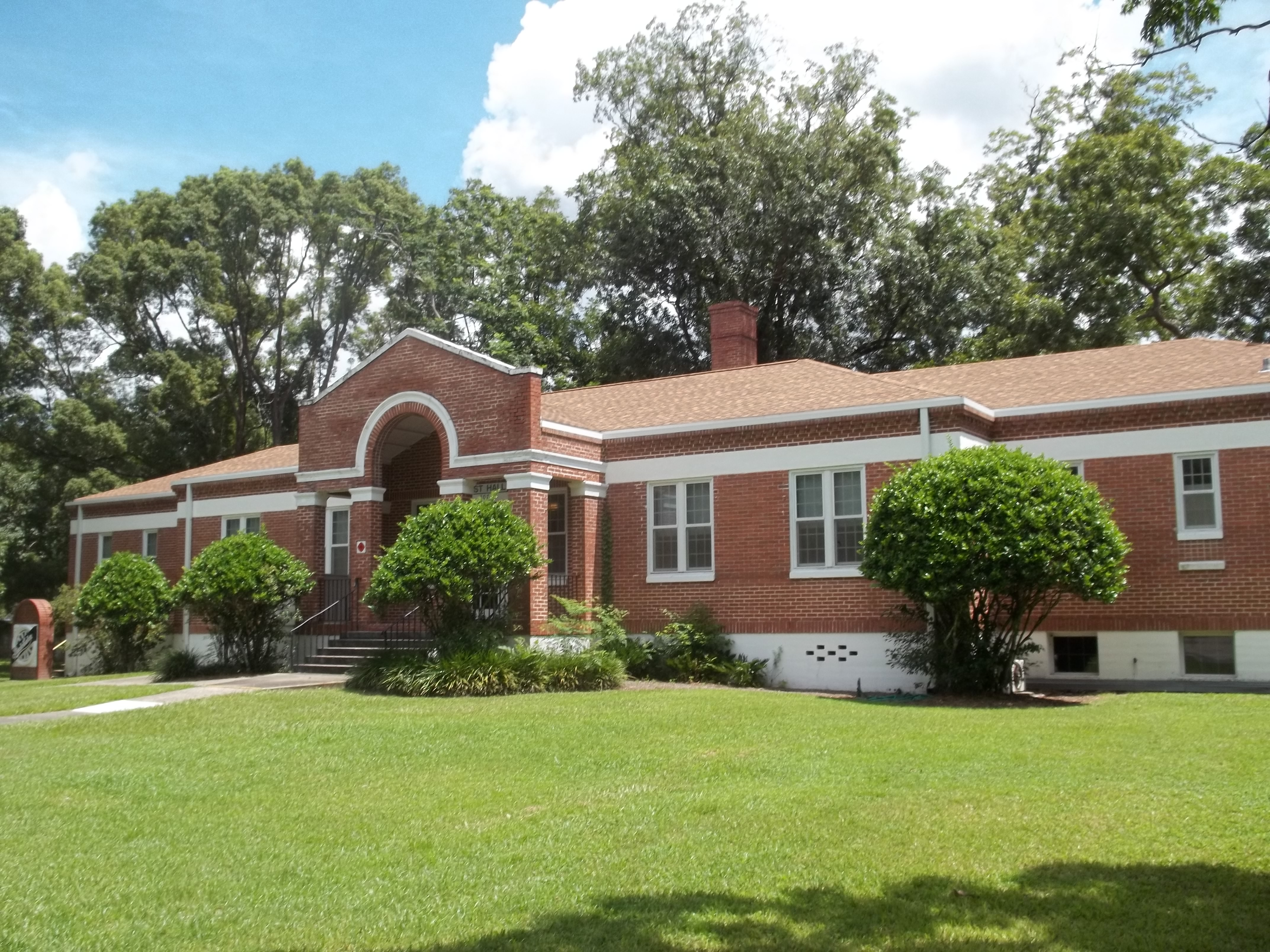

- Location within Florida Location within the United States
- Location: 307 SE. 26th Terr., Ocala, Florida
- Coordinates: 29°11′3″N 82°6′2″W
- Area: 2 acres (0.81 ha)
- Built: 1936
- Architect: Frank Parzaile; Builder: PWA
- NRHP reference No.: 95000924
- Added to NRHP: July 28, 1995

East Hall (also known as the Florida Industrial School for Girls) is an historic one-story redbrick building located at 307 Southeast 26th Terrace in Ocala, Florida, United States. It is located on the grounds of the Marion County McPherson Governmental Complex. Designed by architect Frank Parzaile, it was built in 1936 by the Public Works Administration. On July 28, 1995, it was added to the U.S. National Register of Historic Places. It is home to the Marion County Museum of History and Archaeology.

== History ==
The Florida Industrial School for Girls was a reclamation school for delinquent females in Ocala, Florida. The state legislature first established the school in 1915, and was opened in 1917. The industrial school originally accepted girls from nine to seventeen years of age, but later accepted only those ages twelve to seventeen. No pregnant females were allowed. They were trained in home economics as well as traditional school curricula. In 1995, it was listed on the National Register of Historic Places.

East Hall served as the isolation and detention building for the school after its construction in 1936. The interior of the building was made up of twelve cell-like rooms, two bathrooms, and the housemother's suite. During the girls confinement, they were placed in their separate rooms and were not allowed to attend classes or leave the building.

On December 31, 1984, the last teachers and students left and the school closed. The property was abandoned and it was not until 1986 that Marion County Board of Commissioners purchased the property with the intent to turn East Hall into a museum.

== Marion County Museum ==
East Hall is home to the Marion County Museum of History and Archaeology, which features antiques and artifacts of local history.
