= Middleton Tyas =

Village and civil parish in North Yorkshire, England

Coordinates: 54°26′51″N 1°39′03″W

- Location within North Yorkshire
- Population: 581 (2011)
- OS grid reference: NZ228057
- Unitary authority: North Yorkshire
- Ceremonial county: North Yorkshire
- Region: Yorkshire and the Humber
- Country: England
- Sovereign state: United Kingdom
- Post town: RICHMOND
- Postcode district: DL10
- Dialling code: 01325
- Police: North Yorkshire
- Fire: North Yorkshire
- Ambulance: Yorkshire
- UK Parliament: Richmond and Northallerton

Middleton Tyas is a village and civil parish in North Yorkshire, England, near Scotch Corner.

== History ==
The name Middleton is of Old English origin and means middle farm or middle settlement. Tyas is a Norman family name but there seems to be no evidence that Middleton Tyas once belonged to a family of that name.

The village lies on a substratum of limestone, which has been extensively quarried. Limestone quarrying still takes place at the nearby Barton roundabout. There was also an 18th-century copper mine and works near the village.

Just outside the village is the Middleton Lodge Estate. Middleton Lodge itself was built in 1760 and is a listed building. It also has a number of Grade II listed buildings and 200 acres (81 hectares) of parkland.

St Michael and All Angels' Church, Middleton Tyas lies just outside the village on the road towards Moulton. It is an ancient structure, with Norman arches and pillars on the north side and Early English on the south. It was restored and renovated between 1867 and 1879 under the direction of Sir George Gilbert Scott.

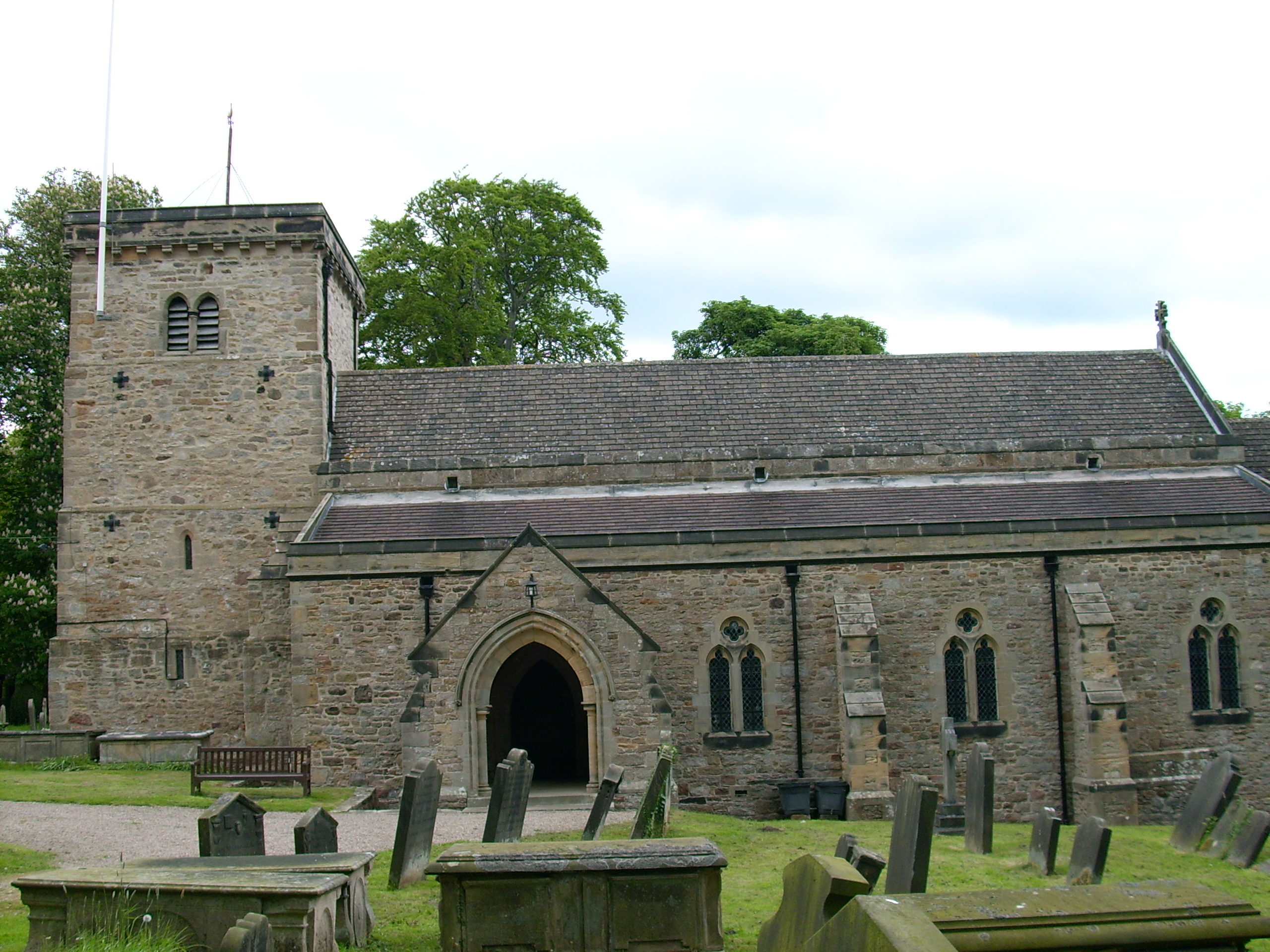
St Michael & All Angels, Middleton Tyas

A Primitive Methodist chapel was erected in the village in 1877; only three years later it was sold to the Wesleyans. It is no longer used as a church, having been closed down in 1984.

=== Notable people ===
The fraudster Sir Edmund Backhouse, 2nd Baronet, and his brother, the naval officer Roger Backhouse, were both born in the village. Lady Alicia Blackwood lived in the village, as did Arthur Francis Pease, who also died there. The two brothers Almroth Wright and Charles Theodore Hagberg Wright were born in the village. Top poker player Keith Hawkins currently lives in the village

== Amenities ==
There is one pub in the village, The Shoulder of Mutton; there is also The Scotch Corner Hotel at the famous roundabout.

The village is served by Middleton Tyas Church of England primary school, which moved from the Victorian building in the centre of the village to a new purpose-built building on the outskirts. The old school was built in 1861-62 and the new school in 2003–04. The old school was sold and is now being extensively refurbished.

The post office and shop closed in April 2003, leaving the village with no retail facilities within its boundaries, so the local community decided to open a new shop. Using grant aid from the Countryside Agency and DEFRA the villagers founded the Community Co-operative village store in the Memorial Hall. It was opened by the local MP, William Hague, in April 2004. The shop is open 55 hours a week and sells basic groceries, local produce, fruit and vegetables, newspapers and magazines; it has an in-store bakery and serves as an off-licence. There are two part-time staff and eight volunteers.

The nearby Scotch Corner Service Station acts as a useful 24-hour shop for Middleton Tyas and other neighbouring villages.

== Governance ==
The electoral ward with the same name stretches south-west to Skeeby and had a total population at the 2011 Census of 1,183.

From 1974 to 2023 it was part of the district of Richmondshire and since then has been administered by the unitary North Yorkshire Council.

== See also ==
- Listed buildings in Middleton Tyas
