= Listed buildings in Westow =

Westow is a civil parish in the county of North Yorkshire, England. It contains 21 listed buildings that are recorded in the National Heritage List for England. Of these, one is listed at Grade I, the highest of the three grades, two are at Grade II*, the middle grade, and the others are at Grade II, the lowest grade. The parish contains the village of Westow, the hamlets of Firby and Kirkham, and the surrounding countryside. Most of the listed buildings are houses, cottages and associated structures, and farmhouses, and the others include the ruins of a priory, a cross stump, a church, a bridge and a telephone kiosk.

== Key ==
Grade	Criteria
I	Buildings of exceptional interest, sometimes considered to be internationally important
II*	Particularly important buildings of more than special interest
II	Buildings of national importance and special interest

== Buildings ==
Name and location	Photograph	Date	Notes	Grade
Kirkham Priory; 54.08254°N 0.87663°W		12th century	The Augustinian priory, now in ruins, is in limestone and sandstone. The ruins consist of parts of a church, with associated monastic buildings to south, and a detached gatehouse to the northwest. The surviving parts of the monastic buildings include sections of the cloister, the refectory and the infirmary. The gatehouse is the most complete survival with two storeys and a wide arch, statues, two two-light windows on the upper storey, a panelled parapet, and a buttress with a pinnacle to the right.	I
Cross stump 54.08313°N 0.87846°W		14th century (probable)	The cross stump near the entrance to Kirkham Priory is in limestone. The base is carved with pairs of quatrefoils, on it is a stepped plinth, and the stump of a cross shaft with a square section.	II
St Mary's Church; 54.08483°N 0.84084°W		16th century	The oldest part of the church is the tower, the chancel was restored in 1862 by Ewan Christian, and parts of the body of the church were rebuilt in 1864. The porch was reconstructed in 1973 by George Pace. The church is built in limestone with a Westmorland slate roof, and consists of a nave, a south porch, a chancel with a north vestry, and a west tower. The tower has diagonal buttresses, and a blocked west doorway, above which are a three-light and a one-light window, string courses, two-light bell openings, and an embattled parapet.	II*
Chantry Cottage; 54.07797°N 0.84955°W	—	17th century	The house is in limestone with sprocketed eaves and a pantile roof. There are two storeys and three bays. On the front is a gabled porch, and the windows are sashes with timber lintels.	II
Kirkham Bridge; 54.08304°N 0.88013°W		17th century (or earlier)	The bridge carries a road over the River Derwent. It is in gritstone, and consists of one pointed arch and two segmental arches. It has cutwaters rising to refuges on the road, a band and a chamfered parapet.	II
Westow Hall; 54.07707°N 0.84901°W		Late 17th century	The house is in limestone, with rusticated quoins, a moulded eaves course, and a pantile roof with gable coping and shaped kneelers. There are two storeys and attics, seven bays, the middle bay projecting slightly, and two rear cross-wings. On the middle bay is a doorway with a Gibbs surround and a broken segmental pediment. The windows are sashes in architraves with keystones, the window above the doorway with pilasters. On the attic are seven dormers with casements and alternate triangular and segmental heads.	II*
Yew Tree Cottage; 54.07785°N 0.84946°W		Late 17th to early 18th century	The house is in limestone, with a stepped eaves course, sprocketed eaves and a pantile roof. There are two storeys and three bays. On the front are a doorway and sash windows, those on the upper floor horizontally sliding, breaking through the eaves course.	II
Grange House; 54.08290°N 0.83382°W	—	Early 18th century	A house and a byre to the left in limestone with pantile roofs. The house has two storeys, two bays, and sprocketed eaves. On the front is a doorway and horizontally sliding sash windows. The byre has a single storey, and has a doorway and a window.	II
Kirkham Manor Farmhouse; 54.08340°N 0.87836°W		Early to mid-18th century	The house is in sandstone, with a stepped eaves course, and a steeply pitched swept French tile roof with gable coping and shaped kneelers. There are two storeys, and an L-shaped plan, with a front range of five bays. On the front is a doorway, the windows are sashes, and all the openings have lintels with keystones. Flanking the middle window on the upper floor are carvings of monks.	II
Herbert Cottage; 54.07724°N 0.84866°W	—	Mid-18th century	A stable block to Westow Hall, later converted for residential use, it is in brick on the left and limestone on the right, with a dentilled eaves course and a pantile roof with gable coping. There are two storeys, four bays, and a later single-storey extension on the left. The doorway has a Gibbs surround, there is one casement window, and the other windows are sashes, those on the left part of the house with lintels and keystones.	II
High Farmhouse and byre 54.07762°N 0.84504°W		Mid-18th century	The house and byre to the left are in limestone, with sprocketed eaves, and pantile roofs with gable coping and shaped kneelers. The house has two storeys and three bays. The central doorway has a divided fanlight, and the windows are casements with wedge lintels and keystones. The byre has one storey, the front is blind and at the rear are two stable doors.	II
Fox and Hounds House; 54.07723°N 0.84736°W	—	Mid to late 18th century	The house is in limestone with a pantile roof. There are two storeys, three bays, and a cross-wing at the rear on the left. On the front, steps lead up to a doorway with a fanlight and a segmental head. The windows to the right of the door are sash window|sashes]] with wedge lintels, and those to the left are horizontally sliding sashes with segmental arches.	II
Manor Farmhouse; 54.07826°N 0.850256°W	—	Mid to late 18th century	The house is in limestone, with quoins, and a pantile roof with gable coping and shaped kneelers. There are two storeys, three bays, and a single-bay wing to the right. The central doorway has a divided fanlight, the windows on the main part are sashes with channelled wedge lintels and keystones, and on the wing is a casement window.	II
Barn northeast of Westow Hall; 54.07728°N 0.84841°W	—	Mid to late 18th century	The barn is in limestone, and has a pantile roof with gable coping. On the front facing the street is a blocked carriage arch under a cambered brick arch, and a blocked window. The front facing the yard has a stable door and slit vents, and on the gable end is a pitching door.	II
Blacksmiths Arms; 54.07834°N 0.84996°W		Late 18th century	Two houses, later a public house, in limestone on a plinth, with a pantile roof, gable coping and shaped kneelers. There are two storeys and four bays, and later rear extensions. On the front are two doorways with divided fanlights, the windows are sashes, and all the openings have channelled wedge lintels and keystones.	II
Corner House; 54.07757°N 0.84916°W	—	Late 18th century	The house is in limestone, and has a pantile roof with gable coping and shaped kneelers. There are two storeys and an attic, four bays, a cross-wing at the rear, and a former barn on the right with a single storey. The entry is at the rear, and on the front are sash windows with wedge lintels, and two dormers. The barn has two small openings and a blocked window.	II
Firby Hall; 54.08781°N 0.86298°W		Late 18th to early 19th century	A large house divided into flats in limestone, with a hipped Westmorland slate roof and a plain parapet with ball finials. There are two storeys, a main range of five bays, a projecting bay on the right, and a large rear cross-wing on the left. Steps lead to a porch on the main range with an elaborate shell hood, and on the cross-wing is a porch with a pediment. The windows are sashes, those on the ground floor with wooden wedge lintels each incorporating a blank shield.	II
Tarrs Cottages; 54.07745°N 0.84527°W		Late 18th to early 19th century	A row of four cottages with a wing of three cottages at right angles to the rear. They are in limestone, with sprocketed eaves and a pantile roof. There are two storeys and each cottage has one bay and a doorway. The windows are horizontally sliding sash windows, and the ground floor openings have wedge lintels.	II
Westow Grange; 54.07503°N 0.82586°W		Late 18th to early 19th century	The house is in limestone with a pantile roof. There are two storeys, three bays, and a rear cross-wing. The central doorway has a fanlight, and the windows are sashes. At the rear is a tall stair window.	II
Kirkham Hall; 54.08469°N 0.87616°W		1838–39	The house is in stone, with wide eaves on paired consoles, and a hipped Westmorland slate roof. There are two storeys and five bays, the outer bays projecting slightly. On the front is a French door, and the windows are sashes, those on the outer bays with architraves and triglyph friezes, over which are balustrades.	II
Telephone kiosk 54.07810°N 0.84976°W	—	1935	The telephone kiosk opposite the Post Office is of the K6 type designed by Giles Gilbert Scott. Constructed in cast iron with a square plan and a dome, it has three unperforated crowns in the top panels.	II
