= Church of St Mary, Westow =

Coordinates: 54°5′6″N 0°50′28″W

St Mary's Church
- Church of St Mary of the Moor
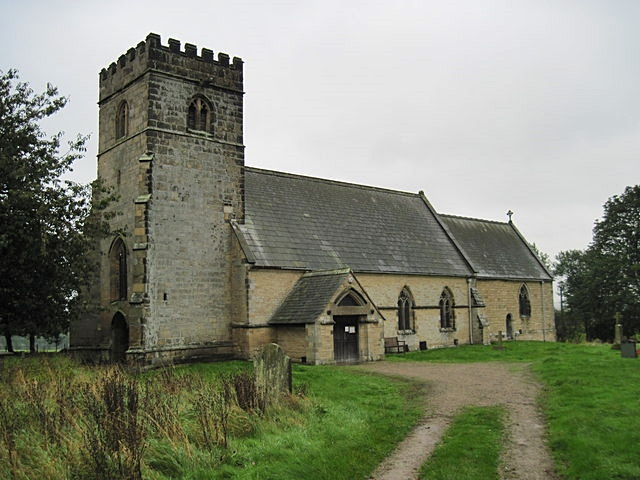
- St Mary's Church
- OS grid reference: SE 75931 66053
- Address: Church Lane, Westow, YO60 7NJ
- Country: England
- Denomination: Church of England

Architecture
- Architect(s): Mallinson and Healey
- Style: Early English Style
- Years built: 1860's

Administration
- Diocese: Diocese of York
- Parish: West Buckrose

Listed Building – Grade II*
- Reference no.: 1149059

St Mary's Church, also known as Church of St Mary of the Moor or St Mary ad mora is a church located in the village of Westow, North Yorkshire, England.

The church dates back to Norman times but was almost entirely rebuilt in the 1860s, at a cost of £1,400 (equivalent to £147,178 in 2025), with only the Norman tower remaining. The rebuilding largely made use of the original stone.

Inside of the church is a Norman water font, a cresset thought to have come from Kirkham Priory, and a memorial to George Montaigne, Squire of Westow, who fought on the Royalist side in the English Civil War.

In the church's graveyard, the former residents of Westow are buried on one side, those of Firby on another, and those of Menethorpe on another—as the church is roughly equidistant from each settlement.

== See also ==
- Grade II* listed churches in North Yorkshire (district)
- Listed buildings in Westow
