= Huttons Ambo railway station =

Disused railway station in North Yorkshire, England

Huttons Ambo
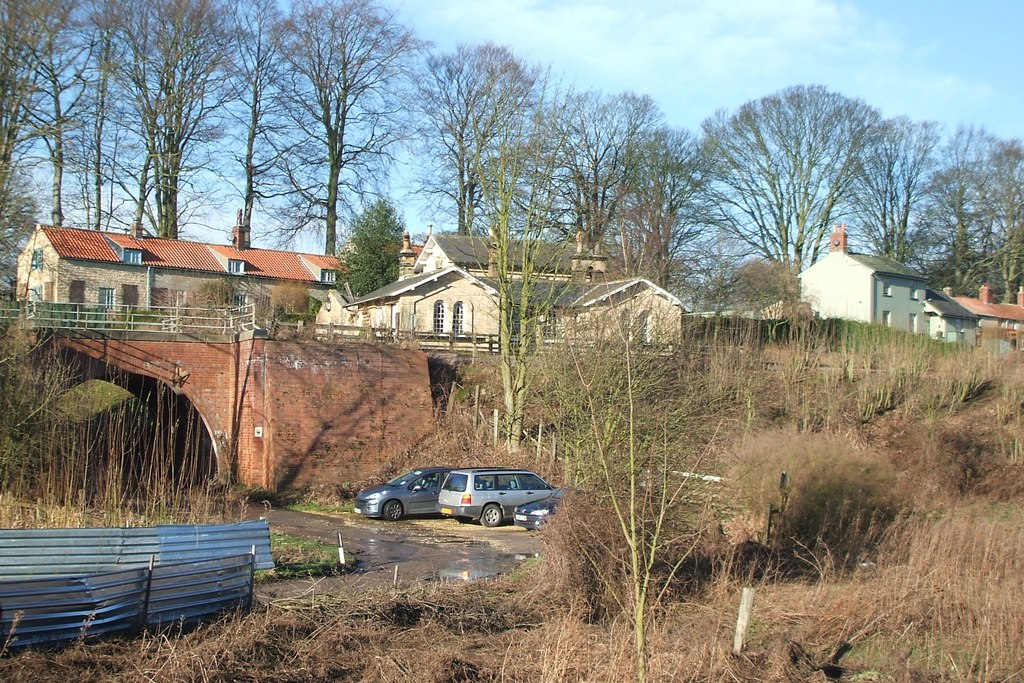
- Site of the former station in 2008

General information
- Location: High Hutton, Low Hutton and Menethorpe, North Yorkshire; England
- Coordinates: 54.100890°N 0.832310°W
- Grid reference: SE764678
- Platforms: 2

Other information
- Status: Disused

History
- Original company: York and North Midland Railway
- Pre-grouping: North Eastern Railway
- Post-grouping: London and North Eastern Railway

Key dates
- 5 July 1845: opened
- 22 September 1930: closed for regular passenger trains
Location

Huttons Ambo railway station was a minor railway station serving the twin villages of High Hutton and Low Hutton, and the village of Menethorpe, in North Yorkshire, England, on the York to Scarborough Line.

The villages were previously known as Hutton on the Hill and Hutton on Derwent. They were coupled together in 1589 (Yorkshire Fines, Tudor, m., p. 107).

The station was opened on 5 July 1845 by the York and North Midland Railway. It closed to regular passenger traffic in 1930. The last station master was Mr Ken Collinson. The station was originally just named Hutton, but was renamed Huttons Ambo on 1 February 1885.

At one time, mathematician Karl Pearson's grandfather was stationmaster here, and John Cariss was porter.

In 1913, legislation was passed for a narrow gauge railway to Burythorpe, but this was never implemented.

Preceding station	Historical railways	Following station
Castle Howard; Station closed; Line open	Y&NMR; York to Scarborough Line	Malton
