= Blacksmiths Arms =

Blacksmiths Arms may refer to:

- Blacksmiths Arms, Broughton Mills, a pub in Cumbria, England
- Blacksmiths Arms, Cloughton, a pub in North Yorkshire, England
- Blacksmiths Arms, Westow, a pub in North Yorkshire, England
