= Kirkham Abbey railway station =

Disused railway station in North Yorkshire, England

Kirkham Abbey
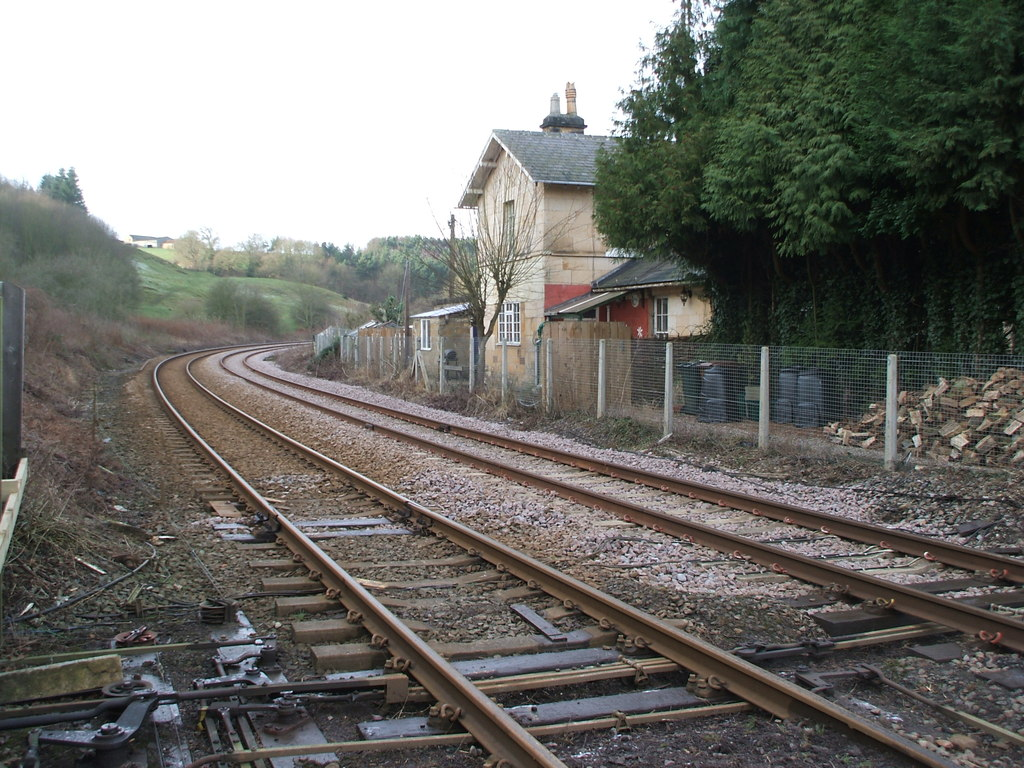
- Site of the former station in 2008

General information
- Location: Kirkham, North Yorkshire; England
- Coordinates: 54.082395°N 0.880813°W
- Grid reference: SE733657
- Platforms: 2

Other information
- Status: Disused

History
- Pre-grouping: York and North Midland Railway; North Eastern Railway (UK)
- Post-grouping: London and North Eastern Railway

Key dates
- 5 July 1845: opened
- 22 September 1930: closed
Location

Kirkham Abbey railway station was a minor railway station serving the village of Kirkham in North Yorkshire, England on the York to Scarborough Line and was opened on 5 July 1845 by the York and North Midland Railway. It closed on 22 September 1930.

The station was across the River Derwent from Kirkham, and thus in the neighbouring parish of Whitwell-on-the-Hill. It was originally just named Kirkham, but the 'Abbey' suffix was added on 1 June 1875, to take into account the proximity of the ruins of Kirkham Priory.

Preceding station	Historical railways	Following station
Howsham; Station closed; Line open	Y&NMR; York to Scarborough Line	Castle Howard; Station closed; Line open
