= Maurice of Kirkham =

Maurice of Kirkham (died after 1174) was an English Augustinian canon, Christian Hebraist and theologian. His dates are uncertain. He was serving as the prior of Kirkham when he wrote the Latin treatise Contra Salomitas (Against the Salomites) in the years 1169–1177.

== Sources ==
Maurice's life and very existence are known only through the sole surviving copy of the long version of Contra Salomitas in a 15th-century manuscript (now Oxford, Bodleian Library, MS Hatton 92). A short version of the same treatise is found in a 12th-century manuscript (now Oxford, Lincoln College, MS Lat. 27), but this copy identifies its author only by the initial M. In the Hatton manuscript, Contra Salomitas is accompanied by a letter addressed by Maurice to his archbishop, Roger de Pont L'Évêque (r. 1154–1181), and by an exchange of rhyming verses between the two. Further evidence of Maurice's dates comes from his references to Bishop Bartholomew of Exeter (r. 1161–1184) and Cuthbert, prior of Gisborough before 1184.

== Life ==
According to his own account, Maurice was 65 years old when he wrote to Archbishop Roger shortly after 1171. This would place his birth around 1107–1109. He studied Hebrew for three years in his youth and copies of some Hebrew psalters that had belonged to Archbishop Gerard of York (r. 1100–1108), which he claims won the admiration of the Jews of York.

Maurice succeeded Prior Geoffrey sometime between 1148 and 1153. At the time of his letter to Archbishop Roger, he had been at Kirkham for 53 years. In that correspondence, he reveals that he had raised the issue of the Salomite heresy at the Council of Tours convoked and attended by Pope Alexander III in 1163 and a little earlier at a local council in Northampton.

That Maurice died after 1174 may be implied by his reference to Bernard of Clairvaux as a saint (sanctus), since Bernard was canonzied in that year. He was succeeded as prior by Drogo, who died between 1188 and 1191.

It has been suggested that the Maurice to whom Walter Daniel dedicated his Life of Ailred of Rievaulx shortly after 1167 may be the prior of Kirkham. Walter wrote seeking information about Ailred, who had become abbot of Rievaulx in 1147. Rievaulx had been founded in 1132 by Walter Espec, who had earlier founded Kirkham in 1121.

== Works ==
Contra Salomitas is addressed to Gilbert of Sempringham, who died in 1189. It refers to a previous letter sent by Maurice to Gilbert. It is divided into a prologue and five chapters. The longer version appears to be later than the shorter.

Contra Salomitas was written to refute the Salomites, who claimed that Saint Anne, the mother of the Virgin Mary, was married three times and that her third husband was the disciple known from the gospels as Salome. To refute this view, he cites numerous authorities, including such early writers as Josephus and the fathers Irenaeus, Polycrates and Hegesippus, whom he knew through Eusebius. He recognized Hegesippus as "older than all of these" and asserted that he had met James, brother of Jesus. His most important source, however, is Jerome's Adversus Helvidium. Maurice was a careful and attentive reader, correctly distinguishing the Isidore who wrote Liber de ortu et obitu patriarcharum from Isidore of Seville.

Maurice uses his Hebrew learning to show that the name Salome is feminine, that its masculine equivalent is Solomon and that, like English names, it is not declined. According to M. R. James, "indubitably Prior Maurice was on the side of truth and common sense."

In his letter to Archbishop Roger, Maurice sought to correct a misunderstanding. In the exchange of "very bad Latin rhymes", Roger recognizes his error.

== Bibliography ==
- Burton, Janet E. (1995). Kirkham Priory from Foundation to Dissolution. Borthwick Publications.
- James, M. R. (1934). "The Salomites". The Journal of Theological Studies. 35 (139): 287–297. JSTOR 23965086.
- Mews, Constant J.; Ijäs, Antti, eds. (2024). Salome and the Kin of Jesus: The Treatises of Maurice of Kirkham and Herbert of Bosham. Pontifical Institute of Mediaeval Studies.
- Naydenova-Slade, Mellie; Park, David (2008). "The Earliest Holy Kinship Image, the Salomite Controversy, and a Little-Known Centre of Learning in Northern England in the Twelfth Century". Journal of the Warburg and Courtauld Institutes. 71: 95–119. doi:10.1086/JWCI20462778.
