= Welburn-on-Derwent =

Village and civil parish in North Yorkshire, England

Coordinates: 54.1029°N 0.8991°W

Welburn
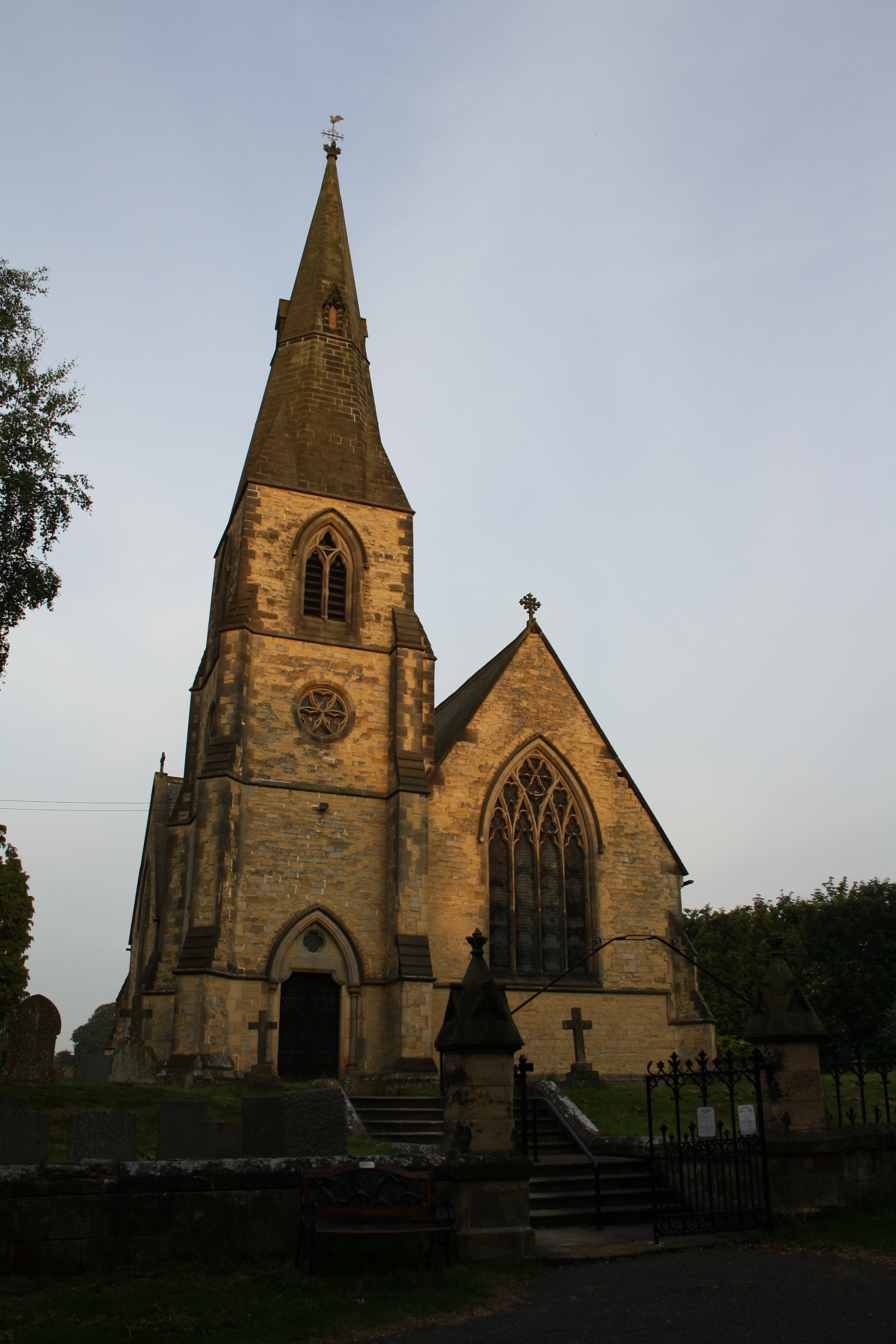
- St John the Evangelist

- Location within North Yorkshire
- Population: 516 (2011 census)
- OS grid reference: SE720680
- Civil parish: Welburn
- Unitary authority: North Yorkshire
- Ceremonial county: North Yorkshire
- Region: Yorkshire and the Humber
- Country: England
- Sovereign state: United Kingdom
- Post town: YORK
- Postcode district: YO60
- Dialling code: 01653
- Police: North Yorkshire
- Fire: North Yorkshire
- Ambulance: Yorkshire
- UK Parliament: Thirsk and Malton

Welburn is a village and civil parish in North Yorkshire, England, on the north bank of the River Derwent. It lies on the edge of the Howardian Hills, near to the stately home Castle Howard. It is about 14 miles from York and 5 miles south-west of Malton/Norton. It is a popular area for walkers and bird-watchers. The parish's population was estimated at 523 people in 2013. This figure includes the developments at Crambeck, Holmes Crescent and Chestnut Avenue that are some distance outside the heart of the village.

It is a traditional village in regards to its linear structure. The Main Street has two main offshoots; one lane, to the south, is called Church Lane (formerly Bank Lane) and leads to St John the Evangelist Church, built in 1858, to the newly built Village Hall, and to a small area of housing, mostly constructed in the 1960s. The lane leading northwards is called Water Lane, a short section of road serving two properties and over a small stream to farmland. Main Street continues south-eastwards of the village centre as Chestnut Avenue to join the main A64 road to Malton and York.

Welburn was part of the Ryedale district from 1974 to 2023. It is now administered by the unitary North Yorkshire Council.

It has one school, Welburn Community School, in the centre of the village. It also has a pub, the Crown & Cushion, which provides a centre for the village and Four and Twenty Blackbirds, village bakery and café. Welburn is one of the few villages in the area that still has a red telephone box (located near the centre of the village); they are becoming an increasing rarity in North Yorkshire.

The parish council of the area is based at Welburn Village Hall. It has elected members from Welburn and Crambeck, an adjoining settlement. Crambeck, formerly a reformatory school, was used in the Roman period times as the site of a pottery. The Roman ceramic produced here is known as Crambeck Ware. The recently redeveloped Village Hall, operational since May 2007, is used for a range of activities and groups in the village and the surrounding area. These groups include the Women's Institute, horticultural society, indoor bowling club, country dancing, Local History Group, Wine Club and an Art & Craft club. The eco-friendly Village Hall is a gathering place for villagers and local walkers.

== Castle Howard railway station ==
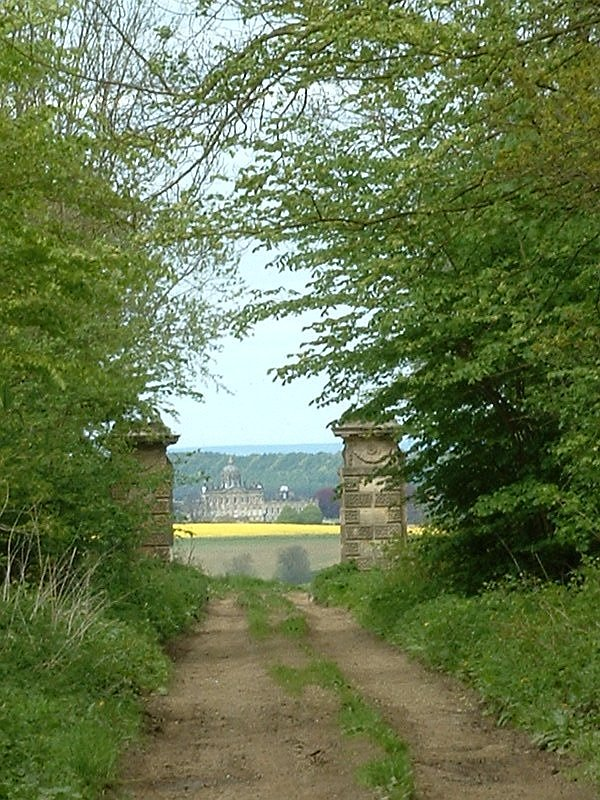
A view of Castle Howard through The Exclamation Gates, from the old road built for Queen Victoria

Near Crambeck there is a disused railway station called Castle Howard railway station. It is on the York to Scarborough Line and was opened 1845 with closure to passengers in 1930, although the line is still open. A road was built from the station to the stately home. It was decommissioned and became a public road in the early 1900s.

Visitors arriving by road approached from a different direction along a road that offered a spectacular view over to the great house. The view was framed by the 'Exclamation Gates', so called due to the responses that they would elicit from astonished visitors. The columns, which are grade II listed, can still be seen to the west of the village, heading towards Whitwell-on-the-Hill.

== Castle Howard ==
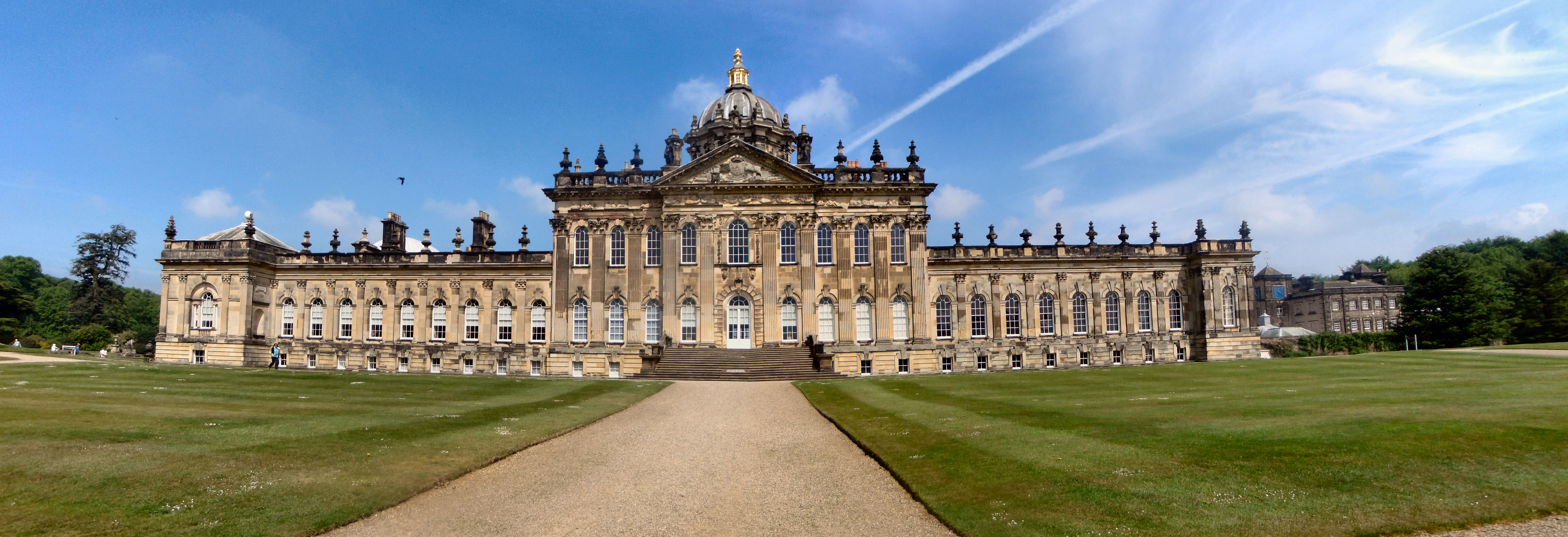
Castle Howard - Garden Side

Located 3.8 miles from the centre of Welburn lies one of Englands finest historic houses, Castle Howard. The house with its 1,000 acre grounds was designed by Sir John Vanbrugh for the 3rd Earl of Carlisle 300 years ago. Today it is a visitor site attracting families and dog-walkers. It is also used to hold wedding receptions and formal events. The profits made that are generated from tourists and visitors help towards the restoration and conservation of 200 listed monuments and buildings that surround the estate. Within these large grounds other amusements have been built to generate money, such as a local farm shop with butchers selling a selection of meat sourced locally from the Castle Howard estate. There is also a coffee shop, courtyard café, bookshop, carriage house shop and a garden centre all selling local produce and items.

== Religious sites ==
Welburn's parish church is St John the Evangelist, it is an ecclesiastical parish formed from the Bulmer, Yorkshire ancient parish. The church was built from 1859 to 1865 and has been designated as a grade II listed building. It is an Anglican Christian church within the church of England that is used by the residents of Welburn and Crambeck. Services are held each Sunday, but the church is open daily for prayer and private meditation.

== Community ==
Welburn's village hall is run by local volunteers from the community of Welburn and Crambeck. The volunteers manage the facility for the use of local communities, residents and friends of Welburn. Regular events are held in Welburn's village hall such as art groups, parish council meetings, zumba classes, horticultural society, wine club, country dancing and many other various events.

The Crown and Cushion pub changed its after Queen Victoria travelled through the station on her way to castle Howard.

== Transport ==
The main road connecting the area of Welburn is the A64. This main road starts at Leeds and runs through York, up to Welburn and continues through ending at Scarborough. The closest railway station to Welburn is located within Malton approximately 7 miles (11 km) north-east of Welburn. However, there is a frequent bus service local from Welburn. This calls at Bulmer, Castle Howard, Claxton, Flaxton, Foston, High Hutton, Hopgrove, Low Hutton, Malton, Sandhutton, near Thirsk, Sheriff Hutton, Thornton-le-Clay, West Lilling and York.

== Climate ==
Welburn is situated within the North East England climate range. Its climate is influenced by the locations Eastern and Western boundaries. The high altitude of the nearby Pennines results in a wet, dull, frequently cool environment. The Pennines also casts a 'rain shadow' throughout the area that mixes with the prevailing westerly winds. The North sea also contributes to the climate as it exerts a moderate control on coastal areas in which it keeps summer conditions relatively cool. The average temperature of Welburn depend upon the altitude and its proximity to the coast. Temperature shows a diurnal and seasonal variation. January is usually the coldest month with daily temperatures varying from −0.5 °C on the highest ground to 1.5 °C along the coast in the area of South Yorkshire. The lowest known temperature recorded in the region was in Houghall near Durham, which is located approximately 70.4 miles from Welburn. The temperature recorded was −21.1 °C on 5 January 1941. The summer months are considerably warmer, especially the months of July and August with a mean daily temperature ranging from 21 °C in the South of Yorkshire, to a temperature of 16 °C or less in areas situated in the higher Pennines. The highest known temperature for this region was in August 1990, with temperatures of 33 °C caused by several heatwaves. Average annual sunshine durations over the region of North East England range from 1500 hours along the coast to less than 1250 hours in the higher Pennines, this also explains the temperature range due to the difference in altitudes.

== Parish plan ==
Welburn's parish plan was created for the rural community to contribute their ideas within their local society. The parish plan included funding access to help a range of organisations including local planning authorities, government agencies and the police services during a period of five years.

== Occupational structure ==
The graph to the right shows Welburn's occupational census data for 1881. Welburn's job sector was mainly in agriculture as can be seen from the graph. Although a lot of employment shows as 'Persons without specific data' and 'Unknown occupation' within the graph the known data portrays that the majority of occupations within the Welburn area were involved in the agriculture sector. If compared to the recent 2011 Census data for Welburn, it can be seen that an extremely small proportion of people currently work in the agriculture sector. As society has changed it seems most economically active residents are working within the retail and wholesale job sector.

== Education ==
Welburn Community Primary School is located within a large rural area containing communities such as Welburn, Barton Hill, Crambeck, Crambe, Whitwell, Bulmer, The Castle Howard Estate and Barton Le Willows. The main part of the school was built in 1841. The newest part of the school building was an extension erected in 2004. Welburn Community Primary School has approximately sixty pupils within the school.

== Notable people ==
- Richard Spruce, English botanist and explorer.
- Darren Dunning, footballer
- James Martin, celebrity chef

== See also ==
- Listed buildings in Welburn-on-Derwent
