= Kirkham Bridge =

Historic structure in Kirkham, North Yorkshire, England

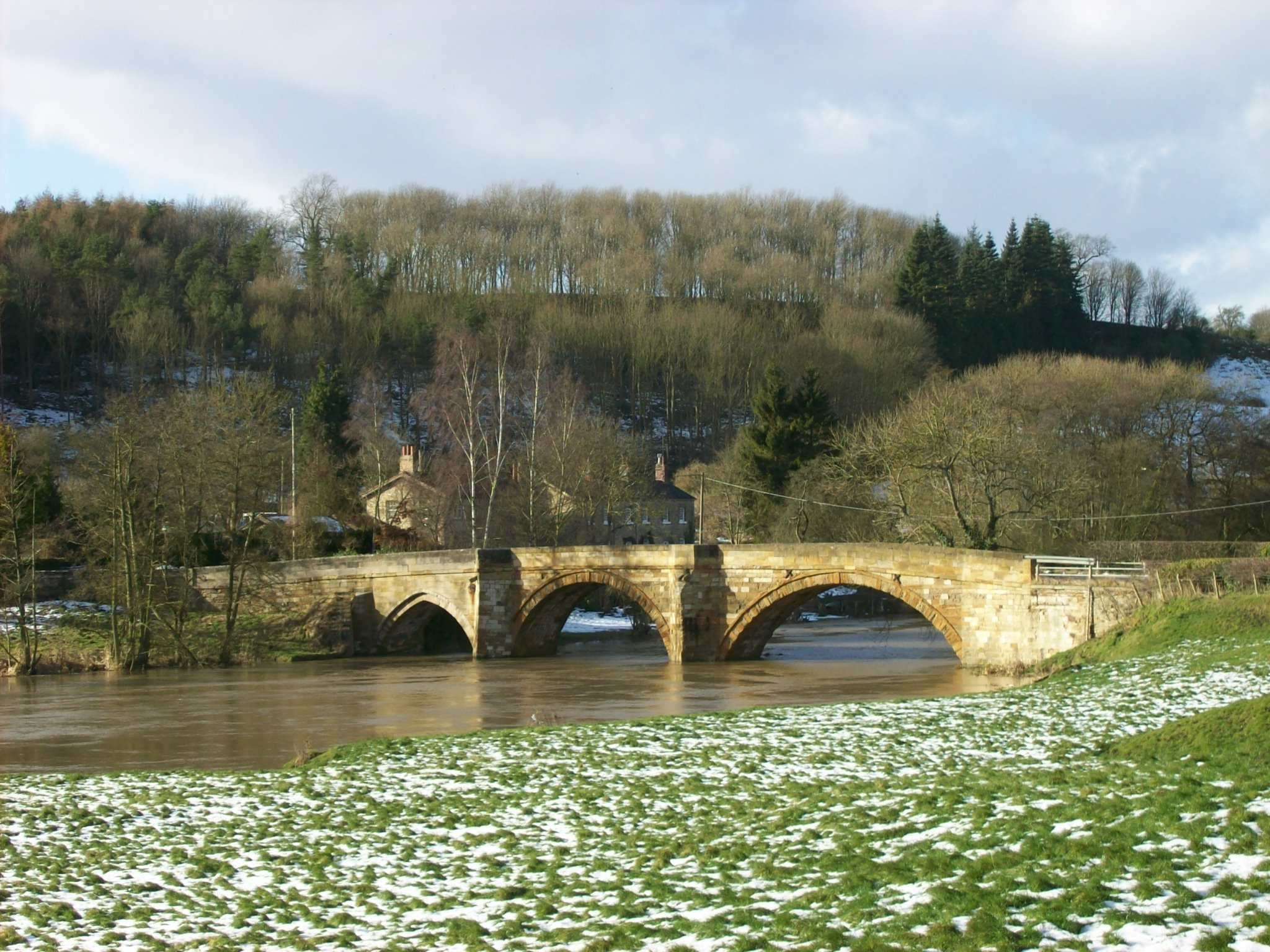
- The bridge in 2014

- Location within North Yorkshire

General information
- Location: Kirkham, North Yorkshire, England
- Coordinates: 54°04′59″N 0°52′48″W
- Year built: 1806
- Renovated: 2018 (repaired)

Design and construction
- Architect: John Carr

Listed Building – Grade II
- Official name: Kirkham Bridge
- Designated: 10 October 1966
- Reference no.: 1149117

Kirkham Bridge is a historic structure in Kirkham, North Yorkshire, a village in England.

A bridge over the River Derwent at the site was first recorded in 1444, and was also mentioned by John Leland. The current bridge was built in 1806, to a design by John Carr, perhaps including some earlier work in the north arch. The structure was Grade II listed in 1966. In 2014, the parapet was damaged by a heavy goods vehicle, and such vehicles were later banned from using the bridge until it was repaired and resurfaced, in 2018.

The bridge is built of gritstone, and consists of one pointed arch and two segmental arches. It has cutwaters rising to refuges on the road, a band and a chamfered parapet. It spans a total of 40 yards (37 m) and is 11 feet (3.4 m) wide.

== See also ==
- Listed buildings in Westow
