= Blacksmiths Arms, Westow =

Pub in North Yorkshire, England

Blacksmiths Arms
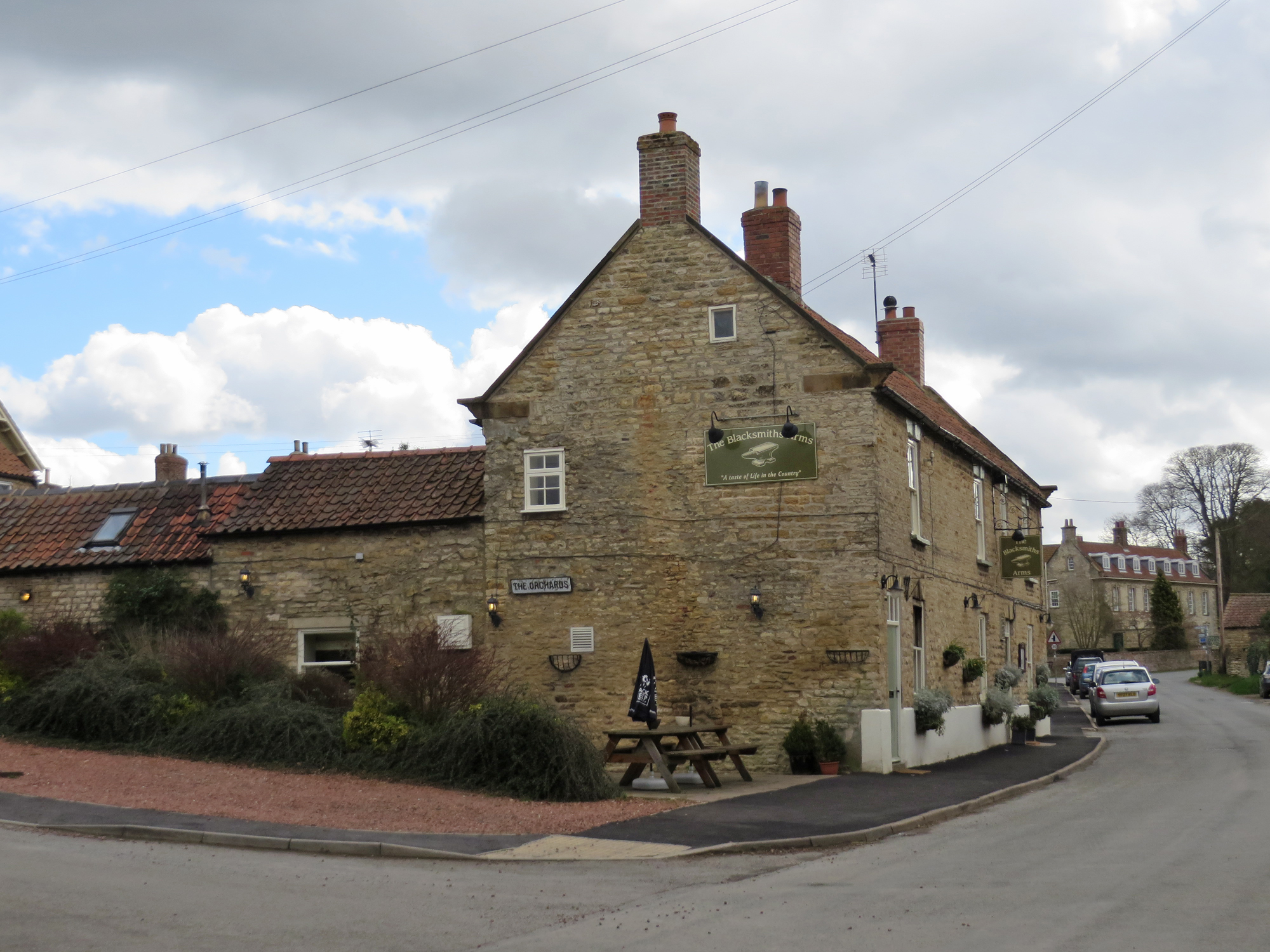
- The pub in 2014

- Location within North Yorkshire
- Former names: Blacksmiths Inn

General information
- Type: Public house
- Location: Main Street, Westow, North Yorkshire, England
- Coordinates: 54.0783°N 0.8499°W
- Year built: Late 18th century
- Renovated: 20th century (added)

Website
- blacksmithswestow.com

Listed Building – Grade II
- Official name: Blacksmiths Arms
- Designated: 11 February 1987
- Reference no.: 1316016

The Blacksmiths Arms is a historic pub on Main Street in Westow, a village in North Yorkshire, England.

The building was constructed in the late 18th century, as two houses. They were later merged and converted into a pub, and in the 20th century it was extended to the rear. The building was Grade II listed in 1987. In the 2000s, its name was briefly changed to the "Blacksmiths Inn", but it closed and then reopened in November 2009, under its original name.

The pub is built of limestone on a plinth, with a pantile roof, gable coping and shaped kneelers. It has two storeys and is four bays wide, and has later rear extensions. On the front are two doorways with divided fanlights, the windows are sashes, and all the openings have channelled wedge lintels and keystones. Inside, there is a large fireplace.

== See also ==
- Listed buildings in Westow
