= Menethorpe =

Hamlet in Malton, North Yorkshire, England

Coordinates: 54.098862°N 0.82626006°W

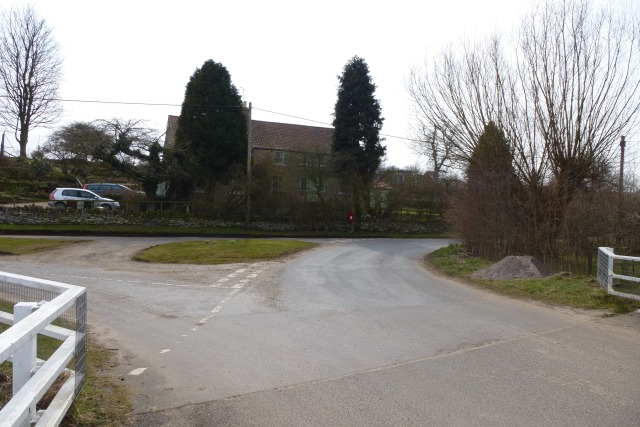

- Location within North Yorkshire
- Civil parish: Burythorpe
- Unitary authority: North Yorkshire
- Ceremonial county: North Yorkshire
- Region: Yorkshire and the Humber
- Country: England
- Sovereign state: United Kingdom
- Police: North Yorkshire
- Fire: North Yorkshire
- Ambulance: Yorkshire

Menethorpe is a hamlet and former civil parish, now in the parish of Burythorpe, in North Yorkshire, England. In 1931 the parish had a population of 68. It is about 2.5 miles (4 km) from Malton.

== History ==
The name "Menethorpe" means 'Men(n)ing's outlying farm/settlement'. Menethorpe was recorded in the Domesday Book as Mennistorp. Menethorpe was formerly a township in the parish of Westow and from 1866 was a civil parish in its own right. On 1 April 1935, the parish was abolished and merged with Burythorpe.

Until 1974, it was historically part of the East Riding of Yorkshire. Between 1974 and 2023 it was part of the Ryedale district. It is now administered by North Yorkshire Council.

The remains of the abandoned medieval village Menethorpe are visible as cropmarks and earthworks on aerial photographs.
