= Crown & Cushion =

Pub in Welburn-on-Derwent, North Yorkshire, England

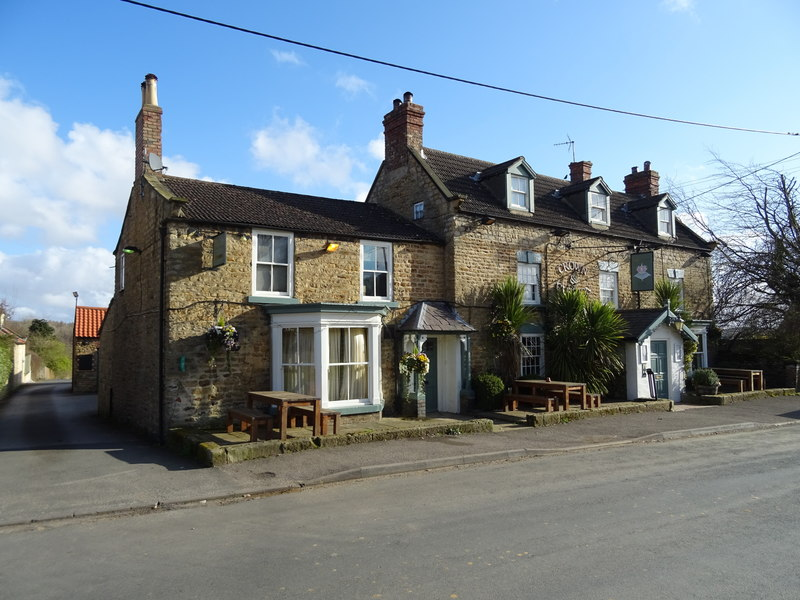
- The pub in 2020

- Location within North Yorkshire

General information
- Type: Public house
- Location: Village Street, Welburn-on-Derwent, North Yorkshire, England
- Year built: Early 19th century
- Renovated: Late 19th century (altered)

Website
- Official website

Listed Building – Grade II
- Official name: The Crown and Cushion
- Designated: 25 April 1986
- Reference no.: 1149499

The Crown & Cushion is a historic pub on Village Street in Welburn-on-Derwent, a village in North Yorkshire, England.

The pub was built in the early 19th century and was altered late in the century. The roof was replaced in the 20th century. The building was Grade II listed in 1986. In 2013, the pub was purchased by Provenance Inns, which refurbished it at a cost of £1 million. In 2015, it launched a series of friendship lunches to counter loneliness. In 2020, it was named as the most dog-friendly pub in Yorkshire.

The pub is built of sandstone, and has tile roofs with coped gables and shaped kneelers. The main block has two storeys and attics and three bays, and to the left is a lower wing with two storeys and two bays. In the centre of the main block is a rendered gabled porch with bargeboards, a slate roof and a finial, and to the right is a canted bay window. The other windows are sashes with flat arches of voussoirs, those on the upper floor with keystones, and in the attic are three gabled dormers. The wing has a porch on the right, a canted bay window to its left, and sash windows.

== See also ==
- Listed buildings in Welburn-on-Derwent
