= Listed buildings in Welburn-on-Derwent =

Welburn-on-Derwent is a civil parish in the county of North Yorkshire, England. It contains 24 listed buildings that are recorded in the National Heritage List for England. All the listed buildings are designated at Grade II, the lowest of the three grades, which is applied to "buildings of national importance and special interest". The parish contains the villages of Welburn-on-Derwent and Crambeck, and the surrounding countryside. Most of the listed buildings are houses and associated structures, and farmhouses, and the others include two pairs of gate piers, a bridge, a public house, a former railway station and station house, a former reading room, a church and a telephone kiosk.

== Buildings ==
Name and location	Photograph	Date	Notes
Pair of gate piers, Hardy Flatts; 54.08997°N 0.89194°W		Early to mid-18th century	The gate piers flank an entrance to the Castle Howard estate. They are in sandstone with vermiculated panels. The piers are about 3 metres (9.8 ft) in height on chamfered plinths. Each pier has a cornice and a moulded pyramidal cap.
White Gate; 54.09833°N 0.90007°W		Early to mid-18th century	The gate piers flank an entrance to the Castle Howard estate. They are in sandstone with a square plan, and are about 4 metres (13 ft) in height. Each pier has vermiculated long and short quoins forming alternate bands of rustication to the front and back. There are shallow pilasters on each side, an impost band with Greek key moulding, a frieze with a floral swag in high relief, scrolled consoles, an overhanging cornice, and a low cap.
Manor House and steps 54.10260°N 0.89774°W		Mid to late 18th century	The house is in sandstone, with a raised plinth band, quoins, a stepped eaves course, and a pantile roof with coped gables and shaped kneelers. There are two storeys and a basement, and three bays. A flight of steps leads up to the central doorway that has a divided fanlight. The windows on the ground floor are sashes, in the basement and upper floor they are horizontally sliding sashes, and all the openings have raised surrounds and lintels with keystones.
Chanting Hill Farmhouse; 54.10279°N 0.89730°W		Late 18th century	The farmhouse is in sandstone with quoins and a Roman tile roof. There are two storeys and three bays, and a rear wing. The central doorway has a divided fanlight, above it is a pivoting window, and the other windows are horizontally sliding sashes. All the windows have painted tripartite lintels.
Mount Pleasant Farmhouse; 54.09187°N 0.88372°W	—	Late 18th century	The farmhouse is in sandstone with a pantile roof. There are two storeys, a double depth plan and three bays, and a lower two-bay wing to the right. In the centre is a projecting gabled porch with a doorway in the return, and the windows in the main part are sashes with painted wedge lintels and keystones. On the wing are horizontally sliding sash windows and a gabled half-dormer. At the rear is a doorway with a fanlight.
Rosedale House; 54.10271°N 0.89846°W	—	Late 18th century	The house is in sandstone, whitewashed on the front, with quoins, a stepped eaves course, and a slate roof with coped gables. There are two storeys, three bays, and rear wings. In the centre is a doorway with a raised surround, a divided fanlight, and a keystone carved with a head. Above it is a recessed round-arched panel containing a date, with imposts and a keystone carved with a head. The outer bays contain sash windows with raised surrounds and keystones, those in the ground floor triple.
Temperance Inn Farmhouse; 54.10316°N 0.89961°W	—	Late 18th century	An inn, later a farmhouse, in sandstone, rendered on the front, with a pantile roof, coped gables and shaped kneelers. There are two storeys and an attic, three bays and a rear lean-to. The central doorway has a divided fanlight, the windows are sashes, and all have painted wedge lintels and keystones. On the attic are three gabled dormers with plain bargeboards.
The Grange; 54.10253°N 0.89694°W	—	Late 18th century	The house is in sandstone with a stepped eaves course and a slate roof. There are two storeys, three bays, and two parallel rear wings. The doorway has a fanlight, above doorway is a blocked opening, the windows are sashes, and all the openings have tripartite wedge lintels.
Woodview; 54.10317°N 0.90063°W	—	Late 18th century	The house is in sandstone with a pantile roof. There are two storeys and two bays. The doorway is in the centre, and the windows are horizontally sliding sashes. The ground floor openings have painted wedge lintels, and those above have timber lintels.
Crambeck Bridge; 54.09822°N 0.87583°W		1785	The bridge carries the A64 road over the valley of Cam Beck, it was designed by John Carr, and was widened in 1935. It is in sandstone, and consists of nine round arches on tall piers with imposts. The bridge has voussoirs, a band under a parapet with flat coping, and pilaster buttresses at the ends.
Rose Cottage; 54.10317°N 0.89978°W	—	1791	The house is in sandstone, with paired modillion eaves, and a pantile roof with coped gables and shaped kneelers. There are two storeys and two bays, and an outshut. The central doorway has a dated triple keystone, and the windows are sashes with flat arches and keystones.
Elm Tree House and Pigeon Cote Farmhouse; 54.10325°N 0.90011°W	—	Late 18th to early 19th century	A pair of houses in sandstone with pantile roofs. Elm Tree House is the earlier, and has two storeys and two bays, and a coped gable and shaped kneeler on the left. The doorway is in the centre, the windows are sashes, and all the openings have flat arches of painted chiselled voussoirs. Pigeon Cote Farmhouse to the right dates from the late 19th century. It has one storey and an attic and one bay. The windows are horizontally sliding sashes, on the attic is a gabled dormer, and the entrance is in the right gable end.
Holly Bank; 54.10304°N 0.90302°W	—	Late 18th to early 19th century	The house is in sandstone and has a pantile roof. There are two storeys, two bays, and a rear extension. The doorway is in the centre, above it is a square recessed panel, and the windows are horizontally sliding sashes. The ground floor openings have tooled wedge lintels, and those on the upper floor have thin timber lintels.
Pear Tree House and outbuilding 54.10300°N 0.89878°W		Late 18th to early 19th century	The house is in sandstone with a modillion eaves course and a pantile roof. There are two storeys and three bays, a rear extension, and a single-storey three-bay outbuilding on the right. The central doorway has a patterned fanlight, above it is a blind window, and the other windows are sashes. All the openings have painted flat arches of voussoirs. The outbuilding contains a stable door and two fixed-light windows.
Chapel Garth; 54.10287°N 0.89973°W	—	Early 19th century	The house is in sandstone, and has a pantile roof with coped gables and shaped kneelers. There are two storeys and three bays. The central doorway has a fanlight, above it is a round-arched window with voussoirs, imposts and a keystone. The other windows are sashes with flat arches of voussoirs.
Cherry Tree House; 54.10276°N 0.89906°W	—	Early 19th century	The house is in sandstone, and has a pantile roof with coped gables and shaped kneelers. There are two storeys and an attic, and two bays. The central doorway has a divided fanlight, the windows are sashes, and all the openings have wedge lintels. On the attic are two gabled dormers with bargeboards.
Pitcairn; 54.10291°N 0.89991°W	—	Early 19th century	The house is in sandstone with a pantile roof. There are two storeys and two bays. The central doorway has a divided fanlight, the windows are sashes, and all the openings have flat arches with keystones.
The Crown and Cushion; 54.10310°N 0.89923°W		Early 19th century	The public house is in sandstone, and has tile roofs with coped gables and shaped kneelers. The main block has two storeys and attics and three bays, and to the left is a lower wing with two storeys and two bays. In the centre of the main block is a rendered gabled porch with bargeboards, a slate roof and a finial, and to the right is a canted bay window. The other windows are sashes with flat arches of voussoirs, those on the upper floor with keystones, and on the attic are three gabled dormers. The wing has a porch on the right, a canted bay window to its left, and sash windows.
Yew Tree House, railings and gates 54.10263°N 0.89824°W	—	Early 19th century	The house is in sandstone with a slate roof. There are two storeys and three bays, and a rear extension. The central doorway has a divided fanlight, the windows are sashes, and all the openings have painted wedge lintels. In front are railings and two garden gates, about 1 metre (3 ft 3 in) in height, on a low stone plinth. They consist of spearhead railings and spiral standards with urn finials.
Station House and Platform Cottage; 54.09095°N 0.87507°W		1845	Originally Castle Howard railway station and the station house, later a house and a cottage, designed by G. T. Andrews, it is in sandstone with quoins and slate roofs. The house has two storeys and an entrance front of three bays, with a full-height central portico, and sash windows. To the rear right is a station range, and to the rear left is a service range. The line side front is gabled, and has an upper floor balcony on ogee corbels, with a Venetian-style screen, a keystone and a pierced balustrade. The station range to the right has a round-arched arcade with an impost band and keystones.
Reading room 54.10298°N 0.89844°W		Mid-19th century (probable)	The former reading room is in sandstone on a plinth, with quoins, a raised eaves band, and a slate roof with coped gables and shaped kneelers. There is a single storey and three bays, and a single-bay outbuilding on the left containing a doorway with a tripartite lintel. The original doorway in the centre of the main part has been replaced by a sash window with a raised surround and a triple keystone, and the flanking windows are similar. Above the central window is a clock, a memorial to the First World War, with an inscribed keystone, and on the roof is a timber bellcote with the clock bell.
St John's Church; 54.10080°N 0.89826°W		1859–60	The church is built in sandstone and has a slate roof. There is a cruciform plan, consisting of a nave, north and south transepts, a chancel with a southeast vestry, and a northwest steeple. The steeple has a tower with three stages, buttresses, a west doorway with a pointed hood mould, string courses, roundels in the middle stage, two-light bell openings with hood moulds, and a broach spire with lucarnes, a weathervane and a cross.
Welburn Lodge; 54.09426°N 0.88202°W		c. 1860	The house is in sandstone with quoins and a slate roof. There is one storey and an attic, and a front of two bays. The left bay contains a gabled cross-wing and on the right is a lean-to. On the left return is a gabled timber framed porch on a sandstone plinth. On the front is a four-light canted bay window with chamfered mullions and transoms, to the right is a half-dormer, and on the lean-to is a round-arched window. At the rear are three-light mullioned and transomed windows under two relieving arches.
Telephone kiosk 54.10312°N 0.90018°W		1935	The telephone kiosk opposite Pigeoncote Farm is of the K6 type designed by Giles Gilbert Scott. Constructed in cast iron with a square plan and a dome, it has three unperforated crowns in the top panels.
