= Westow Hall =

Historic building in Westow, North Yorkshire, England

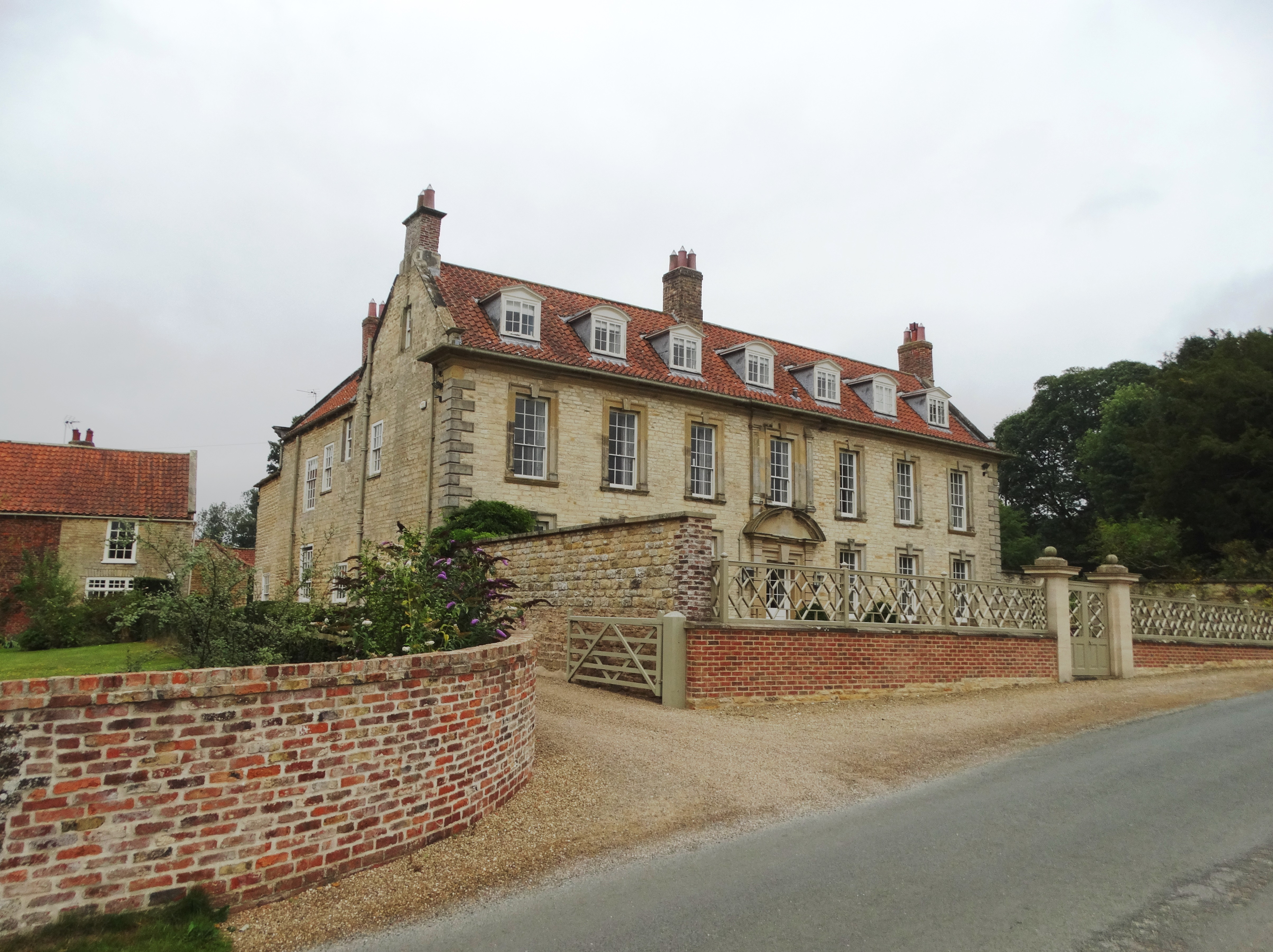
- The building in 2025

- Location within North Yorkshire

General information
- Type: Country house
- Location: Henlow Lane, Westow, North Yorkshire, England
- Coordinates: 54°04′37″N 0°50′56″W
- Year built: 17th century
- Renovated: 20th century (remodelled)

Listed Building – Grade II*
- Official name: Westow Hall
- Designated: 20 September 1951
- Reference no.: 1175258

Listed Building – Grade II
- Official name: Herbert Cottage
- Designated: 11 February 1987
- Reference no.: 1295374

Westow Hall is a historic building on Henlow Lane in Westow, a village in North Yorkshire, England.

The country house was built in about 1690, and was remodelled in the 20th century. It was Grade II* listed in 1951.

The house is built of limestone, with rusticated quoins, a moulded eaves course, and a pantile roof with gable coping and shaped kneelers. It has two storeys and attics, and is seven bays wide, the middle bay projecting slightly. It also has two rear cross-wings. On the middle bay is a doorway with a Gibbs surround and a broken segmental pediment. The windows are sashes in architraves with keystones, the window above the doorway with pilasters. On the attic are seven dormers with casements and alternate triangular and segmental heads. Inside, there are two historic carved wooden fireplaces and an open string staircase. On the gable end is an early Sun Insurance plaque.

The former stable block was constructed in the mid-18th century and later converted into a house named Herbert Cottage. It is built of brick on the left and limestone on the right, with a dentilled eaves course and a pantile roof with gable coping. There are two storeys, four bays, and a later single-storey extension on the left. The doorway has a Gibbs surround, there is one casement window, and the other windows are sashes, those on the left part of the house with lintels and keystones. It is Grade II listed.

== See also ==
- Grade II* listed buildings in North Yorkshire (district)
- Listed buildings in Westow
