= St John's Church, Welburn =

Church in Welburn-on-Derwent, North Yorkshire, England

Coordinates: 54.1009°N 0.8984°W

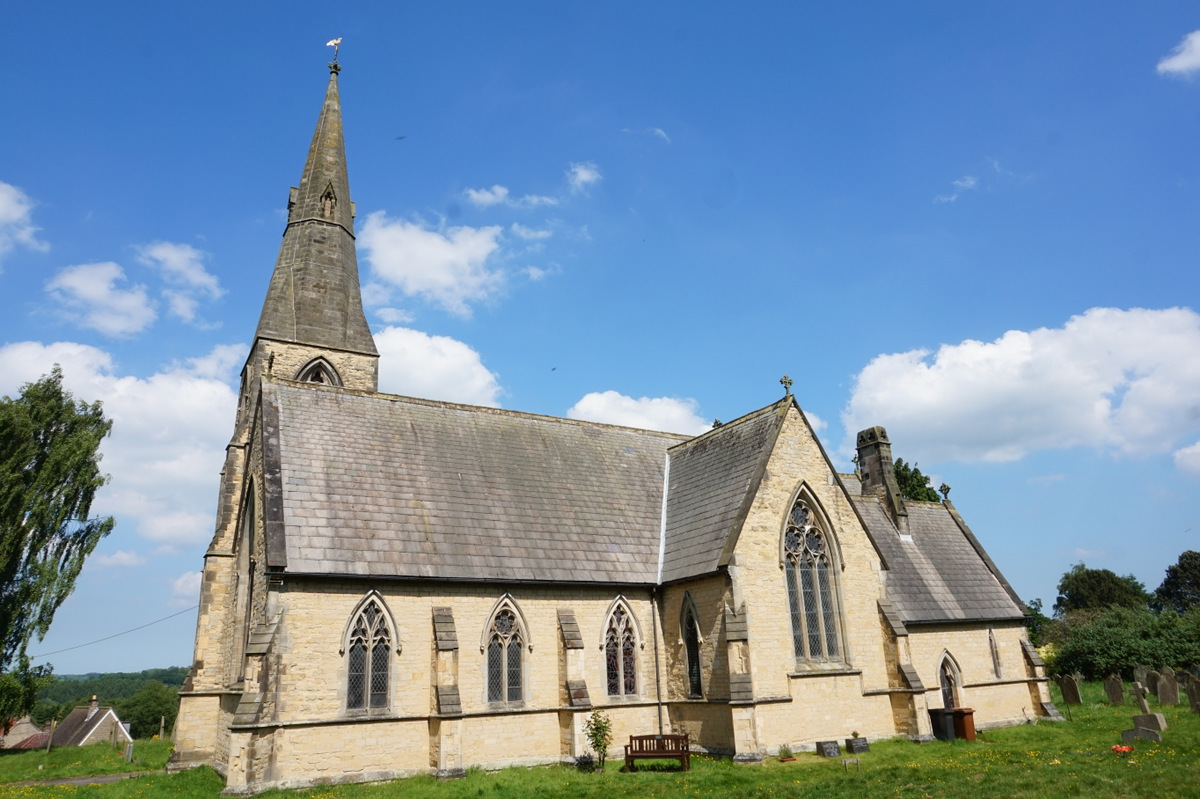
The church, in 2017

St John's Church is the parish church of Welburn-on-Derwent, a village in North Yorkshire, in England.

Welburn was historically in the parish of St Martin's Church, Bulmer. A church was built between 1859 and 1865, with funding from George Howard, 7th Earl of Carlisle, in memory of his mother, Georgiana Howard. It was designed in the Early English style by James Mallinson and Thomas Healey, and was constructed at a cost of £2,000. Stained glass was inserted in the west window in 1866, in memory of the 7th Earl. The building was grade II listed in 1966.

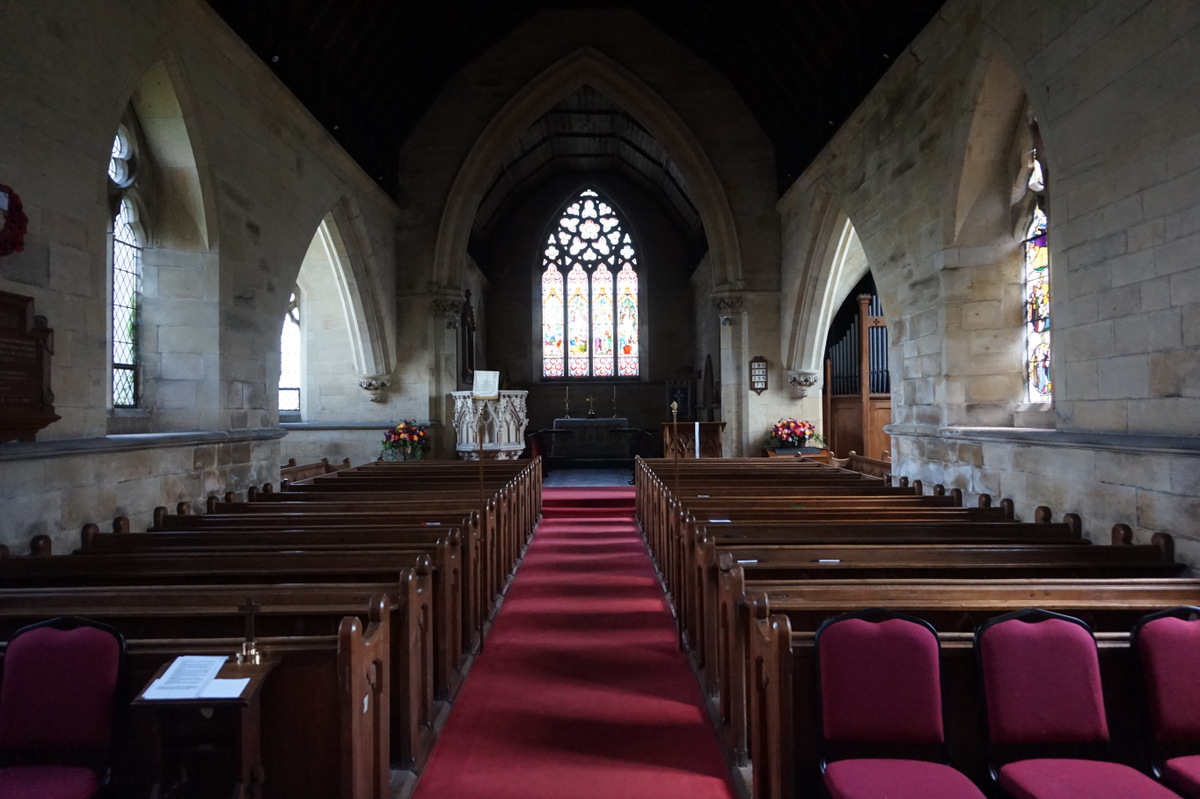
View east inside the church

The church is built of sandstone and has a slate roof. It has a cruciform plan, consisting of a nave, north and south transepts, a chancel with a southeast vestry, and a northwest steeple. The steeple has a tower with three stages, buttresses, a west doorway with a pointed hood mould, string courses, roundels in the middle stage, two-light bell openings with hood moulds, and a broach spire with lucarnes, a weathervane and a cross. The original fittings survive inside, while the east window has stained glass by Hardman & Co.

== See also ==
- Listed buildings in Welburn-on-Derwent
