= Vacarius =

12th-century Italian canon lawyer in England

Vacarius (1120–1200?) was an Italian authority in civil and canon law who was known to author the Liber pauperum which between the years 1190 and 1220 influenced the development of legal studies in the University of Oxford. According to Gervase of Canterbury, Vacarius became the first known teacher of Roman law in England.

== Life ==
Vacarius was educated in and taught in Bologna from around 1140-1145. He was then brought to Canterbury, possibly by Thomas Becket, to serve as counsel to the archbishop of Canterbury, Theobald of Bec, in a struggle with Henry of Blois, Bishop of Winchester. The case ended favorably for Theobald in 1146. Vacarius next surfaces in 1149, when he taught, at Oxford, to crowds of those wealthy and those not. For the latter, he prepared a nine-volume compendium of the Codex Justinianus. The book was reputed to resolve all of the legal questions commonly debated in the schools, and became a leading textbook in the emerging university. Often described as the Liber pauperum, the book gave rise to the nickname pauperistae for students of law in Oxford. Nearly complete manuscripts of this work survive in the cathedral libraries at Worcester and Prague, and in the town library at Bruges. Fragments can be found in Oxford's Bodleian Library and in several of the college libraries at Oxford.

Despite its popularity, the new legal texts were not without opposition. King Stephen of England (who was not only king, but also a brother of Henry of Blois) silenced Vacarius, and ordered the destruction of the books of civil and canon law that Theobald had brought over from Italy with Vacarius. This royal edict seems to have been abandoned, however, after Stephen's death in 1154, and evidence suggests that civil law was soon again a favorite subject at Oxford. By 1190, two students from Friesland divided the evening between them to make a copy of the Liber pauperum.

It remains unknown whether Vacarius resumed his lectures after their interruption. In the same year that Stephen died, Vacarius's old friend Roger de Pont L'Evêque was promoted to the position of archbishop of York. Roger had invited Vicarius to join him in the north as legal adviser and ecclesiastical judge, and his name appears frequently in both papal letters and the chronicles of the period, indicating that he served in this capacity. For his services, he was rewarded with a prebend in the collegiate church of secular canons at Southwell. In 1191, he was allowed to cede half to his nephew Reginald. Vacarius is last heard of in 1198, when he and the prior of Thurgarton were commissioned by Pope Innocent III to fulfill a letter referring to crusades.

In addition to his legal work, surviving manuscripts attest to Vacarius' deliberations on other matters as well, likely in the latter half of his life. One of these, the Summa de assumpto homine, deals with the humanity of Christ, while the other, Summa de matrimonio, is a legal argument about the nature of marriage, in which he disputes both Gratian and Peter Lombard.

It is to Vacarius that we owe most of the information that has come down to us about Speroni, a heretic from Piacenza.
