= Listed buildings in Burythorpe =

Burythorpe is a civil parish in the county of North Yorkshire, England. It contains 10 listed buildings that are recorded in the National Heritage List for England. All the listed buildings are designated at Grade II, the lowest of the three grades, which is applied to "buildings of national importance and special interest". The parish contains the village of Burythorpe and the surrounding countryside. The listed buildings consist of houses, farmhouses, cottages, a barn, two bridges and a church.

== Buildings ==
Name and location	Photograph	Date	Notes
Thornthorpe Manor House; 54.09408°N 0.80253°W	—	Early 17th century	The house is in limestone, with quoins, and a swept pantile roof. There are two storeys and three bays. The windows are mixed, with some casement and some sashes, one horizontally-sliding.
3 and 4 Yew Tree Cottages; 54.07289°N 0.79271°W	—	17th or early 18th century	A pair of cottages that were extended in the 19th century. They are whitewashed, on stone in the earlier part, and on brick in the later part. There are two storeys and four bays. In the ground floor of No. 4 are two doorways, one blocked, and casement windows, all with channelled lintels. In No. 3 are a doorway with a cambered brick arch, and two casement windows, one with a channelled lintel, and the other with a brick relieving arch. The upper floor contains two-light horizontally-sliding sash windows.
Eddlethorpe Kennels Farm Barn; 54.08834°N 0.81369°W	—	18th century	The barn is in limestone, with brick quoins, a brick eaves course, and a hipped pantile roof. There are two storeys and seven bays. In the ground floor are two doorways with chamfered surrounds, a stable door with a Gibbs surround, and an opening in an architrave, all with keystones. The openings in the upper floor all have keystones, apart from one that has been enlarged to form a pitching door.
The Manor House; 54.07329°N 0.79191°W	—	1765	The house, incorporating a granary, is in sandstone, with sprocketed eaves, and a pantile roof with gable coping and shaped kneelers. There are two storeys, three bays, the former granary to the right, and a rear porch. The house has one window with a fixed light, and the other windows are casements with stone lintels and keystones.
5, 6 and 7 Yew Tree Cottages; 54.07273°N 0.79277°W	—	Mid to late 18th century	A row of three cottages in whitewashed stone, with a pantile roof, coped gables and shaped kneelers. There are two storeys and five bays. In the ground floor are horizontally-sliding sash and casement windows under segmental brick arches, and the upper floor contains two-light horizontally-sliding sashes.
Mount Farmhouse; 54.07205°N 0.79349°W	—	Late 18th century	The farmhouse is in sandstone, with sprocketed eaves, and a pantile roof with coped gables and shaped kneelers. There are two storeys, three bays and a later outshut on the right. The central doorway has a fanlight, and above it is a mock window. The other windows are sashes, those in the ground floor with keystones.
Thornthorpe Bridge; 54.09386°N 0.79972°W		Late 18th century	The bridge carries a road over Thornthorpe Beck. It is in stone with a brick soffit to the arch, and consists of a single segmental arch. The bridge has a band, a plain coped parapet, and drums at the ends.
Walgate House; 54.07220°N 0.79236°W	—	Late 18th to early 19th century	The house is in brick, with limestone at the rear, a stepped eaves course, and a pantile roof. There are two storeys and three bays. The doorway has a fanlight, and the windows are sashes with flat brick arches.
All Saints' Church; 54.07533°N 0.79573°W		1858	The church is in limestone with a Welsh slate roof, and is in Gothic Revival style. It consists of a four-bay nave with a south porch, and a single-bay chancel with a north vestry. The west front has angle buttresses, and a central buttress carrying a gabled bellcote, flanked by trefoil-headed lancet windows. The porch has a pointed arch with a moulded surround. In the nave are paired lancet windows, and at the east end are stepped lancets with a cinquefoil above.
Suspension Bridge; 54.09961°N 0.83153°W		1886	The suspension bridge carries a footpath over the River Derwent. It consists of wrought iron piers carrying round arches, with steel cables supporting a wooden walkway with a handrail.
