= All Saints' Church, Burythorpe =

Church in Burythorpe, North Yorkshire, England

Coordinates: 54°04′31″N 0°47′45″W

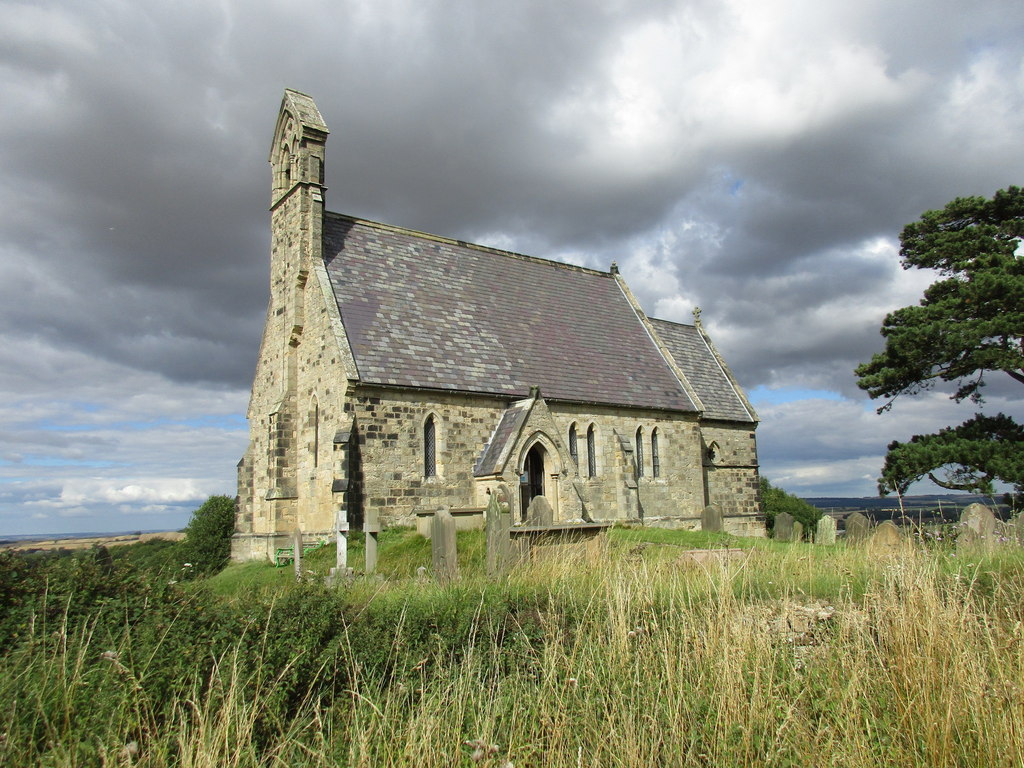
The church, in 2015

All Saints' Church is the parish church of Burythorpe, a village in North Yorkshire, in England.

The church sits on top of a hill, west of the village, with views in all directions. The first church on the site was Mediaeval, described in 1848 as "an ancient edifice with substantial buttresses". It was demolished in the 1850s and replaced by a new building, designed by John Bownas and William Atkinson. The building was Grade II listed in 1966.

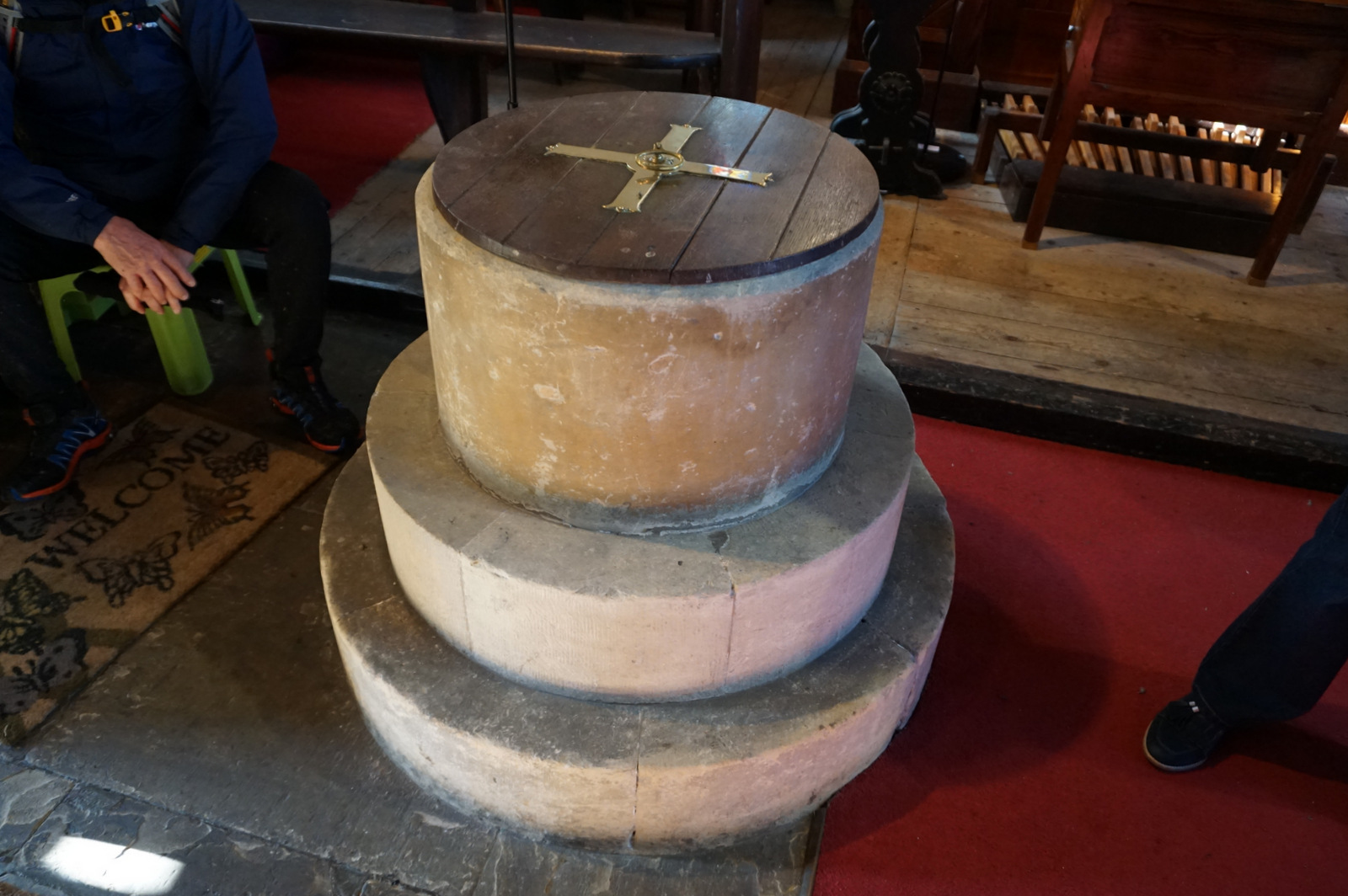
The font

The church is built of limestone with a Welsh slate roof, and is in the Gothic Revival style. It consists of a four-bay nave with a south porch, and a single-bay chancel with a north vestry. The west front has angle buttresses, and a central buttress carrying a gabled bellcote, flanked by trefoil-headed lancet windows. The porch has a pointed arch with a moulded surround. In the nave are paired lancet windows, and at the east end are stepped lancets with a cinquefoil above. Inside the church is a 12th-century tub font and two marble wall tablets from the 1850s. The east window, contemporary with the church, was designed by Alexander Gibbs.

== See also ==
- Listed buildings in Burythorpe
