= Castle Howard railway station =

Disused railway station in North Yorkshire, England

Castle Howard
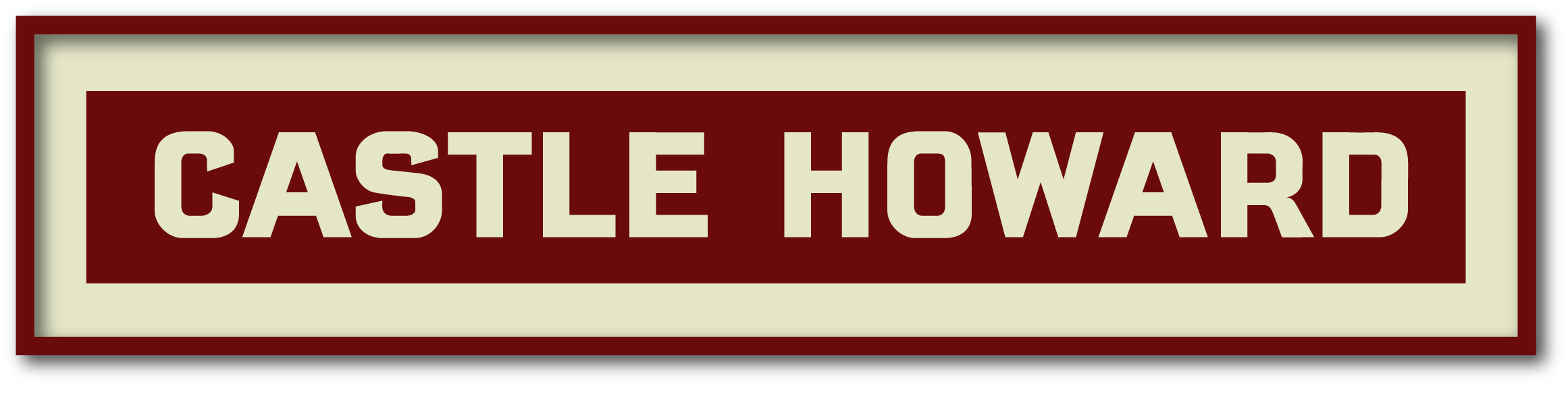
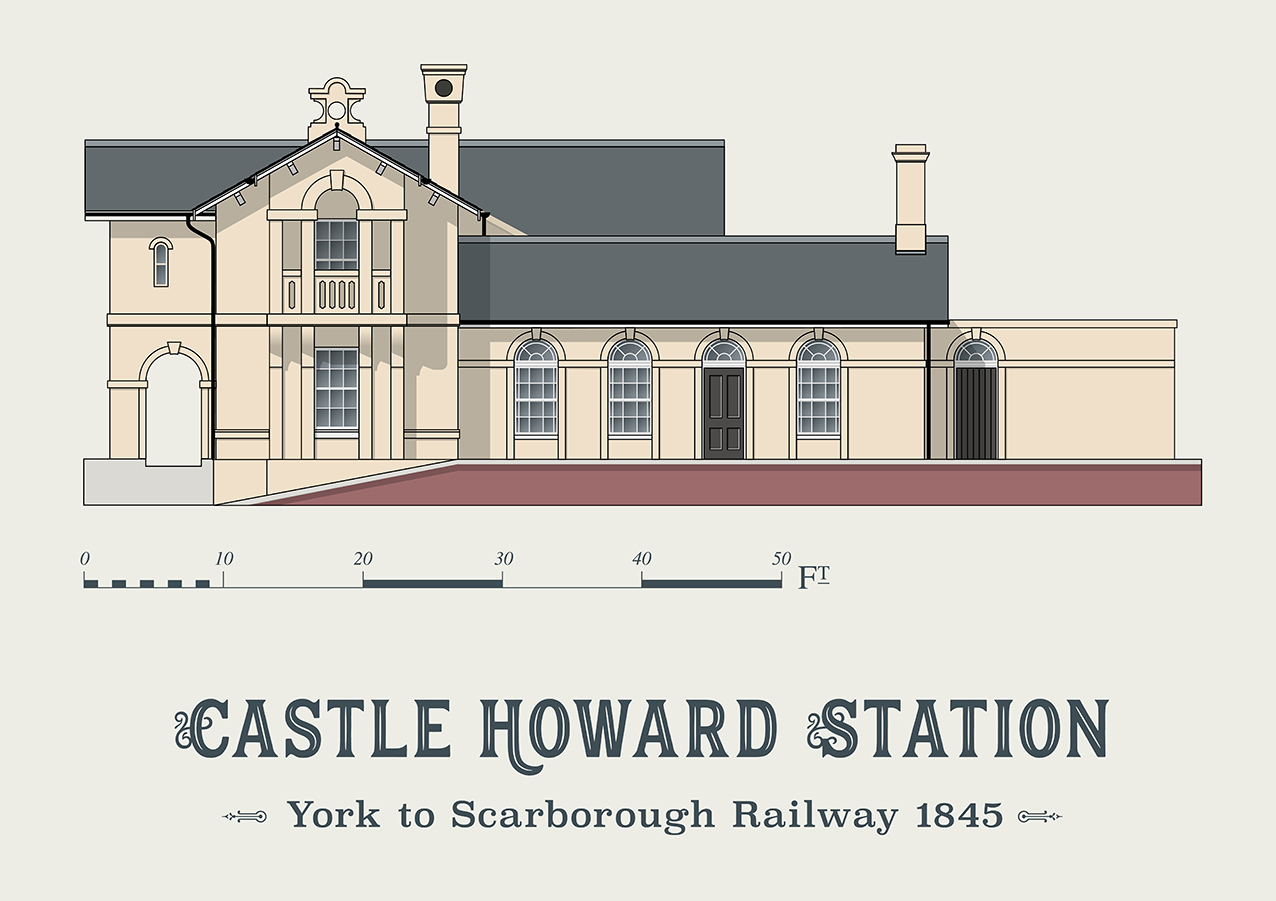
- Accurate digital replication of original sign Castle Howard Station Lineside Elevation Drawing

General information
- Location: Welburn, North Yorkshire; England
- Coordinates: 54.091000°N 0.874880°W
- Grid reference: SE736667
- Platforms: 2

Other information
- Status: Disused

History
- Opened: 5 July 1845
- Closed: 22 September 1930
- Pre-grouping: York and North Midland Railway; North Eastern Railway (UK)
- Post-grouping: London and North Eastern Railway
Location

Castle Howard railway station was a minor railway station serving the village of Welburn and the stately home at Castle Howard in North Yorkshire, England. On the York to Scarborough Line it was opened on 5 July 1845 by the York and North Midland Railway. The architect was George Townsend Andrews. It closed to passenger traffic on 22 September 1930 but continued to be staffed until the 1950s for small volumes of freight and parcels.

The station was often used by the aristocracy, notably Queen Victoria when she visited Castle Howard, with Prince Albert, as a guest of the Earl of Carlisle in August 1850. The station is now a private residence.

Castle Howard station was featured in the British TV documentary The Architecture the Railways Built presented by historian Tim Dunn on Yesterday in 2020.

== See also ==
- Listed buildings in Welburn-on-Derwent

| Preceding station | Historical railways | Following station |
|---|---|---|
| Kirkham Abbey; Station closed; Line open | Y&NMR; York to Scarborough Line | Huttons Ambo; Station closed; Line open |
