= Westow =

Village and civil parish in North Yorkshire, England

Coordinates: 54°04′40″N 0°50′54″W

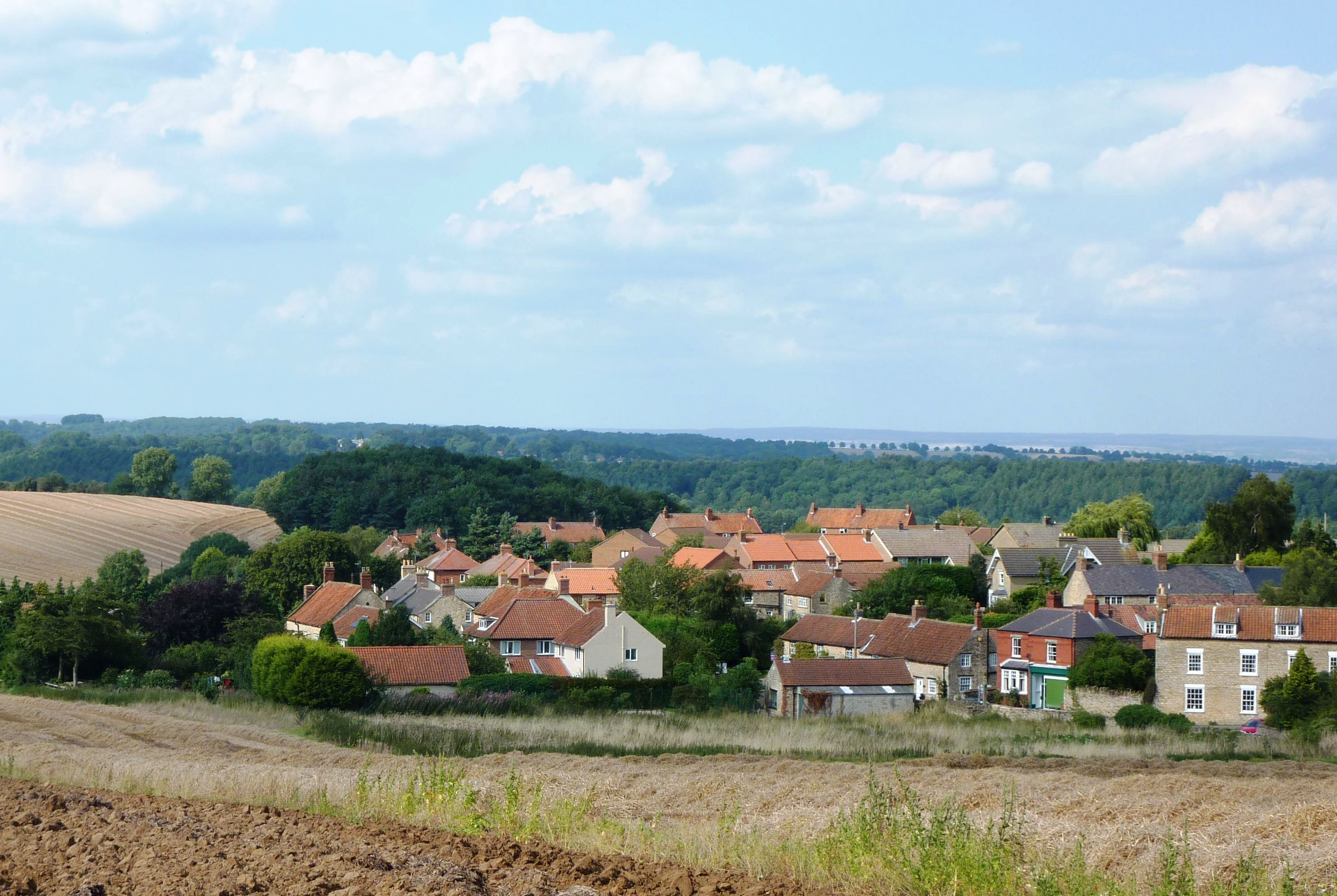
- Westow village

- Location within North Yorkshire
- Population: 339 (2011 census)
- OS grid reference: SE753652
- Civil parish: Westow
- Unitary authority: North Yorkshire
- Ceremonial county: North Yorkshire
- Region: Yorkshire and the Humber
- Country: England
- Sovereign state: United Kingdom
- Post town: York
- Postcode district: YO60
- Police: North Yorkshire
- Fire: North Yorkshire
- Ambulance: Yorkshire
- UK Parliament: Thirsk and Malton

Westow is a village and civil parish in North Yorkshire, England. Westow is situated in the lee of Spy Hill, bordering the Howardian Hills Area of Outstanding Natural Beauty, 3 miles (4.8 km) from the A64 road linking Leeds to the East Coast, 5 miles (8 km) west of the town of Malton, and 15 miles (24 km) east of the city of York.

The village was within the historic boundaries of the East Riding of Yorkshire until 1974. From 1974 to 2023, it was part of the Ryedale district. It is now administered by North Yorkshire Council.

The civil parish also includes the hamlets of Firby and Kirkham. The population of the civil parish was 339 in the 2011 Census. Neighbouring villages are Crambe, Whitwell-on-the-Hill, Welburn, Howsham, Leavening and Burythorpe.

There are parish records in Westow dating back to the 16th century, and archeological evidence of human settlement in the area has been found dating back to the celts.

The name Westow likely derives from West Howe, meaning hill.

== Buildings ==
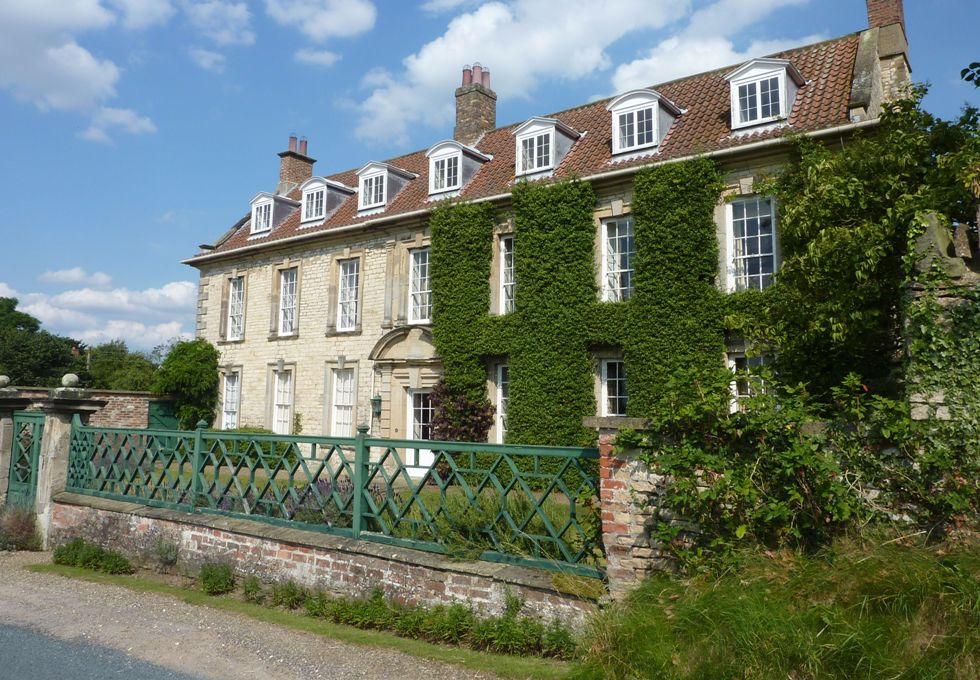
Westow Hall

The oldest part of Westow village lies within a conservation area and is south of the village pub, along 'Main Street'. Property predominantly comprises detached, semi-detached and terraced houses and cottages, finished in traditional locally quarried oolite limestone, with red pan-tile roofs.

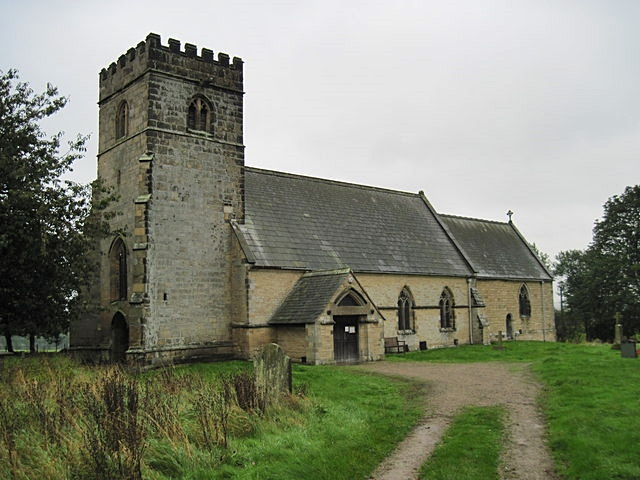
Church of St Mary

There are fifteen Historic England listed properties in Westow. These include Westow Hall, a 17th-century house which was the residence of the 4th and 5th Baron Grimthorpe.

The Church of St Mary, Westow, is a Norman church constructed with limestone rubble and ashlar – most of the church was demolished with only the tower remaining, and it was rebuilt on a much smaller scale, using the original stone, in the 1860s.

== Second World War ==
During the Second World War, Kirkham Priory in Kirkham was used for large scale trials of D-Day vehicles by the British Army and was visited secretly by Winston Churchill and King George VI.

Women's Land Army (WLA) civilians were billeted in Westow to do agricultural work.

Many evacuees from Hull, which was heavily bombed during the Second World War, were housed in Firby Hall and in Westow.

Bombs were dropped close to Firby Hall by a German aircraft. In October 1942 a German Aircraft (Junkers Ju 88A from 7/KG4) was hit by ground defence fire during a low level attack on Driffield aerodrome. It crash landed on Richmond Farm, Duggleby with one fatality.

== Services ==
The nearby market town of Malton, North Yorkshire, 5 miles (8 km) away, is the closest place to find most amenities, including hospital, police and fire stations, railway and bus stations, shops, restaurants, tennis and squash courts, swimming pool, rugby and cricket clubs, cinema and schools.

There are no schools in Westow.

== Governance and politics ==
Westow used to lie within the Ryedale Constituency, held from 1987 by Conservative MP Mr. John Greenaway, until the constituency was abolished in 2010. It is now within the Thirsk and Malton constituency, held by the Conservative Kevin Hollinrake.

The lowest tier of governance is the Westow Parish Council, which represents an area that includes Westow, Firby and Kirkham. It has specific responsibilities to undertake on behalf of the parish residents and a small amount of budget from local council taxes. There are nine parish councillors and a parish clerk who meet usually every two months throughout the year.

== Notable residents ==
- The East German dissident and writer Thomas Brasch was born in Westow in 1945, the son of German Jewish Communist émigré parents.
- Christopher Beckett, 4th Baron Grimthorpe, OBE, DL, (16 September 1915 – 6 July 2003), was a soldier and company director and resided in Westow Hall.
- Edward Beckett, 5th Baron Grimthorpe, (20 November 1954–) is a British peer and Westow Hall was his childhood home.
