= Hopgrove =

Hamlet in North Yorkshire, England

Coordinates: 53.987519°N 1.026208°W

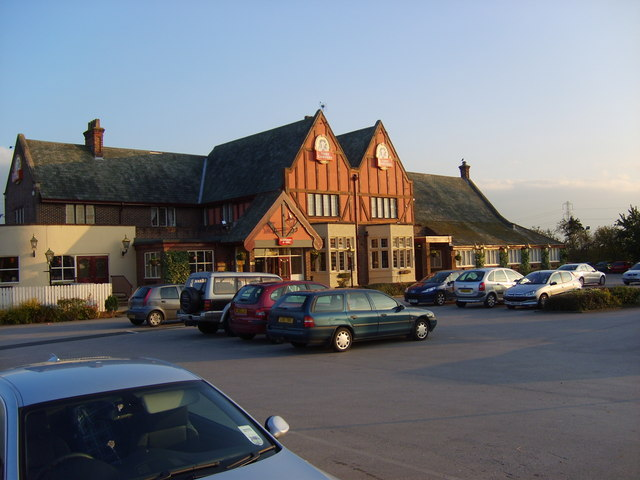
- Hotel & Public House, Hopgrove

- Location within North Yorkshire
- Population: 388 (2011 census)
- OS grid reference: SE639550
- Civil parish: Split between Stockton-on-the-Forest and Huntington & New Earswick
- Unitary authority: City of York
- Ceremonial county: North Yorkshire
- Region: Yorkshire and the Humber
- Country: England
- Sovereign state: United Kingdom
- Post town: YORK
- Postcode district: YO32
- Dialling code: 01904
- Police: North Yorkshire
- Fire: North Yorkshire
- Ambulance: Yorkshire
- UK Parliament: York Outer

Hopgrove is a hamlet in the unitary authority of the City of York in North Yorkshire, England. It straddles the civil parishes of Stockton-on-the-Forest and Huntington & New Earswick.

== Governance ==
The hamlet lies within the York Outer UK Parliament constituency. It also straddles two wards of City of York Council, lying within both the Huntington and New Earswick electoral ward and the Strensall electoral ward.

== Geography ==
Hopgrove is located adjacent to the roundabout interchange of the A64 and the A1036. To the east there are the villages of Stockton-on-the-Forest and to the south the village of Murton.

== Amenities ==
The hamlet has a local pub, called The Hopgrove adjoined to which is a Holiday Inn Express. The hamlet also contains Hopgrove Playing Fields Sports Complex. A bakery is also present in the hamlet.

== Education ==
Hopgrove has no educational facilities, however nearby Stockton-on-the-Forest has a primary school for residents accommodating approximately 100 pupils. Hopgrove lies within the catchment area of Huntington School, a secondary school located in nearby Huntington.

== Transport ==
Hopgrove is currently served by bus operator Coastliner that links the hamlet with the cities of Leeds and York as well as the east coast of Yorkshire via Malton. The hamlet is located adjacent to the A64, a major connecting road in the region.
