= Crambeck =

Village in North Yorkshire, England

Coordinates: 54.09670°N 0.8748132°W

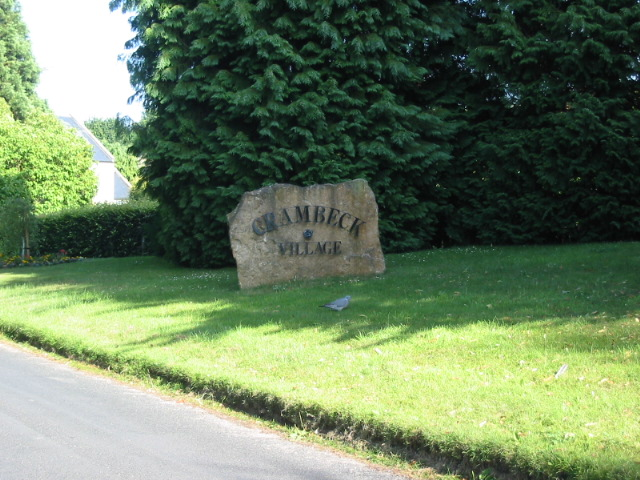
- Crambeck village sign

- Location within North Yorkshire
- OS grid reference: SE73686733
- Unitary authority: North Yorkshire
- Ceremonial county: North Yorkshire
- Region: Yorkshire and the Humber
- Country: England
- Sovereign state: United Kingdom
- Post town: York
- Postcode district: YO60
- Police: North Yorkshire
- Fire: North Yorkshire
- Ambulance: Yorkshire
- UK Parliament: Thirsk and Malton

Crambeck near Crambe and Malton in Yorkshire is near the River Derwent.

== History ==
=== Roman ===
Crambeck is famous in antiquity as having been the Roman ceramic kiln site that lends its name to the locally produced Crambeck Ware pottery. Excavations in Crambeck were undertaken by Philip Corder in 1926–1927 with boys from Bootham School.

=== Georgian ===
The nearby Crambeck Road Bridge on the A64 was built in 1785 by John Carr (architect).

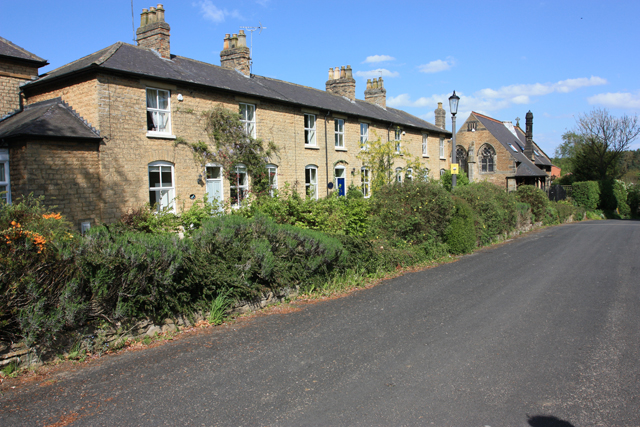
Crambeck Village

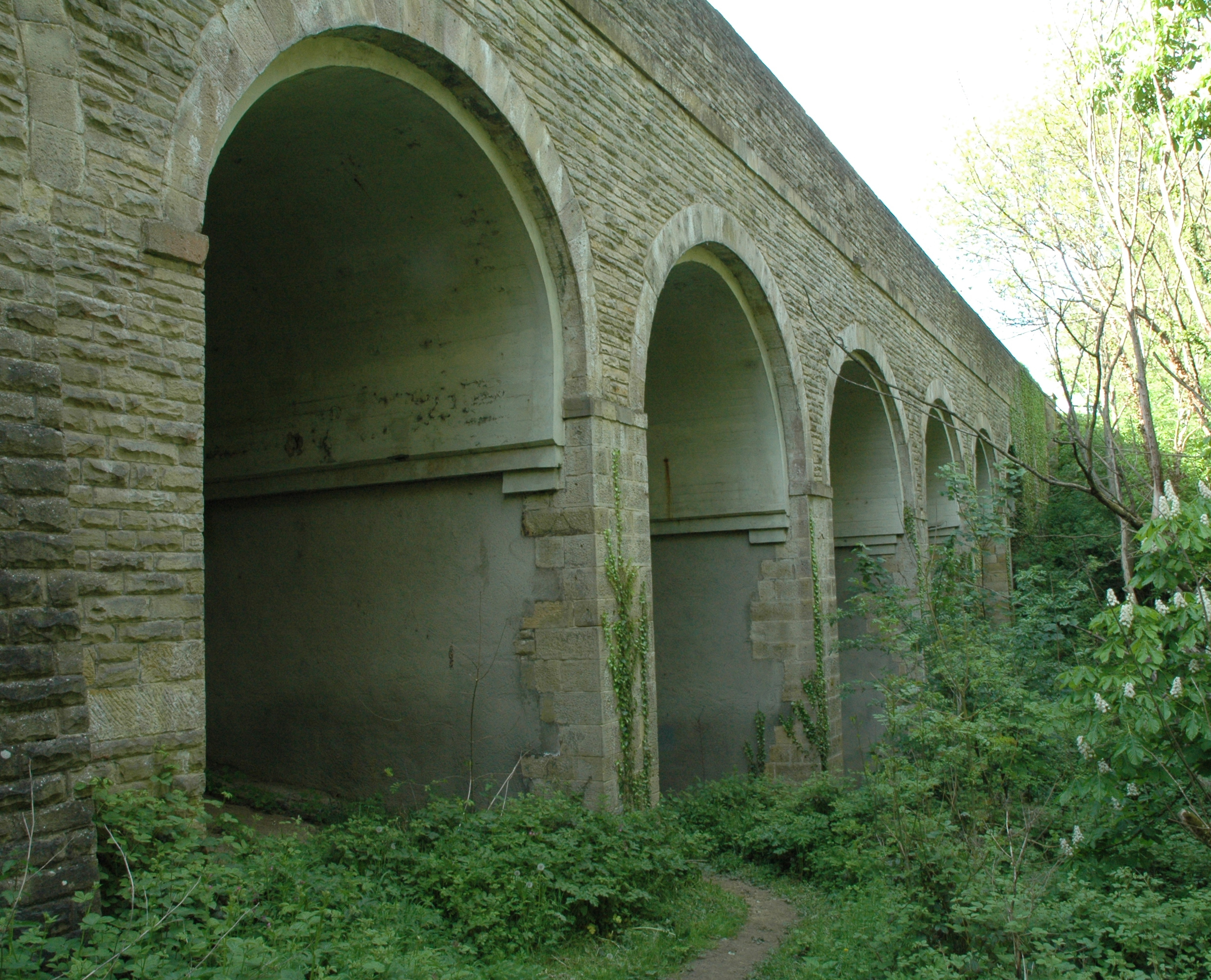
Crambeck Bridge

=== Victorian ===
Crambeck was the home of the Castle Howard Reformatory School (1856-?1986).

The home, run by Humberside county council, consisted of 5 separate blocks of houses with dormitory rooms in each.

=== Modern ===
A local history project recorded memories of life in the village in the 1930s and 1940s.

In June 2014 access to Crambeck was limited by a spillage of mashed potato on the nearby A64.

== See also ==
- History of Yorkshire
- Crambeck Ware
- Listed buildings in Welburn-on-Derwent
