= Firby, Westow =

Village in North Yorkshire, England

Coordinates: 54.0885°N 0.86175°W

Firby
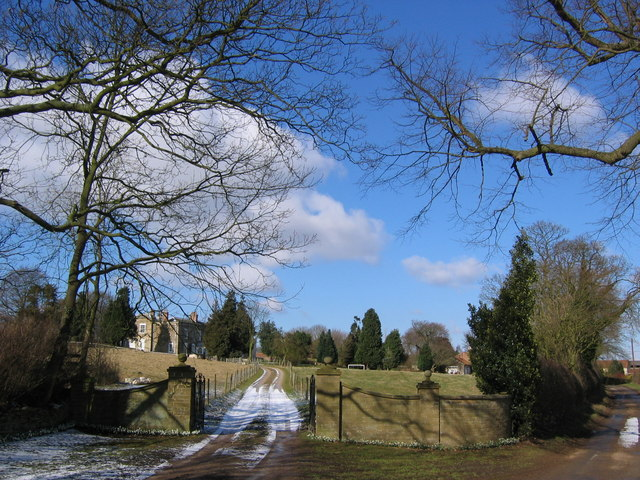
- View from the southwest

- Location within North Yorkshire
- OS grid reference: SE745664
- Civil parish: Westow
- Unitary authority: North Yorkshire
- Ceremonial county: North Yorkshire
- Region: Yorkshire and the Humber
- Country: England
- Sovereign state: United Kingdom
- Post town: York
- Postcode district: YO60
- Police: North Yorkshire
- Fire: North Yorkshire
- Ambulance: Yorkshire
- UK Parliament: Thirsk and Malton

Firby is a village in the civil parish of Westow, in North Yorkshire, England, 4 miles (6 km) south west of Malton.

Firby was historically a township in the parish of Westow in the East Riding of Yorkshire. It became a separate civil parish in 1866. On 1 April 1935 the civil parish was enlarged when the civil parish of Kirkham was abolished and merged into it. In 1974 it was transferred to the new county of North Yorkshire, and when the civil parish of Firby was abolished on 1 April 1986 it rejoined the parish of Westow. In 1971 the parish had a population of 40.

From 1974 to 2023 it was part of the district of Ryedale, it is now administered by the unitary North Yorkshire Council.

Firby Hall is a Grade II listed building, built in the 18th century and now divided into flats.

The name Firby derives from the Old Norse Frithibȳ meaning 'Frithi's village'.
