= Janet Burton =

Professor of medieval history

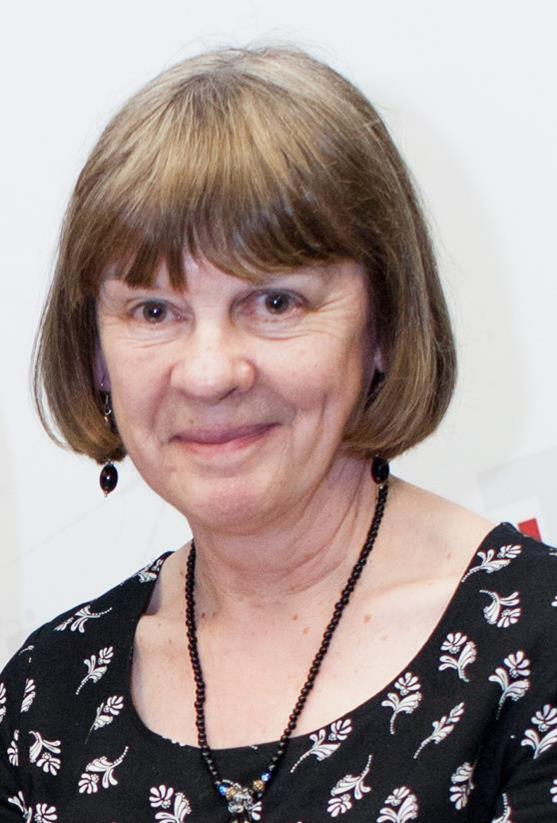
Burton in 2014

Janet Burton is professor of medieval history at the University of Wales Trinity Saint David. She researches medieval monasticism, religious orders and congregations. She is a Fellow of the Society of Antiquaries, the Royal Historical Society, and the Learned Society of Wales. She initiated the Monastic Wales project in July 2007 to research and disseminate knowledge on the medieval monasteries of Wales.

== Research ==
Burton has researched widely on medieval monasticism, with particular focus on regional contexts of Yorkshire and Wales. She has also worked on the Cistercians, regular canons, and religious women. With Karen Stöber, she founded the Monastic Wales project in July 2007. This project aims to establish a comprehensive monastic history of medieval Wales, communicating findings to both academics and the public.

== Career ==
Burton studied history at the University of London. She then completed her DPhil in the Department of History and Centre for Medieval Studies at the University of York, studying the monastic houses of Yorkshire in the 150 years after the Norman Conquest. She subsequently worked as an archivist in York and Aberystwyth, alongside teaching at the University of Wales, Lampeter, working for the York Archaeological Trust, English Heritage and the Vatican. She has been Professor of Medieval History since 2006.

== Key works ==
Burton is the author or editor of 12 books on medieval monasticism. Key works include:

- Burton, Janet (28 January 1994). Monastic and Religious Orders in Britain, 1000-1300. Cambridge University Press. ISBN 978-0-521-37797-3.
- Burton, Janet (28 March 1999). The Monastic Order in Yorkshire, 1069-1215. Cambridge University Press. ISBN 978-0-521-55229-5.
- Burton, Janet; Stöber, Karen (15 March 2013). Monastic Wales: New Approaches. University of Wales Press. ISBN 978-0-7083-2583-4.

== Media work ==
Burton has appeared on several episodes of Time Team as a historical expert. She also featured on Dan Snow's Norman Walks on the abbeys of medieval Yorkshire.
