= Kirkham, North Yorkshire =

Village in North Yorkshire, England

Coordinates: 54°05′00″N 0°52′23″W

Kirkham
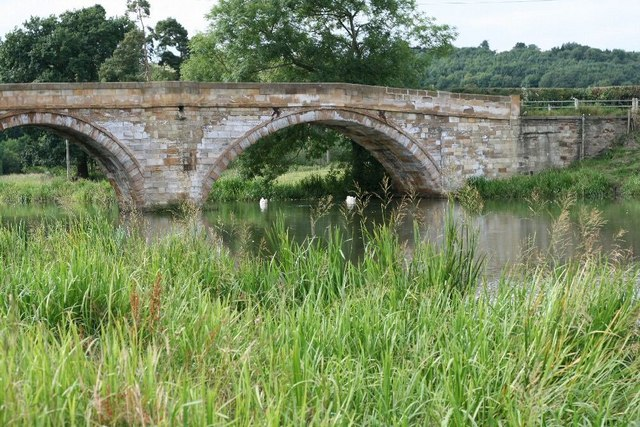
- Bridge across the Derwent at Kirkham

- Location within North Yorkshire
- OS grid reference: SE739659
- Civil parish: Westow
- Unitary authority: North Yorkshire
- Ceremonial county: North Yorkshire
- Region: Yorkshire and the Humber
- Country: England
- Sovereign state: United Kingdom
- Post town: York
- Postcode district: YO60
- Police: North Yorkshire
- Fire: North Yorkshire
- Ambulance: Yorkshire
- UK Parliament: Thirsk and Malton

Kirkham is a village in the civil parish of Westow, in North Yorkshire, England, close to Malton, situated in the Howardian Hills alongside the River Derwent, and is notable for the nearby ruins of Kirkham Priory, an Augustinian establishment.

Kirkham was historically an extra parochial area in the East Riding of Yorkshire. It became a civil parish in 1866. On 1 April 1935 the civil parish was abolished and merged into the civil parish of Firby. In 1931 the parish had a population of 31.

In 1974 it was transferred to the new county of North Yorkshire. From 1974 to 2023 it was a part of the Ryedale district and when the parish of Firby was abolished it joined the parish of Westow.

The name Kirkham derives from the Old English ciricehām meaning 'village with a church'.

Kirkham was served by Kirkham Abbey railway station on the York to Scarborough Line between 1845 and 1930.

John Oxley (1785-1828), an explorer of south-east Australia, was born here.
