= Kirkham Priory =

Former priory in North Yorkshire, England

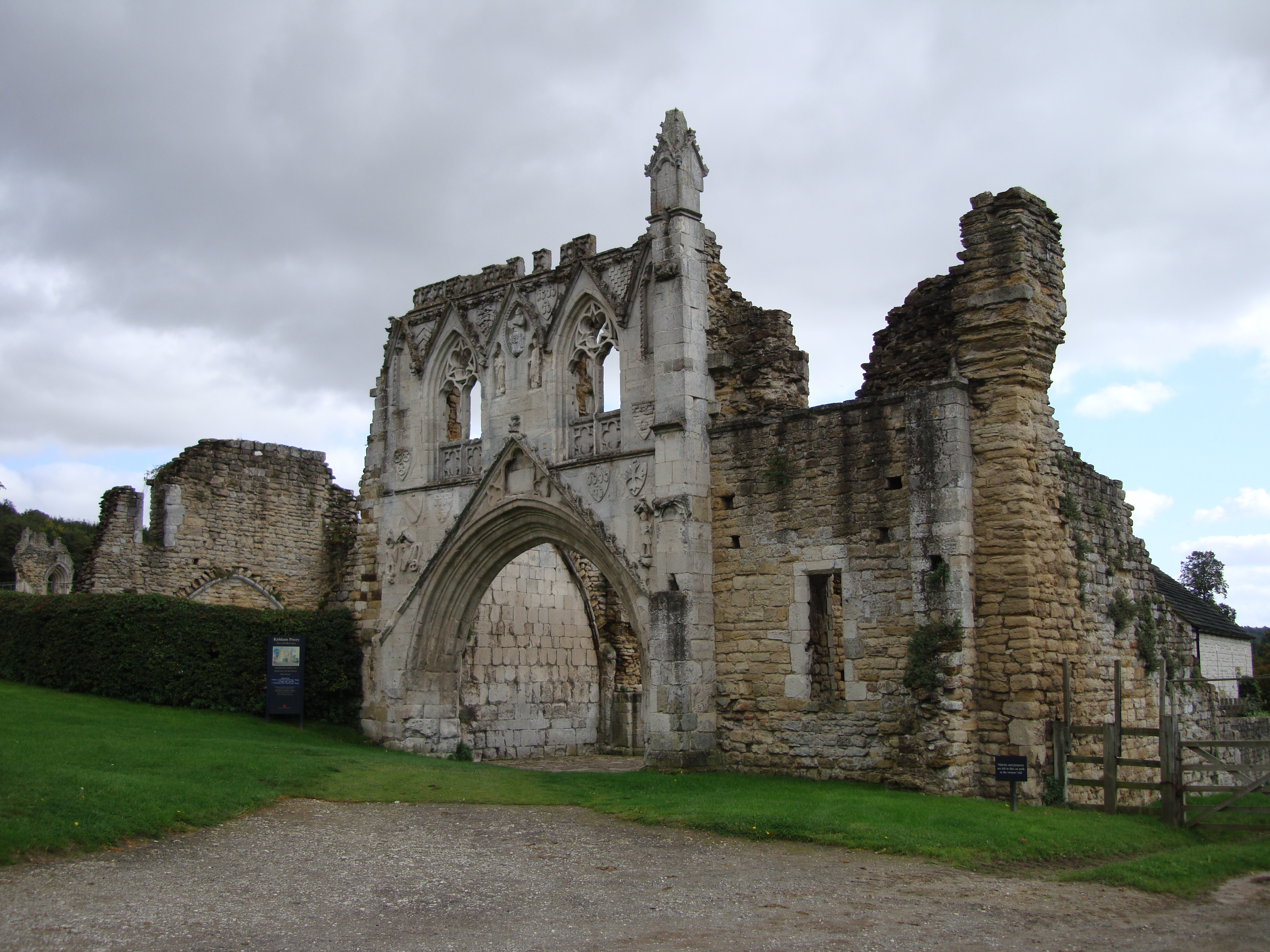

- Location within North Yorkshire
- 54°04′58″N 0°52′36″W
- Location: Kirkham, North Yorkshire
- Nearest city: York

History
- Built: 12th century

Listed Building – Grade I
- Official name: Kirkham Priory
- Designated: 11 February 1987
- Reference no.: 1149116

Scheduled monument
- Official name: Kirkham Priory Augustinian monastery: monastic precinct, three fishponds, and precinct boundary
- Designated: 9 October 1981
- Reference no.: 1014024

The ruins of Kirkham Priory are situated on the banks of the River Derwent, at Kirkham, North Yorkshire, England. The Augustinian priory was founded in the 1120s by Walter l'Espec, lord of nearby Helmsley, who also built Rievaulx Abbey. The priory was surrendered in 8 December 1539 during the Dissolution of the Monasteries. Legend has it that Kirkham was founded in remembrance of l'Espec's only son who had died nearby as a consequence of his horse being startled by a boar. The area was later used to test the D-Day landing vehicles, and was visited by Winston Churchill. The ruins are now Grade I listed and a scheduled monument in the care of English Heritage.

== Gatehouse ruins ==
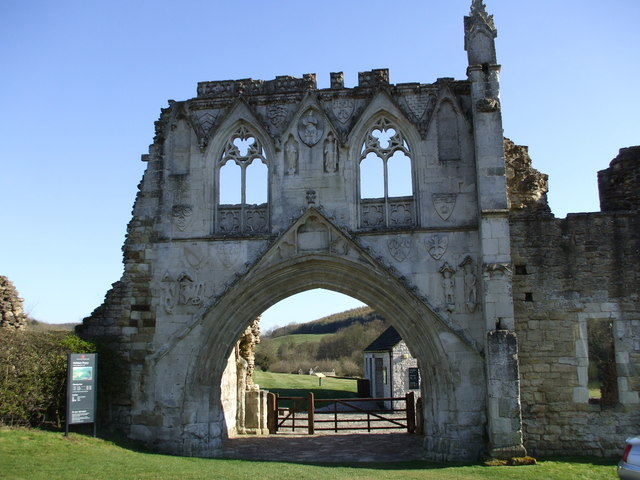
Kirkham Priory gatehouse ruins. The armorials of various benefactors are visible sculpted on stone escutcheons

The Gatehouse of Kirkham Priory, built c. 1290–95, is a specimen of English Gothic medieval architecture. It is a rare survival of such a gatehouse, comparable to that of Butley Priory in Suffolk. It has a wide arch of continuous mouldings with a crocketed gable running up to the windows, with sculptures of St George and the Dragon on the left, and David and Goliath to the right. Above the arch is Christ in a pointed oval recess, plus two figures below of St Bartholomew and St Philip, in niches. There are also many escutcheons with the armorials of the various benefactors of the Priory, including the arms of de Ros, Scrope, de Forz, Vaux, FitzRalph & Espec (3 cart-wheels, each with 6 spokes).

- Arms of Scrope: Azure, a bend or
- Arms of de Forz
- Arms of de Clare
- Arms of de Ros

== Second World War ==
During the Second World War, the priory was used by the military in training for what became the largest seaborne invasion in history, the D-Day landings which took place on 6 June 1944. Amongst units moved to Kirkham were the British 11th armoured division, the aim being to give drivers experience of manoeuvring and to test various waterproofing compounds and to gain experience with equipment to be used in the landings. Tanks, jeeps and other military vehicles destined for the landings were put through their paces at the priory and on the banks of the River Derwent. Troops made use of the high wall of the Western Cloister in training with scrambling nets, which they would subsequently use to make their way from the main transport ships into the smaller landing craft during the invasion. Prime Minister Winston Churchill and King George VI visited the priory in secret to monitor preparations, an indication of Kirkham's significance as a training ground.

== People ==
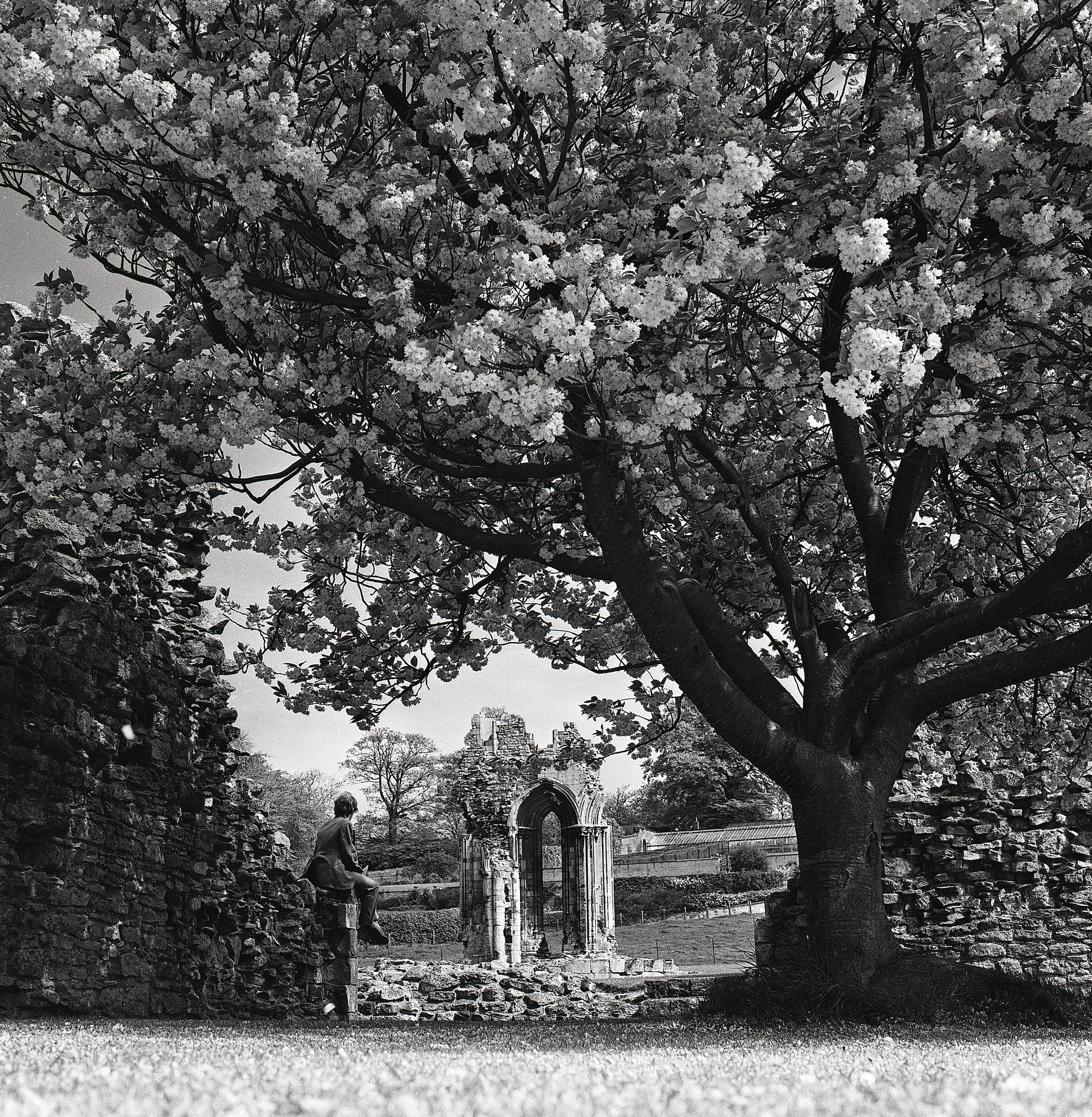
Kirkham Priory ruin with Cherry tree in Blossom, 1971

=== Priors ===
- William (c. 1122–1123), formerly rector of Garton
- D. or O. (c. 1135), known only by his initial
- Waltheof (fl. 1139), left to become a Cistercian between 1143 and 1148
- Geoffrey, elected during the archiepiscopacy of Henry Murdac (r. 1147–1153)
- Maurice (1148×53 – 1174×88)
- Drogo (died 1188×91)
- Richard (fl. 1234–1246, after 1228)
- Roger (fl. 1251)
- Hugh (fl. 1257–1261)
- John de Elveley (fl. 1308), resigned
- Robert of Aldbrough (elected 14 February 1311), succeeded John
- John Kyldwyck, surrendered the priory on 8 December 1538

=== Burials ===
- Sir William de Ros (b. before 1200 – d. ca. 1264/1265), father of Robert de Ros, 1st Baron de Ros.
- Robert de Ros (died 1285)
- William de Ros, 1st Baron de Ros
- William de Ros, 2nd Baron de Ros
- Ralph Greystoke, 5th Baron Greystoke

== See also ==
- Grade I listed buildings in North Yorkshire (district)
- Listed buildings in Westow

== Bibliography ==
- Burton, Janet E. (1995). Kirkham Priory from Foundation to Dissolution. Borthwick Publications.
- "Houses of Austin canons: Priory of Kirkham". A History of the County of York: Volume 3. Victoria County History (digital version courtesy of British History Online). 1974. pp. 219–222.
- Mews, Constant J.; Ijäs, Antti, eds. (2024). Salome and the Kin of Jesus: The Treatises of Maurice of Kirkham and Herbert of Bosham. Pontifical Institute of Mediaeval Studies.
