= Burythorpe =

Village and civil parish in North Yorkshire, England

Coordinates: 54°04′25″N 0°47′32″W

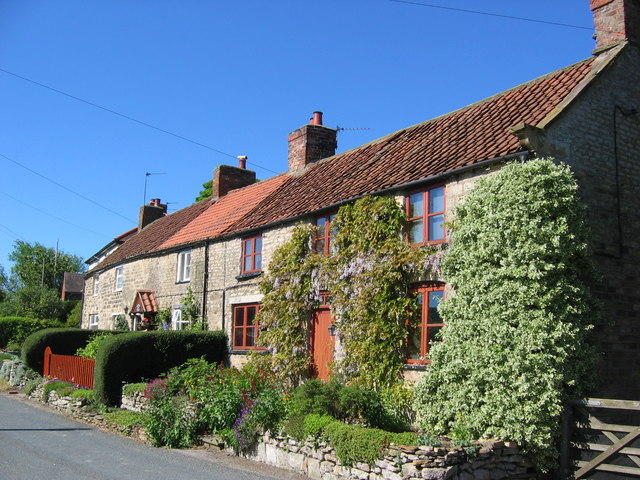

- Location within North Yorkshire
- Population: 286 (2011 census)
- OS grid reference: SE791649
  - London: 175 mi (282 km) S
- Civil parish: Burythorpe
- Unitary authority: North Yorkshire
- Ceremonial county: North Yorkshire
- Region: Yorkshire and the Humber
- Country: England
- Sovereign state: United Kingdom
- Post town: MALTON
- Postcode district: YO17
- Dialling code: 01656
- Police: North Yorkshire
- Fire: North Yorkshire
- Ambulance: Yorkshire
- UK Parliament: Thirsk and Malton

Burythorpe is a village and civil parish in North Yorkshire, England, about 4 miles (6 km) south of Malton. According to the 2001 census it had a population of 289, reducing marginally to 286 at the Census 2011. The Whitegrounds barrow is nearby.

It was historically part of the East Riding of Yorkshire until 1974, then between 1974 and 2023 was part of the Ryedale district. It is now administered by the unitary North Yorkshire Council.

== Etymology ==
The name Burythorpe was recorded in the 1096 Domesday Book as Bergetorp and is of Old Norse origin. The first element is Bjorg, a feminine personal name. The second is þorp, meaning "farmstead, hamlet" (cf. Danish torp, German Dorf).

== Buildings ==
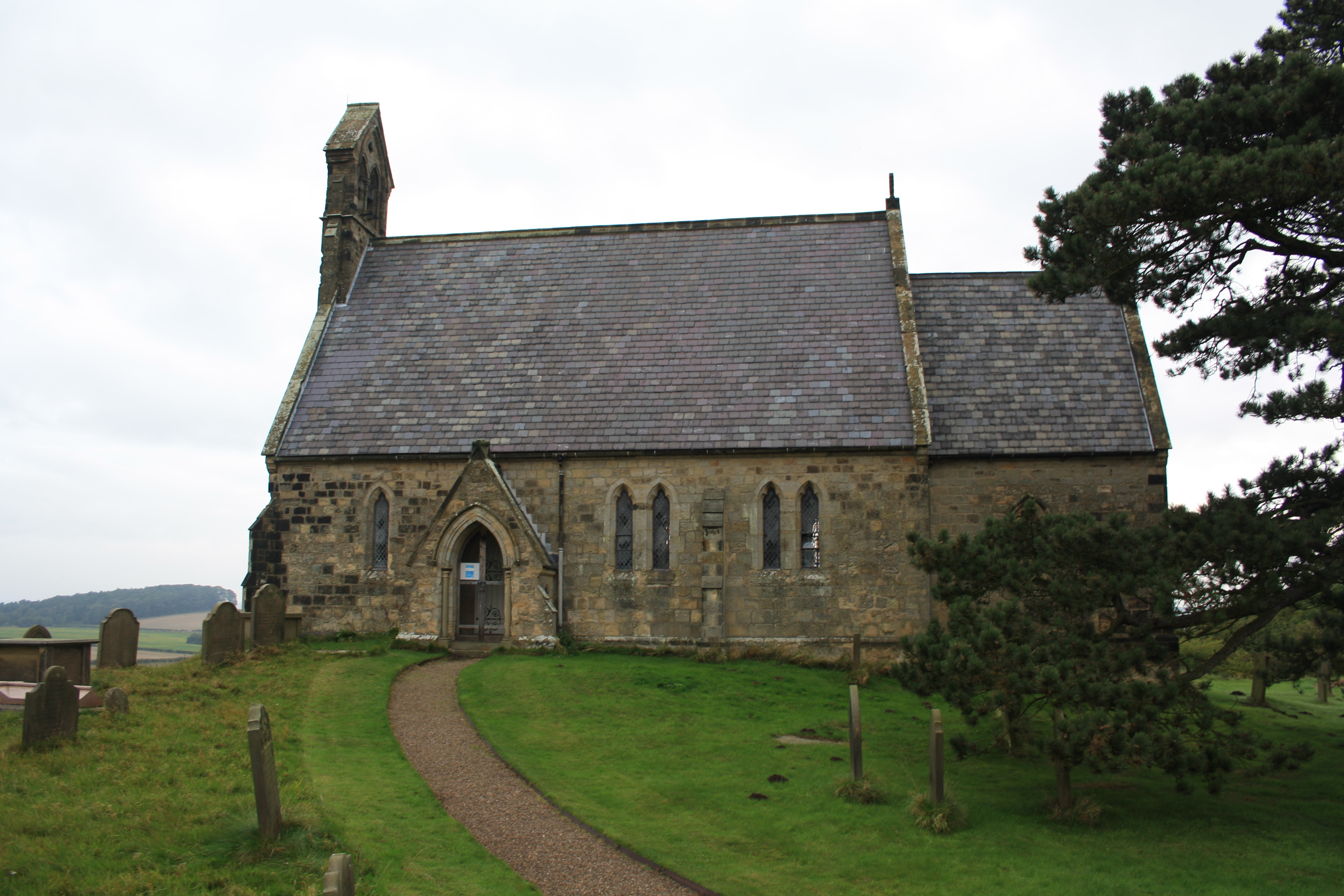
All Saints' Church

All Saints' Church, Burythorpe is a Grade II listed building. The current building was built in 1858 in the Gothic Revival style replacing a previous church on the site.

The Bay Horse public house which closed in April 2014 was reopened in October 2016 after a local group campaigned to have it recognised as an important asset of the community. The pub is listed in Baines 1823 directory along with a reference to Francis Consitt who is stated to have died in Burythorpe in 1768 at the age of 150.

== See also ==
- Listed buildings in Burythorpe
