= A64 road =

Road in West and North Yorkshire, England

Coordinates: 54.0339°N 0.9584°W

A64

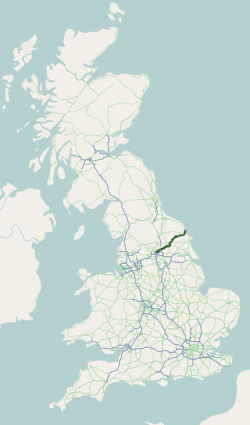

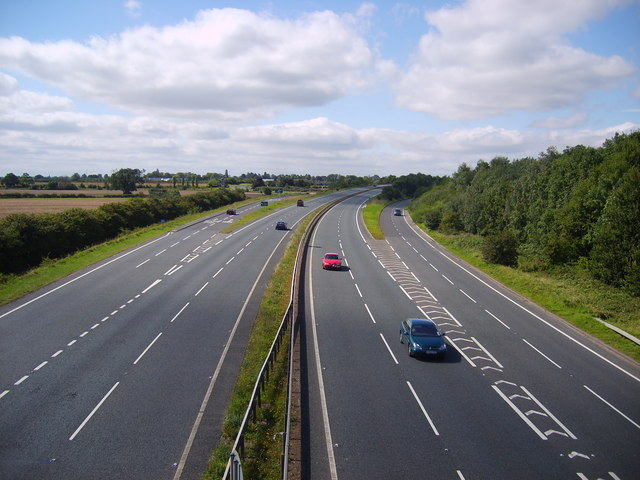
- A64 flyover located south of Fulford

Route information
- Length: 65.1 mi (104.8 km)

Major junctions
- West end: A64(M) in Leeds

- A6120 in Leeds A1(M) in Hazleton A1237 near Copmanthorpe; A19 in Fulford A1079 / A166 near York A171 in Scarborough

- East end: A165 in Scarborough

Location
- Country: United Kingdom
- Counties: West Yorkshire; North Yorkshire
- Primary destinations: Leeds, York, Malton, Scarborough

Road network
- Roads in the United Kingdom; Motorways; A and B road zones
← A63	→ A65

The A64 is a trunk road in North and West Yorkshire, England. It links Leeds, York and Scarborough. The A64 starts as the A64(M) ring road motorway in Leeds, then towards York it becomes a high-quality dual carriageway until it is east of the city, where it becomes a single carriageway for most of its route to Scarborough.

The road approximates a section of the old Roman road running from Chester to Bridlington, intersecting Ermine Street – the Old North Road – at York.

== Route ==
=== Leeds-York ===
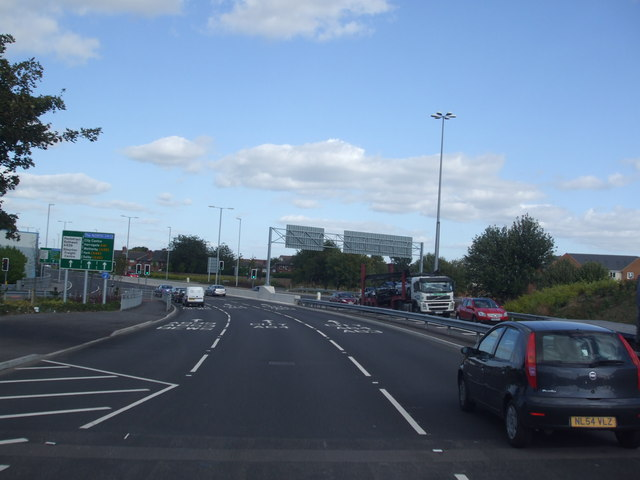
Towards the A1

The road begins in Leeds as the motorway A64(M) at Richmond Hill and the Woodpecker Junction, and close to the West Yorkshire Playhouse and the NHS's imposing Quarry House. It leads onto the York Road, passing All Saints Richmond Hill CE Primary School where there is a flyover for Lupton Avenue, and a left turn for the B6159 Harehills Lane near the Victoria Primary School. At Killingbeck, the A63 forks to the right at its western terminus. It passes an Asda on the left, with Killingbeck Retail Park and Seacroft Hospital on the opposite side. It meets Foundry Lane and Cross Gates Road at a roundabout next to Killingbeck police station. It meets, and overlaps with, the Old Ring Road Swarcliffe (B6902) at a roundabout near Swarcliffe next to St Theresa's RC Primary School, and at Seacroft there is a roundabout where the A64 leaves to the right, with the Britannia Hotel to the east. At Arthursdale, it passes over the former Wetherby - Cross Gates railway line, where the route continues to the A6120 East Leeds Orbital Route (ELOR), linking Redhall and J46 of the M1.

At Saw Wood it is crossed by the Leeds Country Way. The section from Leeds to Bramham was scheduled for improvement in two stages, but was later on cancelled in the mid-1980s. Just before junction 44 of the A1(M), the road enters North Yorkshire. At the Bramham Moor Interchange there are access roads to Aberford and Bramham (former A1). Where the road meets the A1, it used to pass unhindered as a dual carriageway, but since the motorway section of the A1(M) was opened on 4 February 1999, the road now has a roundabout. It now begins its high-quality dual carriageway section for 20 miles (32 kilometres). East of the junction at Stutton with Hazlewood, the Roman Ridge joins the road, which the A64 follows until the Tadcaster bypass. The 4-mile (6.4 km) £8.9 million dual carriageway Tadcaster Bypass opened in September 1978. The A659 (former route of the A64 through Tadcaster) is to the left, with University of Leeds Headley Hall Farm to the west. On the bypass there is a junction for the A162 (for Towton) near Stutton.

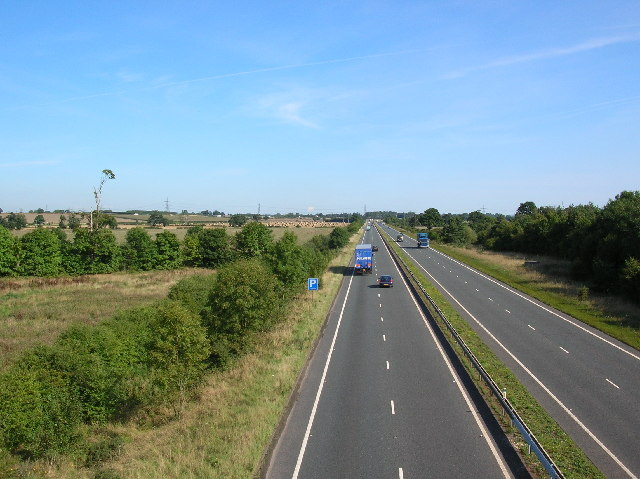
View over the Vale of York

It crosses the River Wharfe south of the breweries of Samuel Smith and John Smith. Near to the right is Oxton Hall, home of Humphrey Smith. At Oxton the road rejoins the former route. On the eastbound side is the Total Bilbrough Filling Station, with the York East former Little Chef and Travelodge at the point where the Roman road (and Ebor Way) join from the west, briefly following the road. In February 2004, work began on a new £11 million flyover at the Colton Lane/Bilbrough Top junction, allowing for the closing of the central reserve. The central reserve had long been an accident blackspot, and residents of the local villages had campaigned for its closure. The flyover was opened on 9 June 2005 by Stephen Ladyman. The BP Bilbrough Top Service Station on the west-bound side was built as well, with a McDonald's. At the turn-off for Askham Richard, the road enters the City of York next to the Buckles Inn. On the left is Askham Bryan College (agricultural), then Copmanthorpe is on the right, followed by Bishopthorpe (where the Archbishop of York lives). There is a junction for York's northern bypass (A1237), which was built in the late 1980s, and on the left is Pike Hills golf club and Askham Bogs nature reserve where the road is followed by NCN 66. The East Coast Main Line (ECML) railway (Selby Diversion) passes under the A1036 junction for York to the left. To the east of the junction, the former ECML railway (through Selby, now NCN 65) is crossed, south of York College. The road then crosses the River Ouse. The 9-mile (14 km) £12 million dual carriageway York Bypass opened in April 1976. It passes under the B1222 and meets the A19 at the Fulford Interchange, near the headquarters of Persimmon plc, and is crossed by the Minster Way, then the Wilberforce Way.

=== York-Scarborough ===
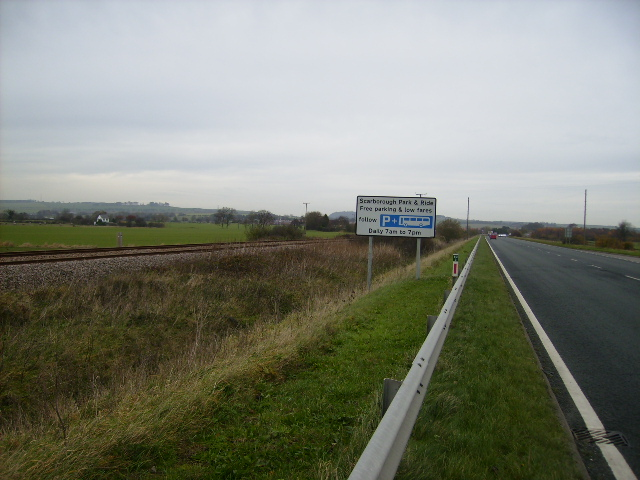
Seamer Bypass

It passes close to the University of York, near the busy A1079 Hull road/A166 junction in Dunnington. The university is now much closer to the bypass due to its new Heslington East campus, and the Grimston Bar Park and Ride is accessed from the same junction. At Murton it crosses the Derwent Valley Light Railway. The York bypass terminates at the Hopgrove Roundabout (named after the nearby Hopgrove pub) in Stockton-on-the-Forest with the A1036 (former route) and A1237 near Forest Park golf club. This roundabout has lengthy queues at peak time, and is scheduled to eventually become a grade separated junction. Going east in the direction of Scarborough, it passes the Highwayman cafe on the left, and the Vertigrow Garden Centre, close to where the former York to Beverley Line crossed. Next is the Four Alls Inn at Stockton-on-the-Forest, followed by The Tanglewood. At the turn-off for Sand Hutton is an agricultural research laboratory (Food and Environment Research Agency), where the road re-enters North Yorkshire. It passes Claxton Hall and a right turn for Claxton, and left turn for Flaxton.

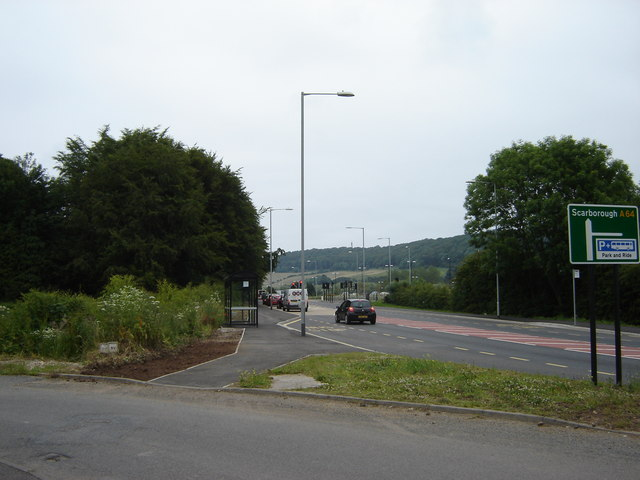
Park and Ride junction at Scarborough

At Harton there is the former Malton Little Chef on the left, opposite the Gulf Coastways Service Station at Flaxton, just after a turn-off to the right for Harton. There is a dual carriageway section near Barton-le-Willows which includes Barton Hill, a steep section just before Whitwell-on-the-Hill, crossing the York to Scarborough Line. From here to Malton, the road follows the River Derwent (former boundary between the North and East ridings). It passes through Crambeck, where it is crossed by the Centenary Way and there is a right turn for High Hutton at Huttons Ambo. The road and avenue towards Castle Howard, including the Yorkshire Arboretum, are here on the left. The 5-mile (8 km) £8.2 million dual carriageway Malton Bypass opened in December 1978. The former route is the B1257 and B1248. There is an intersection with the A169 (for Pickering, Whitby and the North York Moors) near Eden Camp Museum. The bypass crosses the River Derwent and the railway. It meets the former route at Scagglethorpe. Before Scagglethorpe village, the road has been improved to the north to reduce curvature. The single carriageway sections of this road are dangerous, and local people hope for a new dual carriageway. There are plans for a bypass of Rillington. In Rillington it passes The Fleece and the Coach and Horses. There is a left turn for Scampston. At West Knapton there is a left turn for the B1258. It passes through West Heslerton and East Heslerton, then passes the Snooty Fox. In Sherburn it passes the East Riding. Sherburn was formerly in the (historic) East Riding, being south of the Derwent. East of the village is the large Atlas Ward Structures factory.

At Ganton it passes the Greyhound. To the south, the road follows the northern edge of the Yorkshire Wolds. At Willerby, it meets the B1249 from the south. At neighbouring Staxton it meets the A1039 for Filey. On top of the hill to the south is RAF Staxton Wold, a radar station. A three-mile Staxton Diversion has been planned. The road passes the Hare and Hounds and the Shell Staxton and a mile northwards from the A1039 roundabout. It then goes across the River Hertford. The two-mile £7 million single carriageway Seamer and Crossgates Bypass opened in February 1988. It leaves the former route (B1261) at a roundabout, following the railway to Scarborough. It crosses the Yorkshire Coast Line to Filey, next to Seamer Junction where both lines meet for Scarborough, and passes Seamer railway station. There is a roundabout for Eastfield and the B1261. There is the Total Musham Bank Service Station on the left. Near Oliver's Mount, there is a right turn for the B1427. The route travels through the Edgehill and Falsgrave areas of the town, passing the Lidl supermarket and Seamer Road Retail Park. The A64 ends at the junction with the A165, outside Scarborough railway station and the Stephen Joseph Theatre.

== Junctions ==
County	Location	mi	km	Destinations	Notes
West Yorkshire	Leeds	0.0	0.0	A653 south to M621 / M1 / M62 south / A61 – Wakefield, Dewsbury A64(M) west to A61 north / A647 / A660 – City centre, Harrogate, Bradford, Skipton	Western terminus; eastern terminus of A64(M); northern terminus of A653
West Yorkshire	Scholes-in-Elmet	4.7	7.6	A6120 (Ring Road) to M1 / M62 / A58 / A61 / A63 / A660 – Wetherby, Harrogate, Selby, Skipton	
North Yorkshire	Hazlewood	9.0– 9.6	14.5– 15.4	A1(M) to M1 / M62 – The North, The South, Leeds, Manchester, Wetherby	To M1, M62, Leeds, Manchester and Wetherby signed westbound only; A1(M) junction 44
North Yorkshire	Hazlewood	10.7	17.2	A659 west to A162 – Tadcaster, Sherburn, Stutton, Oxton, Wighill	Junction; eastbound exit and westbound entrance
North Yorkshire	Tadcaster– Grimston boundary	12.7– 12.9	20.4– 20.8	A162 – Tadcaster, Sherburn, Stutton, Towton, Boston Spa	Junction; westbound exit and eastbound entrance
North Yorkshire	Tadcaster– Oxton boundary	14.4	23.2	A659 west – Tadcaster, Catterton, Healaugh, Wighill, Thorp Arch	Junction; westbound exit and eastbound entrance
North Yorkshire	Bilbrough	16.8	27.0	Colton, Bilbrough	Junction
North Yorkshire	Askham Bryan– Copmanthorpe boundary	18.3– 18.6	29.5– 29.9	A1237 northeast – York (N & W), Thirsk, Harrogate, Copmanthorpe, Rufforth, Acaster Malbis, Askham Richard	Junction; Acaster signed eastbound only, Thirsk, Harrogate and Askham westbound only; southwestern terminus of A1237
North Yorkshire	Askham Bryan– Copmanthorpe– Bishopthorpe boundary	19.3– 20.0	31.1– 32.2	A1036 northeast – York (SW), Copmanthorpe, Bishopthorpe, Askham Bar	Junction; only York signed eastbound; southwestern terminus of A1036
North Yorkshire	Fulford	21.8– 22.4	35.1– 36.0	A19 – Selby, York (SE)	Junction
North Yorkshire	Dunnington– Murton boundary	25.2– 25.8	40.6– 41.5	A166 east / A1079 – Bridlington, York (E), Hull	Junction; western terminus of A166
North Yorkshire	Stockton-on-the-Forest	27.9	44.9	A1237 southwest to A59 / A19 / A1036 – Harrogate, Thirsk, York	Northeastern terminus of A1237
North Yorkshire	Huttons Ambo	40.6– 40.7	65.3– 65.5	B1248 – Malton, Helmsley	Junction; eastbound exit and westbound entrance
North Yorkshire	Malton	43.4– 43.9	69.8– 70.7	A169 north / B1257 – Whitby, Pickering, Malton, Helmsley, Kirkby Misperton, Thornton-le-Dale, Kirkbymoorside	Junction; Whitby signed eastbound only, Helmsley westbound only; southern terminus of A169
North Yorkshire	Settrington	44.7– 45.0	71.9– 72.4	B1248 – Beverley, Norton	Junction
North Yorkshire	Staxton	58.8	94.6	A1039 east to A165 – Bridlington, Filey, Flixton, Hunmanby	To A165 and Bridlington signed eastbound only; western terminus of A1039
North Yorkshire	Scarborough, North Yorkshire	64.6	104.0	A171 north (Falsgrave Road) / A170 – Whitby, Thirsk, Scalby, Burniston, West Ayton, East Ayton	Southern terminus of A171
North Yorkshire	Scarborough, North Yorkshire	65.1	104.8	A165 (Valley Bridge Road) to A171 / A170 / A1039 – Whitby, Thirsk, Bridlington, Filey	Eastern terminus
1.000 mi = 1.609 km; 1.000 km = 0.621 mi: Concurrency terminus; Incomplete access

== A64(M) motorway ==
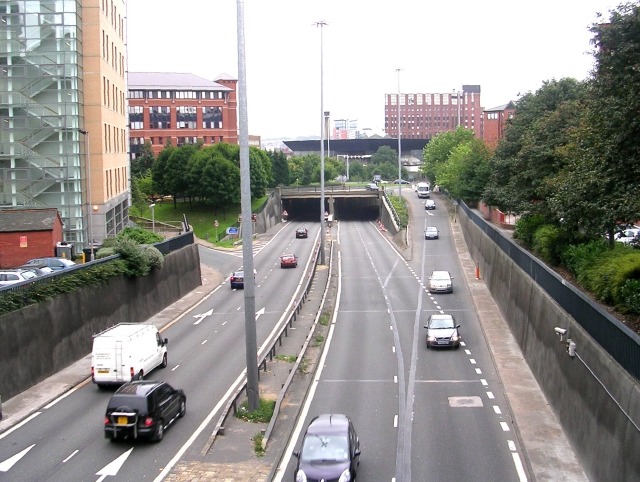
Passing Leeds General Infirmary

A64(M)

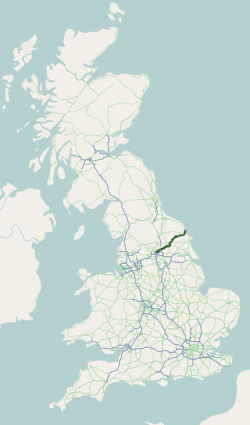

Route information
- Length: 0.7 mi (1,100 m)
- Existed: 1969–present

Major junctions
- From: Quarry Hill, Leeds
- To: Brunswick

Location
- Country: United Kingdom
- Primary destinations: Leeds

Road network
- Roads in the United Kingdom; Motorways; A and B road zones

The A64(M), together with the A58(M), form a ring road around city centre of Leeds. It was built as an extension from the existing ring road, to relieve Leeds from severe traffic congestion. The motorway section of the ring road forms a semicircle around the north of the city centre. It is classified as a motorway to prohibit certain types of traffic and pedestrians but is not designed to modern motorway standards: it has no hard shoulders and many exits are unsuitable for a true motorway, including a right-side (fast lane) slip road exit. Most of it runs in a concrete-walled cutting, but it goes into a tunnel under the Leeds General Infirmary. The motorway cuts through inner-city neighbourhoods such as Woodhouse, Sheepscar, and Buslingthorpe, forming an important link in the road network by allowing traffic from the A65, A660, A58, A61 and A64 to bypass the city centre completely.

=== Junction list ===
A64(M) Motorway
Westbound exits	Junction	Eastbound exits
Road continues as A58(M) around Leeds		Wetherby A58; Harrogate A61; Sheepscar, Meanwood
Skipton A660; City Centre, University, Multi Storey Car Park, Infirmary		No exit
City Centre; Harrogate A61; Wetherby ( A58)		City Centre Loop; Harrogate A61; Wetherby ( A58); Moortown, Roundhay, Chapeltown, Quarry Hill
Start of Motorway		City Centre; M1, M621; St James's Hospital, Bus and coach stations, Burmantofts, Harehills
Quarry Hill; Non Motorway Traffic		Road continues as A64 towards Seacroft The NORTH; York A64; Selby A63

== Proposed improvements ==
The Roads for Prosperity white paper, published by the Department for Transport in 1989, included proposals to upgrade the section between the north-eastern end of the York bypass at Hopgrove and the start of the Malton bypass to dual carriageway. This would have run on the existing road alignment. Shortly after, the Department for Transport published proposals to build a new road between the eastern end of the Malton bypass and the then recently completed Seamer bypass. The plan was for the new road to run parallel to the York to Scarborough railway and would have been to the north of the existing road. Most of the road would have been built as a dual carriageway, apart from the most easterly section. The existing route would have become a local access road. Detailed work was undertaken in the early 1990s but both proposals were shelved in the late 1990s and have not been subsequently reinvestigated.

In 2021, National Highways produced three options regarding dualling the single carriageway section between Hopgrove and Barton Le Willows.

== Incidents ==
On 7 June 1992, Special Police Constable Glenn Goodman, was shot by the IRA near to Tadcaster on the A64. PC Goodman and his partner had stopped the car that the IRA men were travelling in as a routine stop and search inquiry. When they became suspicious and radioed for back up, the occupants of the detained car opened fire. PC Goodman was seriously injured and died later in hospital; his partner, PC Sandy Kelly was seriously injured but later recovered. Both police officers were not armed at the time of the incident. The IRA gunmen including Paul Magee who shot the two PC's escaped and after a manhunt were later imprisoned and then released under the Good Friday Agreement.

A memorial to PC Goodman was erected near to where he fell at the junction of Station Road and Wetherby Road in Tadcaster.

On the morning of 22 December 2014, ex-professional footballer Clarke Carlisle was hit by a lorry on the A64 near Bishopthorpe, North Yorkshire, and was airlifted to Leeds General Infirmary having suffered cuts, bruises, internal bleeding, a broken rib and a shattered left knee. He had surgery soon after and his wife reported that he was "very poorly" but "alive and stable". In February 2015, after leaving hospital, Carlisle said that he had been trying to kill himself when he was hit by the lorry in December 2014.
