= Little London, Leeds =

Area of Leeds, West Yorkshire, England

Coordinates: 53.8075°N 1.5406°W

Little London
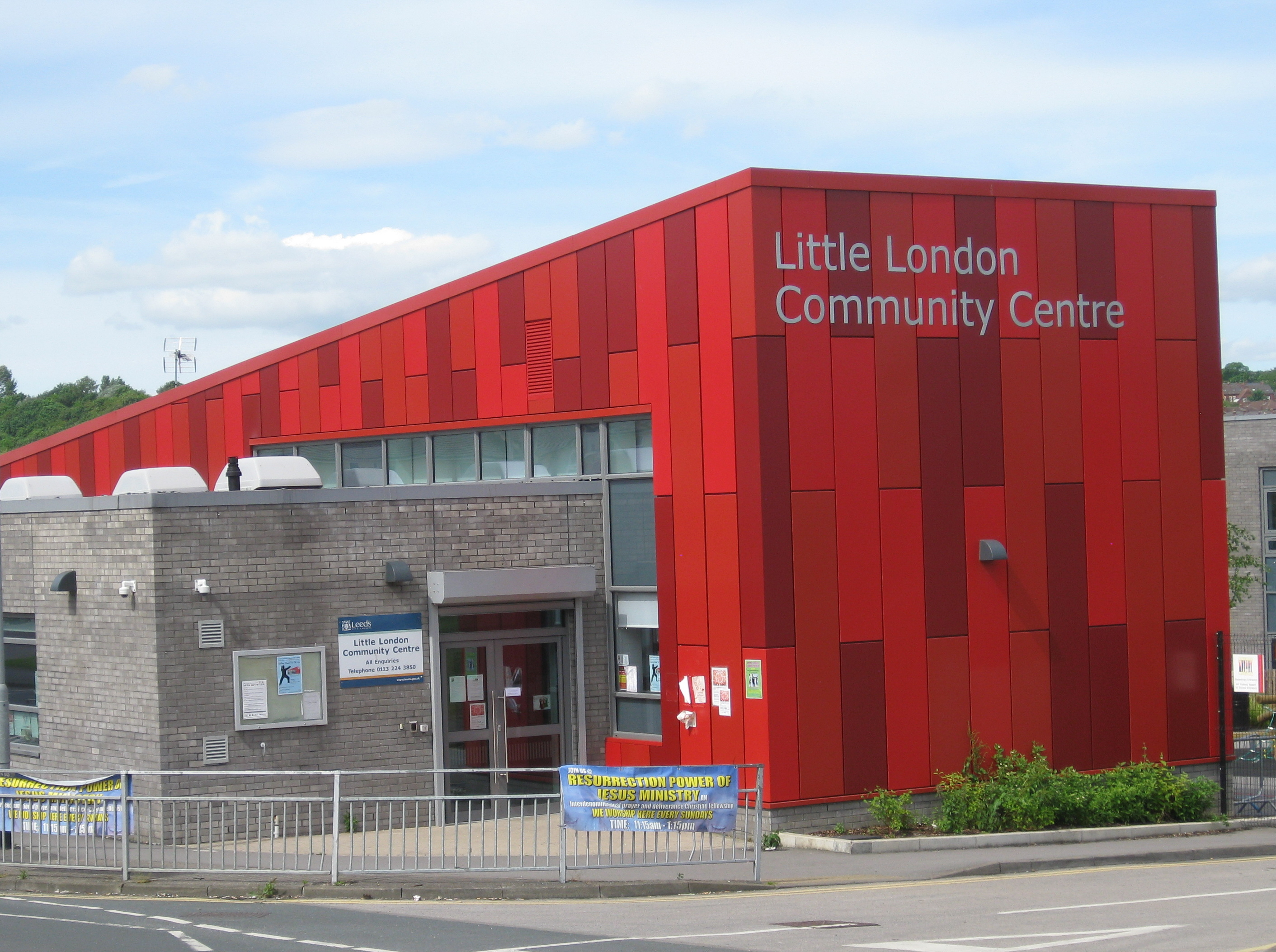
- Little London Community Centre

- Location within West Yorkshire
- Metropolitan borough: City of Leeds
- Metropolitan county: West Yorkshire
- Region: Yorkshire and the Humber
- Country: England
- Sovereign state: United Kingdom
- Post town: LEEDS
- Postcode district: LS7
- Dialling code: 0113
- Police: West Yorkshire
- Fire: West Yorkshire
- Ambulance: Yorkshire
- UK Parliament: Leeds Central and Headingley

Little London is a residential area of Leeds in England, north of the city centre and Leeds Inner Ring Road. It is so called because in the 19th century it had fashionable housing and interesting architecture comparable to London. In the 1950s and '60s it became largely council housing and now consists of a mixture of high and low-rise flats and housing. The area falls within the Little London and Woodhouse ward of the City of Leeds Council. The area is divided into four estates; Lovell Park, Oatlands, Carlton and the Servias.

== History ==
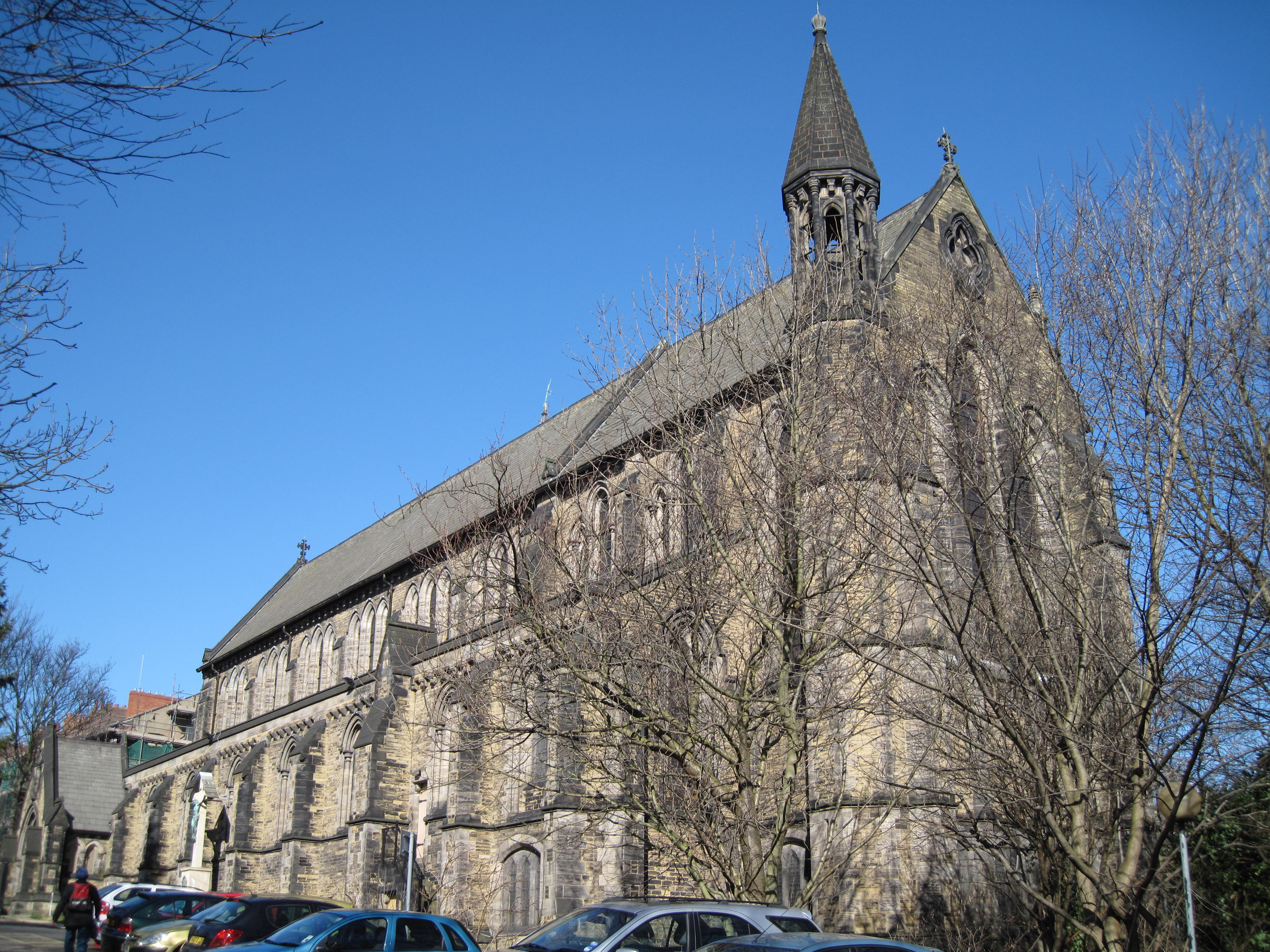
All Souls' Church, Blackman Lane

The area developed around an area then known as The Leylands in the 18th century, originally as a largely working class residential area housing workers for the area's textile industry. In 1865 the Carlton Barracks opened in the area and is still open. By the 1950s the area had become dilapidated, with much of the area's back-to-back housing being considered unfit for human habitation, and the area was redeveloped in a slum clearance scheme. Around the same time the layout of the area was changed by the construction of the Leeds Inner Ring Road and the Sheepscar Interchange. As part of the area's redevelopment, the main thoroughfare, Camp Road, was renamed Lovell Park Road to the south and Oatlands Lane further north. There are a few buildings in the area that predate the redevelopment during the 1960s and 1970s, All Souls' Church being one of them. A more modest redevelopment of the area was undertaken in the 2010s.

== Description ==
The area backs onto the Sheepscar Interchange, a major road interchange between the A61 towards Harrogate and the A58 towards Wetherby) and the Leeds Inner Ring Road.

To the east of Lovell Park Road is the Oatland estate (i.e. the street names mainly include Oatland). This includes Little London Primary School which was opened in 1974, then closed because of an arson attack in 1995. It re-opened, refurbished in 1999 as Little London Community Primary School. It also includes a community centre and three tower blocks. To the west is the Carlton estate which includes three 12-storey blocks of flats which were built in 1965 and since refurbished: Carlton Garth, Carlton Croft and Carlton Close. This is named from the 19th century Carlton Barracks which is still in operation. The local pub is The Leeds Rifleman: its name was changed from Windsor Castle in 1984 to honour the 125th anniversary of the founding of the Leeds Rifle Regiment. There were previously two pubs on the Lovel Park Estate; the Londoner and the Hobby Horse and the Oatland estate boasted the Kings Arms and the Lovell Park social club but all these have since closed leaving the Leeds Rifleman on the Carlton Estate as the sole remaining pub.

To the south of Claypit Lane is the Lovell Park estate.

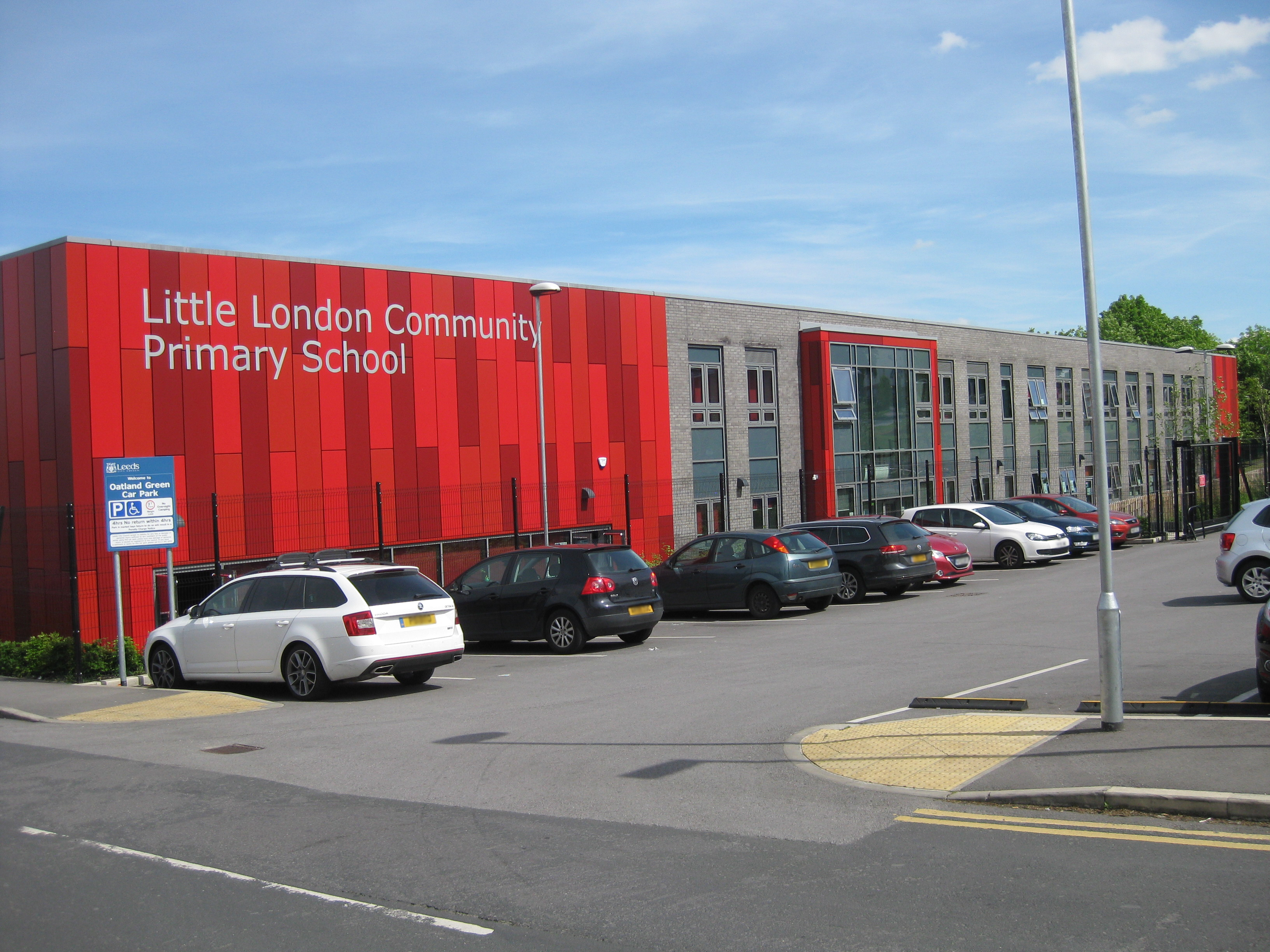
Primary School

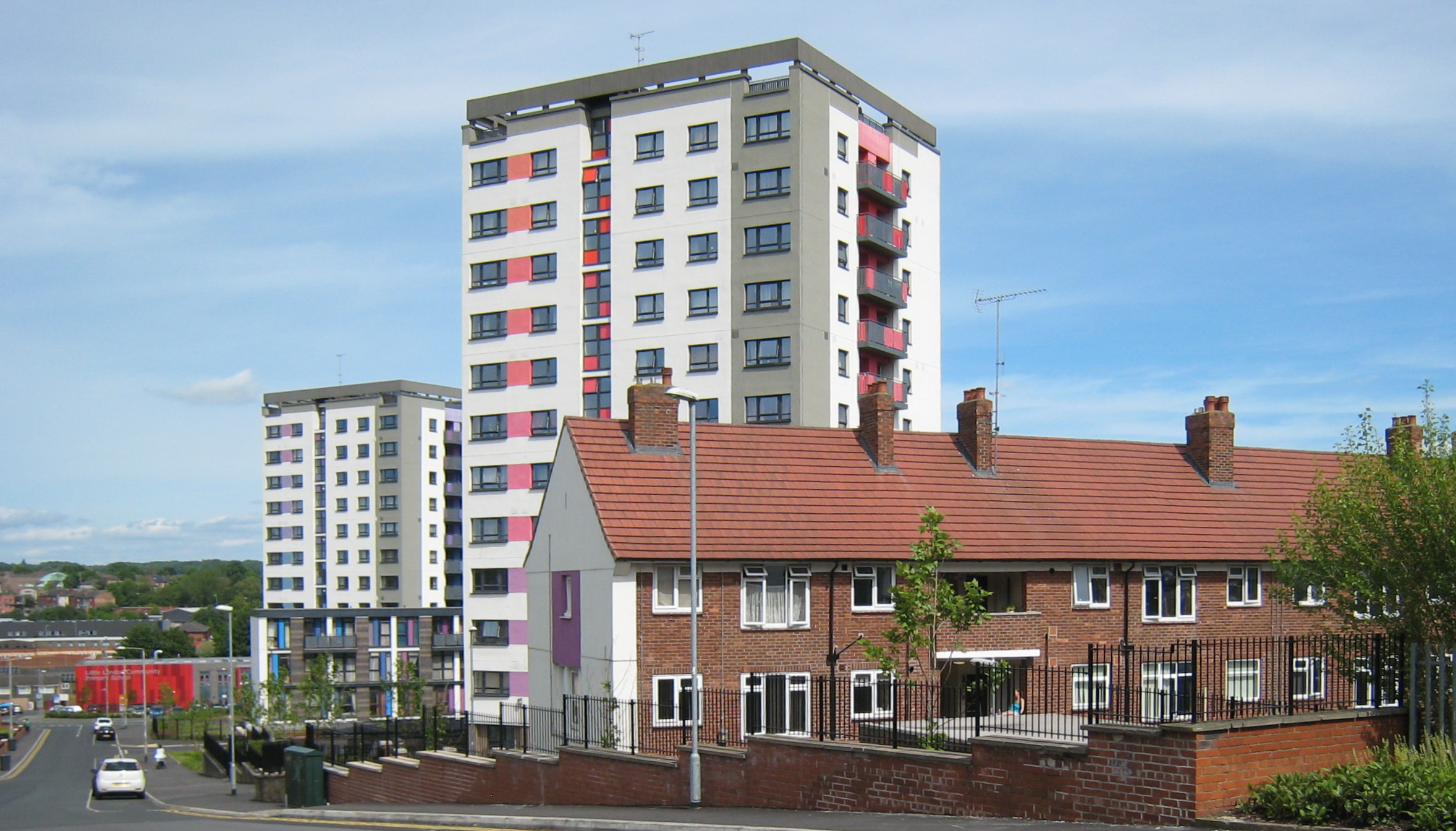
Part of the Carlton estate

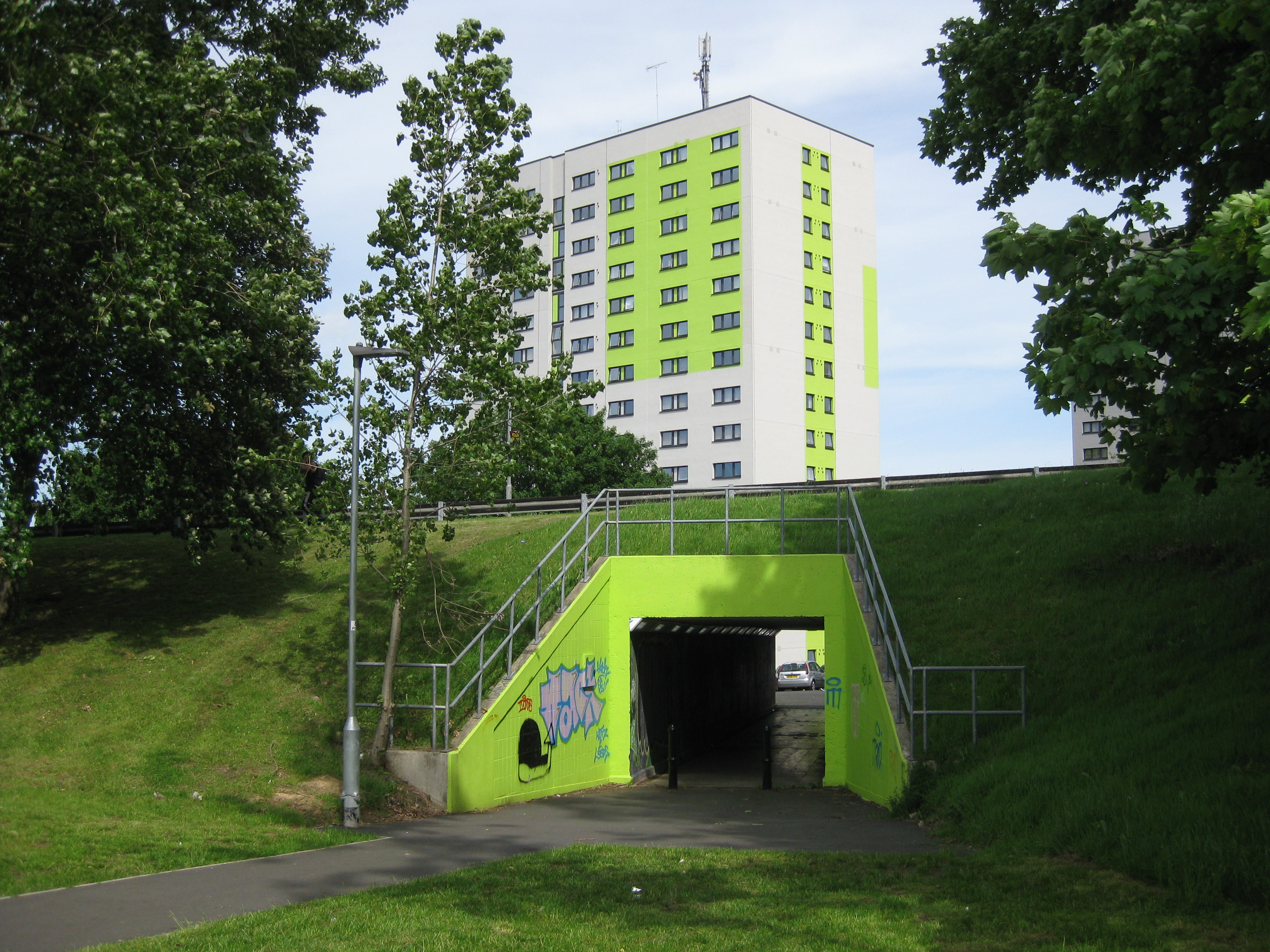
Subway from the Carlton estate to Oatland Towers

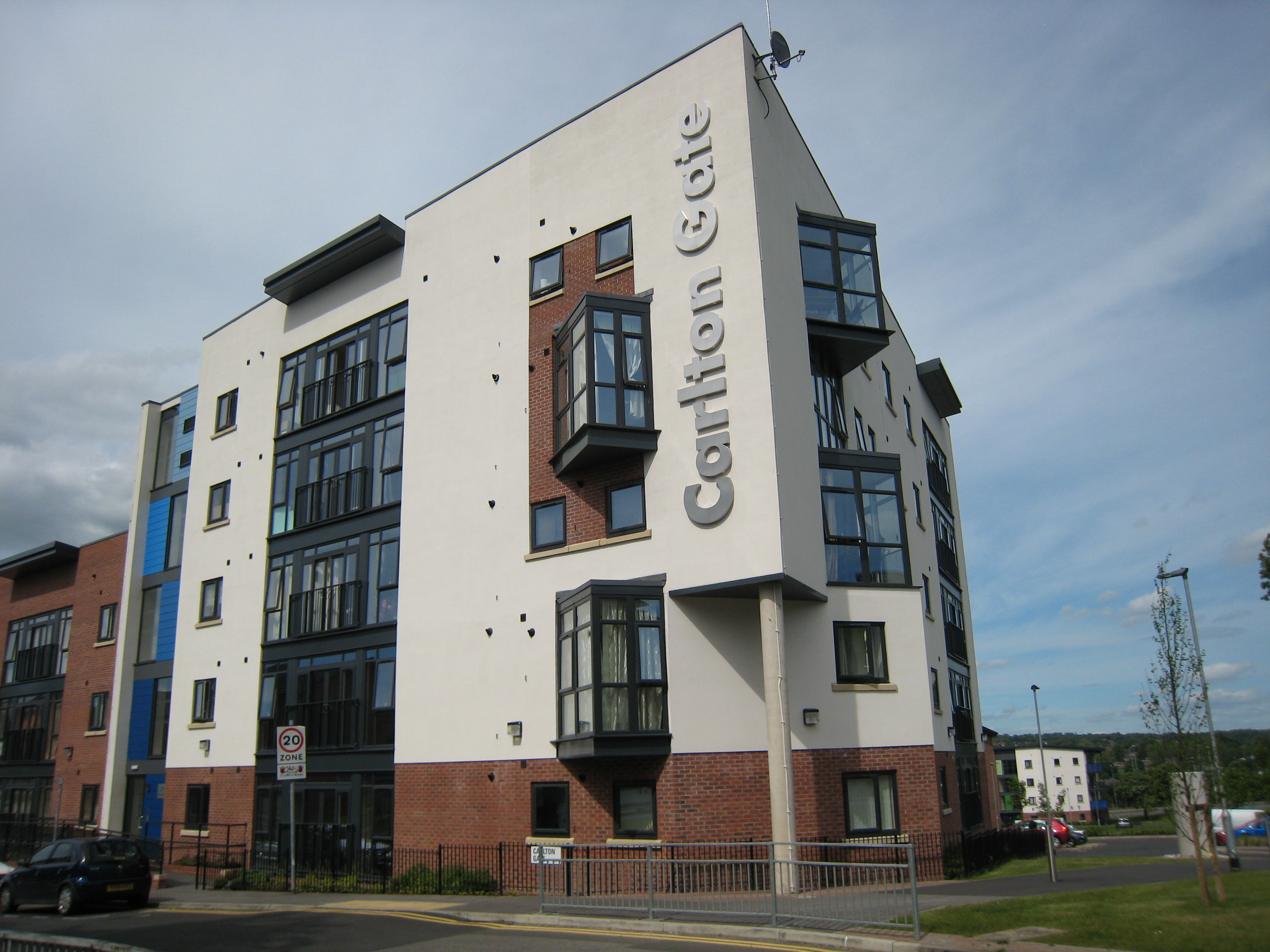
More modern buildings on Carlton Gate

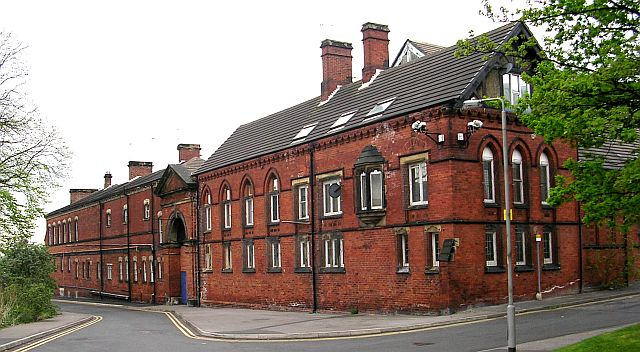
Carlton Barracks 2007

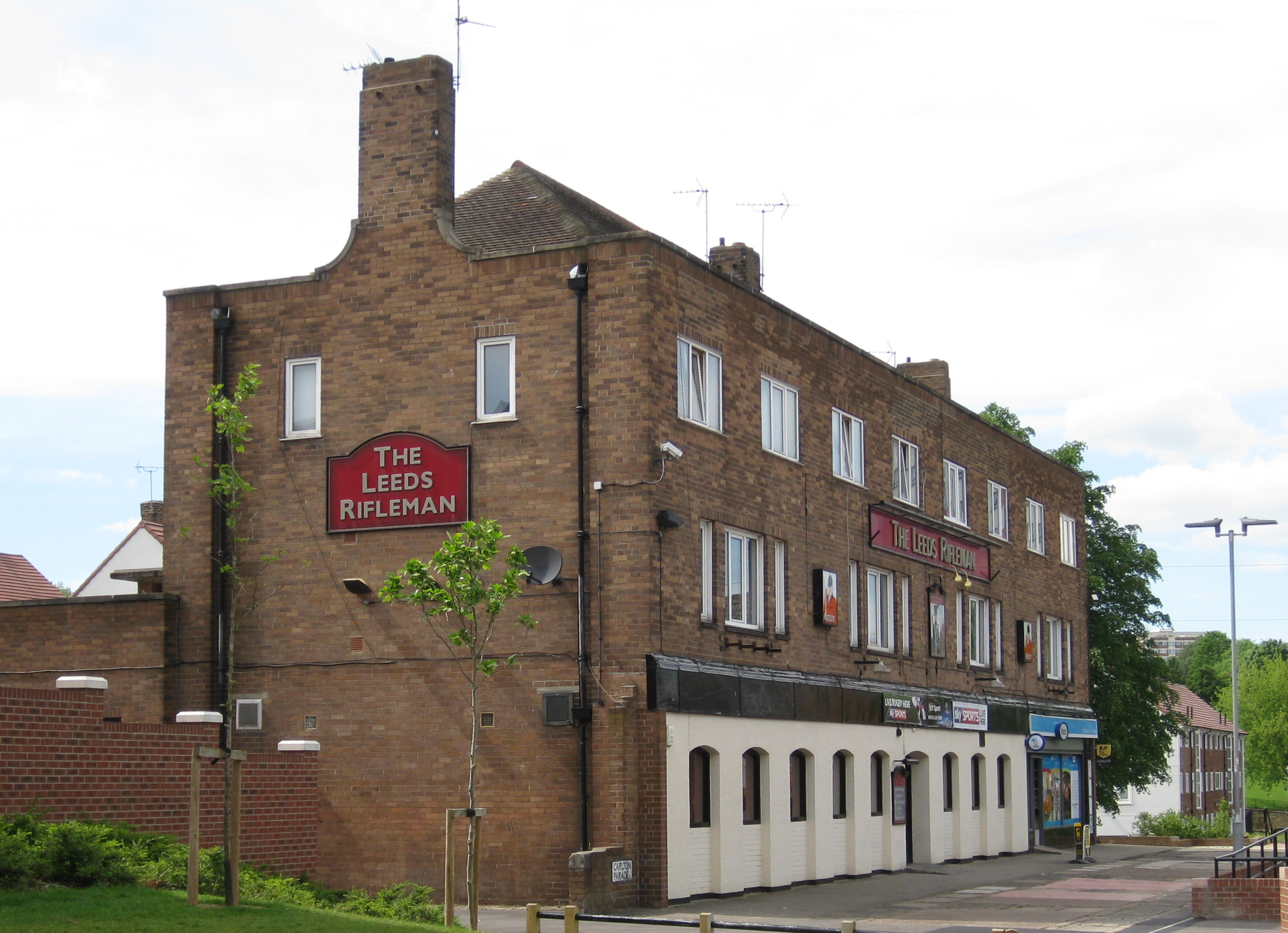
The Leeds Rifleman

=== Crime ===
In the early 2000s ASBOs had been issued in the Little London area to counter drug dealing and anti-social behaviour. The leader of the Labour Party Group on Leeds Council thought that these orders had been achieving a reduction in crime in the area. In 2003 66 ASBOs were issued in Little London as a crackdown on anti-social behaviour and drug dealing, the area of Blackman Lane identified as a centre for supply of controlled drugs and attendant criminality. The tenants and residents association, along with politicians, expressed support for the police action, which was assured would continue. In a letter to the Yorkshire Evening Post in 2004, he expressed the view that support for ASBOs by the Council needed to be sustained as residents in Little London had noticed a then recent increase in drug dealing, and he hoped that the council would continue to commit funding and commitment to the problem.

In November 2011 Little London became a target for street robberies, sometimes accompanied with violence, over Bonfire Night weekend and later in the month.

== Redevelopment ==
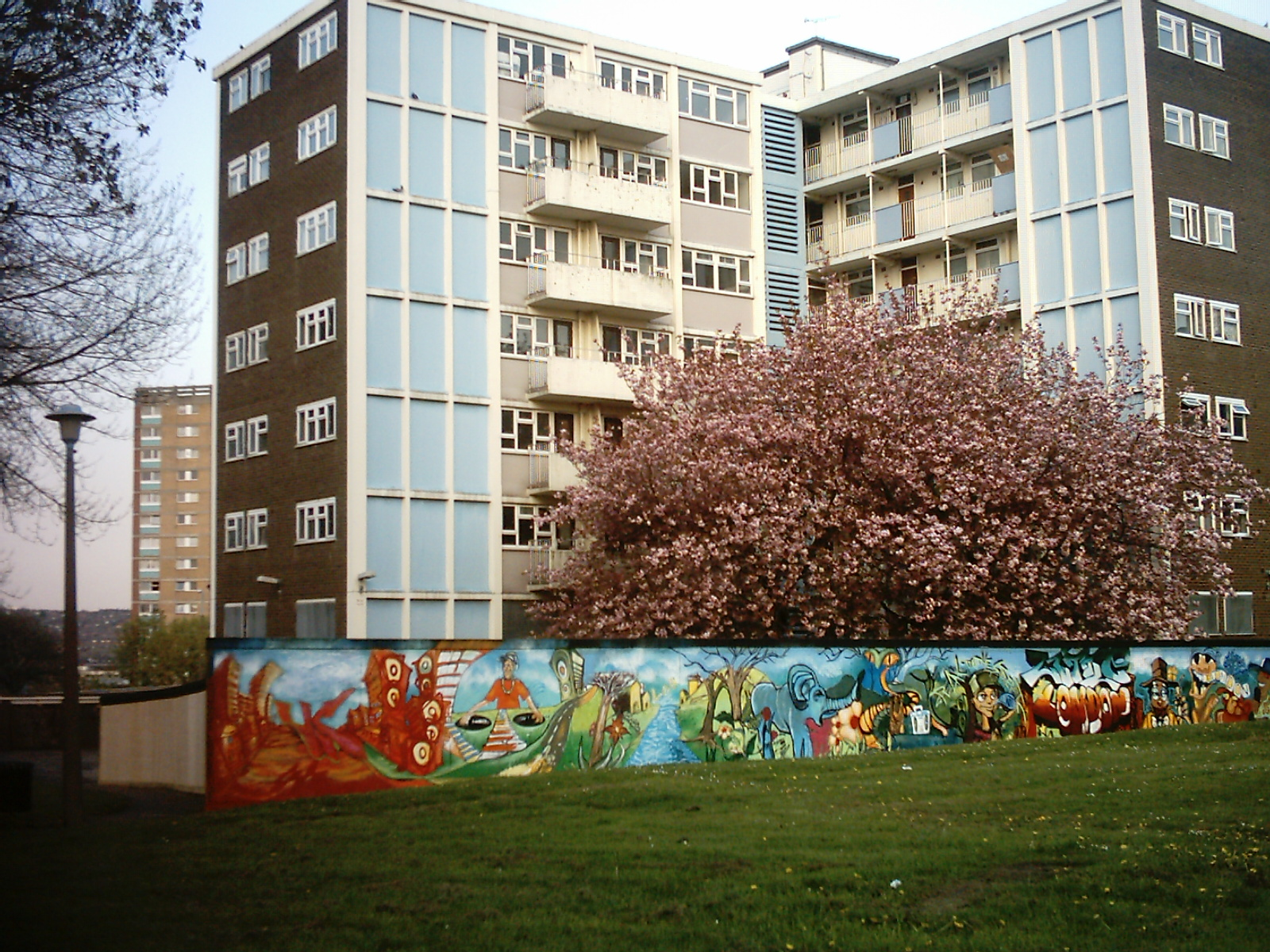
Carlton Towers in 2009 awaiting demolition

Starting in 2010 the Carlton Estate was redeveloped with both blocks of the aging 1950s built Carlton Towers being demolished. Following the demolition new low-rise and medium-rise housing was built as well as new shops and a community centre Later in the decade the high-rise blocks on the Oatland Estate were refurbished and reclad. The blocks on the Lovell Park estate were refurbished although have not been reclad and retain their original brick cladding. Around the same time the Holbeck district was redeveloped in a similar way; in both cases the slab style blocks were considered uneconomical for repair while the newer 'H' blocks were refurbished.

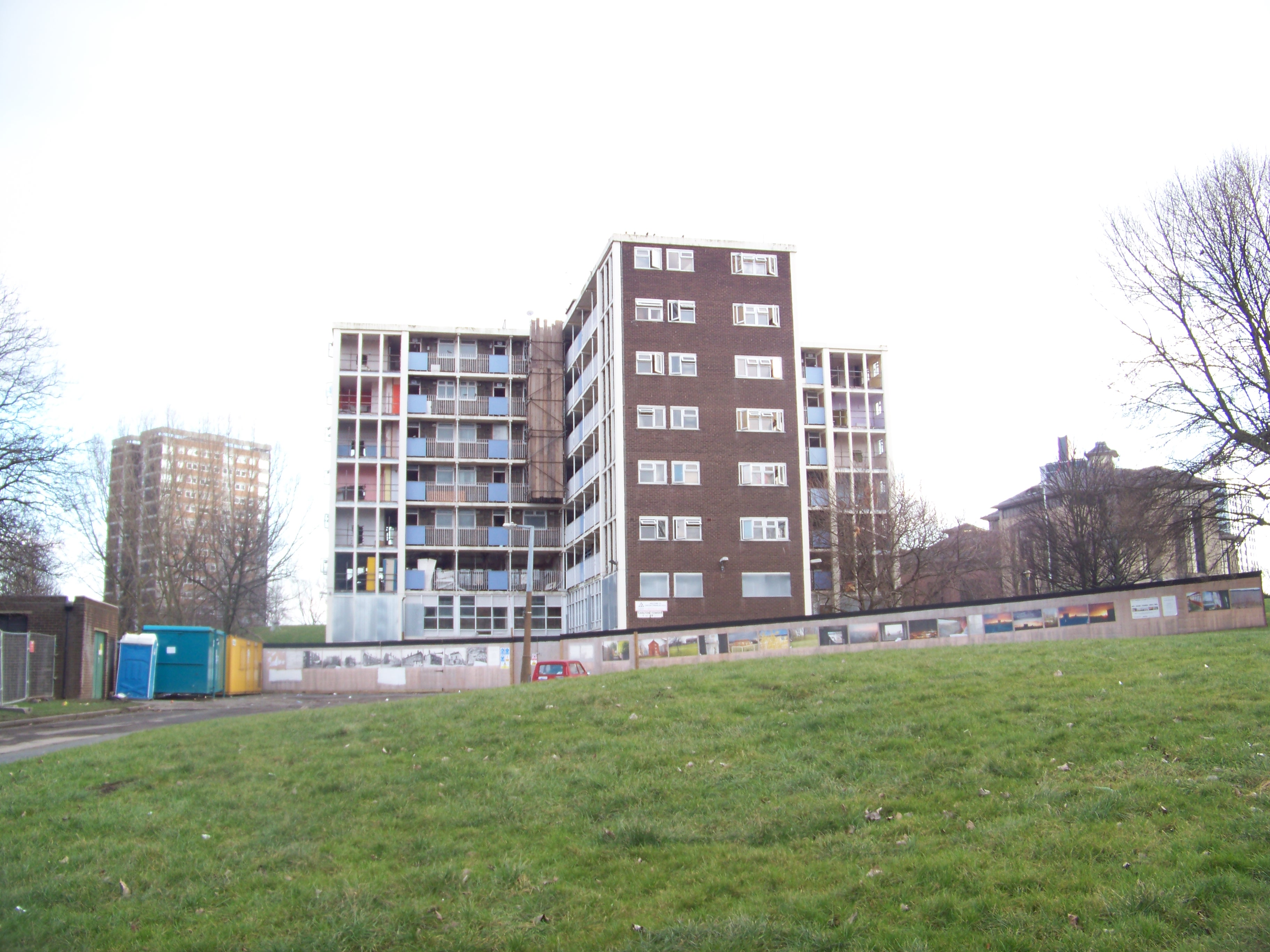
Carlton Towers flats 1-49, prepared for demolition

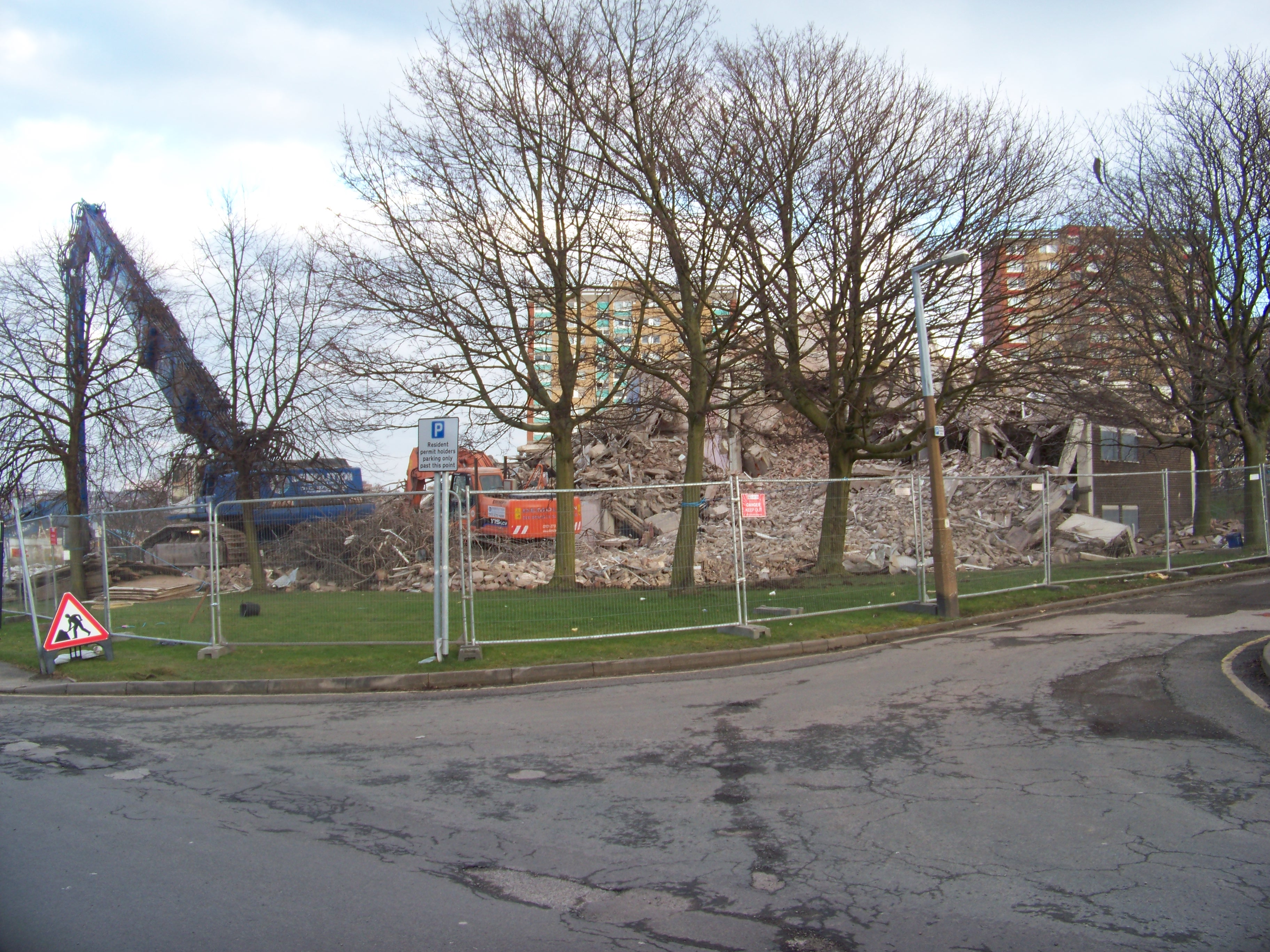
Carlton Towers flats 50-99 having been demolished

== Transport ==
The area is situated close to the Sheepscar Interchange where the A58 and A61 converge and also the Leeds Inner Ring Road. There is no railway station in the vicinity. Buses serving the area are operated by First Leeds. Leeds City Centre is within walking distance.

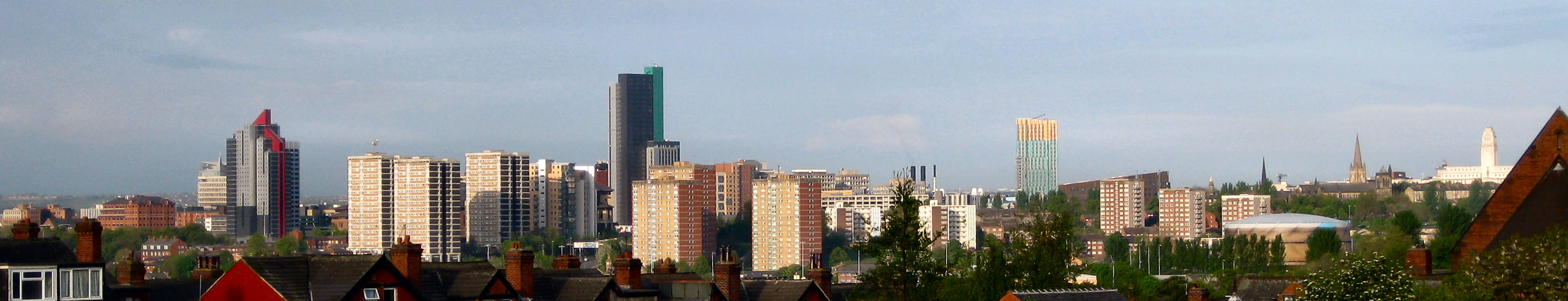
A view over Sheepscar, Lovell Park and Little London, taken from Bandstead Park in Harehills.

== Notable people ==
- Will Scott (1893−1964), author born at 128 Camp Road (now demolished and renamed Oatland Lane)
- Frank Percy Wild, (1861–1950), artist, was born at 50 Camp Road
