= Sheepscar =

Suburb of Leeds, West Yorkshire, England

Coordinates: 53°48.5′N 1°32′W

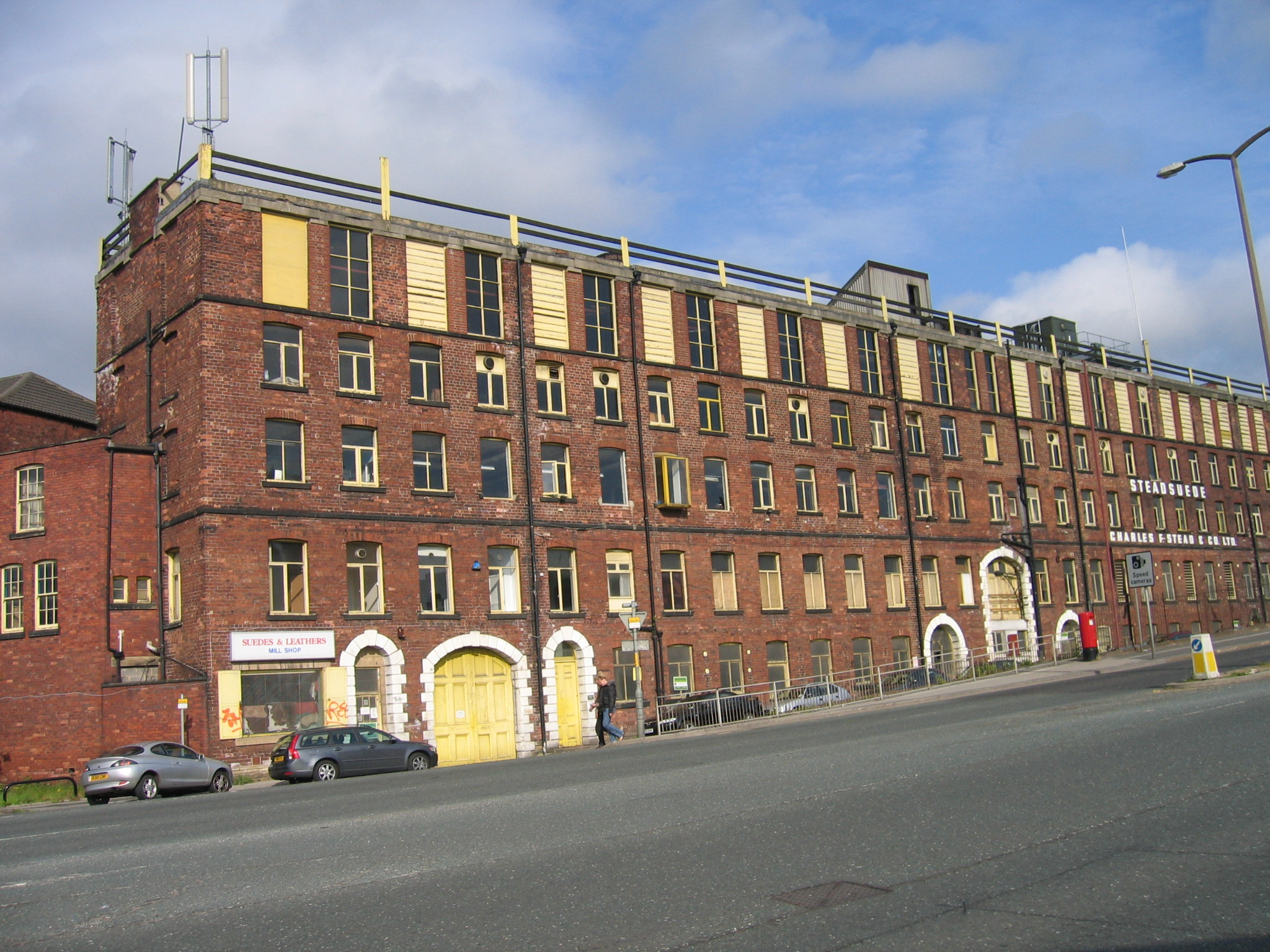
Sheepscar Tannery

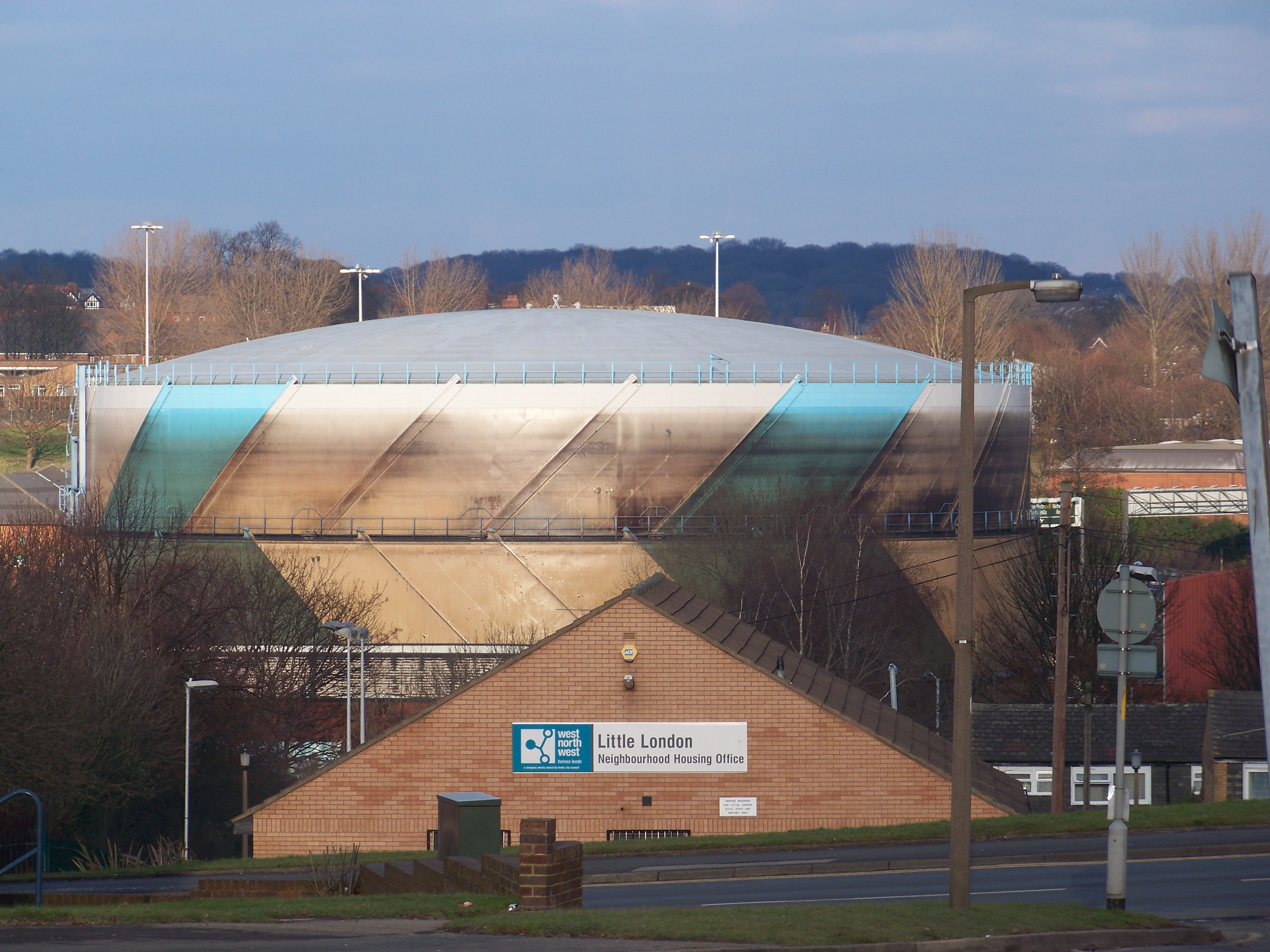
The Sheepscar gasholder

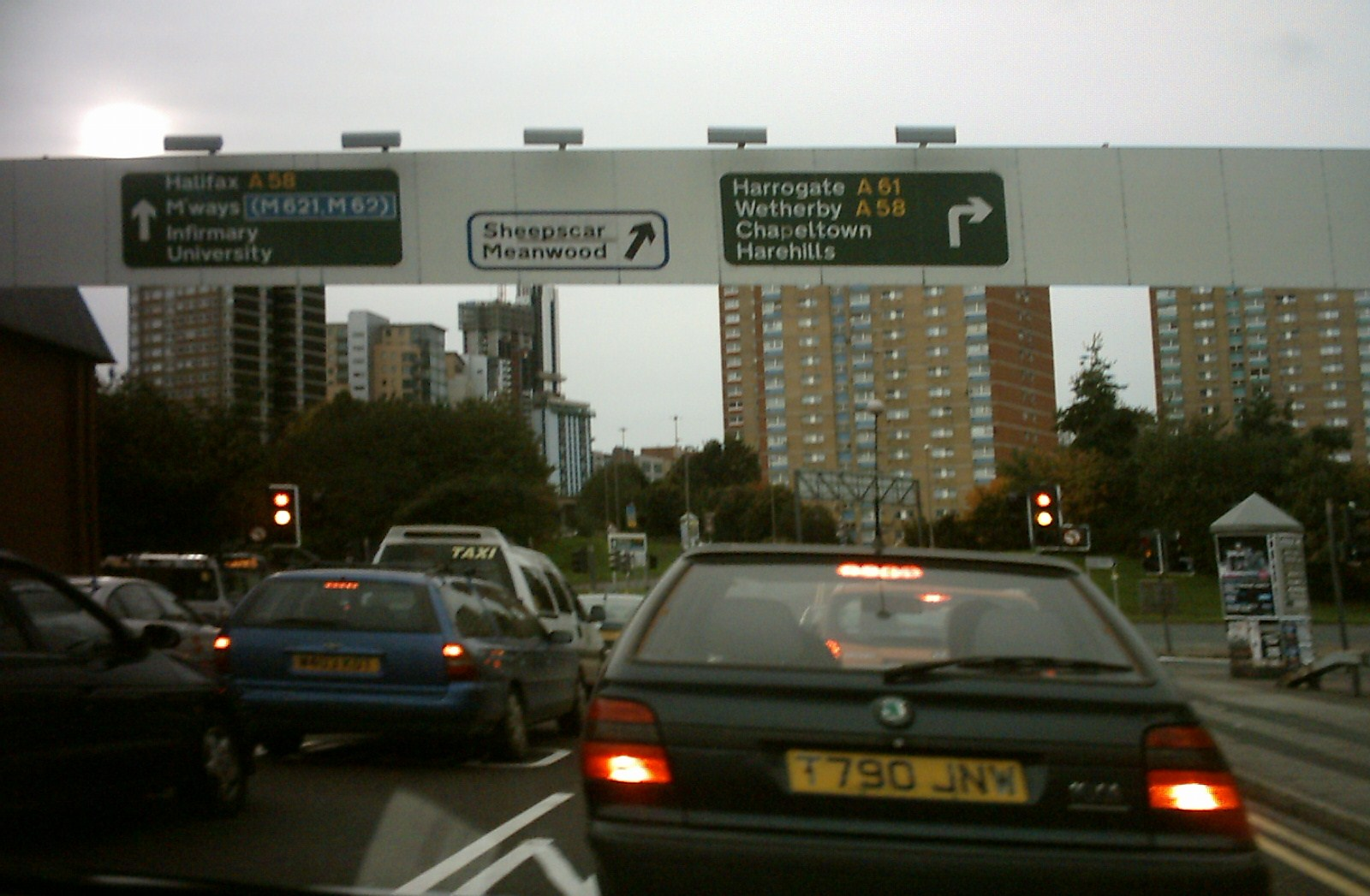
Sheepscar Interchange on the A58 and the A61.

Sheepscar is an inner city district of Leeds in West Yorkshire England, lying to the north east of Leeds city centre. The district is in the City of Leeds Metropolitan Council. It is overlooked by the tower blocks of Little London and Lovell Park to the west, and gives way to Meanwood in the north-west, Chapeltown in the north-east and Burmantofts in the east.

Clay Pit Lane runs through Sheepscar to the south, while Scott Hall Road makes up the eastern border. The area consists of complex road junctions, Penraevon Industrial Estate and a number of warehouses thanks to the impressive transport links attractive to haulage companies. There are a number of upmarket car showrooms such as Jaguar Land Rover and Volvo.

The former public library building survives, and was the Leeds base for the West Yorkshire Archive Service, but closed some years ago. now a Games studio.

Throughout the winter months, Sheepscar is notable for its large gasholder. This is completely invisible throughout the summer as its storage tank is below ground. The second and older spiral guided gasholder was removed some years ago. Sheepscar gasholder station is the only one in Leeds never to have been used as a Gas Works.

== Sheepscar Interchange ==
Sheepscar is most notable for the Sheepscar Interchange where north Leeds' local roads meet. The A58 (road to Wetherby) and the Inner Ring Road and A61 (road to Harrogate) and Leeds city centre meet here. Both carry very large volumes of traffic, particularly at peak hours. It was because of this that the Sheepscar Interchange was constructed in the 1960s. The A58 carries less traffic than it did previously due to traffic using A1-M1 link.

The areas Sheepscar, Little London and Lovell Park are generally all referred to as either Sheepscar or Little London, Lovell Park being seen as an area of Little London. Sheepscar is an industrial area, while Little London and Lovell Park are residential.

Sheepscar Tannery was the largest tannery in the country in 1893, when it was run by John Joseph Willson of Willson, Walker & Co.

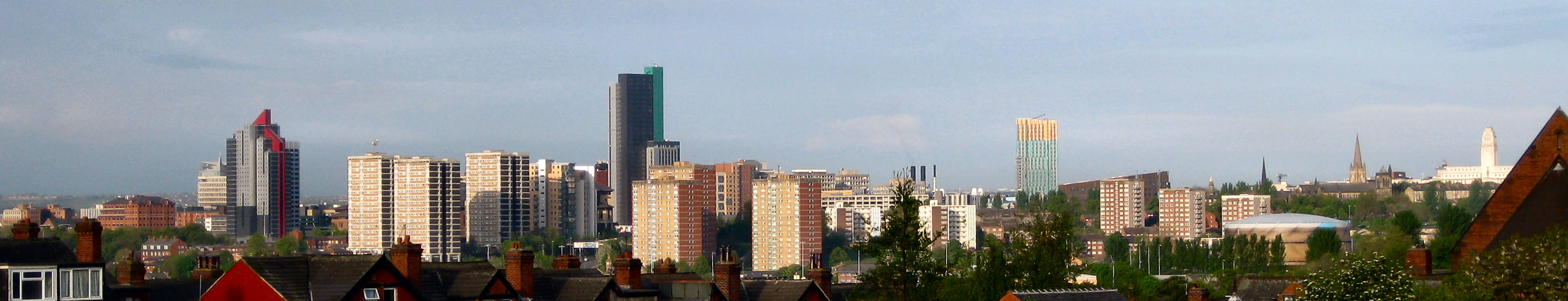
A view over Sheepscar, Lovell Park and Little London, taken from Banstead Park in Harehills.
