= Lovell Park =

Area of Leeds in West Yorkshire, England

Coordinates: 53.8038°N 1.5406°W

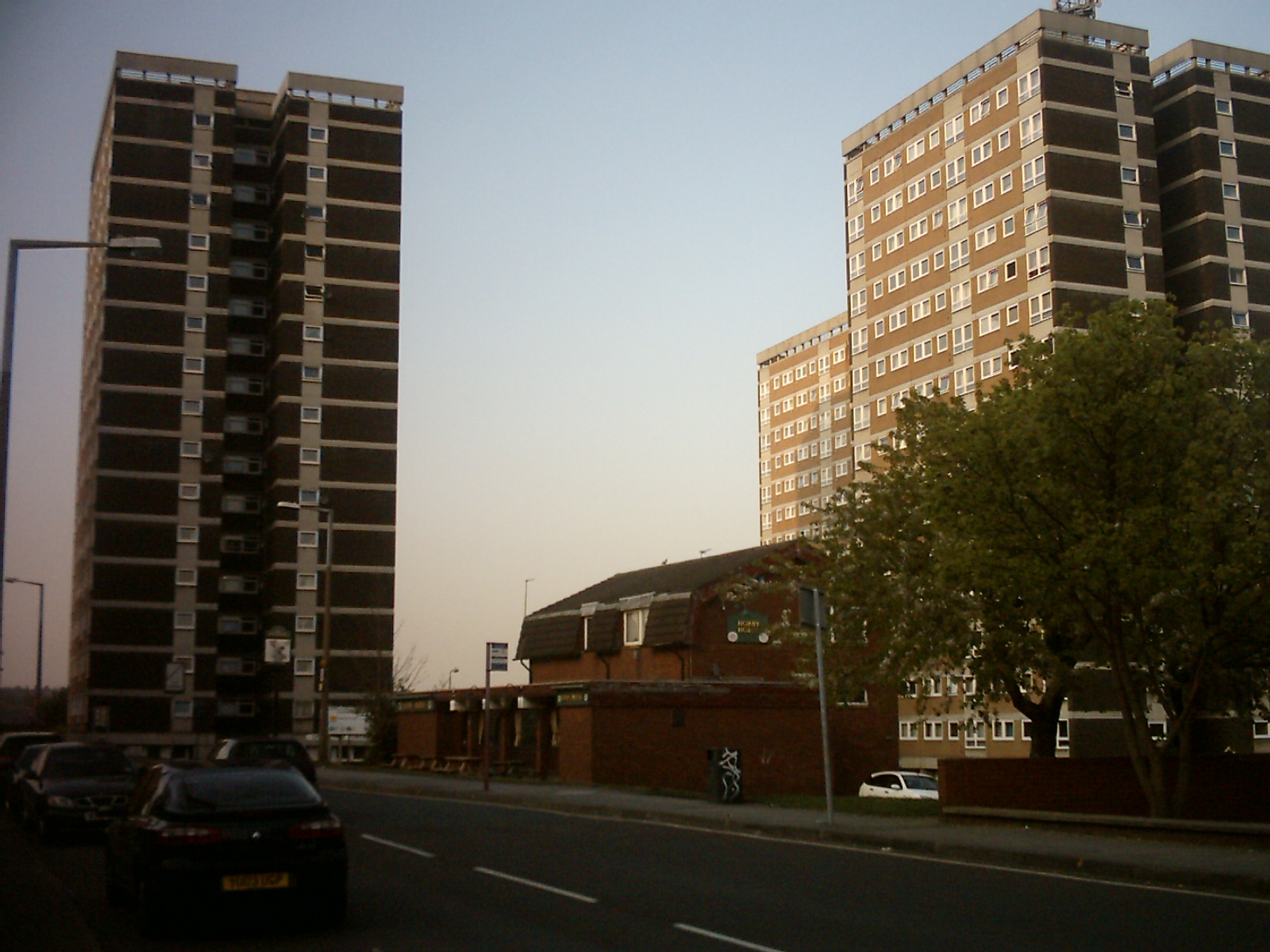
- Lovell Park Flats

- Location within West Yorkshire
- Metropolitan borough: City of Leeds
- Metropolitan county: West Yorkshire
- Region: Yorkshire and the Humber
- Country: England
- Sovereign state: United Kingdom
- Post town: LEEDS
- Postcode district: LS2 & LS7
- Dialling code: 0113
- Police: West Yorkshire
- Fire: West Yorkshire
- Ambulance: Yorkshire
- UK Parliament: Leeds Central and Headingley

Lovell Park is an inner-city area of Leeds, West Yorkshire, England. The area falls within the Little London and Woodhouse ward on Leeds City Council.

Lovell Park along with its adjacent areas Little London and Blenheim, is an area of 1960s high-rise and maisonette council housing situated between the city centre and Sheepscar.

The Londoner Public House in Little London was demolished in 2007 and a new 25-storey tower block, the Opal Tower, has been constructed on its former site. The only pub now remaining in Lovell Park is The Leeds Rifleman. The estate has only one shop, Lovell Park Stores, an independent newsagent/ convenience store/ off-licence. There are further shops within five minutes walk in the Merrion Centre, other parts of Leeds city centre and other parts of Little London.

In the 1990s the Leeds Permanent Building Society relocated its offices from what is now The Light in Leeds city centre, to a new building in Lovell Park. This now belongs to Lloyds Banking Group.

Lovell Park Towers was used for the filming of Married Single Other.

The site of Lovell Park itself was the site of a cattle market which dates back to before 1860.

== Gallery ==
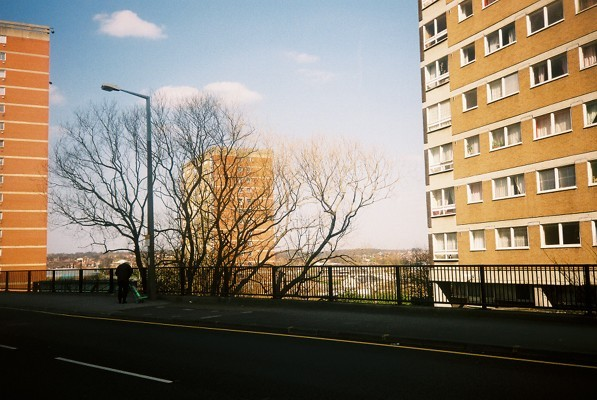
Oatland Flats, Lovell Park Road

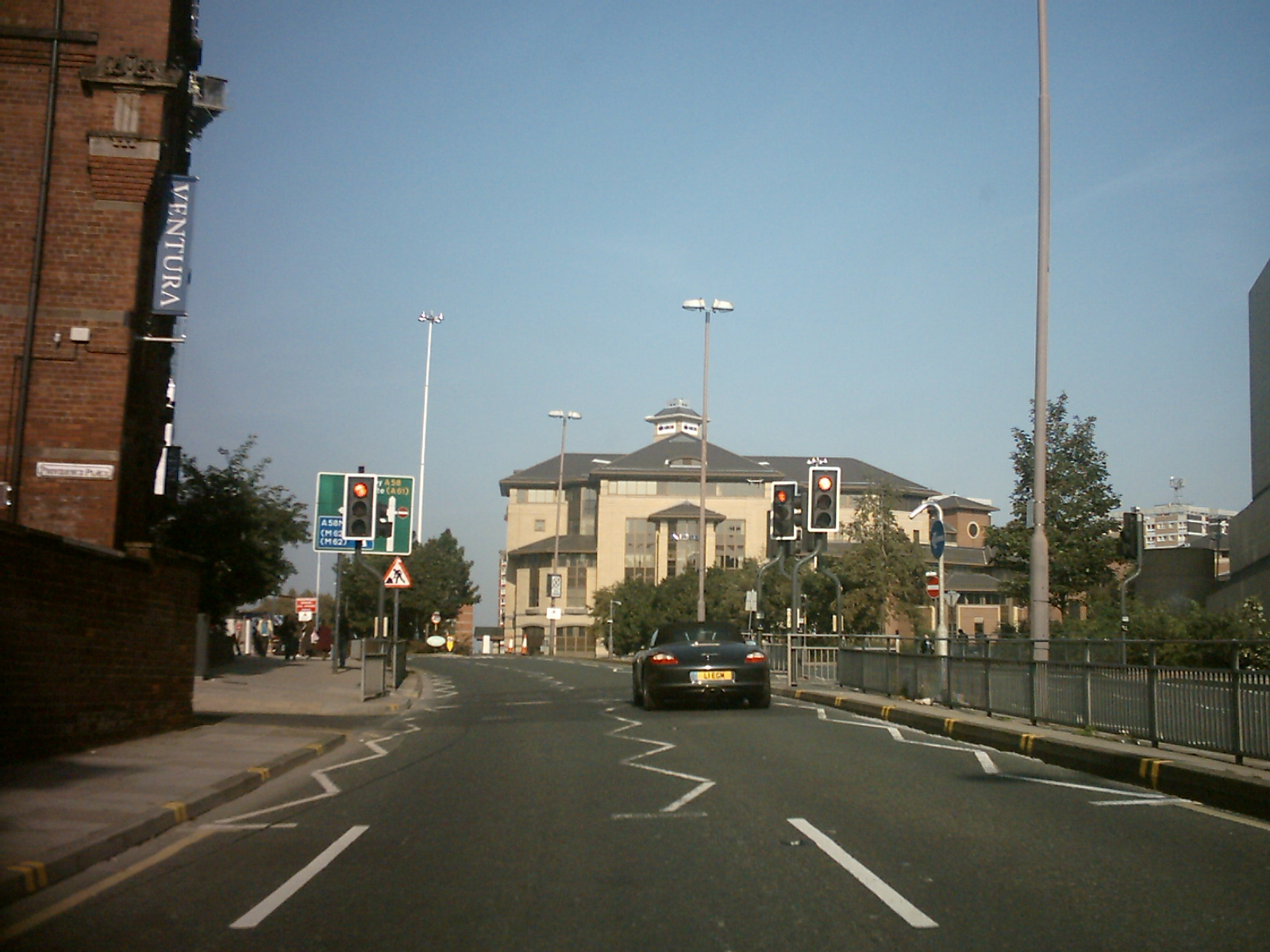
Lloyds Banking Group offices (formerly HBOS/Leeds Permanent Building Society)

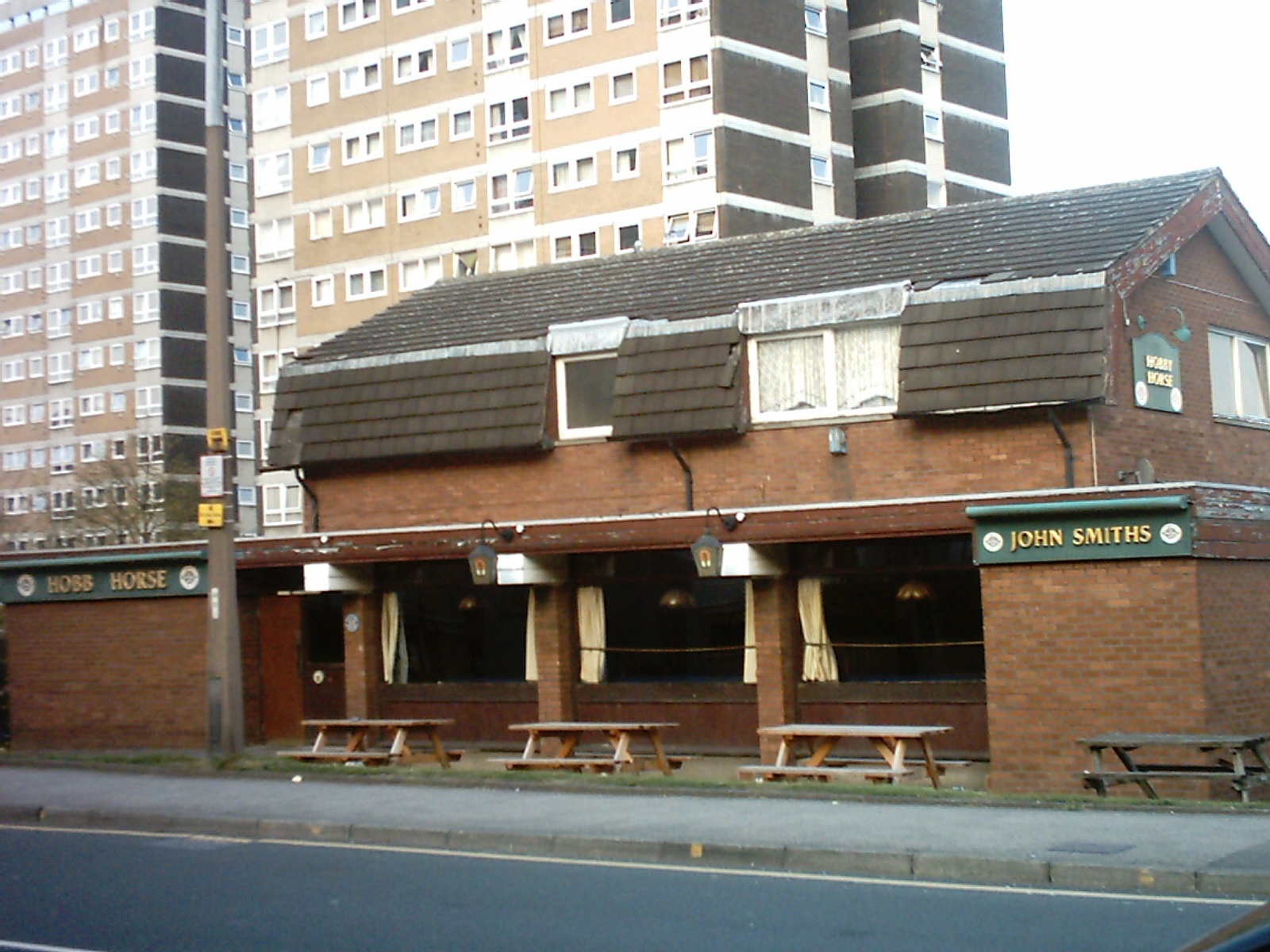
The Hobby Horse

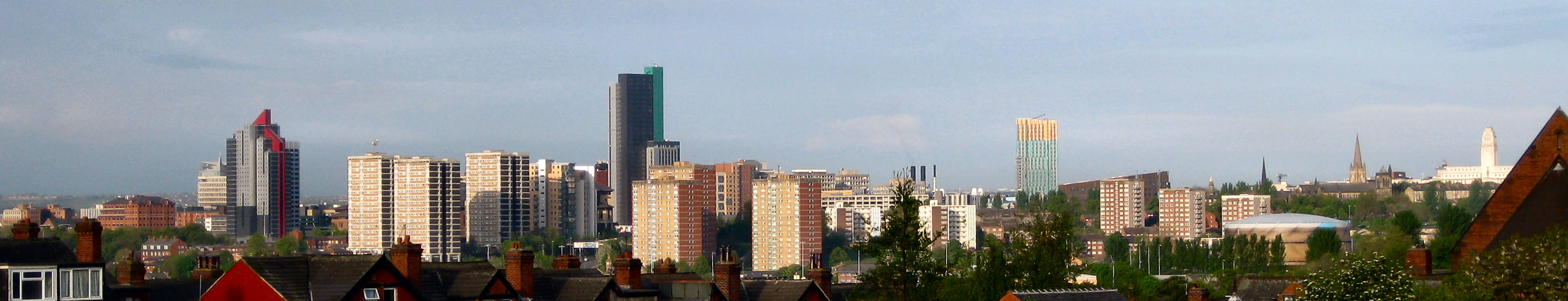
A view over Sheepscar, Lovell Park and Little London, taken from Banstead Park in Harehills.
