= Leeds Inner Ring Road =

Motorway and road in Leeds, England

Coordinates: 53.8009°N 1.5548°W

A64(M)

Route information
- Length: 0.5 mi (800 m)
- Existed: 1969–present

Major junctions
- East end: Quarry Hill
- West end: Brunswick

Location
- Country: United Kingdom
- Constituent country: England
- Primary destinations: Leeds

Road network
- Roads in the United Kingdom; Motorways; A and B road zones

A58(M)

Route information
- Length: 2.0 mi (3.2 km)
- Existed: 1964–present
- History: Constructed 1964–75

Major junctions
- East end: Brunswick
- West end: Armley

Location
- Country: United Kingdom
- Constituent country: England
- Primary destinations: Leeds

Road network
- Roads in the United Kingdom; Motorways; A and B road zones
← A57(M)	→ A64(M)

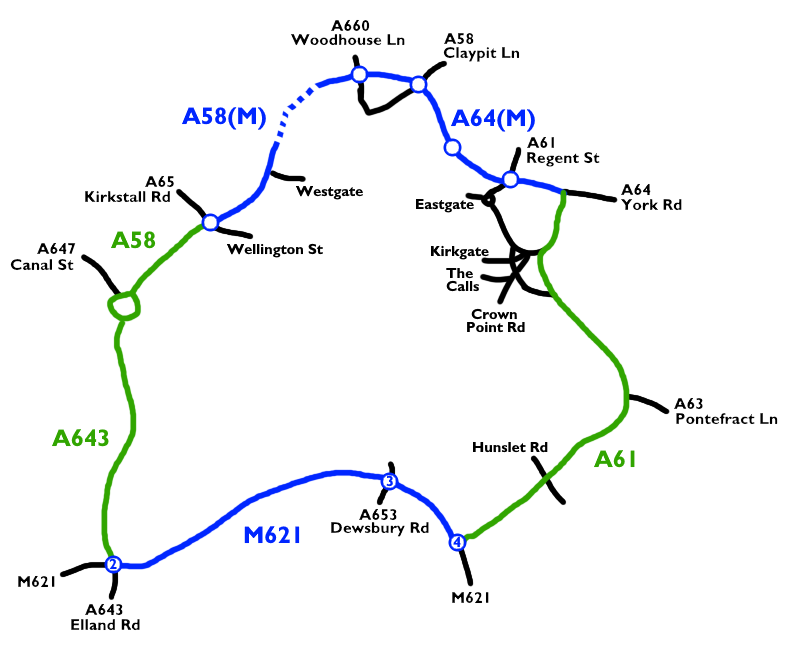
Map of the ring road shaded in blue and green

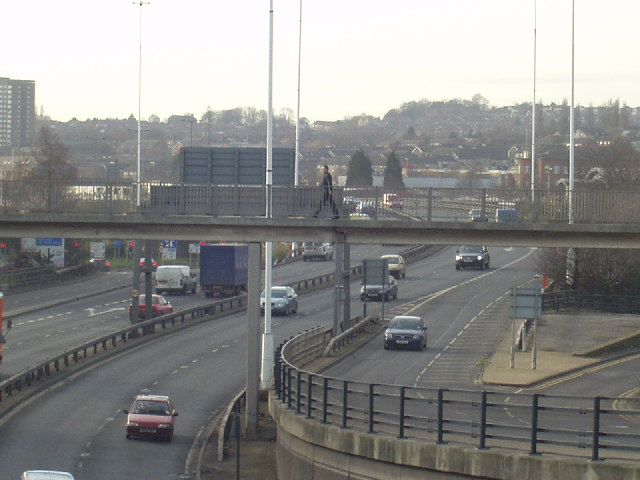
By the now closed Leeds International Pool.

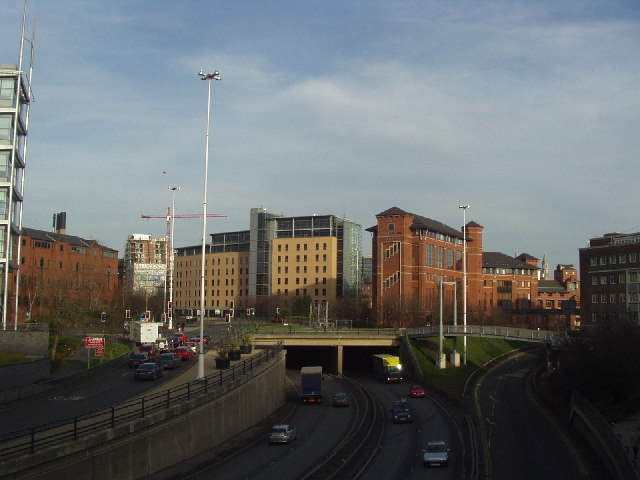
Passing under the Nuffield Hospital.

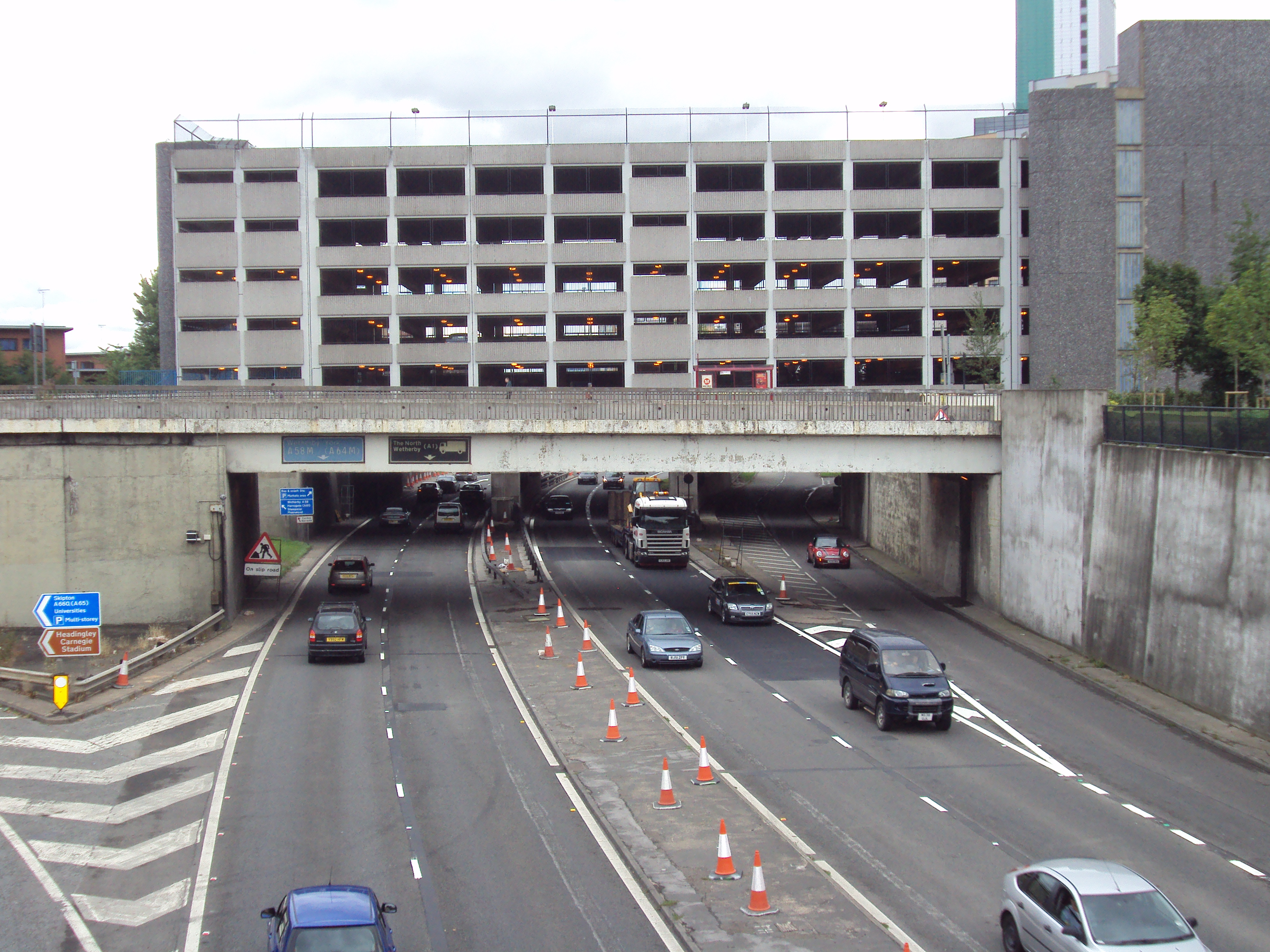
Passing under the Woodhouse Lane multi-story car park.

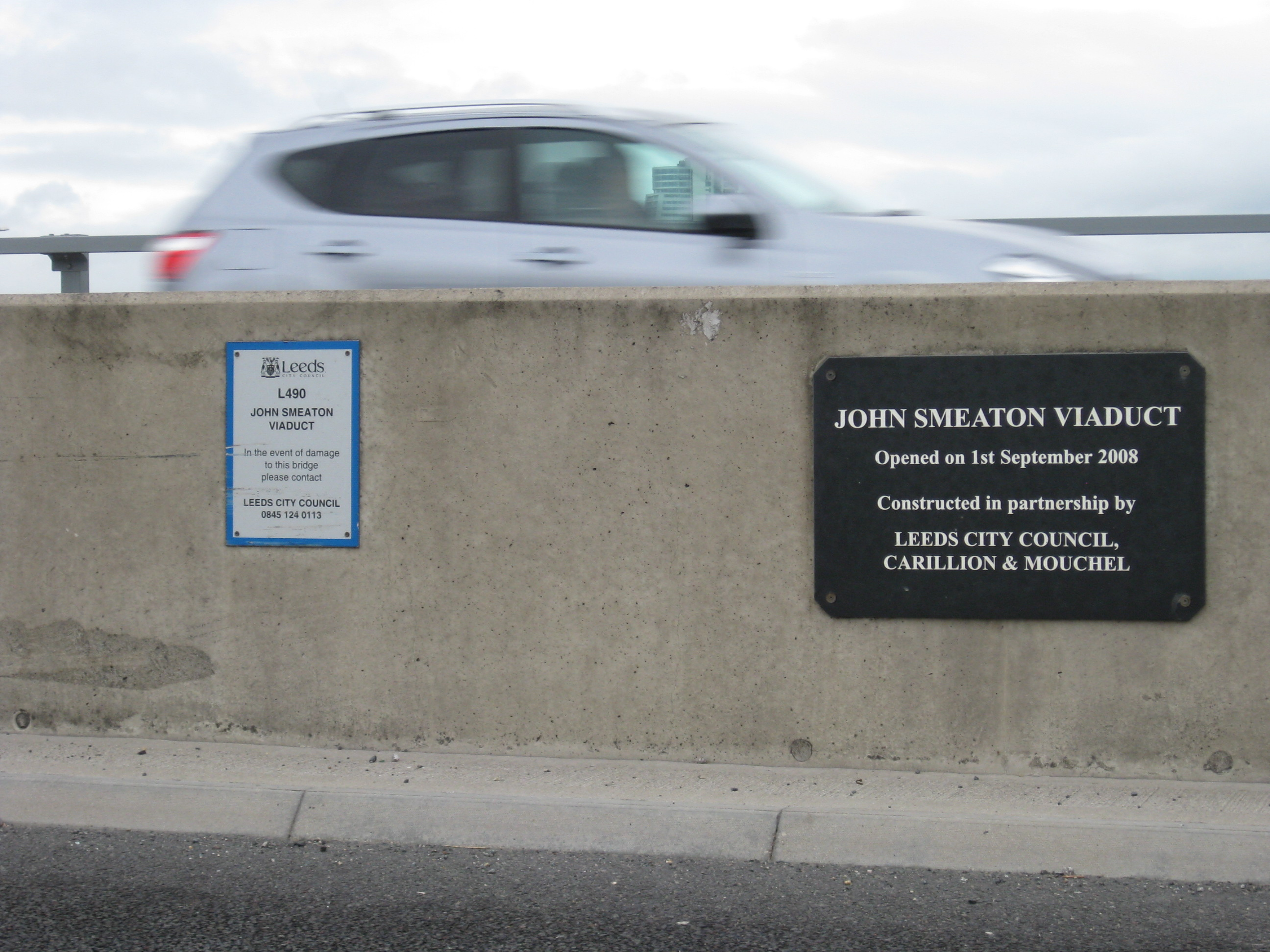
Signs on the John Smeaton Viaduct

The Leeds Inner Ring Road is part-motorway and part-A roads in Leeds, West Yorkshire, England, which forms a ring road around the city centre.

It has six different road numbers that are all sections of longer roads. Clockwise, the roads are the A58(M), a motorway section of the A58 road; the A64(M), part of the A64 road; the A61 between York Road and the M621; the M621 between junctions 4 and 2; and the A643 between the M621 and A58. The motorway section is in total is 2.5 miles (4.0 km) long and is subject to a 40 mph (64 km/h) speed limit throughout.

== Route ==
The motorway section of the ring road forms a semicircle around the north of the city centre. It is classified as a motorway to prohibit certain types of traffic and pedestrians but is not designed to modern motorway standards: it has no hard shoulders and many exits are unsuitable for a true motorway, including a right-side (fast lane) slip road exit. Most of it runs in a concrete-walled cutting, but it goes into a tunnel under the Leeds General Infirmary. The motorway cuts through inner-city neighbourhoods such as Woodhouse, Sheepscar, and Buslingthorpe, forming an important link in the road network by allowing traffic from the A65, A660, A58, A61 and A64 to bypass the city centre.

== History ==
Leeds suffered severe traffic congestion as it was on the main route joining Liverpool, Manchester, Bradford and Hull. In 1955 it was decided to build a dual carriageway to remove through traffic. In the final stages before construction began the road was redesignated as a motorway in 1963, without any changes to the design. Construction began with the demolition of 365 homes and 174 other structures.

Lehane, Mackenzie and Shand of Derbyshire was given the main contract in November 1968.

The motorway was built around the city centre in three stages in the 1960s and 1970s. Stage 1 opened was the route from the exit for the town hall to the A58 exit, stage 2 was the A64(M) section and stage 3 linked the road to the A58. Stages 4 to 6 featured upgrades to the A61 constructed in the 1990s to non-motorway standards featuring traffic light controlled intersections and non-grade separated junctions. When the motorway finally opened, Leeds used the motto Motorway city of the 70s.

The final stage of the inner ring road (stage 7) began construction in 2006 and opened in late 2008. Featuring a large elevated viaduct, it links the M621 at junction 4 with the previously constructed traffic light controlled interchange at Cross Green, Leeds is of a similar standard to stages 4–6.

The remainder of the Inner Ring Road is formed by using the M621 between junctions 2 and 4 and the A643 between Elland Road and the Armley Gyratory. It is not currently signposted as a complete route on the ground other than on the motorway section to the north of the city centre.

== Motorway section junctions ==
Note: both motorways have no junction numbers

A64(M) motorway junctions
Eastbound exits	Junction	Westbound exits
Road continues as A64 towards Seacroft The NORTH; York A64; Selby (A63)		Quarry Hill; Non Motorway Traffic
City Centre (M1), (M621); St James's Hospital, Bus and coach stations, Burmantofts, Harehills		Start of motorway
City Centre Loop; Harrogate A61; Wetherby (A58); Moortown, Roundhay, Chapeltown, Quarry Hill		City Centre; Harrogate A61; Wetherby (A58)
No exit		Skipton A660; City Centre, University, Multi Storey Car Park, Infirmary

A58(M) motorway junctions
Eastbound exits	Junction	Westbound exits
Wetherby A58; Harrogate (A61); Sheepscar, Meanwood		No exit
Skipton A660; University; Multi Storey Car Park		No exit
Civic Precinct, Infirmary		City Centre
Start of motorway		Ilkley A65; Leeds/Bradford; Rail Station
Ilkley A65; Leeds/Bradford; Rail Station; Non Motorway Traffic		Road continues as A58 to Armley (M621, M62, M1); Halifax A58; Bradford (A647); Huddersfield (A62)

== See also ==
- Leeds Outer Ring Road
