= Arthursdale =

Coordinates: 53.8331°N 01.4270°W

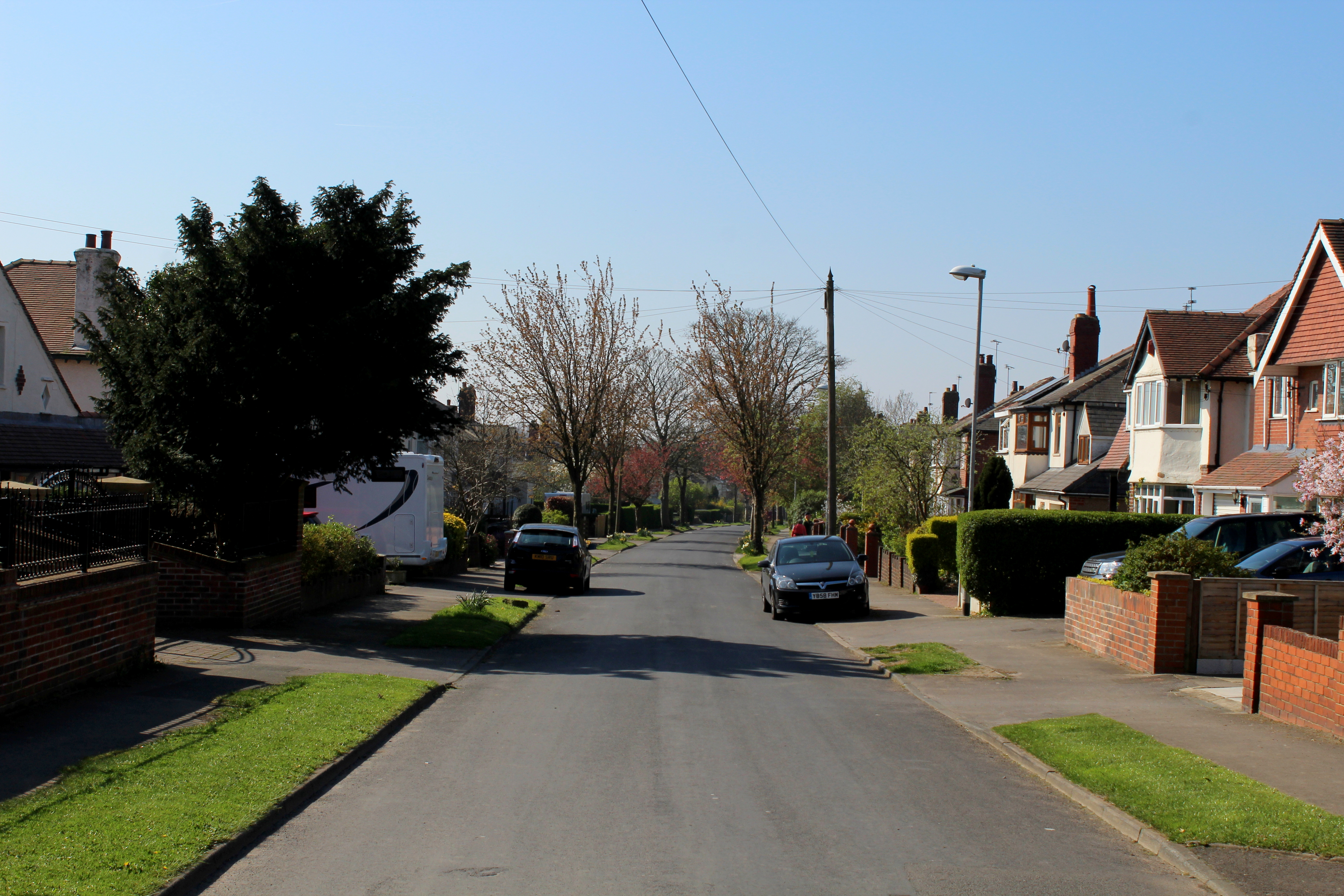
- Nook Road

- Location within West Yorkshire
- OS grid reference: SE3737
- Metropolitan borough: City of Leeds
- Metropolitan county: West Yorkshire
- Region: Yorkshire and the Humber
- Country: England
- Sovereign state: United Kingdom
- Post town: LEEDS
- Postcode district: LS15
- Dialling code: 0113
- Police: West Yorkshire
- Fire: West Yorkshire
- Ambulance: Yorkshire

Arthursdale is an area within the village of Scholes in West Yorkshire, England. It is a small area immediately to the north of Rakehill Road in Scholes, near the former Scholes station on the closed Cross Gates–Wetherby line. It was established around 1900 on glebe land bought by farmer, property developer and brick works manager Arthur Chippindale and included Whinmoor Farm. A cricket club named after the settlement was formed in 1929.

The glebe land on which the housing in the area is built was originally part of the wastes & common land of Whinmoor and was awarded to the Rector of Barwick in Elmet under the 1804 Barwick in Elmet Enclosure Award.
