= M621 motorway =

Motorway in England

M621
- M621 highlighted in blue

Route information
- Maintained by National Highways
- Length: 7.7 mi (12.4 km)
- Existed: 1972–present
- History: Constructed 1972–75

Major junctions
- West end: Drighlington
- M62 motorway M1 motorway
- East end: Rothwell

Location
- Country: United Kingdom
- Primary destinations: Leeds

Road network
- Roads in the United Kingdom; Motorways; A and B road zones
← M606	→ M876

The M621 is a 7.7-mile-long (12 km) loop of motorway in West Yorkshire, England that takes traffic into central Leeds between the M1 and M62 motorways.

== History ==
The first section of the M621 to open, known at the time as the 'South West Urban Motorway', extended from the M62 to junction 3 in central Leeds where it used to terminate at a roundabout which was also the terminus of the M1 motorway. This section opened in stages

=== First stage ===
M62 to junction 1 opened in 1971 (this was originally numbered M65).

=== Second stage ===
Junction 1 to junction 3 opened on 27 November 1973, known as Gildersome Street - Leeds. It finished at the Beeston Interchange.

=== Third stage ===
Construction started in December 1975 by A.F. Budge of Nottinghamshire, the Leeds South West Urban Motorway and Ingram Road Distributor, costing £5.5 million, 4 km (2.5 miles), to take 27 months.

=== Redesignation ===
When the M1 was diverted away from Leeds when the 'M1 – A1 Lofthouse to Bramham' extension opened in 1999 adjustments were made to junction 3 and the Leeds section of the M1 was re-designated as M621, given junction 3 to junction 7).

== Junctions ==
M621 motorway junctions
County	Location	mi	km	Junction	Destinations	Notes
West Yorkshire	Morley	0	0	— (Note: 53.7470°N 1.6456°W)	M62 - Manchester; A650 - Bradford; A62 - Leeds, Birstall	
West Yorkshire	Leeds	3.2	5.1	1 (Note: 53.7754°N 1.5820°W)	A6110 - Leeds ring road	
West Yorkshire	Leeds	3.9	6.2	2 (Note: 53.7800°N 1.5684°W)	A643 - Leeds	
West Yorkshire	Leeds	4.3	7.0	2a (Note: 53.7833°N 1.5553°W)	A58 - Beeston, Holbeck	Eastbound entrance only
West Yorkshire	Leeds	4.8	7.8	3 (Note: 53.7846°N 1.5470°W)	A653 - Leeds Centre, Beeston	
West Yorkshire	Leeds	5.2	8.4	4 (Note: 53.7808°N 1.5392°W)	A61 - Leeds Centre, Hunslet	
West Yorkshire	Leeds	5.6	9.0	5 (Note: 53.7747°N 1.5399°W)	A653 - Leeds Centre, Beeston	
West Yorkshire	Leeds	6.3	10.1	6 (Note: 53.7705°N 1.5337°W)	Belle Isle	Eastbound exit and westbound entrance only
West Yorkshire	Leeds	6.9	11.1	7 (Note: 53.7675°N 1.5146°W)	A639 - Leeds, Stourton; A61 - Robin Hood	
West Yorkshire	Leeds	8.0	12.9	— (Note: 53.7520°N 1.5163°W)	M1 - London	Northbound entrance and southbound exit only
1.000 mi = 1.609 km; 1.000 km = 0.621 mi: Incomplete access

*Ceremonial Counties

Coordinate list

== Gallery ==
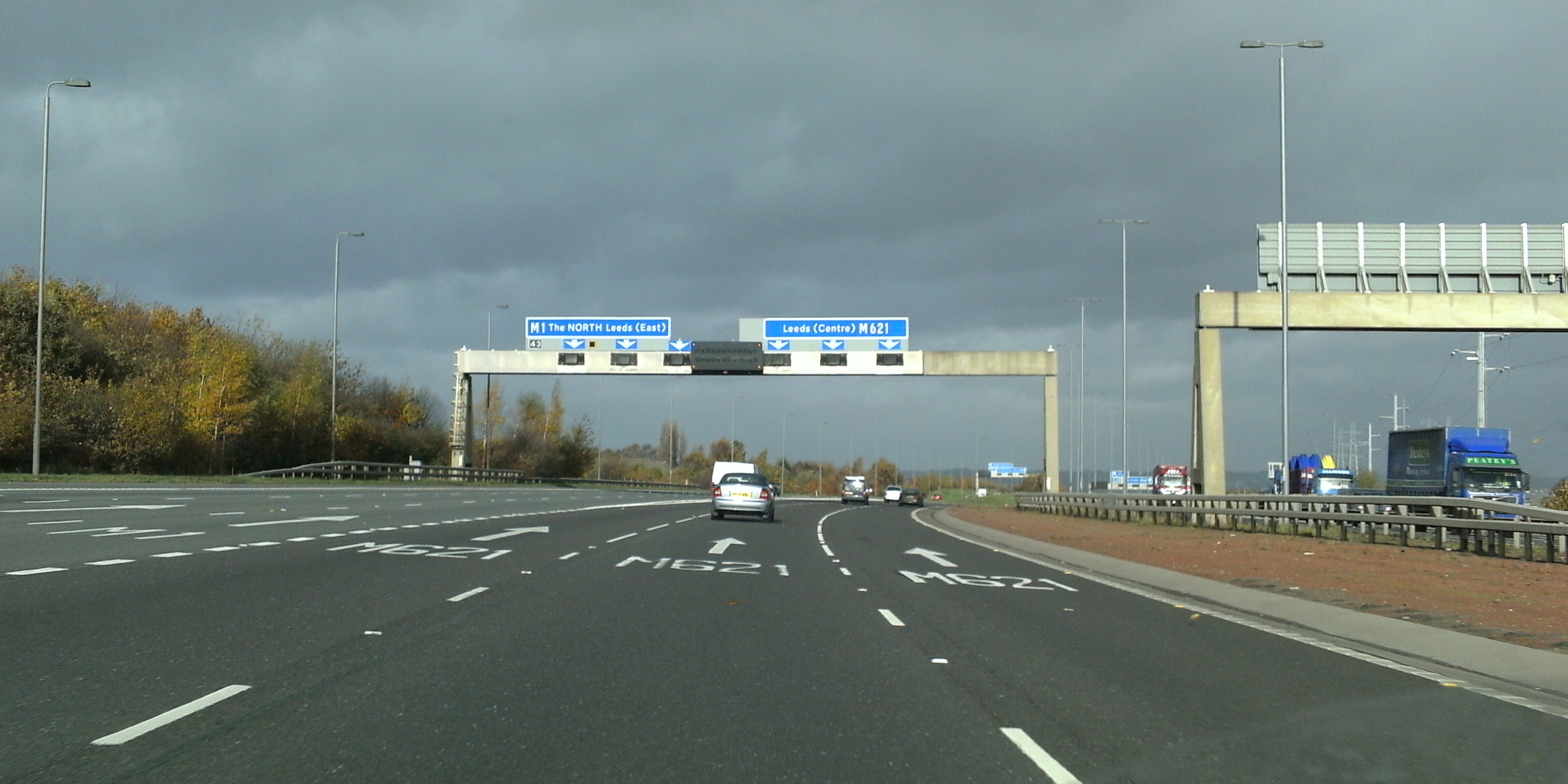
M1 and M621 interchange

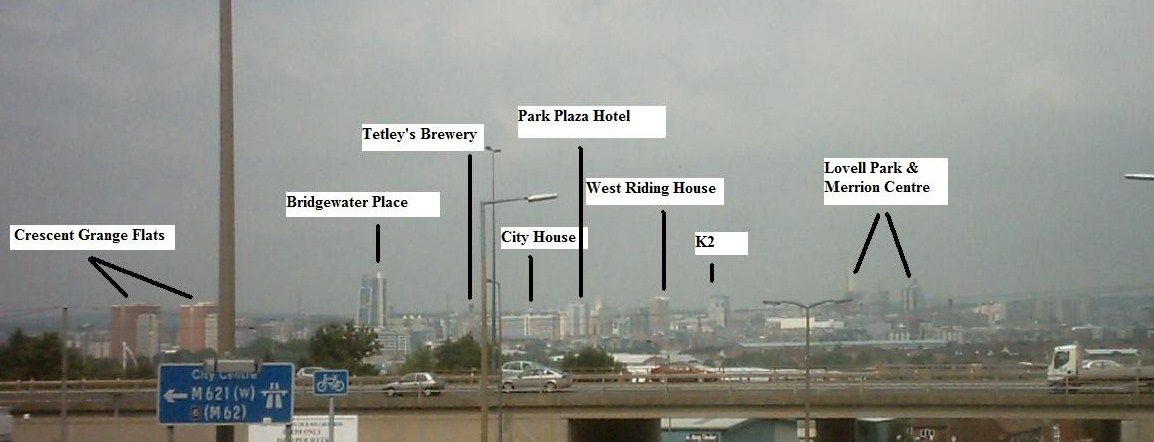
A view of central Leeds from the M621, Junction 6

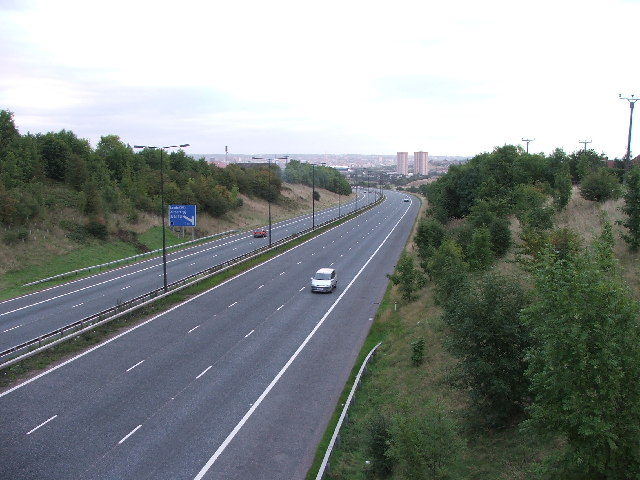
Looking north east with Leeds in the distance
