= A58 road =

Major road in northern England

Coordinates: 53.90499°N 2.15023°W

A58

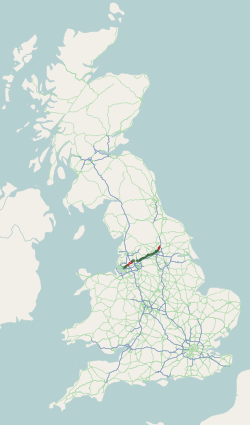

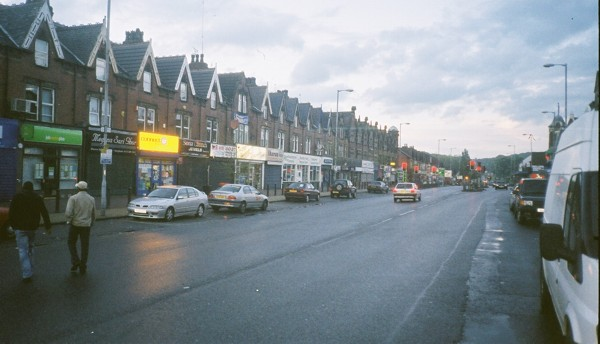
- Harehills Parade, A58, Roundhay Road, Harehills, Leeds (towards Wetherby)

Route information
- Length: 81.8 mi (131.6 km)

Major junctions
- West end: M57 / A57 in Prescot

- M6 in Ashton-in-Makerfield M61 near Bolton M66 in Bury M62 / M606 in Cleckheaton A58(M) in Leeds A64(M) in Leeds

- East end: A168 / A661 at Wetherby

Location
- Country: United Kingdom
- Counties: Merseyside; Greater Manchester; West Yorkshire
- Primary destinations: St Helens; Bolton; Bury; Rochdale; Halifax; Leeds

Road network
- Roads in the United Kingdom; Motorways; A and B road zones
← A57	→ A59

The A58 is a major road in Northern England running between Prescot, Merseyside and Wetherby, West Yorkshire.

== Route from West to East ==
Its westbound start is at Prescot on the outskirts of Liverpool via Greater Manchester and West Yorkshire to the eastern terminus at Wetherby. The road goes through the following locations:

- St Helens
- Ashton-in-Makerfield
- Hindley
- Westhoughton
- Bolton
- Bury
- Heywood
- Rochdale
- Littleborough
- The Pennines
- Ripponden
- Sowerby Bridge
- Halifax
- Hipperholme
- Birkenshaw
- Drighlington
- New Farnley
- Leeds City Centre as the A58(M) motorway (part of the Leeds Inner Ring Road),
- Scarcroft
- Bardsey
- Collingham
- to its terminus at Wetherby

== History ==
=== Rochdale to Bury ===
The section between Rochdale and Bury was turnpiked by the Rochdale and Bury and Sudden Roads Act 1797 (37 Geo. 3. c. 146).

=== Leeds to Wetherby ===
The original route between Leeds and Wetherby has a dual carriageway diverting from Roundhay Road/Wetherby Road, at the old Fforde Grene junction in Harehills. It runs along the Easterly Road dual carriageway passing Oakwood and Gipton. The re-routed A58 meets its original route at Boggart Hill in Seacroft. The re-routed section was constructed in the 1930s and had a branch of the Leeds Tramway running along the central reservation until the 1950s. The proposed Leeds Supertram was also to run this route.

== Junction list ==
County	Location	mi	km	Destinations	Notes
Merseyside	Prescot	0.0	0.0	M57 south to M62 – Liverpool (S), Widnes, Manchester A57 to B5199 north (Huyton Lane) / M57 / M58 – Prescot, Whiston, Kirkby, Bootle, Southport, Liverpool, Huyton	Western terminus; M57 junction 2
Merseyside	Knowsley– Prescot boundary	1.1	1.8	Prescot	
Merseyside	St Helens	3.9	6.3	A570 north (Kirkland Street) / A571 north (King Street) to A580 – Southport, Rainford, Wigan, Moss Bank	To A580 signed westbound only; western terminus of A570 concurrency; southern terminus of A571
Merseyside	St Helens	4.5	7.2	A570 south (St Helens Linkway) to M62 / A557 / A57 – Widnes, Warrington	A570 signed eastbound only; eastern terminus of A570 concurrency
Merseyside	St Helens	5.2	8.4	A572 east (Parr Stocks Road) – Newton-le-Willows, Parr	Western terminus of A572
Merseyside	St Helens	6.9	11.1	A599 east (Vicarage Road) – Haydock	Western terminus of A599
Merseyside	St Helens	7.2	11.6	A580 (East Lancashire Road) to M6 south / M57 – Liverpool, Manchester	
Greater Manchester	Ashton-in-Makerfield	8.9– 9.0	14.3– 14.5	M6 north – Preston	M6 junction 24
Greater Manchester	Ashton-in-Makerfield	9.6	15.4	A49 (Bryn Street / Warrington Road) / M6 / A580 – Wigan, Warrington, Liverpool, Manchester	Brief concurrency; Liverpool signed eastbound only
Greater Manchester	Ashton-in-Makerfield	9.8	15.8	Wigan Road (A5062 northwest to A49 – Wigan	Southeastern terminus of A5062
Greater Manchester	Platt Bridge	12.4	20.0	A573 south – Warrington, Golborne, Abram	Abram signed eastbound only; western terminus of A573 concurrency
Greater Manchester	Platt Bridge	12.6	20.3	A573 north (Warrington Road) – Wigan, Ince	Information signed westbound only; eastern terminus of A573 concurrency
Greater Manchester	Hindley	14.0	22.5	A577 (Wigan Road / Atherton Road) – Wigan, Leigh, Ince, Atherton	
Greater Manchester	Westhoughton	18.0	29.0	A6 (Manchester Road) to A579 – Chorley, Walkden, Leigh	
Greater Manchester	Westhoughton– Bolton boundary	18.5	29.8	M61 / M60 / M62 – Preston, Manchester, Leeds, Liverpool	M61 junction 5
Greater Manchester	Bolton	19.3	31.1	A676 north (Wigan Road) – Town centre	Southern terminus of A676
Greater Manchester	Bolton	20.7	33.3	A673 (Chorley New Road) to A6027 – Town centre, Horwich, Chorley	Information signed eastbound only
Greater Manchester	Bolton	23.0	37.0	A6099 southeast (Halliwell Road) / Smithills Dean Road – Town centre, Halliwell	Northwestern terminus of A6099
Greater Manchester	Bolton	23.9	38.5	A666 (Blackburn Road) to M65 / M60 – Blackburn, Burnley, Bolton	
Greater Manchester	Bolton	24.8	39.9	A676 (Tonge Moor Road) – Town centre, Ramsbottom	
Greater Manchester	Bolton	26.1	42.0	A579 south (Bury Road) to M60 – Town centre, Leigh, Manchester	Leigh and Manchester signed westbound only; northern terminus of A579
Greater Manchester	Bury	27.4	44.1	A665 south (Radcliffe Moor Road) – Radcliffe	Northern terminus of A665
Greater Manchester	Bury	30.4	48.9	A56 east (Peel Way) to B6222 – Edenfield, Rochdale	Western terminus of A56 concurrency
Greater Manchester	Bury	30.7	49.4	A56 west (Manchester Road) – Manchester	Eastern terminus of A56 concurrency
Greater Manchester	Bury	31.3	50.4	Derby Way to A56 – Edenfield	
Greater Manchester	Bury	32.0	51.5	M66 to M60 / M62 – Burnley, Blackburn, Manchester, Leeds, Liverpool	Liverpool signed westbound only; M66 junction 2
Greater Manchester	Heywood	34.3	55.2	A6046 south (Church Street) to M62 – Manchester, Middleton	Information signed eastbound only; northern terminus of A6046
Greater Manchester	Heywood	34.6	55.7	A6047 west (Rochdale Road) to A6046 / M62 – Manchester, Middleton	Information signed westbound only; eastern terminus of A6047
Greater Manchester	Rochdale	36.3	58.4	Manchester Road to A664 south – Manchester, Middleton, Castleton	Information signed westbound only
Greater Manchester	Rochdale	36.5	58.7	Edinburgh Way / B6452 to A627(M) / M62 / A680 – Manchester, Oldham, Blackburn, Norden	
Greater Manchester	Rochdale	37.2	59.9	A640 east (Drake Street) – Huddersfield	Western terminus of A640
Greater Manchester	Rochdale	37.4	60.2	A6060 north (Dane Street) / The Esplanade to A680 – Town centre, Blackburn	Southern terminus of A6060
Greater Manchester	Rochdale	37.7	60.7	A680 north (Spotland Road) / Hunter's Lane – Blackburn	Southern terminus of A680
Greater Manchester	Rochdale	38.0	61.2	A671 (Whitworth Road) to A640 – Burnley, Oldham, Huddersfield	
Greater Manchester	Rochdale	38.9	62.6	A664 south to M62 / A640 / A671 / A6193 – Huddersfield, Manchester, Oldham	To A640 and Huddersfield signed eastbound only, To A671, A6193, Manchester and Oldham westbound only; northern terminus of A664
Greater Manchester	Littleborough	41.1	66.1	A6033 north (Todmorden Road) – Todmorden	Southern terminus of A6033
West Yorkshire	Ripponden	48.5	78.1	A672 southwest (Oldham Road) to M62 – Oldham	Information signed westbound only; northeastern terminus of A672
West Yorkshire	Sowerby Bridge	51.6	83.0	Tuel Lane (A6139 north) to A646 – Burnley, Todmorden	Southern terminus of A6139
West Yorkshire	Sowerby Bridge	51.9	83.5	A6026 east (Wakefield Road) to A629 / B6112 – Elland, Greetland, Brighouse, Copley	Information signed eastbound only; western terminus of A6026
West Yorkshire	Sowerby Bridge	52.0	83.7	Pye Nest Road (A6142 east)	Western terminus of A6142
West Yorkshire	Halifax	52.6	84.7	A6142 west (Pye Nest Road) – Rochdale, Oldham, Sowerby Bridge	Information signed westbound only; eastern terminus of A6142
West Yorkshire	Halifax	53.0	85.3	A646 (Burnley Road / Skircoat Moor Road) to A629 – Burnley, Huddersfield, Hebden Bridge, Todmorden, Elland	
West Yorkshire	Halifax	54.2	87.2	A629 (Ovenden Road / Orange Street) to M62 – Halifax, Huddersfield, Manchester, Elland, Denholme	Ovenden signed eastbound only, Town centre, Manchester, Elland and Delholme westbound only
West Yorkshire	Halifax	54.4– 54.6	87.5– 87.9	A647 east / Charlestown Road – Town centre, Queensbury	Western terminus of A647
West Yorkshire	Halifax	55.5	89.3	A6036 east (Bradford Road) – Bradford	Western terminus of A6036
West Yorkshire	Hipperholme	56.7	91.2	A644 (Denholme Gate Road / Brighouse Road) to M62 / A629 – Keighley, Brighouse	To A629 signed westbound only
West Yorkshire	Hipperholme	56.7	91.2	A649 east (Wakefield Road) to A638 – Dewsbury, Lightcliffe, Bailiff Bridge	Lightcliffe and Bailiff Bridge signed eastbound only; western terminus of A649
West Yorkshire	Wyke	58.4	94.0	A641 (Huddersfield Road / Bradford Road) – Bradford, Brighouse, Huddersfield	
West Yorkshire	Cleckheaton	60.4– 60.7	97.2– 97.7	M62 – Huddersfield, Manchester, Leeds, Hull M606 north – Bradford A638 south / Bradford Road – Dewsbury, Low Moor	Southern terminus of M606; northern terminus of A638; M62 junction 26
West Yorkshire	Birkenshaw	62.3	100.3	A651 (Bradford Road) to A652 – Bradford, Gomersal, Dewsbury, Batley	
West Yorkshire	Drighlington	63.1	101.5	A650 to M62 / M1 / M621 – Bradford, Wakefield	
West Yorkshire	Leeds	67.0	107.8	A6110 (Ring Road) / M621 / M62 / M1 / A647 / A653 / A650 – City centre, Bradford, Pudsey, Dewsbury, Wakefield	To A647, Bradford and Pudsey signed eastbound only
West Yorkshire	Leeds	68.2– 68.7	109.8– 110.6	A643 west / A62 west / M621 / M62 / M1 / A6110 – The West, Huddersfield, Halifax	To A6110 signed eastbound only, The West and Halifax westbound only; eastern terminus of A643 / A62
West Yorkshire	Leeds	68.5– 68.8	110.2– 110.7	A647 west (Canal Street) / Wellington Road (B6154) – Bradford, Wortley	
West Yorkshire	Leeds	68.8– 70.2	110.7– 113.0	see A58(M)	
West Yorkshire	Leeds	70.2	113.0	A660 northwest – City centre, Skipton, Headingley	Southeastern terminus of A660
West Yorkshire	Leeds	70.7	113.8	A61 north (Sheepscar Street North) – Harrogate, Moortown; A61 south (Sheepscar Street South) to M1 – Wakefield	No access from A58 east to A61 south or from A58 west to A61 north
West Yorkshire	Leeds	74.2	119.4	Ring Road (B6902) – Shadwell, Seacroft, Moortown, Cross Gates	
West Yorkshire	Leeds	74.7	120.2	A6120 (Leeds Outer Ring Road) to A1(M) / M1 / M62 / A61 / A64 / A660 – Harrogate, Skipton, York	To A61, A660, Harrogate and Skipton signed eastbound only
West Yorkshire	Collingham	80.1	128.9	A659 west (Harewood Road) – Otley, Harewood, Linton	Western terminus of A659 concurrency
West Yorkshire	Collingham	80.6	129.7	A659 east (Wattle Syke) – Tadcaster, Boston Spa	Eastern terminus of A659 concurrency
West Yorkshire	Wetherby	81.8	131.6	A168 (Privas Way) / Boston Road (A661 northwest) to A1(M) / A59 / A659 / B1224 – Town centre, Harrogate, York, Tadcaster, Boston Spa, Kirk Deighton, Spofforth	Eastern terminus; southeastern terminus of A661
1.000 mi = 1.609 km; 1.000 km = 0.621 mi: Concurrency terminus

== Gallery ==
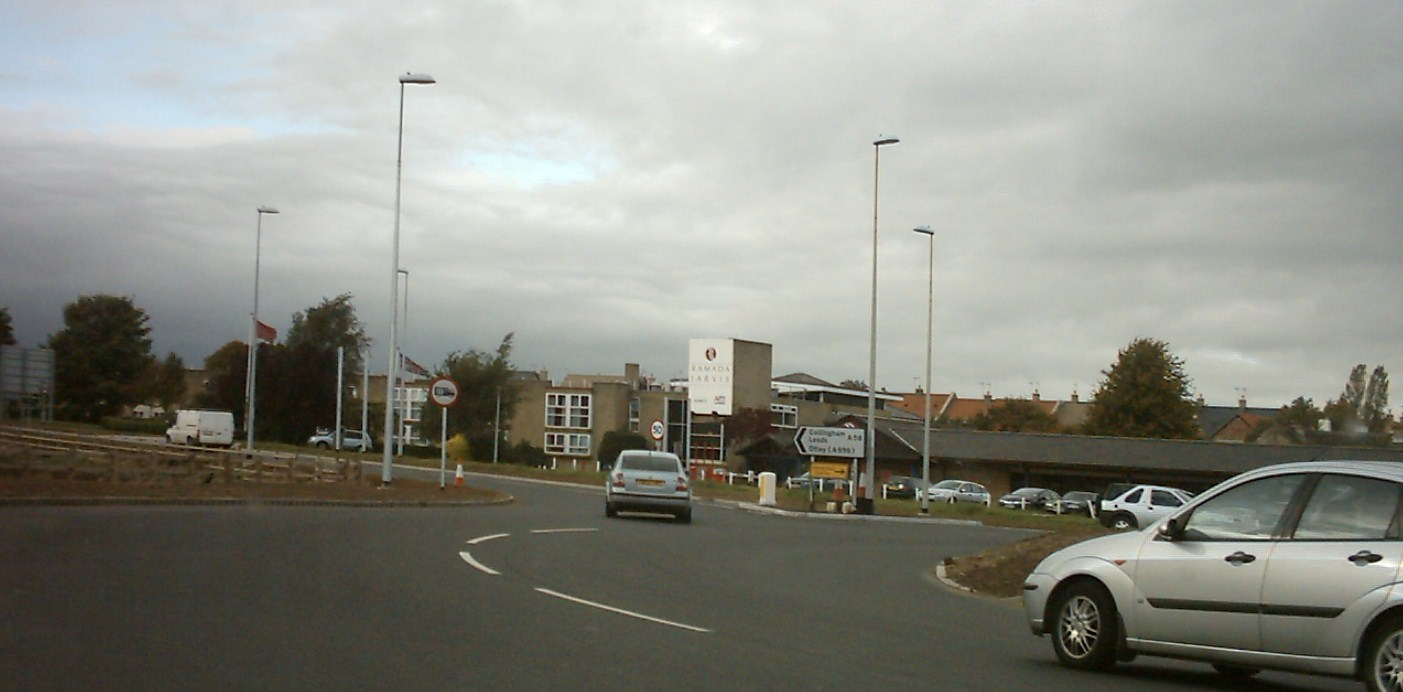
Terminus of the road in Micklethwaite, Wetherby, West Yorkshire

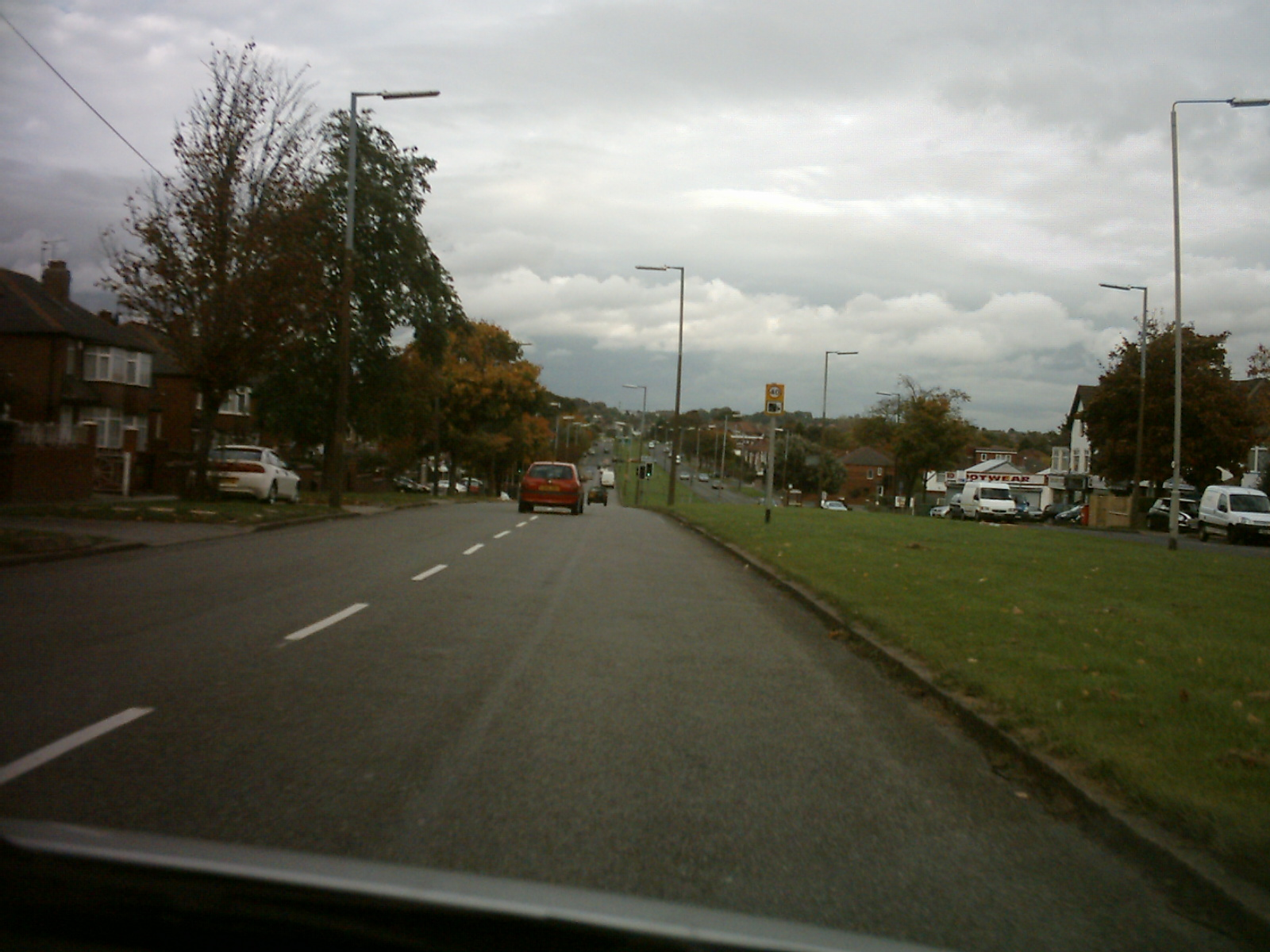
A58 easterly road separating Oakwood and Gipton in Leeds

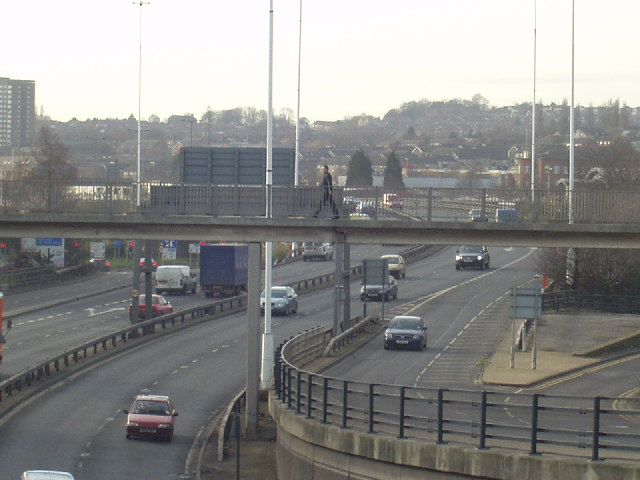
A58(M), Leeds Inner Ring Road by the Leeds International Pool

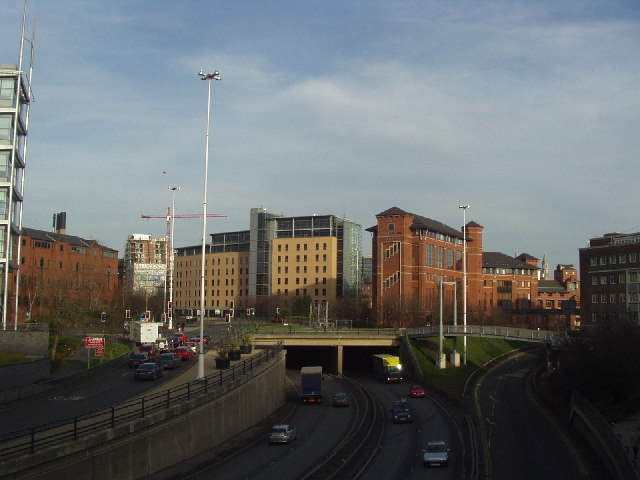
A58(M), Leeds Inner Ring Road passing underneath the Nuffield Hospital
