= St Lawrence's Church, Flaxton =

Church in Flaxton, North Yorkshire, England

Coordinates: 54°03′03″N 0°57′45″W

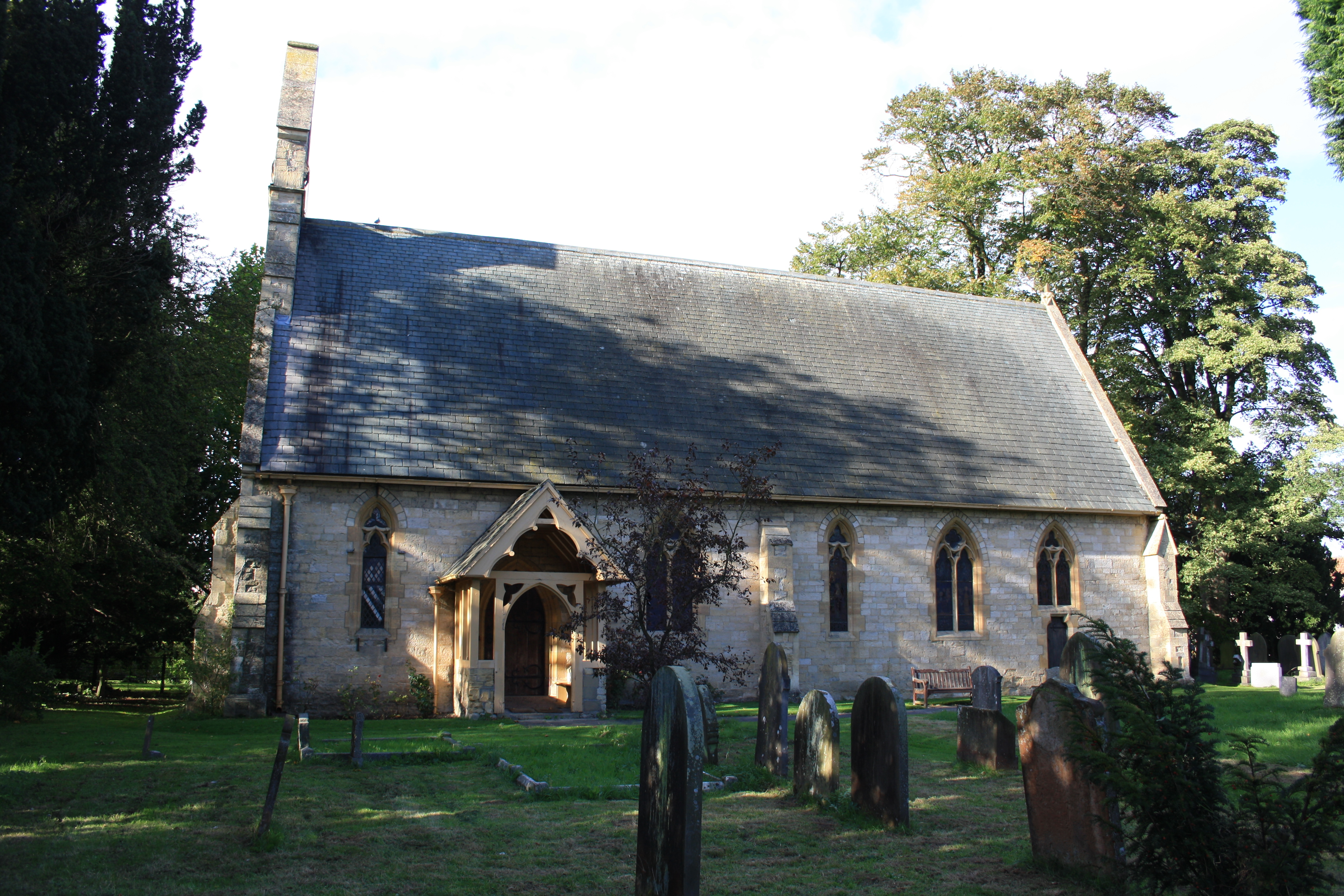
The church, in 2010

St Lawrence's Church is an Anglican church in Flaxton, North Yorkshire, a village in England.

Until the mid 19th century, Flaxton was divided between the parishes of St Botolph's Church, Bossall and All Saints' Church, Foston. A church was designed by George Townsend Andrews and was constructed between 1853 and 1854, in the style of a 13th-century Gothic building.

The church is built of stone and consists of a combined nave and chancel. There is a bellcote on the west gable end, with two bells. The windows are mix of Geometrical and lancets. One on the south side has stained glass designed by Jean-Baptiste Capronnier.
