= St Mary's Church, Sand Hutton =

Church in Sand Hutton, North Yorkshire, England

Coordinates: 54°01′07″N 0°56′28″W

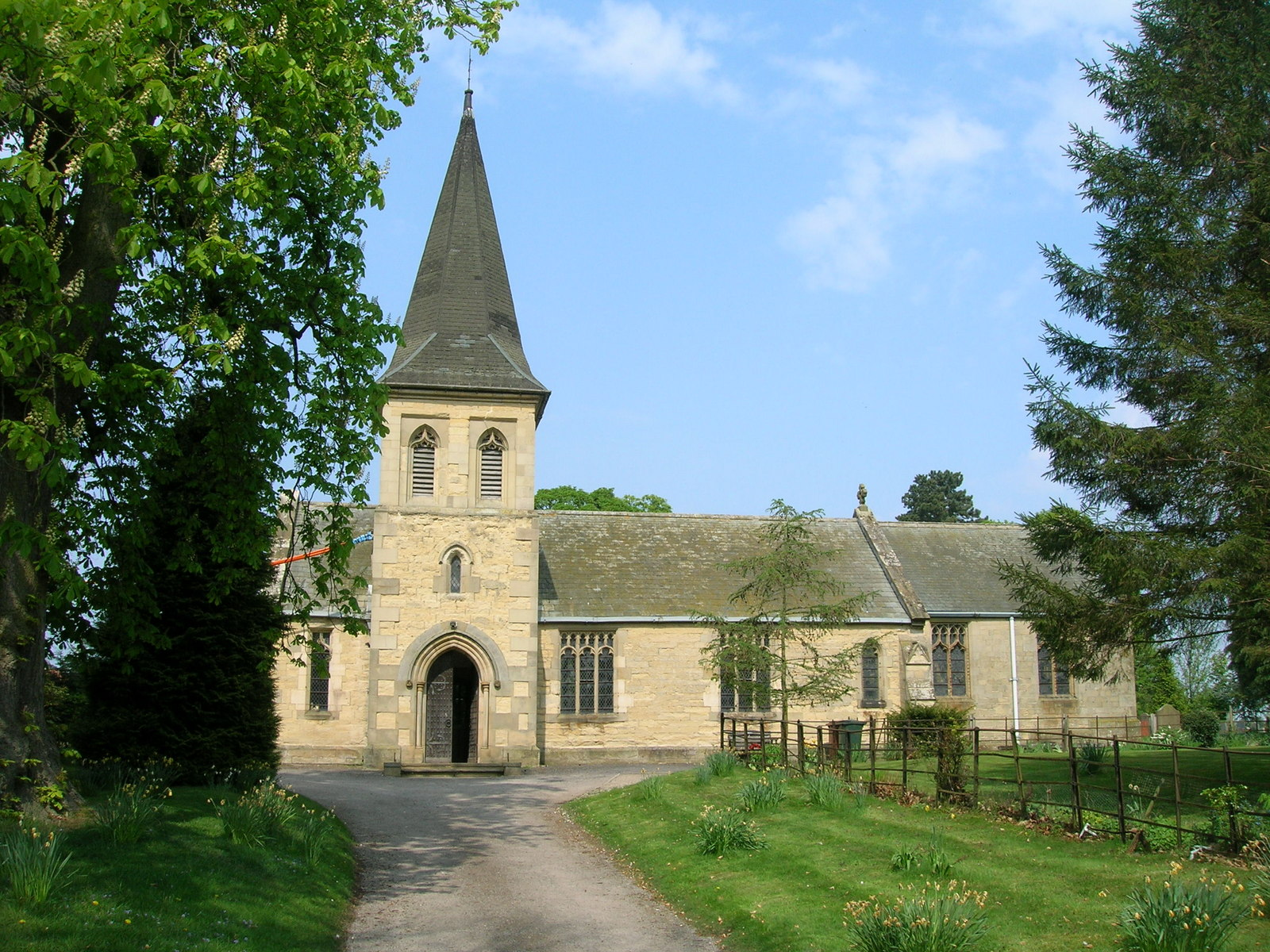
The church, in 2011

St Mary's Church is the parish church of Sand Hutton, a village in North Yorkshire, in England.

St Leonard's Church, Sand Hutton was a chapel of ease in the parish of St Botolph's Church, Bossall. From 1840 to 1842 a new church was constructed in its churchyard, to a design by Anthony Salvin, and dedicated to Mary, mother of Jesus. In 1861, it was given its own parish, which included the village of Claxton. From 1885 to 1886, the church was remodelled by C. Hodgson Fowler, the work including the addition of a choir. The church was grade II listed in 1985.

The church is built of sandstone, incorporating medieval fabric in the tower, and has a Westmorland slate roof. The church consists of a nave, a south steeple, a chancel and a north organ chamber. The steeple has a tower with three stages, containing a porch with a pointed doorway, a lancet window above, paired bell openings and a broach spire. Inside, there is a memorial to Deborah Read, who died in 1794.

== See also ==
- Listed buildings in Sand Hutton
