= Sand Hutton =

Village and civil parish in North Yorkshire, England

Coordinates: 54°01′04″N 0°56′24″W

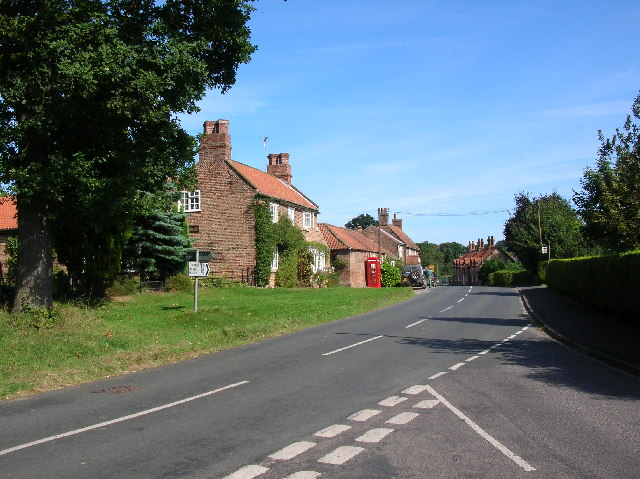
- Sand Hutton

- Location within North Yorkshire
- Population: 213 (2011)
- OS grid reference: SE695584
- Civil parish: Sand Hutton
- Unitary authority: North Yorkshire
- Ceremonial county: North Yorkshire
- Region: Yorkshire and the Humber
- Country: England
- Sovereign state: United Kingdom
- Post town: YORK
- Postcode district: YO41
- Police: North Yorkshire
- Fire: North Yorkshire
- Ambulance: Yorkshire
- UK Parliament: Thirsk and Malton

Sand Hutton is a village and civil parish in North Yorkshire, England, about 6 miles (10 km) north-east of York.

== History ==
The village is mentioned in the Domesday Book as Hottune in the Bulford hundred. Before the Norman invasion the manor was shared between Sprot and Gospatric, son of Arnketil. Afterwards they were split between the Crown and Hugh, son Baldric who installed Wulfbert of Hutton as lord of the manor. The latter part of the manor passed eventually to the Mowbray family until 1604 when the title became unused. The other part of the manor was in the possession of the Percy family of Kildale in the early 13th century. Other families that had possession included the Grays of York and the Thwaite family.

The manor was once owned by an eccentric Englishman, Sir Robert Walker, Bt. He had his own narrow gauge steam railway, which provided transport around his large estate, and a fire brigade.

The name is derived from Old English words hoh and -tun meaning a hill or spur of projecting land (hill) and settlement. The prefix Sand was added later to denote the type of soil in the area and distinguish it from other Huttons in the area.

== Governance ==
The village lies within the Thirsk and Malton UK Parliament constituency. It also lies within the Sheriff Hutton & Derwent electoral ward of North Yorkshire Council. Between 1974 and 2023 the village was part of the Ryedale district.

The civil parish shares a grouped parish council with the smaller civil parish of Claxton. The Parish Council has six members with representation split equally between the two villages of the Parish.

== Railway ==
Main article: Sand Hutton Light Railway

From 1922-1932, Sand Hutton was a station on and the main base of the Sand Hutton Light Railway, the passion project of Sir Robert Walker, 4th Baronet of Sand Hutton. The sole engine shed on the line was located here. From Sand Hutton, one could travel east towards Bossall and Barnby House, south to Warthill where interchange with the LNERs York-Beverley branch was available, and north (albeit via Warthill, as White Syke junction faced in the Warthill direction) to Claxton.

However, with the sustained decline of passenger traffic along the route due to increased bus competition, the closure of the line's single biggest traffic producer and the untimely death of Sir Robert Walker, the line's biggest patron, in 1930, the line closed in 1932. It was dismantled in 1933.

== Geography ==
The village is located almost halfway between the A64 and A166 to the east of York. The nearest settlements are Claxton 1.1 miles (1.8 km) to the north and Upper Helmsley 1 mile (1.6 km) to the south.

The 2001 UK Census, which separated the village records, recorded the population of Sand Hutton as 193, of which 158 were over sixteen years of age. There were 81 dwellings of which 54 were detached. By the time of the 2011 Census the population had increased to 213.

The Department for Environment, Food and Rural Affairs's Food and Environment Research Agency is sited at Sand Hutton.

== Amenities ==
There is a school, Sand Hutton CE Primary, which is in the catchment area of Huntington School in York for secondary education. It serves the villages of Gate Helmsley, Upper Helmsley, Buttercrambe, Harton, Bossall, Claxton and Flaxton. The school was built by Sir James Walker in 1861 and was enlarged by his grandson.

There is a community hall and is located in an area popular with shooting and other field sports. The village and most of the land is owned by the Church of England Commissioners, who bought it from the Walker family. Located east and west of the village there are numerous pits used for fishing. The Community Hall houses a small library.

== Religion ==
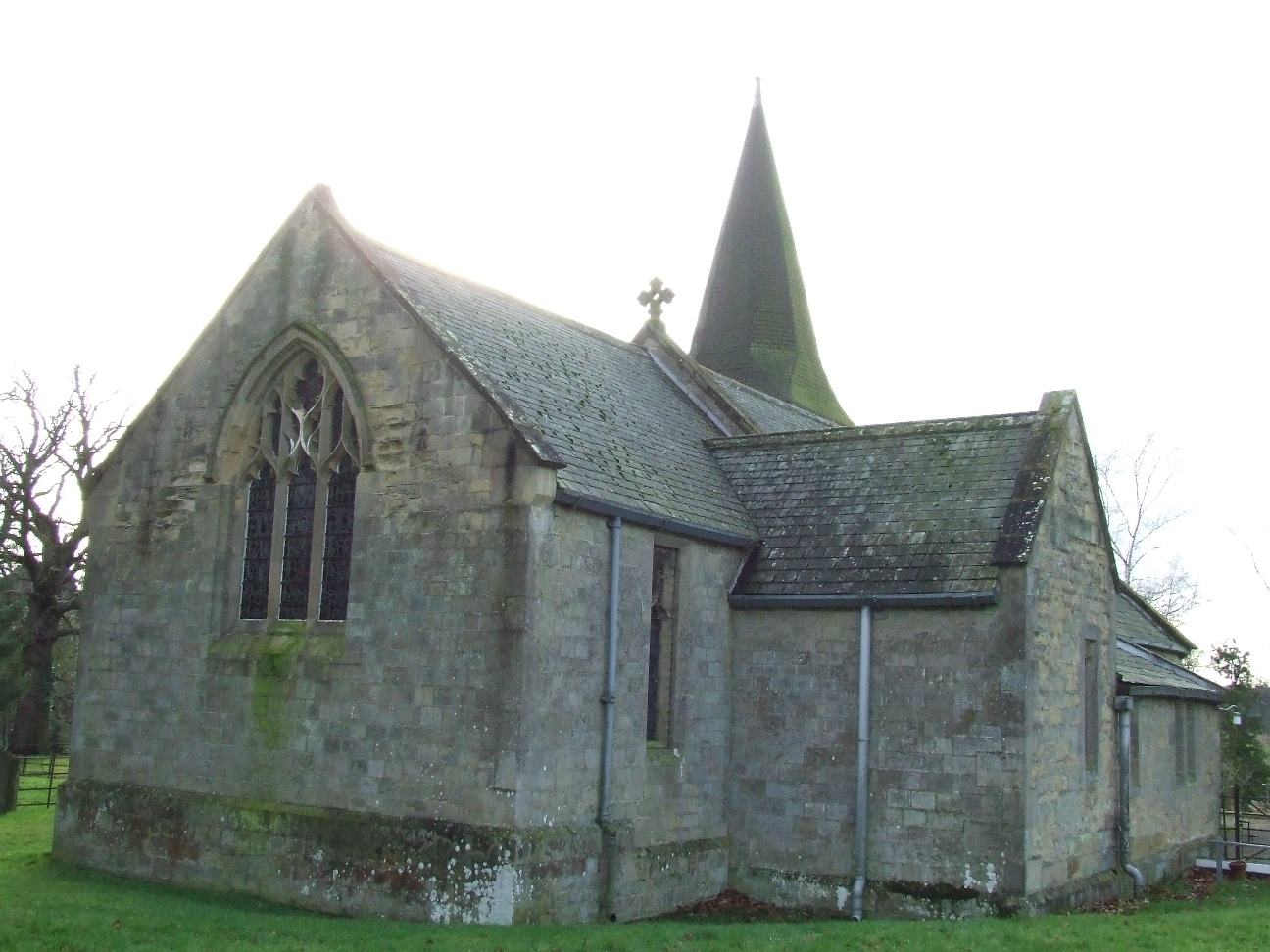
St Mary's in Sand Hutton

St Mary's Church, Sand Hutton was erected between 1840 and 1842. In the churchyard are the remains of the 12th century St Leonard's Church. Both are Grade II Listed buildings.

== See also ==
- Listed buildings in Sand Hutton
