= Thornton-le-Clay =

Village and civil parish in North Yorkshire, England

Coordinates: 54.07741°N 0.95417°W

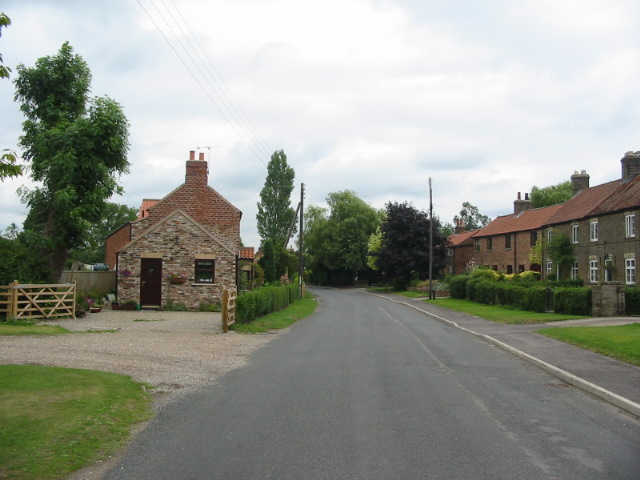
- Thornton-le-Clay

- Location within North Yorkshire
- Population: 209 (2011 census)
- OS grid reference: SE685651
- Unitary authority: North Yorkshire
- Ceremonial county: North Yorkshire
- Region: Yorkshire and the Humber
- Country: England
- Sovereign state: United Kingdom
- Post town: YORK
- Postcode district: YO60
- Police: North Yorkshire
- Fire: North Yorkshire
- Ambulance: Yorkshire
- UK Parliament: Thirsk and Malton

Thornton-le-Clay is a village and civil parish in North Yorkshire, England. It is about 8 miles (13 km) north-east of York.

== History ==
The village is mentioned in the Domesday Book as Torentune in the Bulford hundred. There are three references in total. The first as being part of Fostun manor; secondly as part of Bulmer manor and lastly as part of the Bolesforde Wapentac. The etymology of the name is Old English and means settlement enclosed by thorn bushes. The suffix relates to the nature of the soil in the surrounding area.

== Governance ==
The village lies within the Thirsk and Malton UK Parliament constituency. It is within the Hovingham & Sheriff Hutton electoral division of North Yorkshire Council. From 1974 to 2023 it was part of the district of Ryedale.

== Geography ==
According to the 2001 UK Census the population is 187. Of these, 157 were over sixteen years of age and 96 of them were in employment. There were 83 dwellings, of which 48 were detached. The 2011 Census showed a population of 209. Foston Primary School, built in 1844 but much improved and extended, is located on the outskirts of the village.

The nearest settlements are Foston, North Yorkshire 0.7 miles (1.1 km) to the east; Bulmer, North Yorkshire 1.8 miles (2.9 km) to the north-east; Flaxton, North Yorkshire 1.6 miles (2.6 km) to the south and West Lilling 2.1 miles (3.4 km) to the west.

== Religion ==
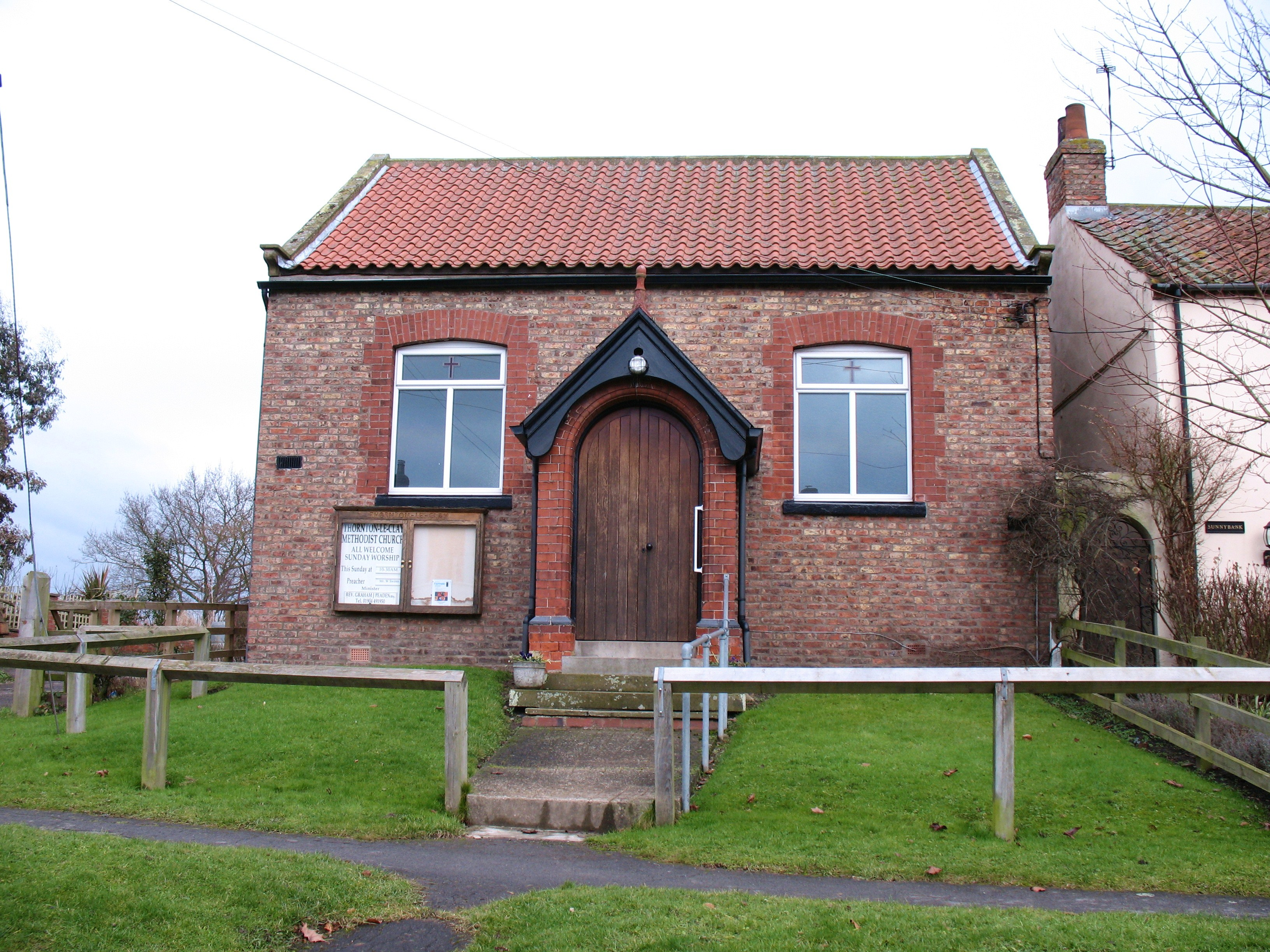
Methodist chapel, Thornton le Clay

A Wesleyan Chapel was built in the village in 1822 and a Primitive Methodist Chapel was built in 1858. The Wesleyan Chapel is still in use.

== Notable residents ==
The Rev Sydney Smith, rector of nearby Foston, lived at Thornton in the rectory which he is thought to have designed.
