= Listed buildings in Foston, North Yorkshire =

Foston is a civil parish in the county of North Yorkshire, England. It contains three listed buildings that are recorded in the National Heritage List for England. Of these, two are listed at Grade II*, the middle of the three grades, and the other is at Grade II, the lowest grade. The parish contains the village of Foston and the surrounding area, and the listed buildings consist of a church and two houses.

== Key ==
| Grade | Criteria |
|---|---|
| II* | Particularly important buildings of more than special interest |
| II | Buildings of national importance and special interest |

== Buildings ==
| Name and location | Photograph | Date | Notes | Grade |
|---|---|---|---|---|
| All Saints' Church; 54.07775°N 0.93296°W | | 12th century | The church has been altered and extended through the centuries, including the addition of a south porch in 1911. The church is built in limestone, gritstone, and sandstone, and has a roof of stone slate and tile. It consists of a nave, a north aisle, and a chancel with a north vestry, and on the west gable is a bellcote. The porch is timber framed and gabled, and contains a round-arched doorway with two moulded orders, detached shafts, the left fluted, with scalloped capitals and square abaci. Above it is a hood mould on beakheads, which is richly carved with medallions depicting various scenes and people. There is also a re-set Norman north doorway. | II* |
| Foston Rectory; 54.07512°N 0.95093°W | | 1813 | The rectory is in brick with a hipped pantile roof. There are two storeys, a main range with three bays, the end bay canted, and a lower service range of four bays. On the main range is a wrought iron porch, and the windows in both parts are sashes. | II* |
| Foston Hall; 54.07735°N 0.92994°W | | 1825 | The house, which incorporates earlier material, is in white brick, with a moulded cornice, and hipped Westmorland slate roofs. There are two blocks and a rear wing. The left block has two storeys and an attic, and two bays. It contains a canted bay window with a modillion cornice, sash windows, and a dormer in the attic. The right block is lower, with two storeys and two bays, and it contains sash windows. | II |
