= Claxton, North Yorkshire =

Village in North Yorkshire, England

Coordinates: 54.03309°N 0.94172°W

Claxton
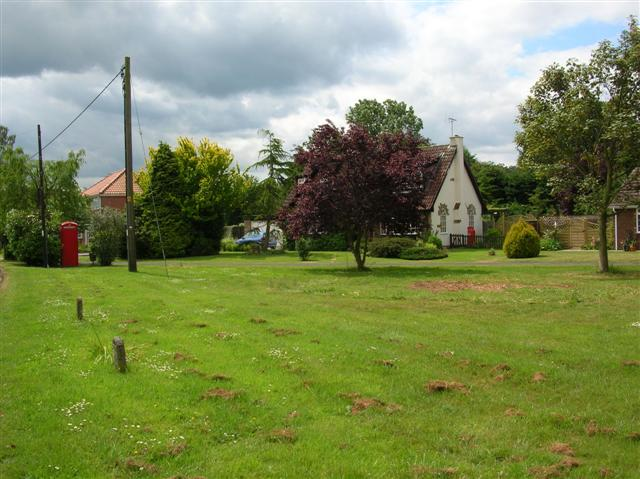
- Village Green, Claxton

- Location within North Yorkshire
- Population: 218 (2011 census)
- OS grid reference: SE694601
- Civil parish: Claxton
- Unitary authority: North Yorkshire
- Ceremonial county: North Yorkshire
- Region: Yorkshire and the Humber
- Country: England
- Sovereign state: United Kingdom
- Post town: YORK
- Postcode district: YO60
- Dialling code: 01904
- Police: North Yorkshire
- Fire: North Yorkshire
- Ambulance: Yorkshire
- UK Parliament: Thirsk and Malton

Claxton is a village and part of the Claxton & Sand Hutton civil parish in North Yorkshire, England. It is near the A64 road and 8 miles (13 km) north-east of York.

== History ==
The village is mentioned twice in the Domesday Book as Claxtorp in the Bulford hundred. The manor was split between Ligulf and Arnger and Gospatric, son of Arnketil before the Norman invasion. Afterwards the parts of the manor were passed to the Crown and Count Robert of Mortain who made Nigel Fossard lord of the manor. The Crown gifted some of the manor to St Mary's Abbey until the dissolution when it was granted to Thomas Bamburgh of Foston. It was held by the family until 1857 when it became the property of the lord of Sand Hutton manor.

The origin of the name of the village is uncertain. It could be from an Old Norse name of Clacc or Klakk. It could also be from the Old English word Clacc meaning hill or peak with the -tun suffix for settlement.

A Wesleyan Chapel was built in the village in 1842 and the Primitive Methodists built a chapel in 1850.

== Governance ==
The village lies within the Thirsk and Malton UK Parliament constituency. It also lies within the Sheriff Hutton & Derwent electoral ward of North Yorkshire Council Between 1974 and 2023 the village was part of the Ryedale district.

The Parish Council has six members with representation split equally between the two villages of the Parish.

== Geography ==
The village lies just off the A64 road and the nearest settlements are Sand Hutton 1.1 miles (1.8 km) to the south, Flaxton 1.5 miles (2.4 km) to the north-west and Harton 1.1 miles (1.8 km) to the north-east.

The 2001 UK Census recorded the population as 219 of which 172 were over the age of sixteen years. There were 102 dwellings of which 56 were detached. The population as of the 2011 census had only reduced marginally to 218.

== See also ==
- Listed buildings in Claxton, North Yorkshire
