= Foston Rectory =

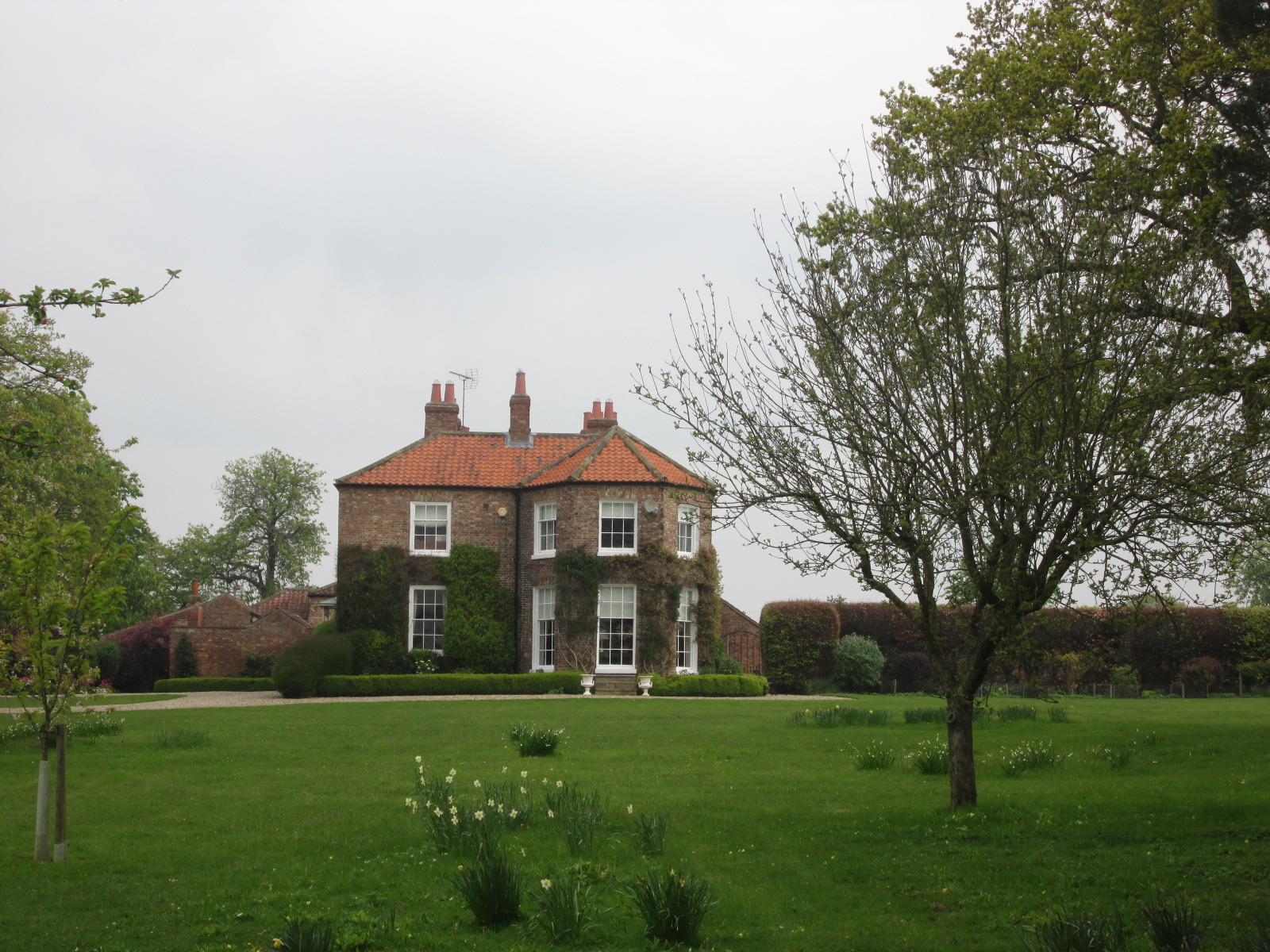
- Foston Rectory in 2017

General information
- Type: Parsonage
- Architectural style: Georgian
- Location: Foston
- Coordinates: 54°04′30″N 0°57′03″W
- Grid position: SE 68740 64859
- Construction started: 1813
- Construction stopped: 1814
- Client: Rev. Sydney Smith
- Owner: Private residence

Technical details
- Structural system: Brick construction

Listed Building – Grade II*
- Designated: 25 January 1954
- Reference no.: 1149629

Foston Rectory is a Grade II* listed building in the village of Foston, North Yorkshire, England. Built between 1813 and 1814, the house was designed by the writer and clergyman Sydney Smith, who served as rector of the parish.

== History ==
Sydney Smith was appointed as rector of All Saints' Church, Foston in 1806 by Lord Erskine. The parish had not maintained a resident minister for the preceding century, and the existing parsonage was uninhabitable. Following enforcement of the Clergy Residence Act 1803, Smith moved to Yorkshire in 1809, initially residing in Heslington.

After rejecting architectural estimates as cost-prohibitive, Smith designed the building himself and managed its construction. Work began in 1813 using local brick, and the rectory was completed in 1814. Smith lived at the property until his appointment to Combe Florey in Somerset in 1829.

== Architecture ==
The rectory is constructed of red brick with a hipped pantile roof and prominent brick chimney stacks. The plan comprises a two-storey main block and a lower two-storey service wing.

=== Exterior ===
The main south-facing front is three bays wide, with a canted bay on the right. The central doorway is sheltered by a wrought iron porch. Windows throughout the main block and four-bay service range are multi-pane timber sash windows set beneath flat brick arches.

=== Interior ===
The interior layout contains a drawing room, dining room, study, and an adjoining conservatory on the ground floor, with bedrooms above. The service wing accommodated the kitchen, scullery, and servants' quarters.

== Designation ==
The rectory was designated a Grade II* listed building on 25 January 1954 (List Entry No. 1149629).

== See also ==
- Grade II* listed buildings in North Yorkshire (district)
- Listed buildings in Foston, North Yorkshire
