= Bossall-Flaxton hoard =

10th century hoard of coins and objects

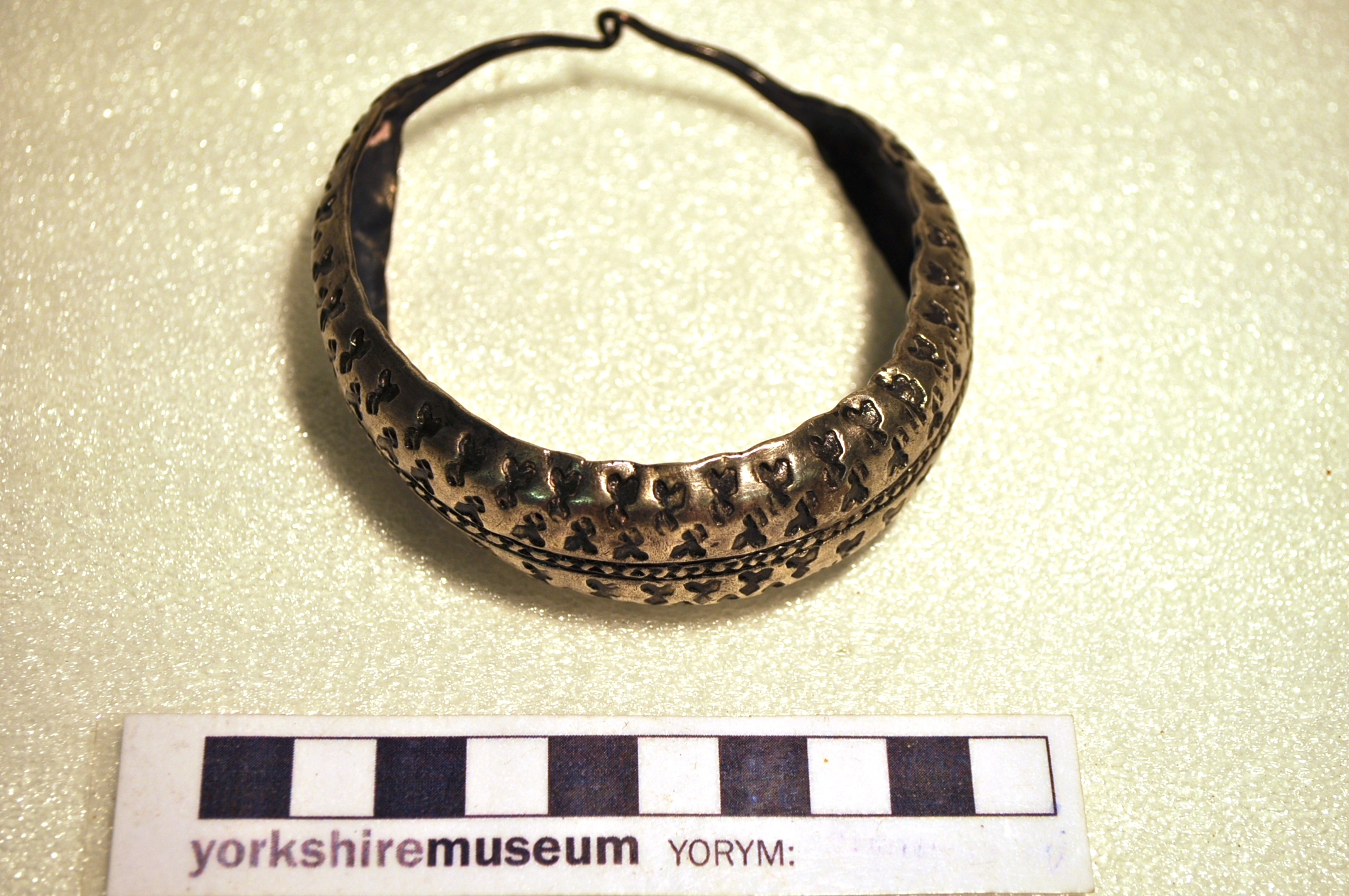
- The armlet from the hoard.
- Created: 900–950 (deposited)
- Period/culture: Viking
- Discovered: 1807; Between Bossall and Flaxton, North Yorkshire, England
- Present location: Yorkshire Museum, York

The Bossall-Flaxton hoard is a Viking period hoard comprising silver jewellery, hacksilver and c.270 coins dating to the early 10th century AD. It was found on land between Bossall and Flaxton in North Yorkshire, England.

== Discovery ==
The hoard was first reported in the 1807 edition of The Gentleman's Magazine. The writer, using the pseudonym 'Amicus', reports the discovery of the hoard in an arable field on 14 September 1807 of a lead box containing coins and associated it with some silver jewellery found in ploughsoil nearby.

== Contents ==
At least 270 silver pennies were discovered in the hoard. The coins were subsequently dispersed and so a full catalogue has never been created. The 1807 account reported that "it appears evident from the pieces of Silver found with the Coins, that the whole was the plunder of a field of battle. Some of these appear separated or chopped off from others of them, and to be pieces of stirrups." These are interpreted as hacksilver associated with the hoard.

A silver armlet decorated with punched decoration was acquired by the Yorkshire Museum in 1824. Three coins are also in the Yorkshire Museum collection. At least one coin from the reign of Regnald (c.AD 919–921) is in the collection of the British Museum.
