= Buttercrambe Mill =

Mill in Buttercrambe, North Yorkshire, England

Coordinates: 54°01′00″N 0°52′49″W

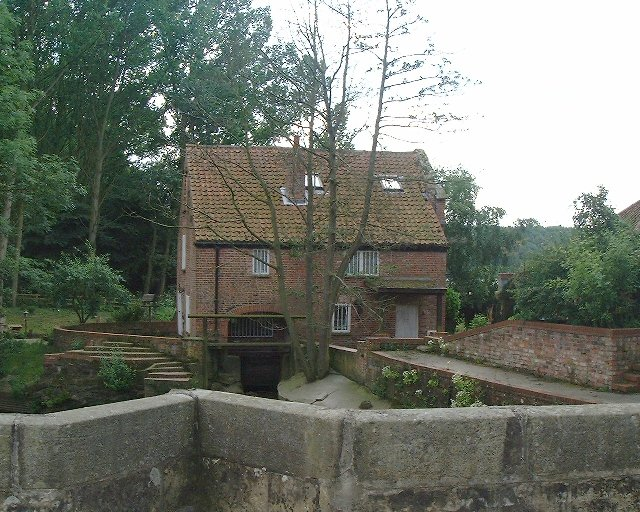
The mill, in 2002

Buttercrambe Mill is a historic building in Buttercrambe, a village in North Yorkshire, in England.

The former watermill has a datestone reading "1697". It has a mill race on the River Derwent and milled corn. It was Grade II listed in 1953, and was converted into a house in the 1980s. In 2016, it was put up for auction, with a guide price of £300,000.

The mill is built of brick, with a stepped floor band, stepped eaves courses, and a pantile roof. There are two storeys and attics, and three bays. The middle bay projects under a pedimented gable, and it contains a doorway and rusticated brick quoins. The windows are casements, and all the openings have rusticated brick surrounds and keystones. In the attic is an oculus with keystones. Inside, many of the original floor beams survive, and there is a 20th-century iron spiral staircase.

== See also ==
- Listed buildings in Buttercrambe with Bossall
