= St John the Evangelist's Church, Buttercrambe =

Anglican church in North Yorkshire, England

Coordinates: 54°00′50″N 0°52′54″W

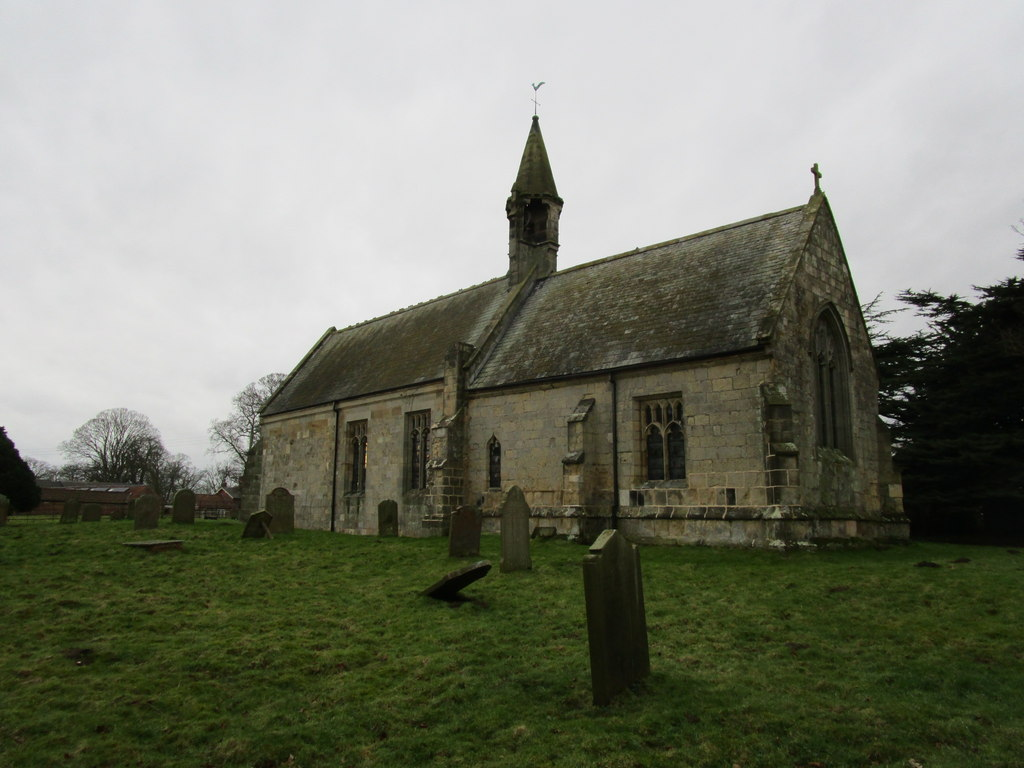
The building, in 2015

St John the Evangelist's Church is an Anglican church in Buttercrambe, a village in North Yorkshire in England.

The church lies in a grassy churchyard, south of the village's Main Street. It was originally constructed around 1240, with a four-bay nave, south aisle and chancel. Since at least 1404, the church has been a chapel of ease to St Botolph's Church, Bossall. In the 15th century, the nave was shortened, the aisle removed, and the chancel rebuilt. The church was altered in 1803, and then heavily restored between 1878 and 1881. The architect is unclear, but may have been C. Hodgson Fowler or Temple Moore. The building was Grade II* listed in 1953.

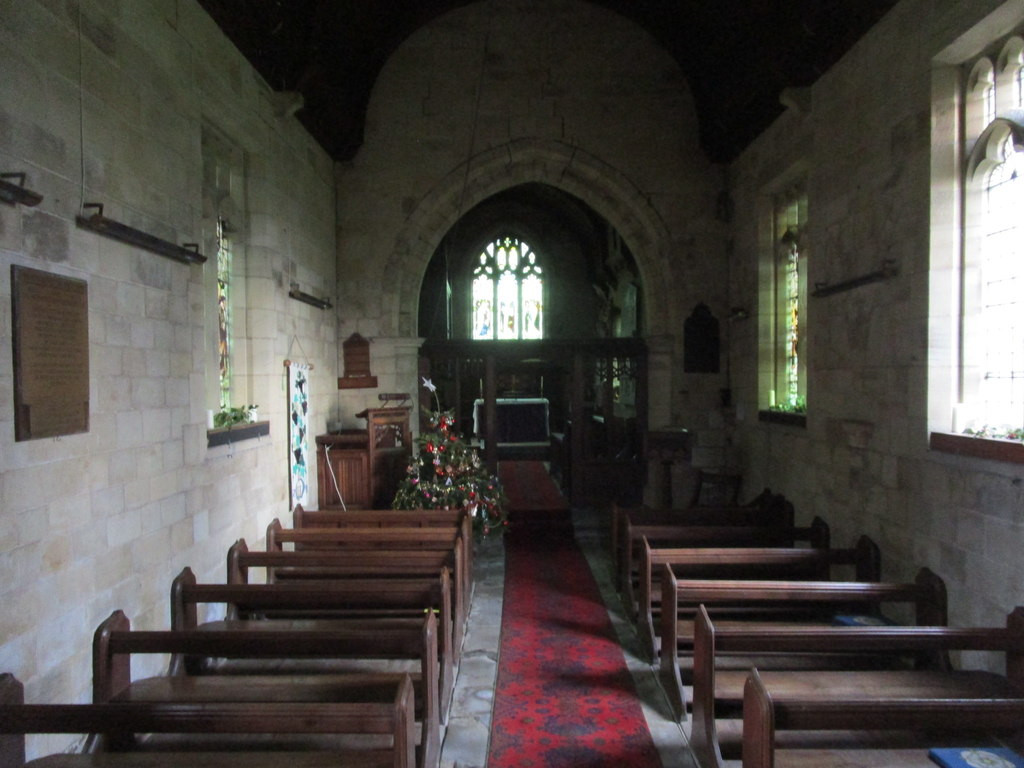
View from the nave into the chancel

The church is built in limestone and sandstone and has a Westmorland slate roof. It consists of a nave measuring 40 feet by 16 feet, and a chancel at a slight angle. The chancel has a 13th-century door in its north wall. On the junction of the nave and the chancel is a bell turret with a spire. Most of the windows are in Perpendicular style, almost all dating from the Victorian restoration. Inside, there are several wall monuments, the earliest dating from 1674.

== See also ==
- Grade II* listed churches in North Yorkshire (district)
- Listed buildings in Buttercrambe with Bossall
