= St Leonard's Church, Sand Hutton =

Church in Sand Hutton, North Yorkshire, England

Coordinates: 54°01′08″N 0°56′27″W

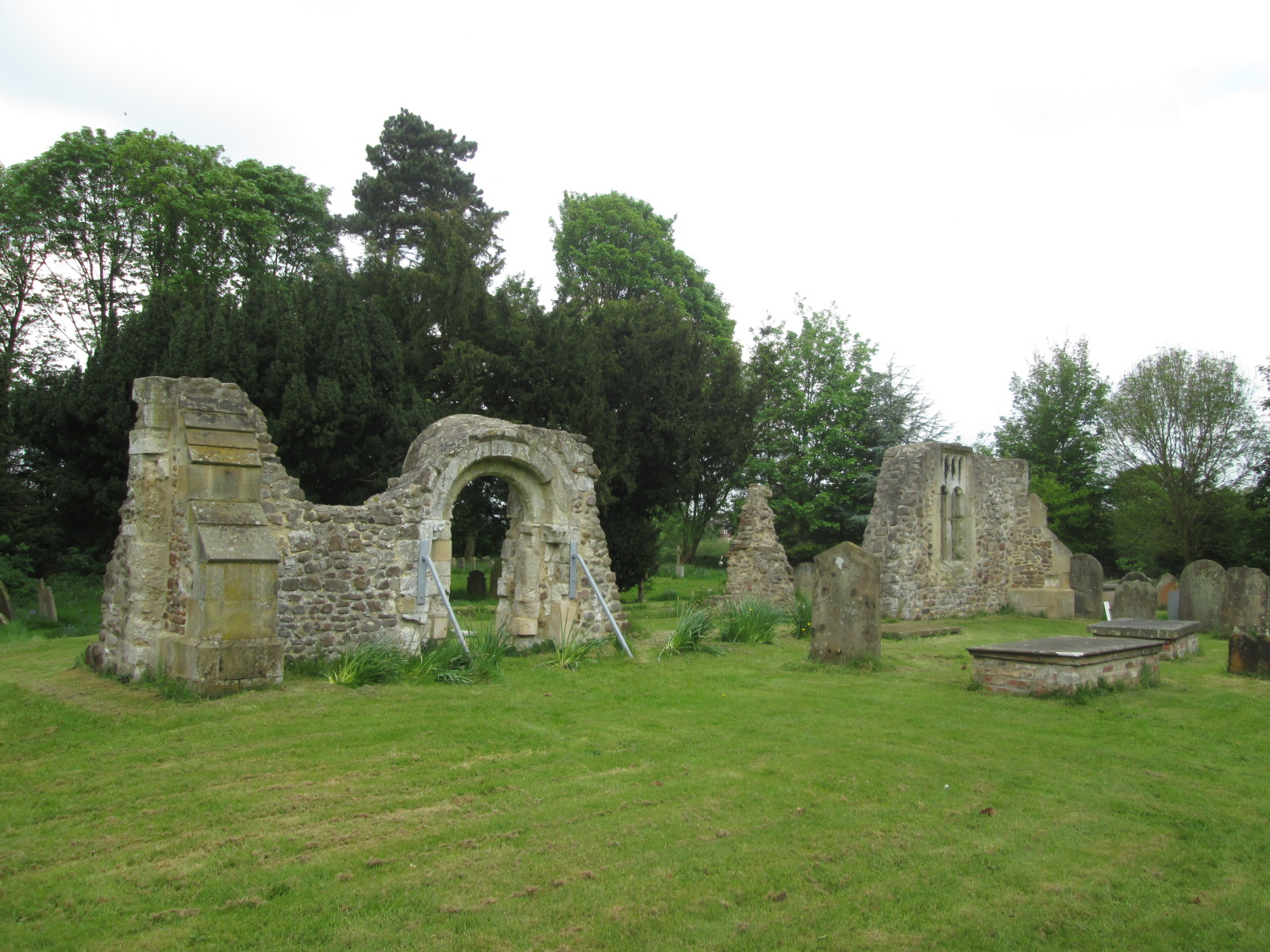
The building, in 2018

St Leonard's Church is a ruined chapel in Sand Hutton, a village in North Yorkshire, in England.

The church was built in the 12th century, as a chapel of ease to St Botolph's Church, Bossall. The chancel was added in the 15th century, but Sand Hutton remained a small settlement, so the church was largely unaltered until it was repaired in the early 19th century. From 1840 to 1842, St Mary's Church, Sand Hutton was constructed in the churchyard, and St Leonard's gradually fell into ruin. The remains of the chapel were grade II listed in 1953. Despite this, the building is in poor condition, with the masonry around the door supported by metal poles.

The chapel is built of stone and pebbles, with dressings in sandstone and limestone. The remains consist of the round-arched Norman south door with wo orders, volute capitals, an incised sundial to the left, and a section of wall to the right containing one two-light square-headed window with Perpendicular tracery. There are vestiges of the east wall, and inside is a cylindrical font.

== See also ==
- Listed buildings in Sand Hutton
