= Buttercrambe with Bossall =

Civil parish in North Yorkshire, England

Coordinates: 54.015°N 0.881°W

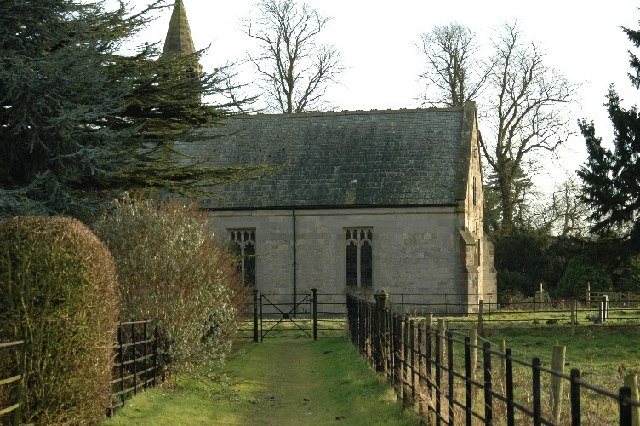
- Chapel of St John, Buttercrambe

- Location within North Yorkshire
- Population: 105 (2011 census)
- OS grid reference: SE 733 582
- Civil parish: Buttercrambe with Bossall
- Unitary authority: North Yorkshire
- Ceremonial county: North Yorkshire
- Region: Yorkshire and the Humber
- Country: England
- Sovereign state: United Kingdom
- Police: North Yorkshire
- Fire: North Yorkshire
- Ambulance: Yorkshire

Buttercrambe with Bossall is a civil parish in North Yorkshire, England. The parish had a population of 100 according to the 2001 census, increasing to 105 at the 2011 census. The parish is near Stamford Bridge, and contains Buttercrambe and Bossall. From 1974 to 2023 it was part of the district of Ryedale, it is now administered by the unitary North Yorkshire Council.

== See also ==
- Listed buildings in Buttercrambe with Bossall
