= Buttercrambe Castle =

Castle in North Yorkshire, England

Coordinates: 54.016540°N 0.881980°W

Buttercrambe Castle was in the village of Buttercrambe in North Yorkshire, England.

This was possibly a medieval motte-and-bailey castle. The bailey has been extensively landscaped making accurate interpretation difficult. Some earthworks only remain.

In 1200, William de Stuteville entertained King John of England at his manor of Cottingham, receiving permission for markets and to embattle his manors at Cottingham and Buttercrambe.
