= Listed buildings in Buttercrambe with Bossall =

Buttercrambe with Bossall is a civil parish in the county of North Yorkshire, England. It contains 13 listed buildings that are recorded in the National Heritage List for England. Of these, one is listed at Grade I, the highest of the three grades, two are at Grade II*, the middle grade, and the others are at Grade II, the lowest grade. The parish contains the village of Buttercrambe, the hamlet of Bossall, and the surrounding countryside. The listed buildings include a country house and associated structures, smaller houses, two churches, a former watermill, a bridge, a farmhouse, and a group of barns.

== Key ==
Grade	Criteria
I	Buildings of exceptional interest, sometimes considered to be internationally important
II*	Particularly important buildings of more than special interest
II	Buildings of national importance and special interest

== Buildings ==
Name and location	Photograph	Date	Notes	Grade
St Botolph's Church; 54.03775°N 0.90458°W		Late 12th century	The church has been altered and extended through the centuries, including a restoration in 1859. It is built in limestone and sandstone and has a Welsh slate roof. The church has a cruciform plan, consisting of a nave with a south porch, north and south transepts, a chancel, and a tower at the crossing. The tower, nave and transepts have a string course and a corbel table. The south porch has a moulded round-headed arch with four orders of shafts with dogtooth and stylised flower decoration, and waterleaf capitals. The doorway in the north porch is similar, but with only one order.	I
St John the Evangelist's Church; 54.01380°N 0.88157°W		c. 1240	Alterations were made to the church in the 15th century, and there was a major restoration in 1878. It is built in limestone and sandstone and has a Westmorland slate roof, and consists of a nave, and a chancel at a slight angle. On the junction of the nave and the chancel is a bell turret with a spire. Most of the windows are in Perpendicular style.	II*
Bossall Hall; 54.03744°N 0.90640°W	—	Early 17th century	The house, on a moated site, is in brick with an M-shaped tile roof. There are two storeys and attics, a double-depth plan, eight bays, and rear service wings. The doorway has a divided fanlight, the windows are sashes with flat brick arches, and in the attics are five dormers with casements. There are two projecting chimney stacks flanked by small casement windows with decorative brick pediments.	II
Buttercrambe Mill; 54.01667°N 0.88039°W		Late 17th or early 18th century	A watermill, later a private house, in brick, with a stepped floor band, stepped eaves courses, and a pantile roof. There are two storeys and attics, and three bays. The middle bay projects under a pedimented gable, and it contains a doorway and rusticated brick quoins. The windows are casements, and all the openings have rusticated brick surrounds and keystones. In the attic is an oculus with keystones.	II
Aldby Park; 54.01645°N 0.88357°W		1726	A country house in an estate of the same name, it is in brick and stone, with stone dressings and a Welsh slate roof. The garden front has three storeys and a basement, and nine bays. The middle three bays are in stone and project, with quoins and bands in the lower floors. These bays are flanked by rusticated pilasters, and in the ground floor there are Ionic pilasters and an entablature. The middle floor has Composite fluted pilasters, a frieze with a carved panel, and a dentilled pediment with a carved tympanum including coats of arms and a bust. The top floor contains simple pilasters. Steps lead to a central doorway with a fanlight, and the windows are sashes. The basement windows have rusticated surrounds and triple keystones, and in the outer bays they have eared architraves on consoles, those in the ground floor on balustrades, and those in the middle floor with carved panels.	II*
Aldby Park Lodge; 54.01496°N 0.88141°W		Early 18th century	The lodge at the entrance to the grounds is in brick with stone dressings, quoins, an eaves band, and a Westmorland slate roof. There are two storeys and the entrance front has a single bay. This contains a doorway with attached Ionic columns, a moulded entablature and a dentilled pediment. It is flanked by narrow sash windows with keystones, and above it is a round-arched window with a moulded archivolt and quoins linking with the pediment. On the sides are projecting gabled bays with recesses containing round-arched sash windows with pilasters, moulded archivolts and moulded sills on brackets.	II
Stable block, Aldby Park; 54.01570°N 0.88367°W	—	Early 18th century	The stable block is in brick, with stone dressings, quoins and a pantile roof. There is a U-shaped plan, with a two-storey gabled range on a plinth, flanked by single-storey wings with hipped roofs. In the centre is a carriage entrance with a quoined surround, above which is a pitching hole converted into a casement window. The gable is pedimented, it contains an oculus and is surmounted by a weathervane. In the wings are stable doors with quoined surrounds, and sash windows with flat brick arches.	II
Garden sculpture (north), Aldby Park; 54.01630°N 0.88325°W	—	Early 18th century	The sculpture is in limestone and about 2 metres (6 ft 7 in) high. It depicts two children, one in Roman-style dress, sitting on a goose. This is on a squared pear-shaped pedestal decorated with scrolls and stylised foliage, surmounted by a plain capital, on a square plinth.	II
Garden sculpture (south), Aldby Park; 54.01623°N 0.88341°W	—	Early 18th century	The sculpture is in limestone and about 2 metres (6 ft 7 in) high, and depicts two putti playing. This is on a squared pear-shaped pedestal decorated with scrolls and stylised foliage, surmounted by a plain capital, on a square plinth.	II
Buttercrambe Bridge; 54.01692°N 0.88075°W	—	18th century	The bridge, which carries a road over a mill stream, is in sandstone and consists of two segmental arches. The bridge has a cutwater rising to a pedestrian refuge, a band and a parapet.	II
Buttercrambe House; 54.01477°N 0.88106°W		Late 18th century	The house is in brick, and has a pantile roof with tumbled-in and raised gable ends. There are two storeys and three bays. The central doorway has a fanlight with Gothic glazing, and the windows are sashes with rubbed brick arches.	II
Mount Pleasant Farmhouse; 54.03488°N 0.92181°W	—	Late 18th to early 19th century	The farmhouse is in brick, with a stepped eaves course, and a pantile roof with tumbled-in and raised gable ends. There are two storeys and four bays, and a rear outshut with a catslide roof. The doorway has a plain surround, a divided fanlight and a dentilled cornice. The windows are sashes with flat brick arches.	II
Barnby House Barns; 54.03990°N 0.89437°W		Late 19th century	A group of three open barns in brick with roofs of Westmorland slate and asbestos. The front of each barn facing the road has a pedimented gable, and a tall round-arched cart entrance. The roof is carried on brick piers.	II
