= Listed buildings in Claxton, North Yorkshire =

Claxton is a civil parish in the county of North Yorkshire, England. It contains three listed buildings that are recorded in the National Heritage List for England. All the listed buildings are designated at Grade II, the lowest of the three grades, which is applied to "buildings of national importance and special interest". The parish contains the village of Claxton and the surrounding countryside, and all the listed buildings are houses.

== Buildings ==
Name and location	Photograph	Date	Notes
Lobster House and Cottage; 54.03549°N 0.95707°W	—	17th century	A house, divided into two, in brick, with a floor band, dentilled eaves, and an M-shaped pantile roof with tumbled-in gable ends, stone coping and kneelers. There are two storeys, a double depth plan, six bays and a stair turret incorporated into the rear range. The doorway has an infilled fanlight, and the windows are sashes, those in the ground floor under segmental arches.
Vicarage Farmhouse; 54.03201°N 0.94077°W	—	Late 18th century	A house with a later extension to the right and a service wing, it is in brick, with dentilled eaves and a pantile roof. There are two storeys and four bays. The doorway has a radial fanlight, and is flanked by two-storey canted bay windows. In the right bay is a full height bow window, and the other windows in the upper floor are tripartite sashes.
Middle Cottage; 54.03201°N 0.94077°W	—	Early 19th century	The house is in brick, with a stepped eaves course, and a pantile roof with tumbled-in and raised gable ends. There are two storeys and three bays. The central doorway has a moulded surround and a fanlight, and the windows are sashes in moulded surrounds.
