= Flaxton, North Yorkshire =

Village and civil parish in North Yorkshire, England

Coordinates: 54°03′08″N 0°57′47″W

Flaxton
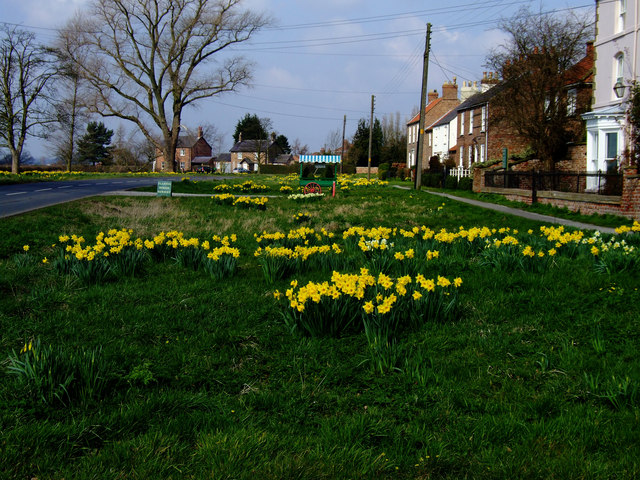
- Rice Lane, Flaxton

- Location within North Yorkshire
- Population: 343 (2011 census)
- OS grid reference: SE678623
- Civil parish: Flaxton
- Unitary authority: North Yorkshire
- Ceremonial county: North Yorkshire
- Region: Yorkshire and the Humber
- Country: England
- Sovereign state: United Kingdom
- Post town: YORK
- Postcode district: YO60
- Police: North Yorkshire
- Fire: North Yorkshire
- Ambulance: Yorkshire
- UK Parliament: Thirsk and Malton

Flaxton is a small village and civil parish in North Yorkshire, England. It is close to the A64 between York and Malton. The village lies entirely within a Conservation Area as defined by Planning (Listed Building and Conservation Areas Act) 1990.

== History ==
The village is mentioned in the Domesday Book as Flaxtune in the Bulford hundred. At that time it was part of the manor of Foston and was in the possession of Earl Morcar, but passed to Count Alan of Brittany by 1086. The etymology of the name is taken from Old English meaning settlement where flax is made.

In 1807 a lead box containing around 300 Saxon silver coins was discovered in a field near the village.

Flaxton was served by Flaxton railway station on the York to Scarborough Line between 1845 and 1930.

== Governance ==
The village lies within the Thirsk and Malton (UK Parliament constituency). It is also within the Sheriff Hutton & Derwent electoral division of North Yorkshire Council.

From 1974 to 2023 the village was part of the Ryedale district.

== Geography ==
The nearest settlements to the village are Claxton 1.5 miles (2.4 km) to the south; West Lilling 2.2 miles (3.5 km) to the north-west; Harton 1.5 miles (2.4 km) to the east and Thornton-le-Clay 1.6 miles (2.6 km) to the north-east.

The 1881 UK Census recorded the population as 366. According to the 2001 UK Census, the village had a population of 331, of which 255 were over the age of sixteen. Of these, 168 were in employment. There were 138 dwellings, of which 86 were detached. The 2011 Census showed a population of 343.

The village areas around Flaxton Village Green and the Crofts are designated Sites of Importance for Nature Conservation (SINCs). Here can be found semi-improved and unimproved neutral grassland, as well as wet grassland on the Keld with three ponds that include two great crested newt breeding sites.

It has one pub, the Thompson Arms Inn, and a B&B, the Blacksmiths Arms.

== Education ==
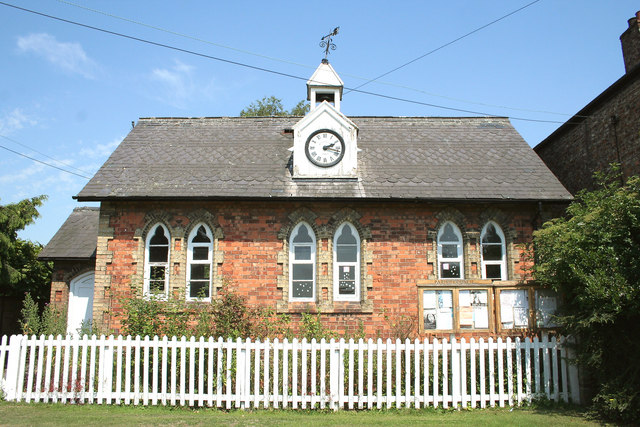
The Old School

In 1867 a Church of England school was built in the village. It was built by Thomas Abbey of Claxton on land donated by Thomas Richard Smith and paid for with money raised by the Rector and parishioners. The clock is by Potts of Leeds and dates to the end of the 19th-century.

The school closed in 1987 and was listed as a Grade II building in 2011 as an unusual surviving example of school for poorer children which pre-dates the Elementary Education Act 1870.

The village is now within the education catchment areas of Sand Hutton primary school and Huntington School, York.

== Religion ==
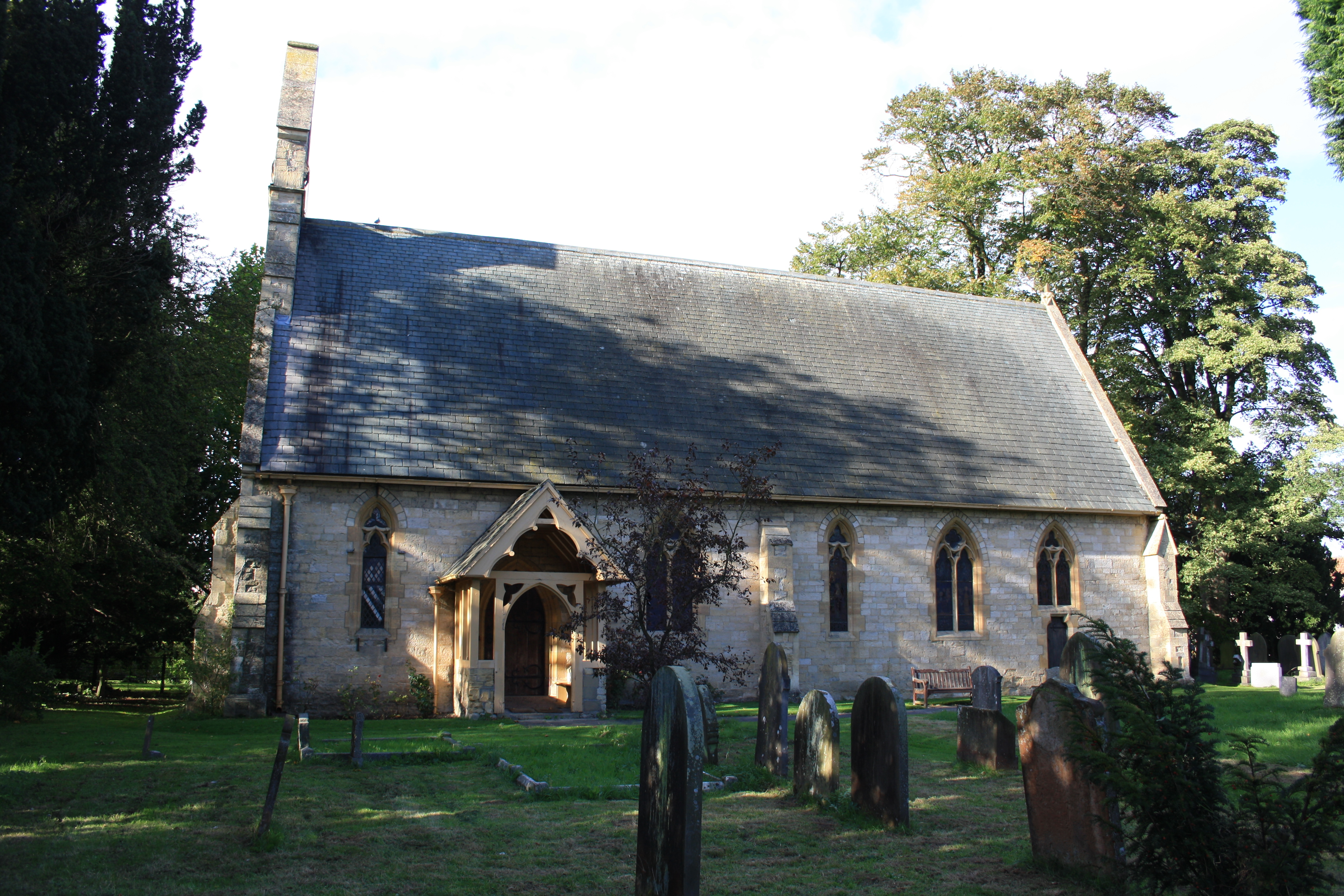
St Lawrence's Church

St Lawrence's Church, Flaxton was built in 1853 in the 13th-century Gothic style and replaced an earlier chapel. The church was declared a rectory in 1867 before which time it had been a perpetual curacy.

The lychgate was erected as a memorial after the First World War.

== See also ==
- Listed buildings in Flaxton, North Yorkshire
