= Listed buildings in Sand Hutton =

Sand Hutton is a civil parish in the county of North Yorkshire, England. It contains eight listed buildings that are recorded in the National Heritage List for England. All the listed buildings are designated at Grade II, the lowest of the three grades, which is applied to "buildings of national importance and special interest". The parish contains the village of Sand Hutton and the surrounding countryside. The listed buildings consist of two churches, one in ruins, three houses, a dovecote, a bridge and a war memorial.

== Buildings ==
Name and location	Photograph	Date	Notes
St Leonard's Church; 54.01880°N 0.94077°W		Early 12th century	The church, now in ruins, is built in stone and pebbles, with dressings in sandstone and limestone. The remains consist of the round-arched Norman south door with wo orders, volute capitals, an incised sundial to the left, and a section of wall to the right containing one two-light square-headed window with Perpendicular tracery. There are vestiges of the east wall, and inside is a cylindrical font.
Low Moor Farmhouse; 54.01565°N 0.91949°W	—	Late 17th century	The house is in brick, with an eaves band, and a swept roof of pantile and tile. There are two storeys and attics, a front of four bays, and a rear stair turret with flanking outshuts. On the front is a gabled porch, to the left is a bow window, and the other window are horizontally sliding sashes. On the roof are three gabled dormers.
Sinkinson House Farmhouse; 54.01933°N 0.91345°W	—	Late 17th to early 18th century	The house is in rendered brick, with a floor band, a projecting eaves course, and a pantile roof with raised gable ends and kneelers. There are two storeys, three bays, and a rear wing. On the front is a doorway and sash windows, and inside is an inglenook fireplace.
Dovecote; 54.01599°N 0.94110°W	—	18th century	The dovecote in the garden of No. 7 Upper Helmsley Road is in red brick, with a floor band, cogged eaves, and a tile roof. There is an octagonal plan and two storeys. On the roof is a glazed cupola with a domed lead roof.
Stank Bridge; 54.01695°N 0.94405°W	—	Early 19th century	The bridge, which carries a road over a stream, is in limestone , and consists of a single segmental arch. It has a band, a parapet, and coping drums at the ends of the parapet.
Wood House; 54.02723°N 0.90592°W	—	Early 19th century	The house is in brick, with a dentilled eaves course, and an M-shaped swept pantile roof with tumbling to the rear gable. There are two storeys, two ranges, three bays, and additions to the rear and sides. On the front is a porch, a doorway with a fanlight, and sash windows.
St Mary's Church; 54.01856°N 0.94101°W		1840–42	The church was designed by Anthony Salvin and remodelled in 1885–86 by C. Hodgson Fowler. It is built in sandstone, incorporating medieval fabric in the tower, and has a Westmorland slate roof. The church consists of a nave, a south steeple, a chancel and a north organ chamber. The steeple has a tower with three stages, containing a porch with a pointed doorway, a lancet window above, paired bell openings and a broach spire.
Sand Hutton and Claxton War Memorial; 54.02289°N 0.93475°W		1924	The war memorial, in an enclosure by a road junction, is in stone. It consists of a tall tapering cross on a plinth, on a high octagonal pedestal, on three octagonal steps. The cross has an inset wheel with a carved pattern. On the pedestal are panels, the one on the front with an inscription, others with the names of those lost in the two World Wars, and side panels with carved motifs.
