= Listed buildings in Flaxton, North Yorkshire =

Flaxton is a civil parish in the county of North Yorkshire, England. It contains seven listed buildings that are recorded in the National Heritage List for England. All the listed buildings are designated at Grade II, the lowest of the three grades, which is applied to "buildings of national importance and special interest". The parish contains the village of Flaxton and the surrounding countryside, and the listed buildings consist of houses, farmhouses, and a former school.

== Buildings ==
Name and location	Photograph	Date	Notes
Elm Tree Farmhouse; 54.05277°N 0.96377°W		Early 18th century	Two houses, later combined, in brick, with a dentilled eaves course, and a swept pantile roof with tumbled-in gable ends. There are two storeys and three bays. On the front is a doorway, and windows, most of which are sashes, with one casement.
Gennell Farmhouse; 54.05829°N 0.98075°W	—	Early 18th century	The farmhouse is in rendered brick, with a dentilled eaves course, and a swept pantile roof with tumbled-in and raised gable ends. There are two storeys and three bays. The central doorway has a divided fanlight, and the windows are sashes.
Village Farmhouse; 54.05329°N 0.96458°W		Early 18th century	The house is in brick, with a floor band, and a French tile roof with tumbled-in and coped gables and shaped kneelers. There are two storeys and three bays. On the front is a doorway, and the windows are horizontally-sliding sashes with brick arches.
Flaxton House; 54.05376°N 0.96518°W		Late 18th century	A house in brick, rendered on the front, with stone quoins, sill bands, and a Westmorland slate roof with gable copings and shaped kneelers. There are three storeys, three bays, and a rear service wing and outshut. The central doorway has engaged Tuscan columns, an entablature and a radial fanlight. This is flanked by canted bay windows with dentilled cornices, and the other windows are sashes with arched heads.
Flaxton Old School; 54.05216°N 0.96278°W		1867	The former school is in mottled red brick, with dressings in pale yellow brick, quoins, and a blue slate roof. There is a single storey, three bays, and porches on the left and at the rear. The windows are lancets with cusped upper lights, those on the front paired. The doorway in the left porch has a segmental arch and an architrave. On the roof is a timber dormer with a clock face, a cupola and a weathervane. On the northwest side wall is an inscribed stone plaque.
Greenside; 54.05288°N 0.96395°W	—	Early 19th century	The house is in brick, with a dentilled eaves course, and a pantile roof with tumbled-in and coped gables and shaped kneelers. There are two storeys and three bays. The central doorway has a moulded surround, a fanlight and a wide cornice on brackets. The windows are sashes in flush frames with stone sills and flat brick arches.
Westfield; 54.05317°N 0.96437°W		Early to mid 19th century	The house is in brick, and has a Westmorland slate roof with gable coping and shaped kneelers. There are two storeys and three bays. The central doorway has engaged fluted Doric columns, a fanlight, friezes with rosettes, and a plain cornice. The windows are sashes with flat stone arches and keystones.
