= Listed buildings in Harton, North Yorkshire =

Harton is a civil parish in the county of North Yorkshire, England. It contains five listed buildings that are recorded in the National Heritage List for England. All the listed buildings are designated at Grade II, the lowest of the three grades, which is applied to "buildings of national importance and special interest". The parish contains the village of Harton and the surrounding countryside, and the listed buildings consist of two farmhouses and a farm building, a set of gateposts and entrance lodges, and two mileposts.

== Buildings ==
Name and location	Photograph	Date	Notes
Pear Tree Farmhouse; 54.04927°N 0.92453°W		Early to mid 18th century	The house is in sandstone, faced in brick, with a stepped and dentilled eaves course, and a swept pantile roof with raised and tumbled-in gable ends. There are two storeys and three bays. In the centre is a doorway in a relieving arch, and the windows are casements with concrete lintels.
Gateposts and lodges, Howsham Hall; 54.04296°N 0.94098°W		Mid 18th century	The lodges and gateposts at the entrance to the drive are in sandstone. The lodges each have one storey and one bay, a moulded cornice and a parapet; the roof is missing. On each side is an arch with a keystone and an impost band, one arch containing a window, another a doorway, and the others blind. Two of the four gateposts survive, and have a rectangular plan, an oval medallion at the front and rear, and moulded capitals. The former griffins are missing.
Willow Bridge Farmhouse and barn 54.04867°N 0.89836°W	—	Mid to late 18th century	The farmhouse and barn to the left are in brick and have swept pantile roofs. The house has two storeys and three bays, two parallel ranges and an M-shaped roof, a cogged eaves course, and raised gable ends. In the centre is a porch, above which is a blocked window, and the other windows are horizontally-sliding sashes. The barn has a cart entrance in the gable end, and gable coping.
Milepost near Field House; 54.04905°N 0.94047°W		Late 19th century	The milepost is on the west side of the A64 road. It is in cast iron, and has a triangular plan and a sloping top. On both sides are pointing hands, on the left face is the distance to Malton, and on the right side the distance to York.
Milepost near Lobster House; 54.03901°N 0.95358°W		Late 19th century	The milepost is on the northwest side of the A64 road. It is in cast iron, and has a triangular plan and a sloping top. On both sides are pointing hands, on the left face is the distance to Malton, and on the right side the distance to York.
