= Bossall Hall =

House in Bossall, North Yorkshire, England

Coordinates: 54°02′15″N 0°54′23″W

Bossall Hall is a historic building in Bossall, a village in North Yorkshire in England.

A quadrangular castle was constructed in Bossall by Paulinus de Bossall in the 14th century, surrounded by a moat. It was demolished in the early 17th century by Robert Belt, who constructed a new hall within the moat, probably reusing building materials from the castle. It was partly rebuilt in the 18th century, and its external appearance now dates to this period; Historic England describes it as "not outstanding". The building was Grade II listed in 1953, and the site, including the largely-intact moat, was made a scheduled monument in 1993. It was put up for sale in 2020, with a guide price of more than £2 million.

The house is built of brick, with an M-shaped tile roof. There are two storeys and attics, a double-depth plan, eight bays, and rear service wings. The doorway has a divided fanlight, the windows are sashes with flat brick arches, and in the attics are five dormers with casements. There are two projecting chimney stacks flanked by small 17th-century casement windows with decorative brick pediments. There are drainpipe heads dated 1726 and 1798. Inside, there is an 18th-century wooden staircase, and wooden panelling in the central room, of similar date.

== See also ==
- Listed buildings in Buttercrambe with Bossall
