= Aldby Park =

Country house in Buttercrambe, Yorkshire, England

Coordinates: 54.01735°N 0.88738°W

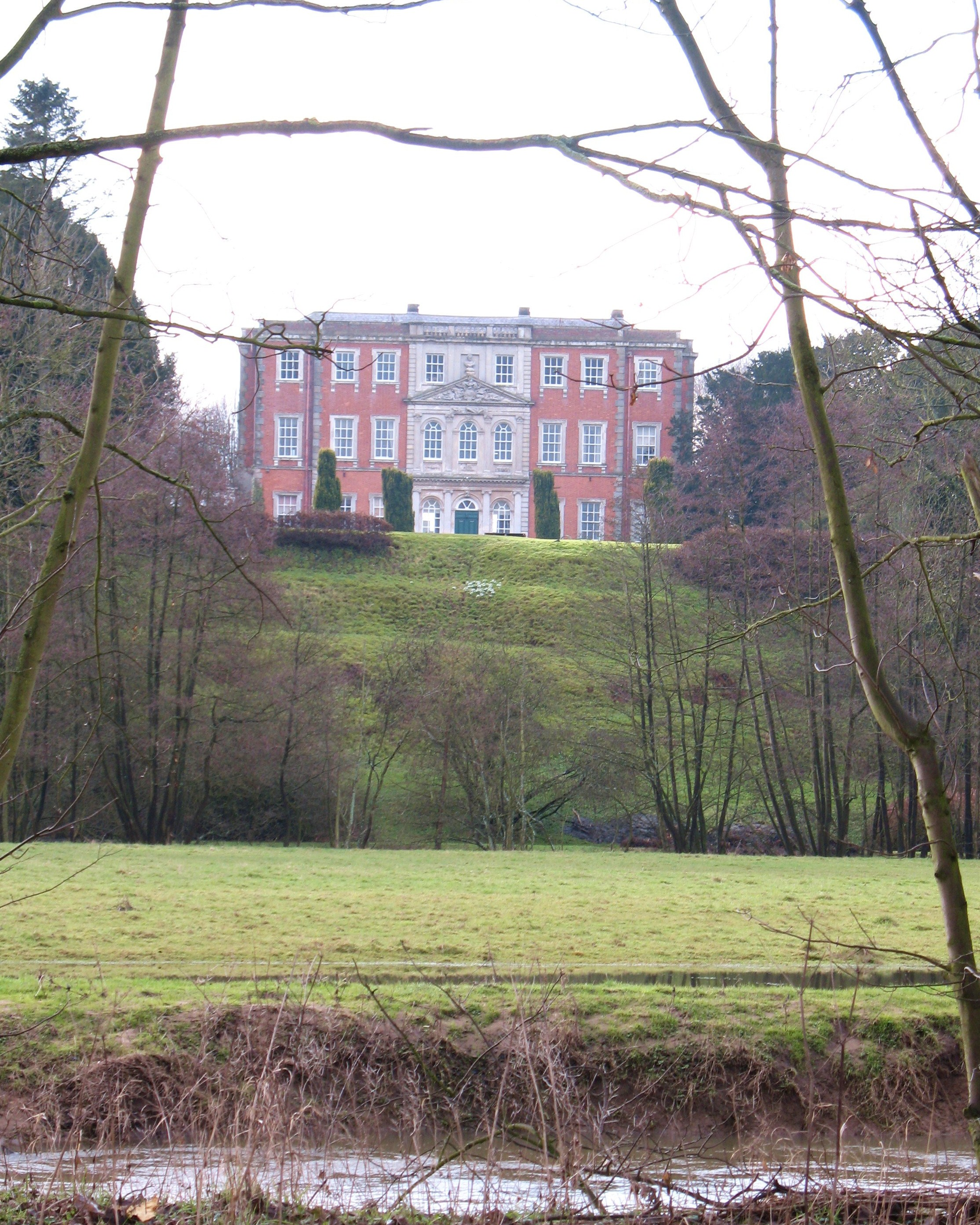
Aldby Park, Buttercrambe

Aldby Park is a country estate in the village of Buttercrambe, near the village of Stamford Bridge in the East Riding of Yorkshire, England.

The house, replacing the original Tudor one, was built around 1725 by Jane Darley but it occupies an ancient site believed to be where Edwin of Northumbria was crowned King in 625 AD.

Aldby Park is best known as being the ancestral home of the Darley family. This family's best known member is Thomas Darley, brother of Jane Darley, who owned the celebrated Darley Arabian horse which is widely recognised as being the earliest ancestor of most of the world's thoroughbred race horses. Most recently, it has been the home of Mark Winn, grandson of Rowland Winn, 1st Baron St Oswald, and his son, George Winn-Darley.

The three-storey house is built of brick with ashlar dressing and a slate roof, with a nine-bay frontage.

== History ==
William Darley had bought Buttercrambe manor in 1557. Sir Richard Darley's son and heir, Henry Darley, was elected MP for Malton in 1645. It was Henry Darley's son Richard who asked his own son Thomas to send the Darley Arabian from Aleppo, where Thomas was a merchant. Richard died in 1706 and was succeeded by another son Henry, on whose death in 1720 the estate passed to his sister Jane, all her other brothers having also died. Jane had married John Brewster, who changed his name to Brewster-Darley and built the present house around 1725. Their grandson Henry Darley died in 1810. Henry's son Henry (1777–1846) was a justice of the peace and High Sheriff of Yorkshire in 1827. His son, Henry Brewster (1809–1860) and the latter's son, yet another Henry (1839–1904) also served as Tory justices. Cecil Geoffrey Darley of Aldby Hall was born in 1885.

The house was requisitioned by the army during the Second World War and suffered severely, but was renovated after the war by Mark Winn. He passed it on to his son George whilst continuing to live there. In 1999 the house suffered a serious fire.

== See also ==
- Grade II* listed buildings in North Yorkshire
- Listed buildings in Buttercrambe with Bossall
