= Thomas Darley =

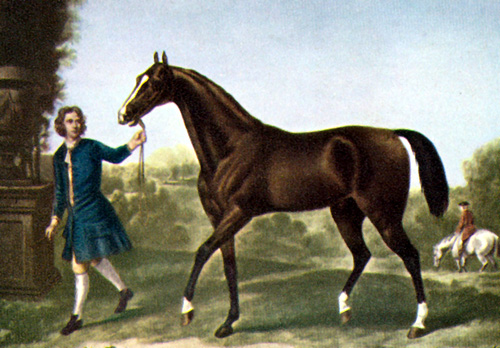
The Darley Arabian stallion painting by John Wootton

Thomas Darley (born 19 May 1664) served as Her Majesty's Consul to the Levant (Syria) during the reign of Queen Anne. His position in the Levant gave him access to the region's horse trade and enabled his purchase of the colt that later became known as the Darley Arabian.

He is famous for having bought an Arabian colt that became an important part of the history of the Thoroughbred breed.

Darley was born in Aldby Park, Yorkshire, England. His father was Richard Darley, and his mother Dorothea was a daughter of the regicide Thomas Waite (Wayte).

In 1702, Darley, while in Syria, bought an Arabian colt from Sheikh Mirza for his father, Richard Darley. There are conflicting stories about how much Darley exchanged or paid for the colt; one proposed history is that a price of 300 gold sovereigns was set but after the sheikh withdrew from the deal, Darley arranged for British sailors to steal and smuggle the horse via Smyrna. Nevertheless, he had made arrangements to send him back to Yorkshire. The colt was foaled in Syria, late March or early April in the year 1700. The horse, a bay, was tall for an Arabian horse of the time was 15 hands when described by Darley in a letter to his brother dated 21 December 1703. The horse whose original name was "Ras el Fedowi," translated as "The Headstrong One", became immortalised as the "Darley Arabian".

In Thomas Darley's own words, "he was immediately striking owing to his handsome appearance and exceedingly elegant carriage". Although he never raced, he covered mares at Aldby Park from 1705 until 1719 and lived until the advanced age of 30. His genes added speed to those of stronger English horses of the time. Through his offspring, including his great-grandson, the famous and never beaten Eclipse, he has had the greater influence of the three foundation stallions of the thoroughbred breed. His bloodline is said to be present in about 95% of today's thoroughbred racehorses.

== Ancestry ==
Ancestors of Thomas Darley

8. Richard Darley (abt 1559?)
4. Henry Darley (abt 1596)
9. Elizabeth Gates (1576)
2. Richard Darley (abt 1631)
10. William Watts
5. Elizabeth Watts (abt 1598)
1. Thomas Darley
12. Richard Waite (1582)
6. Thomas Waite (abt 1609)
13. Margaret Carter (abt 1582)
3. Dorothy Waite (abt 1634)
14. William Watts (Abt 1599)
7. Eleanor Paine (abt 1618)
