= Bossall =

Village in North Yorkshire, England

Coordinates: 54°02′17″N 0°54′16″W

- Location within North Yorkshire
- OS grid reference: SE718607
- Civil parish: Buttercrambe with Bossall
- Unitary authority: North Yorkshire
- Ceremonial county: North Yorkshire
- Region: Yorkshire and the Humber
- Country: England
- Sovereign state: United Kingdom
- Post town: YORK
- Postcode district: YO60
- Police: North Yorkshire
- Fire: North Yorkshire
- Ambulance: Yorkshire
- UK Parliament: Thirsk and Malton

Bossall is a hamlet in North Yorkshire, England with fewer than 100 residents.

The village was part of the Ryedale district between 1974 and 2023. It is now administered by North Yorkshire Council.

The Church of St Botolph was built in the 12th century with later alterations and is a Grade I listed building. The name Bossall was possibly from the name of 7th-century bishop Bosa of York who was said to have built a church here, however, A. H. Smith states it is from Old English meaning Bot's nook of land. In 1807 a hoard of Viking silver coins and objects was discovered between Bossall and Flaxton (the Bossall-Flaxton hoard).

The community is mentioned in the Domesday Book as Boscele and as Bosciale in the hundred of Bulford; at that time, the property was held by "Hugh, son of Baldric" or Hugh fitzBaldric and included a church. In 1086, there were 19 residents in approximately 6.9 households, in addition to a priest. This property produced an annual income of "3 pounds in 1086; 2 pounds 10 shillings in 1066".

Records from 1823 indicate that there were only three houses and a population of 31, increasing to 76 by 1842; archaeological evidence showed that the village was previously much larger. It is thought to have been devastated by the Black Death in 1349. Centuries ago, the community included a quadrangular castle built in the 1300s by Paulinus de Bossall which was replaced by the current manor built in the 17th century; stone from the original castle walls was used in that project. By 1923, there was no village per-se here, "the church having in close proximity only the rectory, a modern building, and Bossall Hall".

== Bossall Hall ==
From the early 1300s until the 1420s the manor was held by Paulinus de Bossall and his descendants, after which time it was owned by the Redman or Redmayne family from whom it was later passed by marriage to the Thwaites. In the 1620s it was sold to William Belt. It was around this time that Bossall Hall was built. Although Sir Robert Belt was dispossessed following the English Civil War, the family continued to hold the manor until the late 1880s.

In 1890, the manor was sold to Sir James Walker, 2nd Baronet (Sand Hutton). As of 2020, the (now-dry) medieval moat with a brick bridge still remains, as does a 12-foot-high walled kitchen garden and another small garden. The manor is Grade II listed, and the earth-covered banks beside the moat are designated as a Scheduled Ancient Monument.

== Church of St Botolph ==
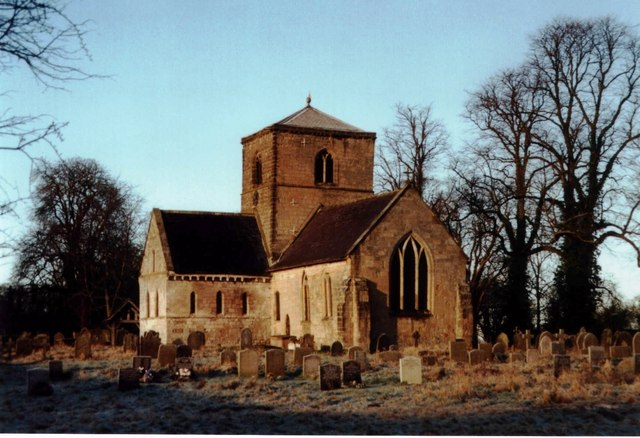
Church and churchyard in Bossall

St Botolph's Church, Bossall, dates from around 1180, though as many as three earlier churches may have occupied the site. It is grade I listed.

== See also ==
- Listed buildings in Buttercrambe with Bossall
