= All Saints' Church, Foston =

Anglican church in North Yorkshire, England

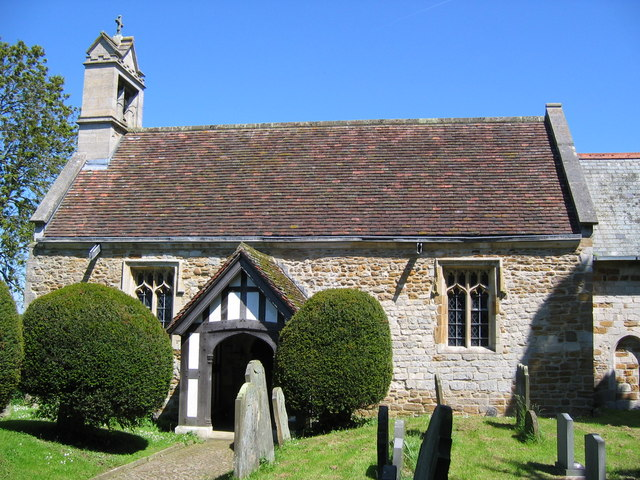
- The church, in 2006

- Location within North Yorkshire
- 54°04′40″N 0°55′59″W
- OS grid reference: SE 69908 65170

All Saints' Church is the parish church of Foston, North Yorkshire, a village in England.

The church was built in the early 12th century, from which period most of the walls survive. It is known that there was further work on the church in the late 13th century, although nothing from this time survives. The west window was replaced in the 15th century, and most of the west wall was rebuilt. In 1911, a new north aisle was added, with the old north door reset into the new north wall. A bellcote and porch were also added, and the east window was replaced. The church was grade II* listed in 1954.

The church is built in limestone, gritstone, and sandstone, and has a roof of stone slate and tile. It consists of a nave, a north aisle, and a chancel with a north vestry, and on the west gable is a bellcote. The porch is timber framed and gabled, and contains a round-arched doorway with two moulded orders, detached shafts, the left fluted, with scalloped capitals and square abaci. Above it is a hood mould on beakheads, which is richly carved with medallions depicting various scenes and people. There is also a re-set Norman north doorway. Inside, there is a circular 12th century font, and a 12th-century piscina.

== See also ==
- Grade II* listed churches in North Yorkshire (district)
- Listed buildings in Foston, North Yorkshire
