= Foston, North Yorkshire =

Village and civil parish in North Yorkshire, England

Coordinates: 54°04′39″N 0°56′03″W

Foston
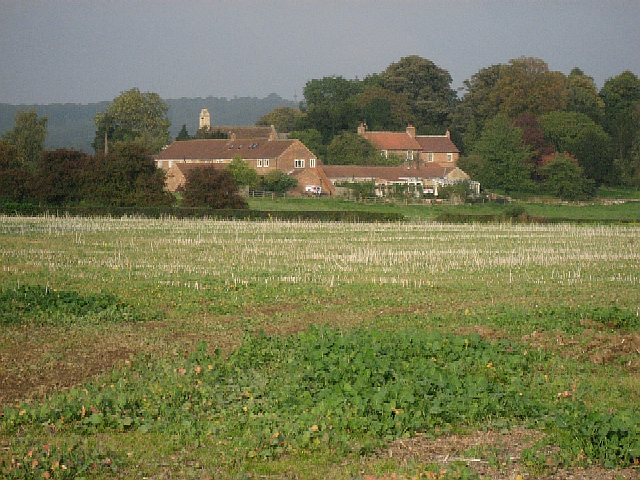
- Looking north-east to Foston

- Location within North Yorkshire
- Population: 263
- OS grid reference: SE698651
  - London: 180 mi (290 km) SSE
- Civil parish: Foston
- Unitary authority: North Yorkshire
- Ceremonial county: North Yorkshire
- Region: Yorkshire and the Humber
- Country: England
- Sovereign state: United Kingdom
- Post town: YORK
- Postcode district: YO60
- Police: North Yorkshire
- Fire: North Yorkshire
- Ambulance: Yorkshire
- UK Parliament: Thirsk and Malton

Foston is a small village and civil parish in North Yorkshire, England. The population of the civil parish as of the 2011 census was 263. Details are included in the civil parish of Whitwell-on-the-Hill. It is situated close to the A64 road and is approximately 9 miles (14 km) north-east from York.

== History ==
The village is mentioned in the Domesday Book as "Fostun" in the Bulford hundred. At the time it was the possession of Earl Morcar, but had passed to Count Alan of Brittany by 1086. It was also recorded that there was a church here. The etymology of the name is from Old Scandinavian meaning "Fotr's settlement".

== Governance ==
The village lies within the Thirsk and Malton UK Parliament constituency. It also lies within the Sheriff Hutton & Derwent electoral division of North Yorkshire Council.

Between 1974 until 2023 the village was part of the Ryedale district.

== Geography ==
According to the 1881 UK Census the population was 99. Local council estimates the current population as 50. The nearest settlements are Thornton-le-Clay 0.7 miles (1.1 km) to the west; Bulmer, North Yorkshire 1.5 miles (2.4 km) to the north; Whitwell-on-the-Hill 1.7 miles (2.7 km) to the east and Barton Hill, North Yorkshire 1 mile (1.6 km) to the south-east. To the east of the village is Spittal Beck, a tributary of the River Derwent.

The village is the site of a Scheduled monument, this being a medieval settlement and moated monastic grange. In addition to the church, Foston Rectory is Grade II* listed and Foston Hall is a Grade II listed buildings.

== Religion ==
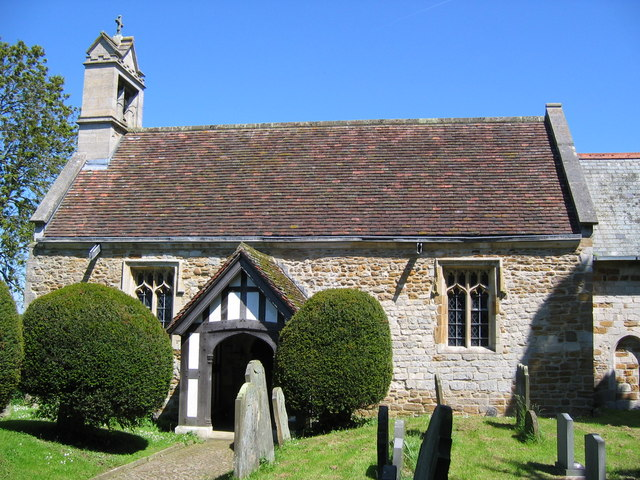
All Saints Church, Foston

The presence of a church in the village was recorded at the time of the Norman invasion, but the present building, All Saints' Church, Foston, dates from the 12th century with subsequent renovations. It is a Grade II* listed building.

== Notable residents ==
The noted English writer and Anglican cleric, Sydney Smith, was rector of the parish from 1806 until 1829 and resident in the village from 1809.

== See also ==
- Listed buildings in Foston, North Yorkshire
