= Buttercrambe =

Village in North Yorkshire, England

Coordinates: 54°00′54″N 0°52′53″W

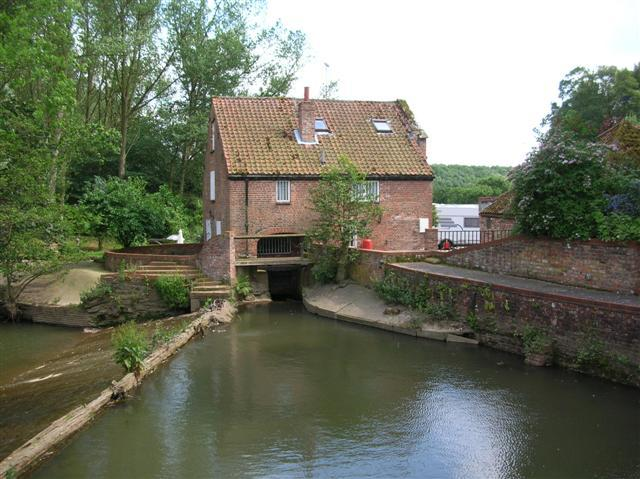
- The Old Corn Mill at Buttercrambe is now a private home

- Location within North Yorkshire
- OS grid reference: SE732581
  - London: 170 mi (270 km) S
- Civil parish: Buttercrambe with Bossall
- Unitary authority: North Yorkshire
- Ceremonial county: North Yorkshire
- Region: Yorkshire and the Humber
- Country: England
- Sovereign state: United Kingdom
- Post town: YORK
- Postcode district: YO41
- Police: North Yorkshire
- Fire: North Yorkshire
- Ambulance: Yorkshire
- UK Parliament: Thirsk and Malton

Buttercrambe is a small village in the Buttercrambe with Bossall civil parish, in North Yorkshire, England. Buttercrambe is some 9 miles (14 km) north-east of York, and on average about 56 feet (17 m) above sea level. The settlement is mentioned in the Domesday Book of 1086, and the name derives from the Old English of butere and crambe. Crambe is a word meaning bend, and so Buttercrambe's literal translation is rich piece of land in the bend of the river (Derwent).

The village is situated approximately 8 miles (13 km) to the north-east of York and near the border with the East Riding of Yorkshire. It, with Bossall parish, had a recorded population of about 100 in the 2001 Census, and 105 in the 2011 Census. The village lies on the River Derwent, and Buttercrambe Mill, a former water-powered cornmill, is still on the riverside and is now a grade II listed building.

The village was part of the Ryedale district between 1974 and 2023. It is now administered by North Yorkshire Council.

Aldby Hall and the St John the Evangelist's Church are at the centre of the village. Aldby park was the location that the Darley family brought the celebrated racehorse Darley Arabian to in 1704. The church is 30-foot (9.1 m) by 15-foot (4.6 m), and has been tied to the parish church at Sand Hutton since 1404. To the west of Buttercrambe, on high ground, are the remains of a Roman temporary camp: a square enclosure, ditched and banked, constructed quickly by an army on manoeuvres in enemy territory and used either overnight or for a short period of time, and demolished upon abandonment of the site. The camp was constructed probably 20 years before the establishment of nearby Eboracum, Roman York, in 71 AD.

The remains of Buttercrambe Castle lie in the village (to the east of Aldby Park). The castle fell to the Parliamentarians during a skirmish in the English Civil War.

== See also ==
- Listed buildings in Buttercrambe with Bossall

== Gallery ==
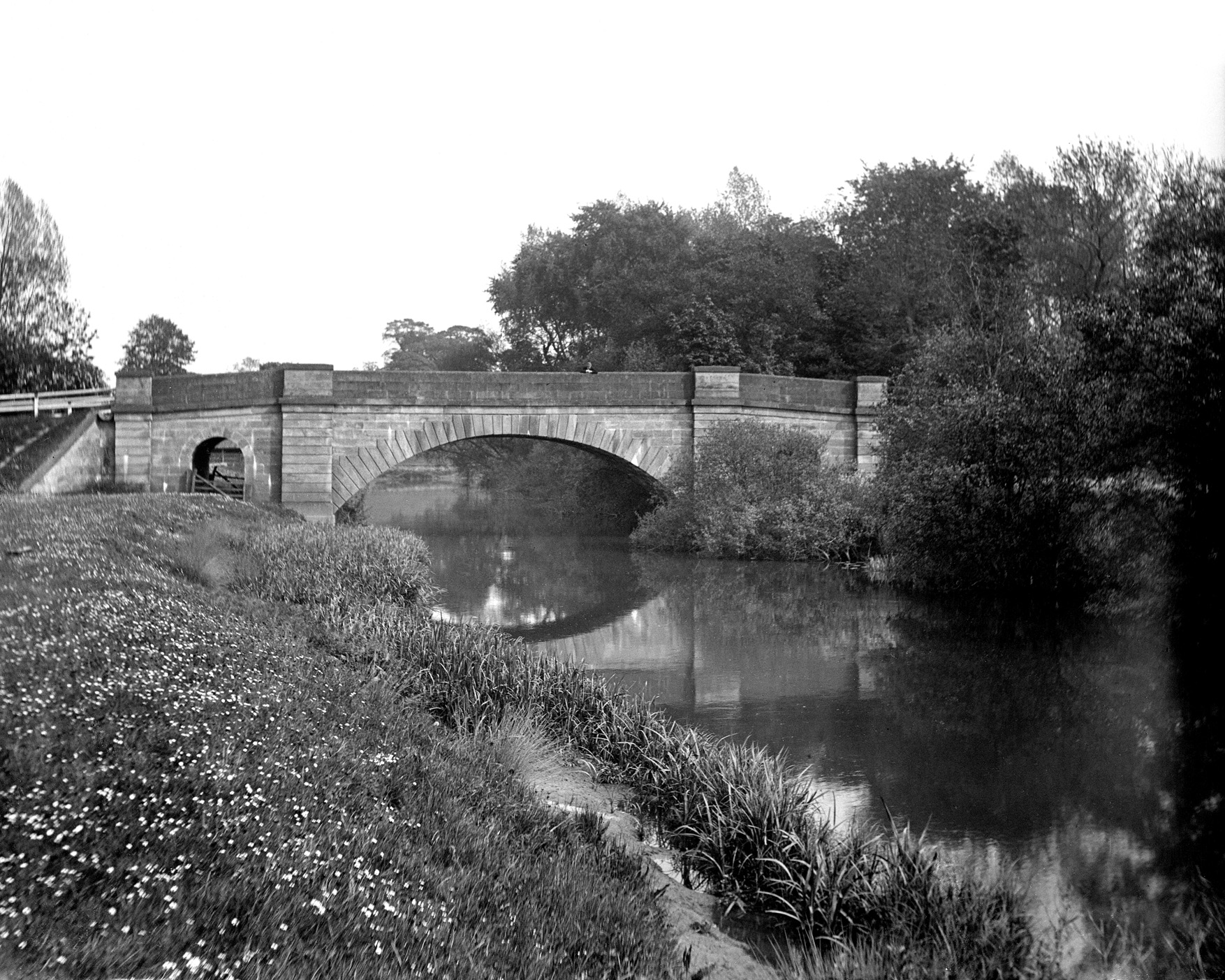
Buttercrambe Bridge in c. 1910

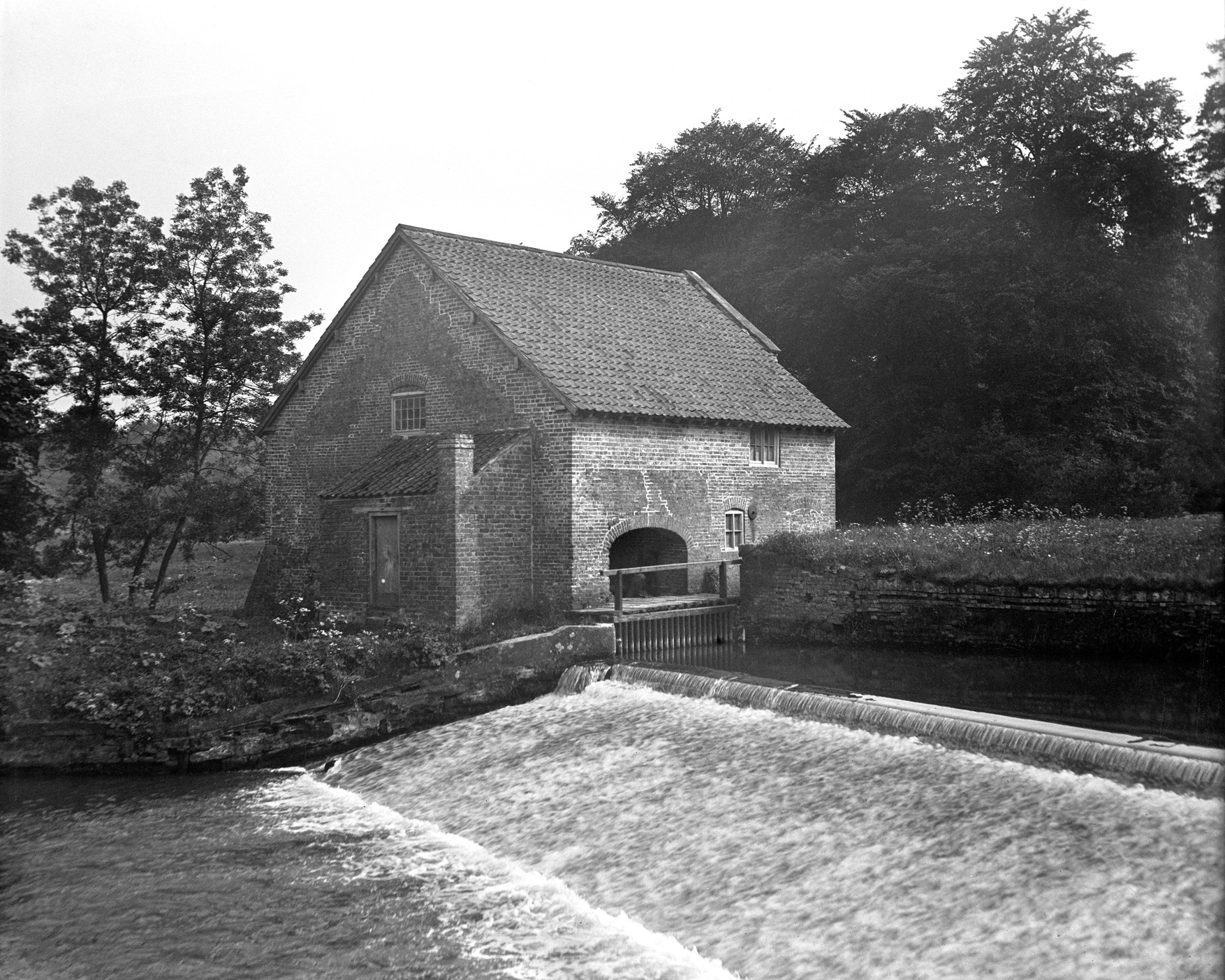
Buttercrambe Weir in c. 1910

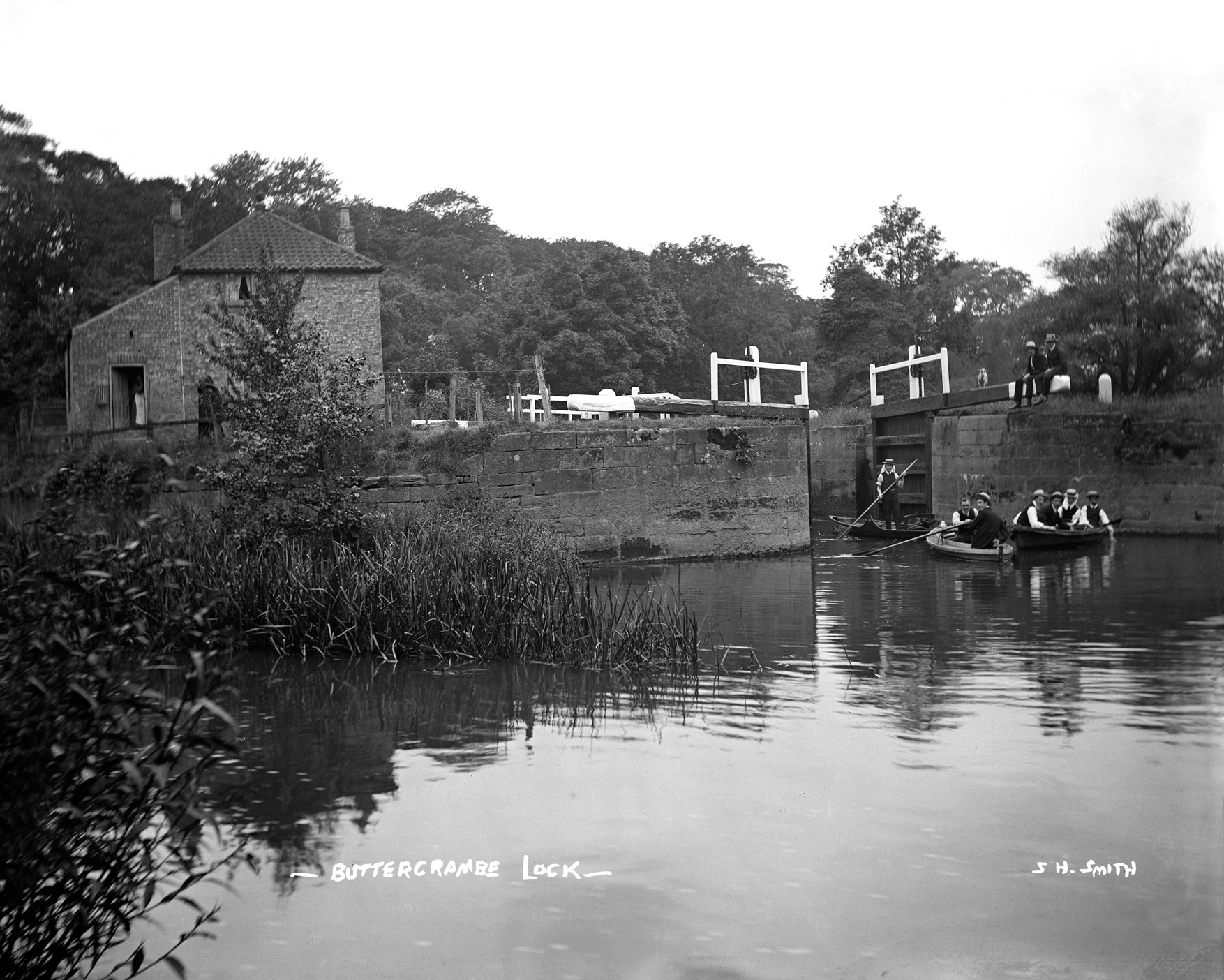
Buttercrambe Lock in c. 1910
