= Beakhead =

Sailing ship element

A beakhead or beak is the protruding part of the foremost section of a sailing ship.

Beakheads were fitted on sailing vessels from the 16th to the 18th century and served as working platforms for sailors working the sails of the bowsprit, the forward-pointing mast that carries the spritsails. The beakhead would be one of the most ornate sections of a ship, particularly in the extravagant Baroque-style ships of the 17th century. The sides were often decorated with carved statues and located directly underneath was the figurehead, usually in the form of animals, shields or mythological creatures. The beakhead also housed the crew's toilets (head), which would drop refuse straight into the sea without sullying the ship's hull unnecessarily.

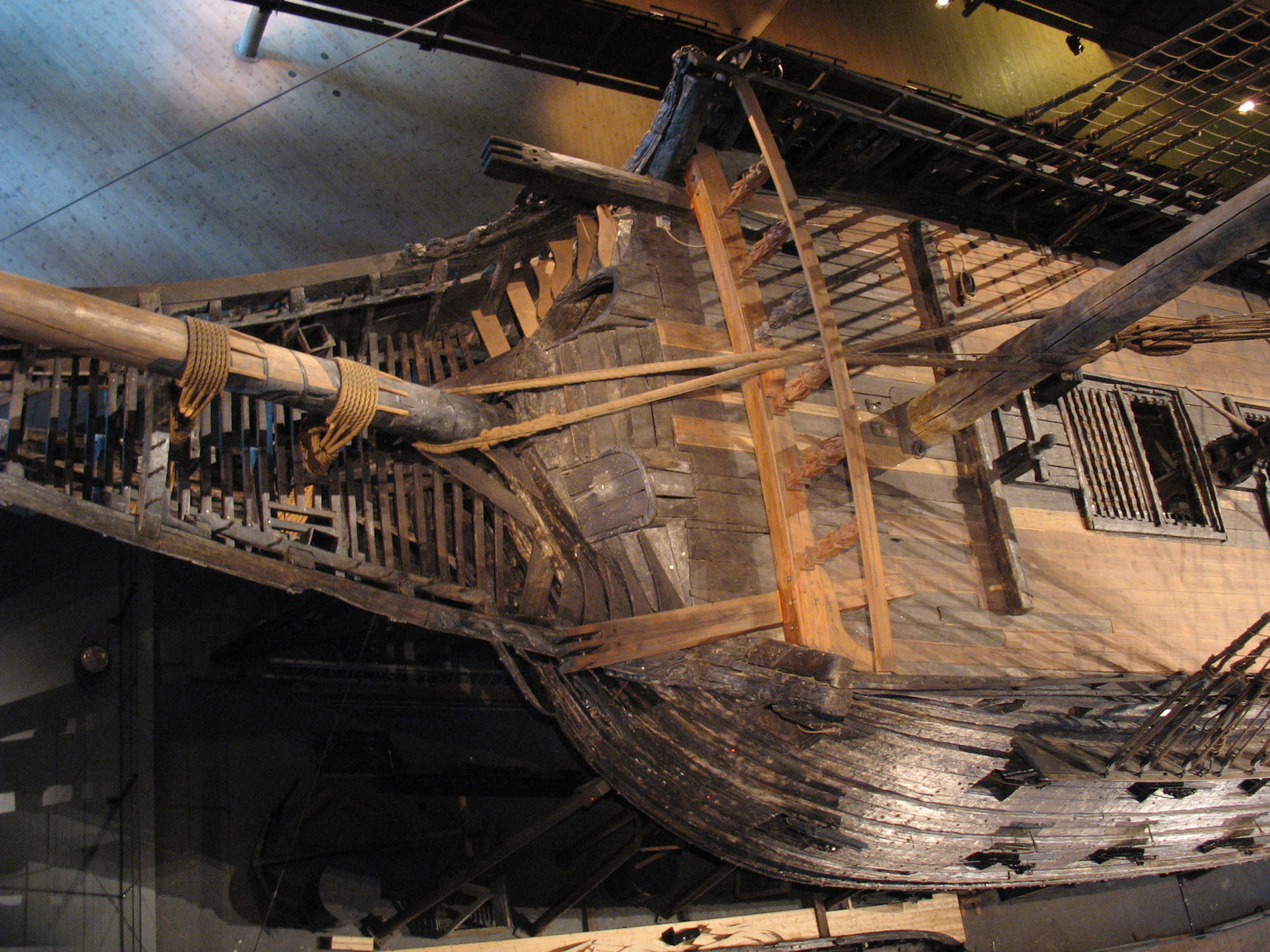
The bow and beakhead of the 17th century warship Vasa (ship) seen from above. The small square holes on either side of the bowsprit are the toilets.

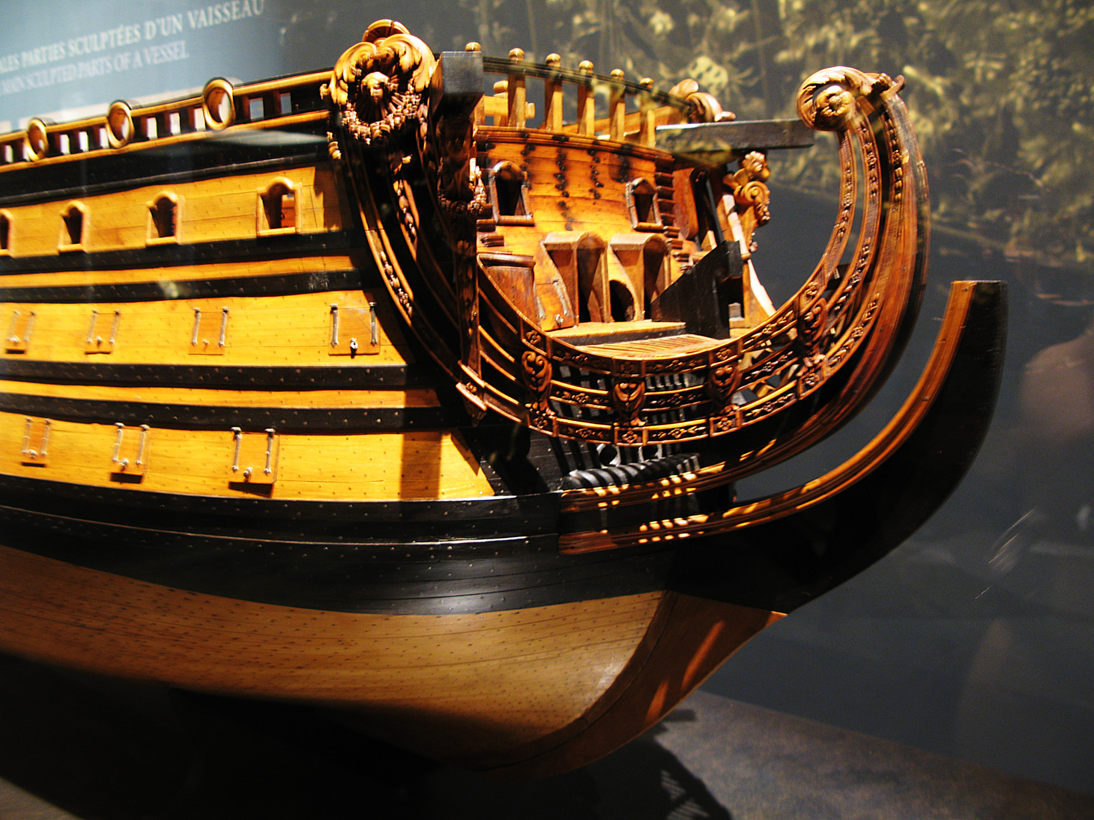
Beakhead of Soleil Royal
