= Harton, North Yorkshire =

Village and civil parish in North Yorkshire, England

Coordinates: 54°03′N 00°55′W

Harton
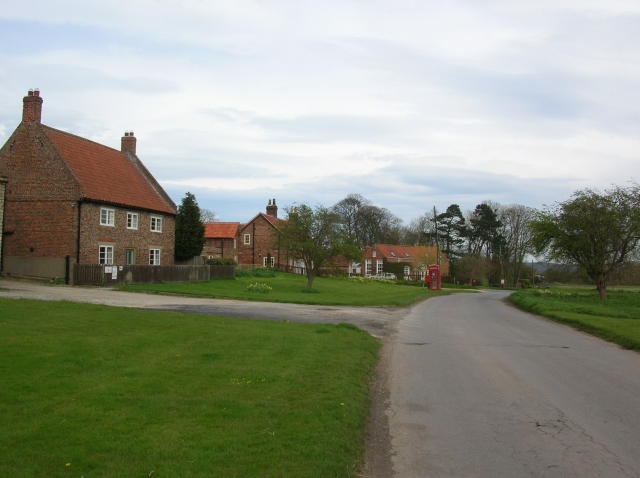
- Street in Harton

- Location within North Yorkshire
- Population: 99 (2021 census)
- Civil parish: Harton
- Unitary authority: North Yorkshire
- Ceremonial county: North Yorkshire
- Region: Yorkshire and the Humber
- Country: England
- Sovereign state: United Kingdom
- Police: North Yorkshire
- Fire: North Yorkshire
- Ambulance: Yorkshire

Harton is a village and civil parish in North Yorkshire, England. The population of the civil parish was less than 99 at the 2021 Census. However, in 2015, North Yorkshire County Council estimated the population to be 80. It was part of the Ryedale district between 1974 and 2023. It is now administered by North Yorkshire Council.

The name Harton derives from Old English. The second element is derived from tūn meaning 'settlement'. The first element is thought to be derived from either hær meaning 'heap of stones', here meaning 'army', or the personal name Herra.

== See also ==
- Listed buildings in Harton, North Yorkshire
