= St Botolph's Church, Bossall =

Church in North Yorkshire, England

Coordinates: 54°02′16″N 0°54′17″W

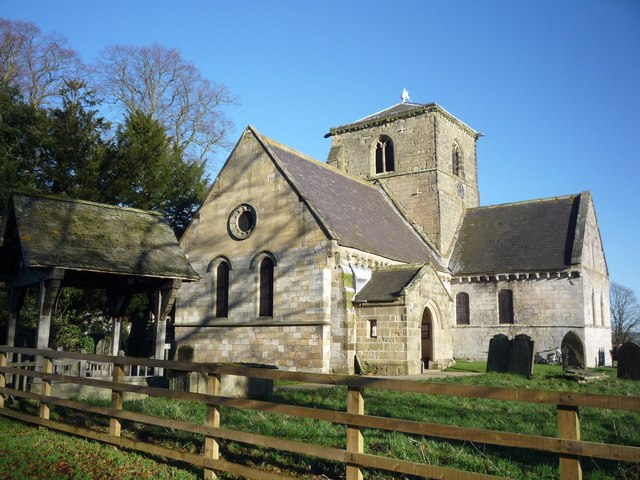
The church, in 2012

St Botolph's Church is the parish church of Bossall, a village in North Yorkshire, in England.

The current church, dedicated to St Botolph, dates from around 1180, though as many as three earlier churches may have occupied the site. One of these is thought to have been built by the Bosa of York. The church is cruciform and approximately 94 feet (29 m) in length. The transepts, nave and part of the tower are original, but the chancel was rebuilt in the 13th century and alterations were later made to the upper part of the tower. The Borthwick Institute holds copies of the parish records which date to the early 17th century.

The Church of England records include this background information about the parish:

A vicarage was ordained at Bossall in 1229. The rectory and advowson of the church initially descended with the manor of Bossall but by 1378 it had passed to the Nevill family. At some point between 1378 and 1386 it was alienated to Durham Priory by John Nevill for the maintenance of Durham College, Oxford. The advowson was fully appropriated to the college c.1404, and the college retained it until the Dissolution of the Monasteries when it was granted by the King to the Dean and Chapter of Durham.

A report published in 1839 states that the church was suffering from neglect at that time, although the interior walls had been recently cleaned. The vicarage, a white Elizabethan house built in 1838 and the home of Rev. Bolton Simpson at that time, was located nearby. It was restored in 1859, during which process the west gable was rebuilt, and a south porch was added. The church was Grade I listed in 1953.

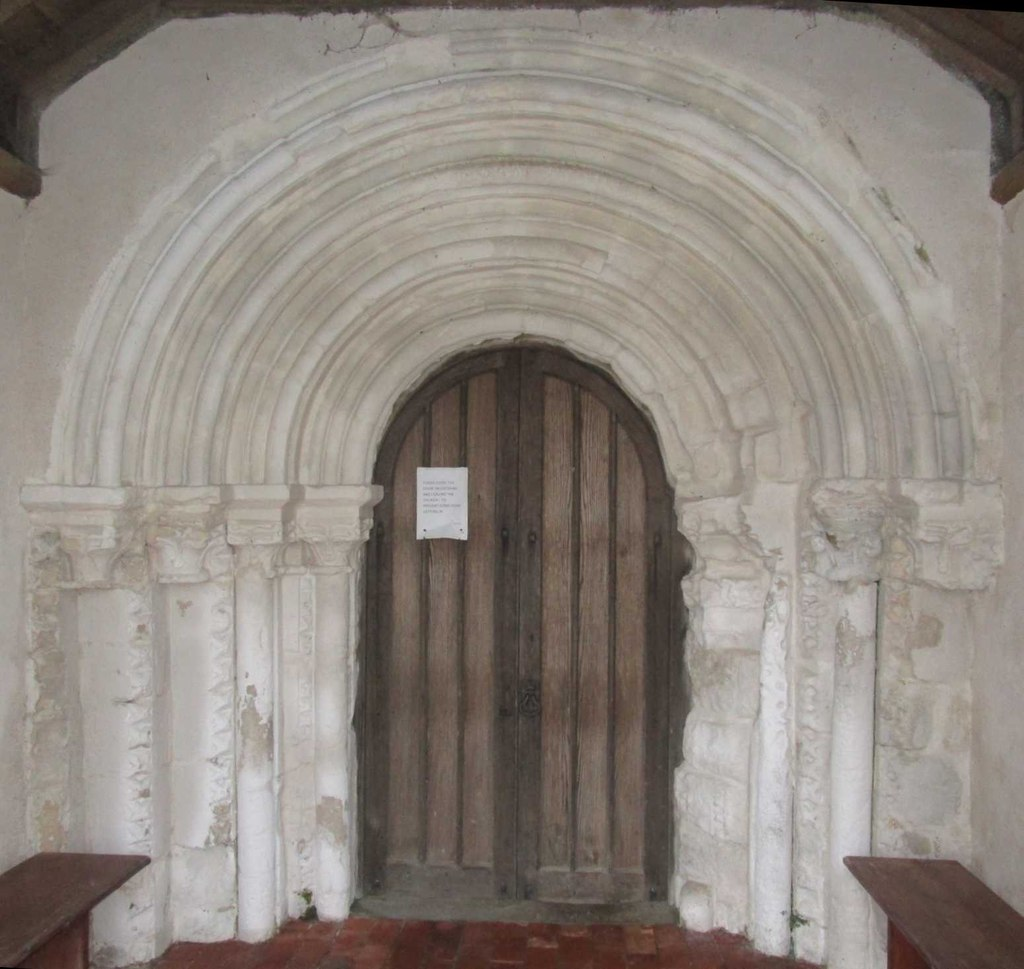
The south door

The church is built of limestone and sandstone and has a Welsh slate roof. It has a cruciform plan, consisting of a nave with a south porch, north and south transepts, a chancel, and a tower at the crossing. The tower, nave and transepts have a string course and a corbel table. The south porch has a moulded round-headed arch with four orders of shafts with dogtooth and stylised flower decoration, and waterleaf capitals. The doorway in the north porch is similar, but with only one order. Many of the windows are lancets, while others are Perpendicular, and there are a couple of round-headed windows.

Inside the church is a 14th-century font with a 17th-century cover, and a painting of the Royal Arms from 1710. Monuments include a brass figure commemorating Robert Constable, a former chancellor of Dunelm, who died in the 1540s, and several memorials to members of the Belt family.

== See also ==
- Grade I listed buildings in North Yorkshire (district)
- Listed buildings in Buttercrambe with Bossall
