= Crambe, North Yorkshire =

Village and civil parish in North Yorkshire, England

Coordinates: 54°04′29″N 0°52′54″W

Crambe
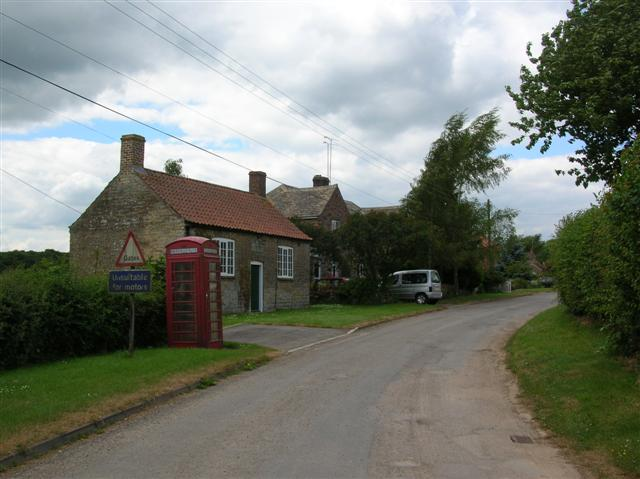
- Crambe

- Location within North Yorkshire
- OS grid reference: SE 7333 6500
  - London: 180 mi (290 km) S
- Civil parish: Crambe
- Unitary authority: North Yorkshire
- Ceremonial county: North Yorkshire
- Region: Yorkshire and the Humber
- Country: England
- Sovereign state: United Kingdom
- Post town: YORK
- Postcode district: YO60
- Police: North Yorkshire
- Fire: North Yorkshire
- Ambulance: Yorkshire
- UK Parliament: Thirsk and Malton

Crambe is a village and civil parish in the county of North Yorkshire, England. It is near the River Derwent and 6 miles (10 km) south-west of Malton. The population as of the 2011 census was less than 100. Details are included in the civil parish of Whitwell-on-the-Hill. The village is located in the Howardian Hills Area of Outstanding Natural Beauty. The father of the renowned mathematician Karl Pearson was born in the village.

== History ==
Crambe is mentioned in the Domesday Book as "Cranbone" in the Bulford Hundred. There were two manors of land in the parish at that time. One belonged to Sumarlithi, son of Karli, which was passed to the King and then to Robert Brus, and the other to Earl Waltheof, which was given to Count Robert of Mortain following the execution in 1076 of the Earl. The lands have also been in the ownership of Walter Percehay, before both areas of land being joined at some time in the sixteenth century. From that time, the land has been owned by Thomas Bamburgh (of Howsham); Sir John Wentworth and his descendants to 1741; thence to the Cholmely family and to Sir George Strickland.

The name of the village is derived from the Anglo-Saxon word crumb, meaning "a bend in the river".

The village was served by Howsham railway station on the York to Scarborough Line between 1845 and 1849, though it is shown as "Crambe station" on Moule's 1850s maps of North and East Yorkshire.

=== School ===
The school at Crambe was built by local landowner Colonel Cholmley of Howsham in 1841 and is a Grade II listed building. The small single storey building was one of many erected by the Colonel and his wife during the 19th century, such as the Cholmley School in Whitby, the family's old seat. The Cholmley's are related to the ancient family of Cholmondeley in Cheshire. The school is no longer in use.

== Governance ==
Crambe is part of the Thirsk and Malton UK Parliament constituency. From 1974 to 2023 it was part of the district of Ryedale, it is now administered by the unitary North Yorkshire Council.

== Geography ==
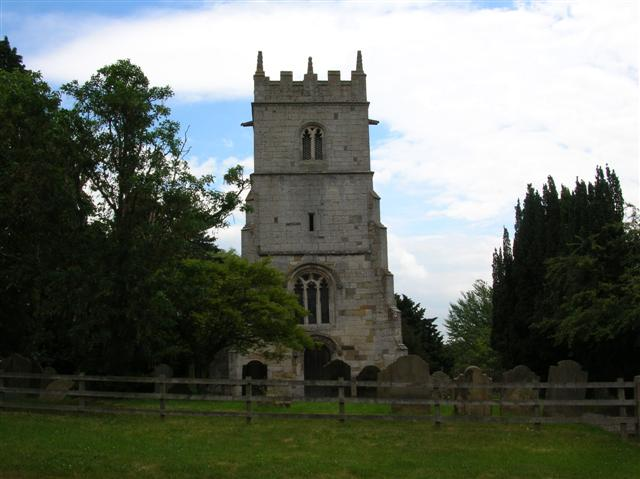
St Michael's Church, Crambe

The village is at an elevation of 160 feet (49 m) above sea level, lies 0.6 miles (0.97 km) from the A64 road and within a bend in the River Derwent, Yorkshire. The nearest settlements to Crambe are Kirkham 0.5 miles (0.8 km) to the north-east; Whitwell-on-the-Hill 0.9 miles (1.4 km) to the north-west; Barton Hill 1.6 miles (2.6 km) to the south-west and Howsham 1.43 miles (2.30 km) to the south. It is also near Kirkham Priory, Howsham Hall, and Castle Howard.

== Religion ==
St Michael's Church, Crambe, was originally built in the Norman period and partially restored at a later date.

== See also ==
- Listed buildings in Crambe, North Yorkshire
