= Howsham Bridge =

Bridge in Howsham, North Yorkshire, England

Coordinates: 54°03′12″N 0°52′59″W

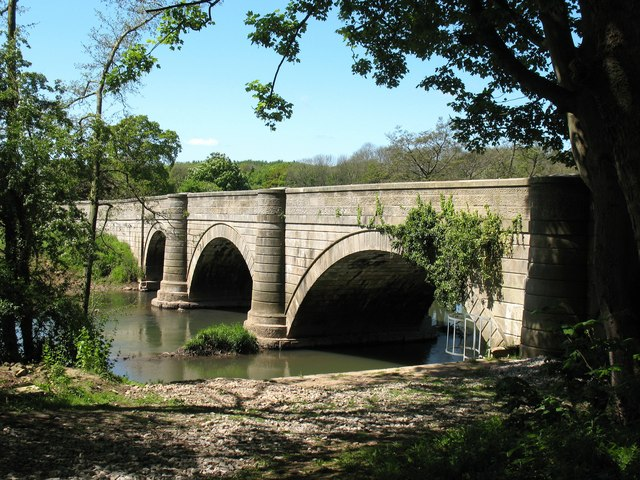
The bridge, in 2009

Howsham Bridge is a historic bridge across the River Derwent in North Yorkshire, in England.

A bridge on the road from Howsham to Barton-le-Willows was recorded by John Leland, but by 1612 it was reported as being in poor repair. The current bridge is generally described as dating from the late 18th century, but from 1813 to 1815, £5,977 was spent on the bridge, suggesting it was wholly rebuilt. It was grade II listed in 1987.

The bridge is built of sandstone, and consists of three segmental arches with rusticated voussoirs. It has tapering semi-cylindrical buttresses, a band, and a coped parapet, and at the ends are drums.

== See also ==
- Listed buildings in Howsham, North Yorkshire
