= Raincliffe =

Raincliffe may refer to:

- Raincliffe School
- Raincliffe Woods
