= St John's Church, Howsham =

Church in North Yorkshire, England

Coordinates: 54°03′24″N 0°52′30″W

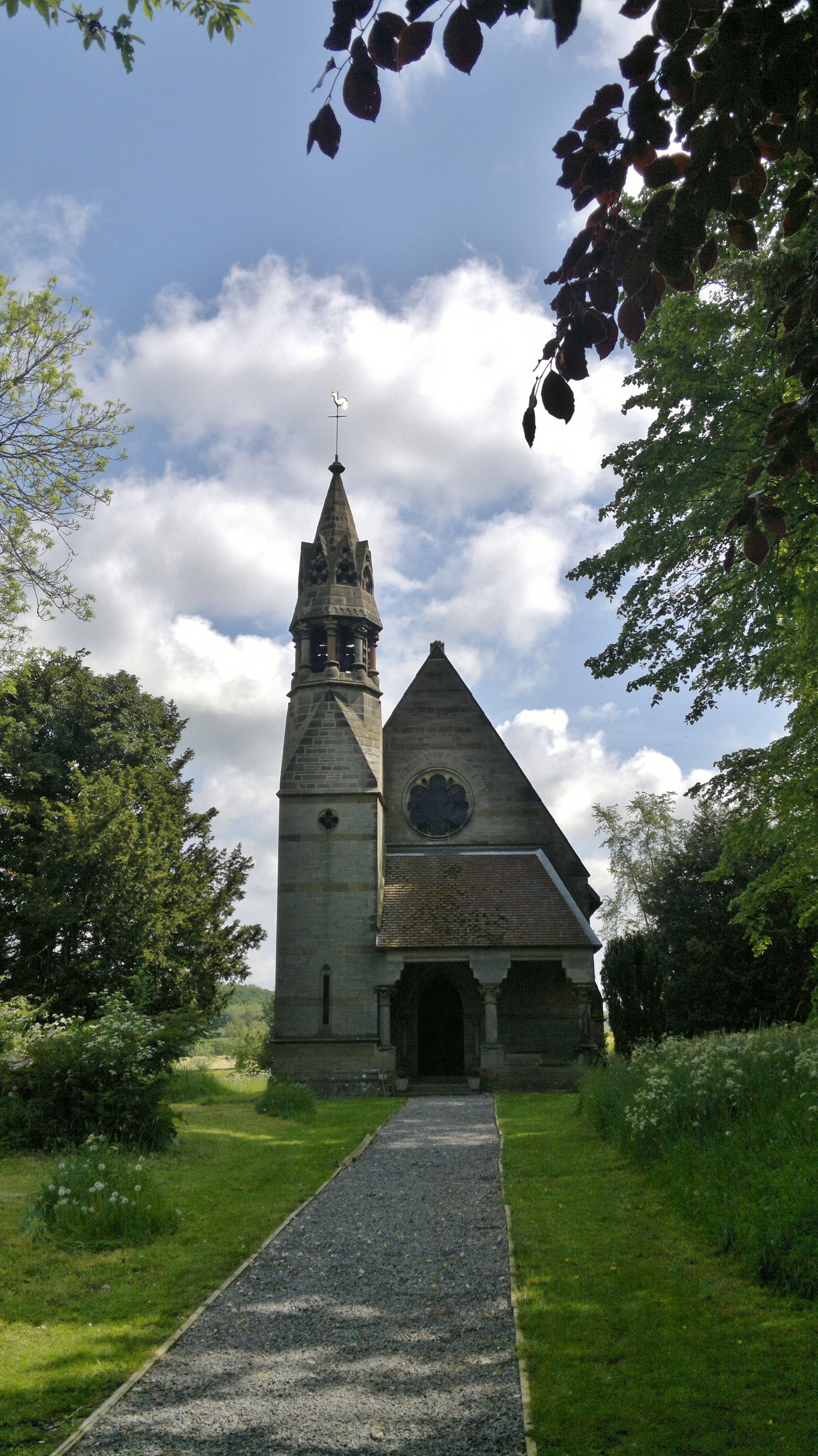
The church, in 2012

St John's Church is an Anglican church in Howsham, North Yorkshire, a village in England.

Until the mid 19th century, Howsham was in the parish of St Peter and St Paul's Church, Scrayingham. A church was constructed from 1859 to 1860, to a Geometrical Gothic design by G. E. Street. C. M. Smart describes it as having "many idiosyncrasies". It was grade I listed in 1966.

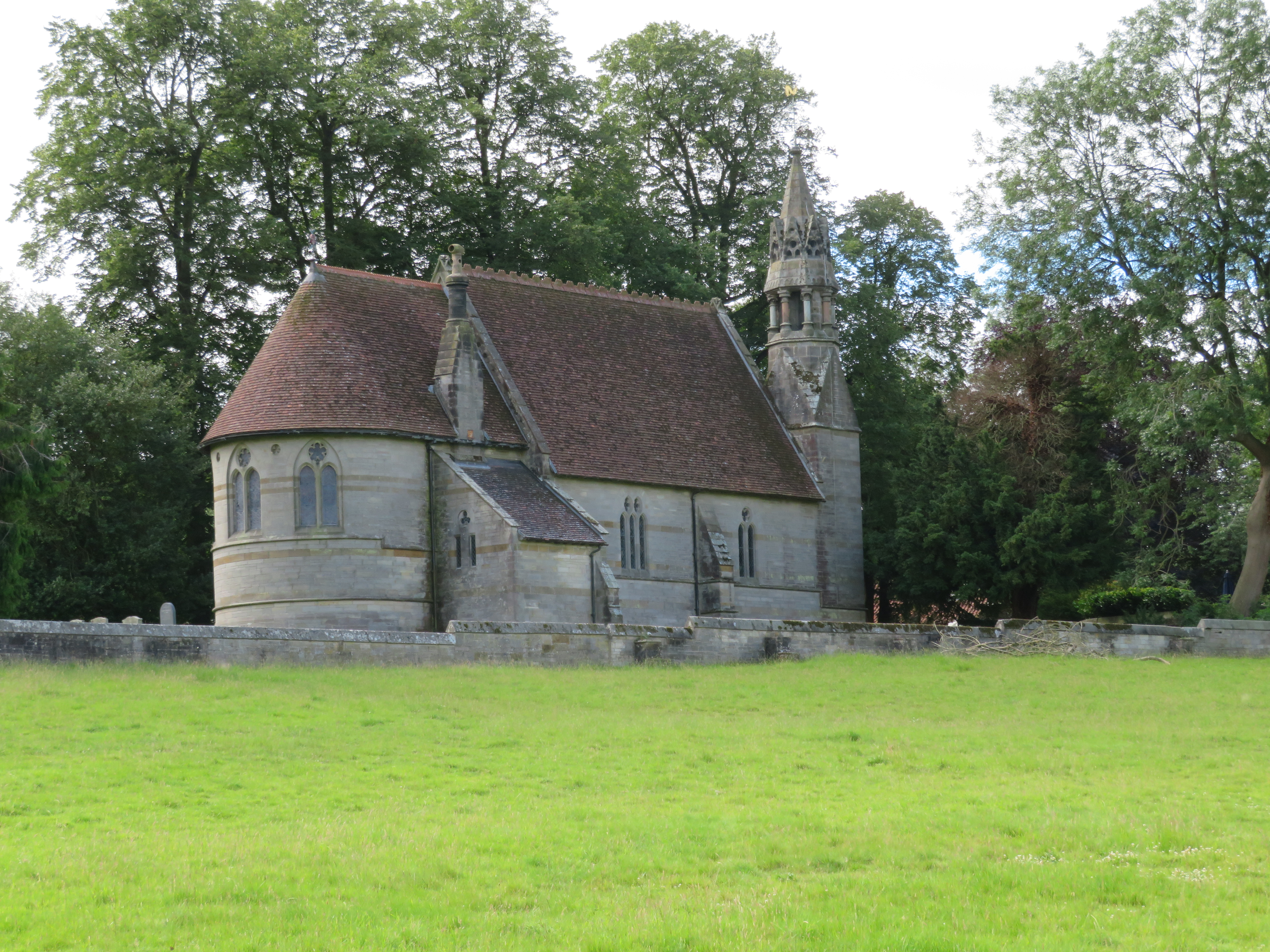
View from the northwest, in 2020

The church is built of gritstone with sandstone bands, and has a tile roof. It consists of a narthex, a northwest tower, a nave, and a chancel with an apse and a north vestry. The tower has three stages, a plinth and string courses. The middle stage is gabled, and the top stage is octagonal, the bell openings separated by alternate grey marble and orange stone columns, the grey ones with ornate Italianate capitals, and the tower is surmounted by a spire with lucarnes.

Inside, the font and pulpit are inlaid with multicoloured marble, and there is an aumbry and double sedilia. The elaborate reredos is by Thomas Earp, and there is a painted ceiling. The windows have stained glass by Clayton and Bell, and have been described as "plate-traceries which are indeed stars as seen from within".

== See also ==
- Grade I listed buildings in North Yorkshire (district)
- Listed buildings in Howsham, North Yorkshire
