= Listed buildings in Howsham, North Yorkshire =

Howsham is a civil parish in the county of North Yorkshire, England. It contains 26 listed buildings that are recorded in the National Heritage List for England. Of these, two are listed at Grade I, the highest of the three grades, and the others are at Grade II, the lowest grade. The parish contains the village of Howsham and the surrounding countryside. The listed buildings include a country house and associated structures. Most of the other listed buildings are houses, cottages, farmhouses and farm buildings, and the rest include a church, a bridge, a former school, a watermill and a telephone kiosk.

== Key ==
Grade	Criteria
I	Buildings of exceptional interest, sometimes considered to be internationally important
II	Buildings of national importance and special interest

== Buildings ==
Name and location	Photograph	Date	Notes	Grade
Howsham Hall; 54.05896°N 0.87991°W		c. 1610	A country house, later used for other purposes, in limestone, the servants' quarters in brick, with a Westmorland slate roof. There is a U-shaped plan, with the servants' wing at the rear, and each main front has a parapet with merlons and ball finials. The south front has two storeys and a cellar, and seven bays, the lower bays canted. In the middle bay is a full-height porch containing a doorway in an architrave, with a radial fanlight, flanked by paired Ionic columns on pedestals, and paired Corinthian columns above. The windows are mullioned and transomed. The west front has three storeys and contains a Tudor arched doorway. The east front has two storeys and six bays, and the servants' wing has two storeys and seven bays with a dentilled eaves course and a hipped roof, and contains Venetian windows.	I
1, 2 and 3 Main Street; 54.05527°N 0.87471°W	—	Late 17th century	A row of three cottages in sandstone, with massive quoins, and a steeply pitched pantile roof. There are two storeys and six bays. Each cottage has a doorway, and the windows are casements.	II
7 Main Street; 54.05587°N 0.87511°W	—	Late 17th century	The house is in sandstone with a steeply pitched pantile roof. There are two storeys and three bays. The doorway is to the left, and the windows are a mix of casements and horizontally sliding sashes.	II
10, 11 and 12 Main Street; 54.05632°N 0.87548°W		Late 17th century	A row of three cottages in sandstone, with massive quoins and a steeply pitched pantile roof. There are two storeys and six bays, and rear outshuts. Each cottage has a doorway, and the windows are a mix of casements and horizontally sliding sashes.	II
Town Farmhouse; 54.05496°N 0.87456°W	—	Late 17th to early 18th century	The house is in sandstone, with a wing in brick, and Roman tile roofs. The main block has two storeys and five bays, and the wing to the right has one storey. On the front is a gabled porch. Most of the windows are horizontally sliding sashes, there is one casement window in the upper floor and one in the wing.	II
Middlefield House; 54.05671°N 0.84577°W	—	Early 18th century	The house has a cruck frame, the walls are in sandstone, and the roof is thatched. There is a single storey with attics, and three bays. On the front is a doorway with a two-light horizontally sliding sash window to the left, a tripartite sash window and a casement to the right, and two attic dormers. Inside, there are two inglenook fireplaces.	II
13 and 14 Main Street; 54.05668°N 0.87576°W	—	Mid 18th century	A pair of cottages in sandstone, with brick gable ends, quoins, sprocketed eaves, and a pantile roof. There are two storeys and three bays. On the front are two doorways, and the windows are casements.	II
Farfield Farmhouse; 54.05858°N 0.83348°W	—	Mid 18th century	The farmhouse is in sandstone with brick facings, and it has a pantile roof with gable coping and shaped kneelers. There are two storeys, four bays, and a rear outshut with a catslide roof. On the front is a gabled porch, there is one casement window, and the other windows are horizontally sliding sashes.	II
The Mill House; 54.05546°N 0.87481°W	—	Mid 18th century	The house is in brick, with a floor band, tumbled eaves, and a pantile roof with gable coping. There are two storeys, three bays, and a rear outshut under a cat slide roof. The doorway has a divided fanlight, and the windows are horned sashes under flat brick arches.	II
Wood House; 54.06464°N 0.85599°W	—	Mid 18th century	The house is in limestone at the front and brick at the rear, and has sprocketed eaves, and a pantile M-shaped roof. There are two storeys, three bays, and a parallel rear range. On the front is a doorway, and the windows are sashes under chamfered stone lintels.	II
Stable block, Howsham Hall; 54.05808°N 0.87747°W		c. 1755	The stable block is in brick, with a band, a dentilled eaves course, two storeys, and a hipped Westmorland slate roof. It consists of stables, barns and accommodation around a central square yard. The entrance front has seven bays, the middle bay projecting under a pediment containing an oculus. This is surmounted by a pyramidal roof with a clock tower, a lantern and a cupola. The bay contains a Tuscan portico flanked by fixed windows, and the outer bays contain sash windows. In the south range is a re-sited datestone and a re-sited dated sundial in a pediment.	II
Howsham Mill; 54.05598°N 0.88630°W		c. 1755	The watermill is in brick faced with limestone. The main block has a square plan, two storeys, and three bays on each side, and to the right is a single-storey wheelhouse. The main block has a chamfered plinth, a floor band, and an eaves band. The middle bay on each side contains an ogee-headed recess with an architrave, containing a doorway or a window. In each outer bay is a window with a pointed head and a hood mould, and over it is a blind quatrefoil. Above is a pyramidal roof with crocketed finials. The wheelhouse has a wide elliptical arch.	II
Barn northeast of Farfield Farmhouse; 54.05883°N 0.83313°W	—	Mid to late 18th century	The barn, with a granary above, is in limestone and has a pantile roof with gable coping and shaped kneelers. There are two storeys and three bays. It contains a stable door and a circular opening to the left, and in the upper floor is a pitching door and two openings to the right. On the left are brick steps leading up to a door with a divided fanlight.	II
Old Holme Farmhouse and Hudson Cottage; 54.05738°N 0.87632°W	—	Mid to late 18th century	The house and adjoining cottage are in sandstone, faced on the front with brick, and with a tile roof. There are two storeys and five bays. On the front are two doorways, and sash windows, one with horizontally sliding sashes. Some of the lower ground windows have wedge lintels.	II
Howsham Bridge; 54.05343°N 0.88297°W		Late 18th century	The bridge carries a road over the River Derwent. It is in sandstone, and consists of three segmental arches with rusticated voussoirs. The bridge has tapering semi-cylindrical buttresses, a band, and a coped parapet, and at the ends are drums.	II
Folly west of Howsham Hall; 54.05897°N 0.88154°W		Late 18th century	The folly is in limestone, and has two storeys and five bays, the outer bays slightly recessed. In the ground floor is a round-arched doorway, flanked by pairs of blocked two-light mullioned windows. The upper floor contains three blocked roundels, and the roof is partly collapsed.	II
Gates and lodges, Howsham Hall; 54.05374°N 0.88216°W		Late 18th century	The entrance to the drive is flanked by sandstone lodges, with a hexagonal plan, in Gothic style, with moulded bands, and embattled parapets with rounded battlements. Each lodge has a moulded round-arched doorway and fluted capitals, and a mullioned window. Between the lodges are four square piers about 3 metres (9.8 ft) high, each with a moulded cornice and ball finial, and between each pair is a round-arched gateway with ornamental wooden gates.	II
Nearfield House; 54.05781°N 0.85096°W		Late 18th century	The house is in sandstone, and has a pantile roof with gable coping and shaped kneelers. There are two storeys, three bays, and a rear outshut under a catslide roof. The doorway is in the centre, in the main part are sash window under cambered arches, and in the outshut is a fixed window.	II
Barn and byres, Paradise Farm; 54.04758°N 0.88560°W	—	Late 18th century	The farm buildings are in limestone with a pantile roof. They consist of a central barn with byres along the length of each side beneath a continuous roof. In the gable end are double doors in an elliptical arch with a glazed pitching hole above, flanked by pivoting windows.	II
Barn north of Town Farmhouse; 54.05508°N 0.87457°W	—	Late 18th century	The barn is in sandstone and has a pantile roof with gable coping and shaped kneelers. There are two storeys, and the gable end faces the street. The barn contains two openings on the front, and a pitching door in the gable end.	II
Gally Gap Farmhouse; 54.06130°N 0.84466°W		Early 19th century	The house is in sandstone, and has a pantile roof with gable coping and shaped kneelers. There are two storeys, three bays, and a cross-wing and outshut at the rear. The central doorway has a fanlight, and the windows are sashes with wedge lintels.	II
Farm buildings, Gally Gap Farm; 54.06150°N 0.84377°W		1824–25	The farm buildings are in sandstone with brick dressings and pantile roofs, and are arranged around four sides of a courtyard. The east range has two storeys with a barn and a hayloft above. The other ranges have a single storey and include byres, sheds, and a hayloft with a pigeoncote to the west.	II
Shed north of Wood House; 54.06511°N 0.85616°W	—	Early 19th century	The shed is in limestone, with brick quoins, piers and facing, and a pantile roof with gable coping and shaped kneelers. There is a single storey and a loft, and the shed contains three segmental arches.	II
The Old School; 54.05559°N 0.87487°W	—	1852	The school, later converted into a house, is in limestone with a pantile roof. There is a single storey and three bays. In the centre is a doorway converted into a window, it is flanked by windows, and all the openings have ogee-arched heads. Above the middle window is an inscribed and dated plaque.	II
St John's Church; 54.05677°N 0.87501°W		1859–60	The church, designed by G. E. Street, is in gritstone with sandstone bands, and has a tile roof. It consists of a narthex, a northwest tower, a nave, and a chancel with an apse and a north vestry. The tower has three stages, a plinth and string courses. The middle stage is gabled, and the top stage is octagonal, the bell openings separated by alternate grey marble and orange stone columns, the grey ones with ornate Italianate capitals, and the tower is surmounted by a spire with lucarnes.	I
Telephone kiosk 54.05570°N 0.87503°W	—	1935	The K6 type telephone kiosk in Main Street was designed by Giles Gilbert Scott. Constructed in cast iron with a square plan and a dome, it has three unperforated crowns in the top panels.	II
