= St John's Church, Whitwell-on-the-Hill =

Church in North Yorkshire, England

Coordinates: 54.0839°N 0.8946°W

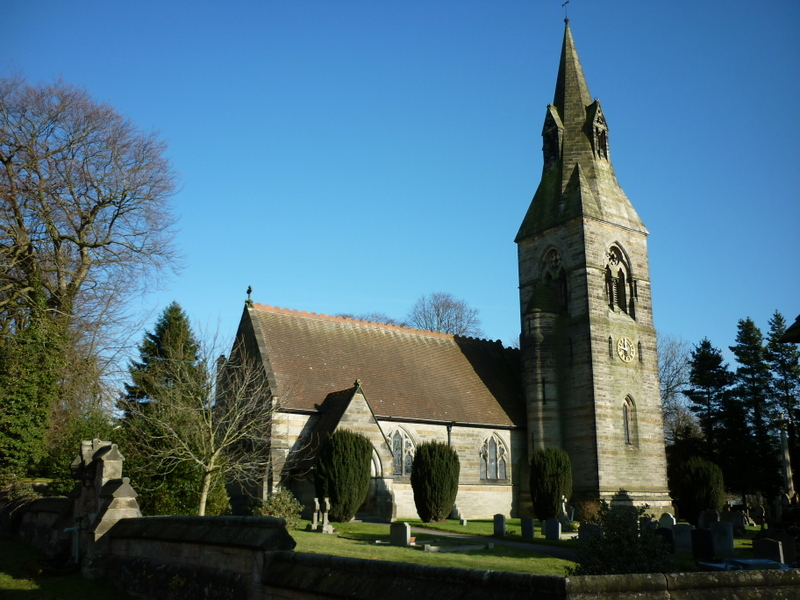
The church, in 2011

St John's Church is the parish church of Whitwell-on-the-Hill, a village in North Yorkshire, in England.

Until the mid-19th century, Whitwell was in the parish of St Michael's Church, Crambe. A church was constructed in the village between 1858 and 1860 by George Edmund Street, in a late-13th century neo-Gothic style. The building was grade II* listed in 1985.

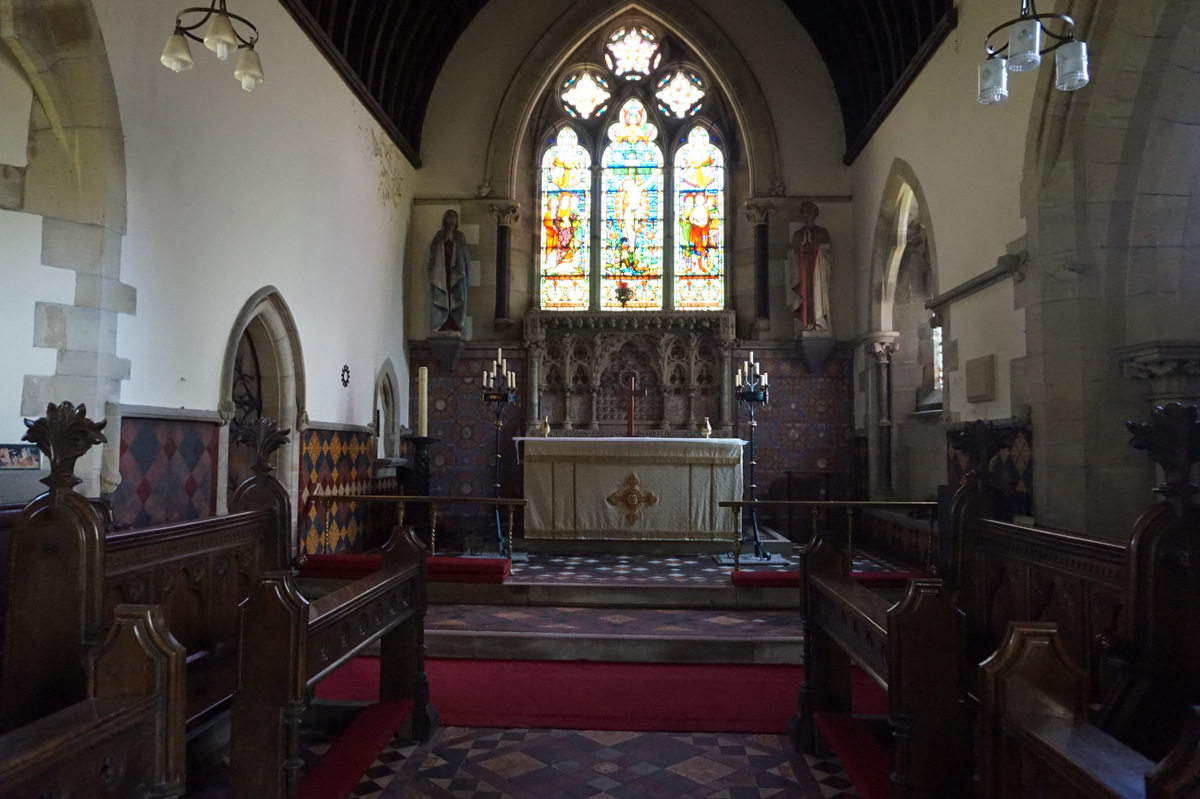
The chancel

The church is built in sandstone with a tile roof. It consists of a nave, a south porch, and a chancel with a north vestry and a south steeple. The steeple has a tower with two stages, a semicircular stair turret on the west, lancet windows, a south clock face, two-light bell openings with roundels above, and a broach spire with lucarnes. On the west front is a row of four lancet windows, and a rose window above containing roundels. Inside, the reredos, font and pulpit all have inlaid marble.

== See also ==
- Grade II* listed churches in North Yorkshire (district)
- Listed buildings in Whitwell-on-the-Hill
