= Barton Hill, North Yorkshire =

Village in North Yorkshire, England

Coordinates: 54.07127°N 0.91994°W

Barton Hill
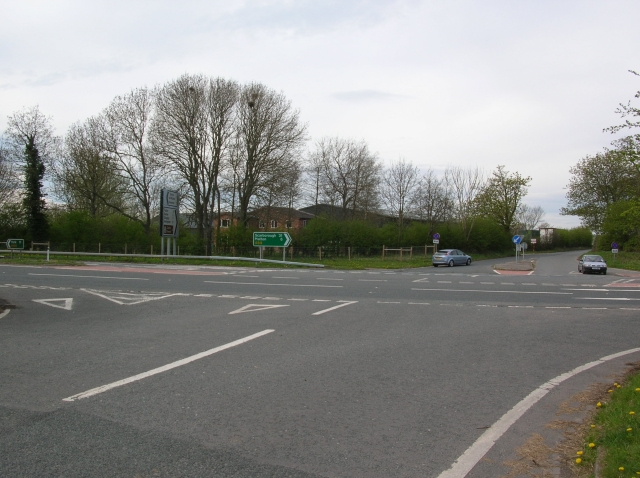
- Road junction in Barton Hill

- Location within North Yorkshire
- OS grid reference: SE707644
- Unitary authority: North Yorkshire
- Ceremonial county: North Yorkshire
- Region: Yorkshire and the Humber
- Country: England
- Sovereign state: United Kingdom
- Post town: YORK
- Postcode district: YO60
- Police: North Yorkshire
- Fire: North Yorkshire
- Ambulance: Yorkshire

Barton Hill is a village in North Yorkshire, off the A64 road, near Barton-le-Willows.

From 1974 to 2023 it was part of the district of Ryedale, it is now administered by the unitary North Yorkshire Council.

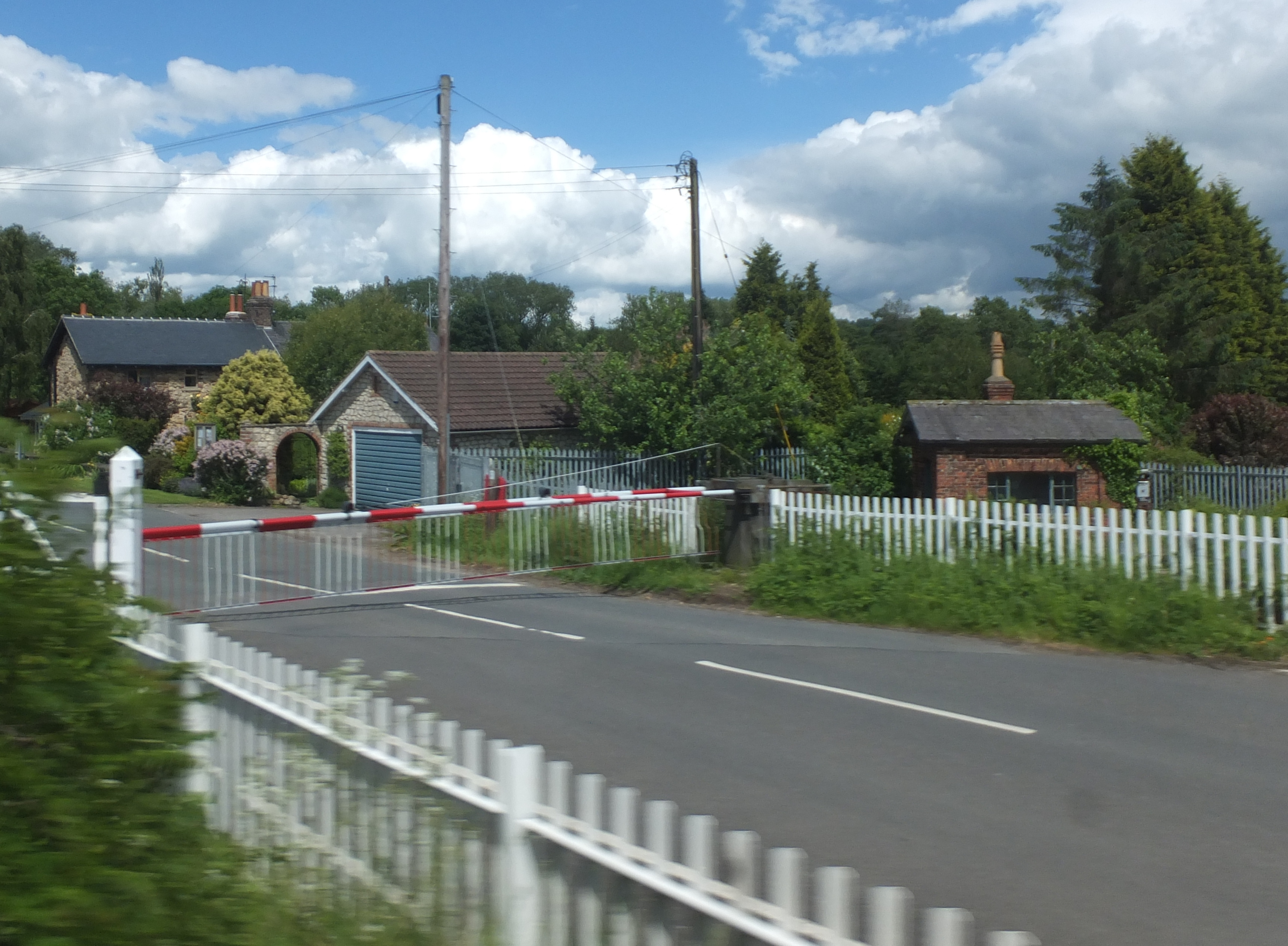
Level crossing in Barton Hill

Barton Hill was served by Barton Hill railway station on the York to Scarborough Line between 1845 and 1930.
