= Listed buildings in Scrayingham =

Scrayingham is a civil parish in the county of North Yorkshire, England. It contains six listed buildings that are recorded in the National Heritage List for England. Of these, one is listed at Grade II*, the middle of the three grades, and the others are at Grade II, the lowest grade. The parish contains the village of Scrayingham and the surrounding countryside. Apart from a barn, all the listed buildings are in the village, and consist of houses, a church and a former school.

== Key ==
Grade	Criteria
II*	Particularly important buildings of more than special interest
II	Buildings of national importance and special interest

== Buildings ==
Name and location	Photograph	Date	Notes	Grade
St Peter's Church; 54.03431°N 0.88258°W		7th or 8th century	The church has been altered and extended through the centuries, including a restoration and additions by G. T. Andrews in 1853. It is built in gritstone and magnesian limestone, with grey slate roofs. The church consists of a nave, a south aisle, a chancel and a northeast vestry. On the west gable end is a bellcote.	II*
Leppington Grange Barn; 54.04789°N 0.84297°W	—	17th century	The barn is in sandstone with a brick gable end and a pantile roof. There is a single storey and four bays, and it contains a blocked doorway and window. Inside, there are three half-cruck trusses.	II
The Old Rectory; 54.03295°N 0.88468°W	—	c.1704	The rectory, later a private house, is in rendered and colourwashed red brick and has a hipped slate roof with overhanging eaves. There are two storeys, an H-shaped plan, and a three-storey north wing. The east front has a recessed centre and a pedimented porch. Most of the windows are sashes, and on the south front are canted bay windows. The west front has a doorway with a pedimented surround.	II
Japonica Cottage; 54.03007°N 0.88484°W	—	Early to mid-18th century	The house is in brick with a floor band and a pantile roof. There are two storeys and three bays. The windows are casements, those in the ground floor with elliptical brick arches.	II
Village Farmhouse; 54.03114°N 0.88476°W	—	Early 19th century	The house is in brick, and has two storeys, three bays and a rear cross-wing. The doorway has a fanlight, and the windows are sashes with flat brick arches.	II
Church hall 54.03425°N 0.88191°W		1853	Originally a school, later used for other purposes, it is in red brick with stone dressings, quoins and a grey slate roof. There is a single storey and three bays, and it consists of a single room with a porch, and a kitchen at the rear. The middle bay has a gable with a bargeboard and contains a mullioned and transomed window, above which is a datestone. The outer bays contain two-light mullioned windows.	II
