= Listed buildings in Whitwell-on-the-Hill =

Whitwell-on-the-Hill is a civil parish in the county of North Yorkshire, England. It contains six listed buildings that are recorded in the National Heritage List for England. Of these, one is listed at Grade II*, the middle of the three grades, and the others are at Grade II, the lowest grade. The parish contains the village of Whitwell-on-the-Hill and the surrounding countryside. The listed buildings consist of a country house and associated structures, a church, a railway signal box and a milepost.

== Key ==
Grade	Criteria
II*	Particularly important buildings of more than special interest
II	Buildings of national importance and special interest

== Buildings ==
Name and location	Photograph	Date	Notes	Grade
Whitwell Hall Annexe; 54.08414°N 0.900118°W		Early 19th century (probable)	A stable block and chapel later used for other purposes, it is in sandstone and has a Westmorland slate roof with gable coping. There is a U-shaped plan, with the chapel in the centre of the main range. It has two storeys and single-storey extensions to the wings. The main range has seven bays, the middle range projecting slightly, and containing a doorway with a Tudor arch, a divided fanlight and a hood mould. The outer bays are arcaded, and have recesses containing casement windows with triangular fanlights. On the roof is an octagonal bell turret with a cupola, and a sundial flanked by pinnacles.	II
South Lodge; 54.07950°N 0.89938°W	—	1835 (probable)	The lodge to Whitwell Hall is in limestone, with diagonal buttresses, and a Westmorland slate roof with gable coping and kneelers. There is a cruciform plan with an extension at the rear, one storey and three bays. In the centre is a projecting gabled bay with octagonal angle turrets, a five-light straight-headed window, and a blank shield in the gable. To the left is a two-light window, and to the right is a doorway with an elliptical head.	II
Whitwell Hall; 54.08389°N 0.90128°W	—	1835	A country house in limestone, with a floor band, a hipped Westmorland slate roof, and octagonal corner turrets. There are two storeys and attics, and five bays divided by pilaster buttresses. In the centre is a canted bay window with an embattled parapet, and the outer bays have four-light windows with four-centred arched heads. The upper floor contains two- or three-light straight-headed windows, and above is an embattled parapet on decorative corbels, and a central gable with a finial, containing a two-light window. On the right return is a porte-cochère with Tudor arches and an openwork parapet.	II
Railway Signal Box, Kirkham Abbey Station; 54.08225°N 0.88080°W		c. 1856	The signal box was built for the York and North Midland Railway. It is in brick with stone band and a slate roof. On the ground floor are two round-headed windows. There are two storeys, the door on the upper storey is reached by external steps, and there is a balcony on iron brackets on three sides. The windows are large horizontally sliding sashes.	II
St John's Church; 54.08385°N 0.89449°W		1858–60	The church, designed by G. E. Street, is built in sandstone with a tile roof. It consists of a nave, a south porch, and a chancel with a north vestry and a south steeple. The steeple has a tower with two stages, a semicircular stair turret on the west, lancet windows, a south clock face, two-light bell openings with roundels above, and a broach spire with lucarnes. On the west front is a row of four lancet windows, and a rose window above containing roundels.	II*
Milepost; 54.07306°N 0.91574°W		Late 19th century	The milepost on the A64 road is in cast iron, and has a triangular plan and a sloping top. On both sides are pointing hands, the left side has the distance to Malton, and the right side the distance to York.	II
