= St Peter and St Paul's Church, Scrayingham =

Church in North Yorkshire, England

Coordinates: 54.0344°N 0.8824°W

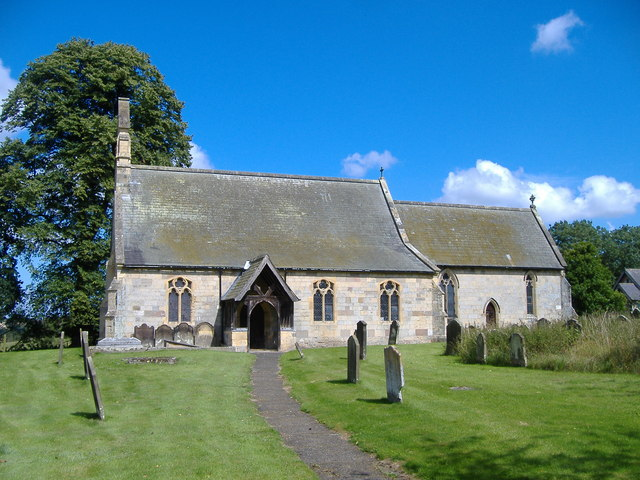
The church, in 2010

St Peter and St Paul's Church is the parish church of Scrayingham, a village in North Yorkshire, in England.

The church was probably built in the 8th century, from which period much of the north and west walls of the nave survive, reusing many Roman stones. It may be the oldest standing building in the former East Riding of Yorkshire. The chancel was rebuilt in the 14th century. The church was restored and partly rebuilt by G. T. Andrews in 1853. The work included widening the nave, building a new south wall, rebuilding all the windows of the chancel, and the addition of a bellcote and vestry. The church was regarded as being almost entirely Victorian until Peter Ryder investigated it in 2009 and recognised the Saxon work. Since 2013, it has been grade II* listed. George Hudson is buried in the churchyard.

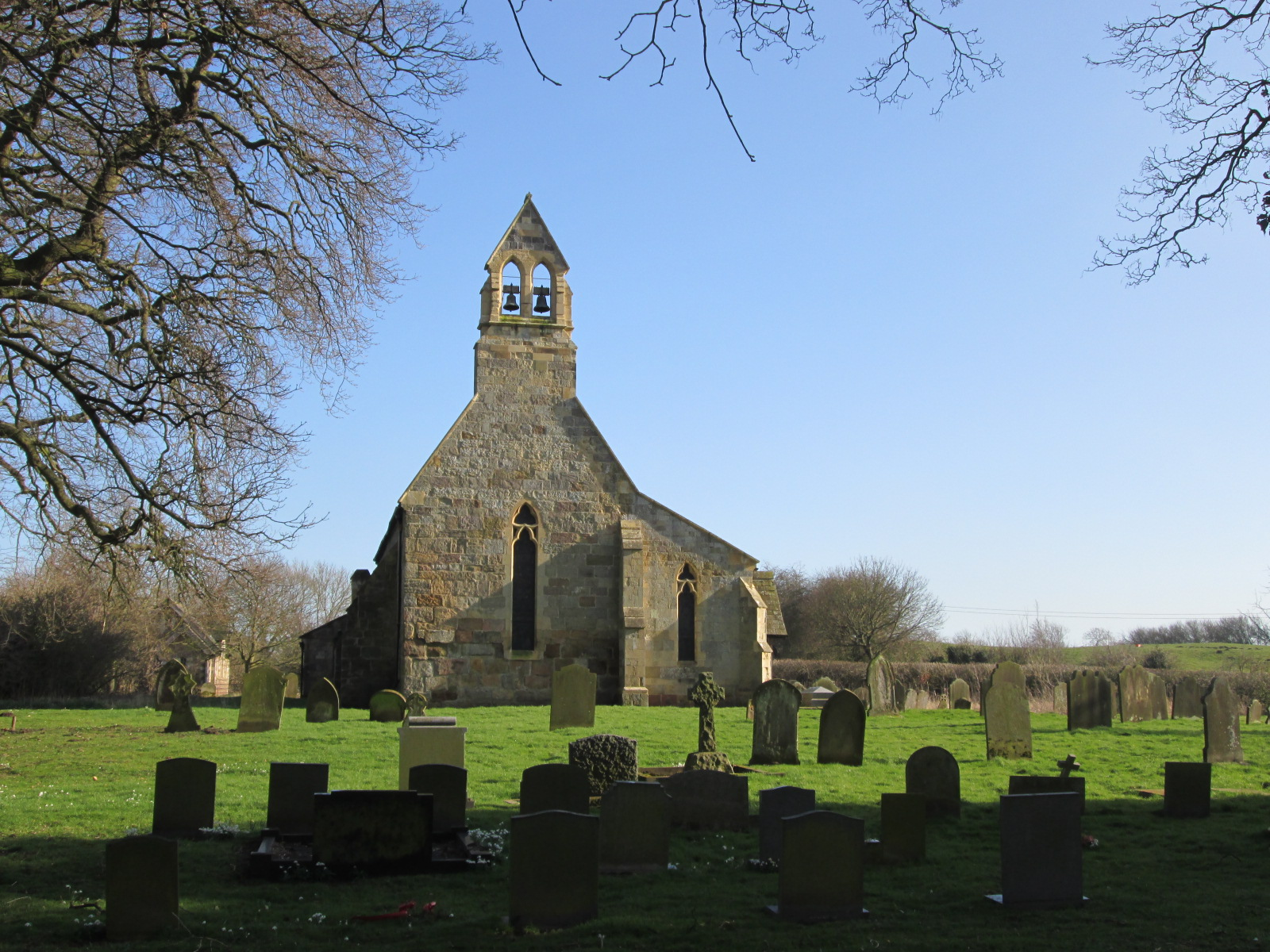
View from the west

The church is built of gritstone and magnesian limestone, with grey slate roofs. It consists of a nave, a south aisle, a chancel and a northeast vestry. On the west gable end is a bellcote. The north wall has two blocked Saxon windows. The east window and one of the lancet windows have glass by Clayton and Bell. Inside, there is a memorial plaque from 1638, a coloured glass chancel screen, and a large brass chandelier designed by John Loughborough Pearson and brought from St Edith's Church, Bishop Wilton. Some fragments of carved Romanesque stone are built into the north wall of the vestry.

== See also ==
- Grade II* listed churches in North Yorkshire (district)
- Listed buildings in Scrayingham
