= Listed buildings in Barton-le-Willows =

Barton-le-Willows is a civil parish in the county of North Yorkshire, England. It contains four listed buildings that are recorded in the National Heritage List for England. All the listed buildings are designated at Grade II, the lowest of the three grades, which is applied to "buildings of national importance and special interest". The parish contains the village of Barton-le-Willows and the surrounding countryside. The listed buildings consist of a former public house, two farmhouses and a private house.

== Buildings ==
Name and location	Photograph	Date	Notes
Prospect Farmhouse; 54.06095°N 0.91135°W		Early 18th century	The farmhouse is in limestone and has a swept pantile roof. There are two storeys and three bays. On the front is a doorway, and the windows are casements.
Former Blacksmiths Arms; 54.06142°N 0.90860°W		Early to mid 18th century	The house of two builds, which was at one time a public house. The earlier part on the left has a single bay, and is in limestone. The other part, dating from the late 18th century, is in brick with two bays, and has a dentilled eaves course. The house has a pantile roof, and there are two storeys. On the front are two doorways and sash windows. At the rear is a parallel range, an outshut, and a stable block with external steps.
Manor Farmhouse; 54.06118°N 0.91211°W		Late 18th century	The farmhouse is in sandstone, with limestone quoins, a dentilled eaves course, and a pantile roof with gable coping and shaped kneelers. There are two storeys, four bays, a single-storey L-shaped extension to the left, and rear outshuts. On the front is a gabled porch and sash windows, those in the ground floor with channelled lintels.
Barton Moor House; 54.06410°N 0.92954°W		Early 19th century	The house is in brick, and has a pantile roof with gable coping and shaped kneelers. There are two storeys and three bays. The central doorway has a divided fanlight, the windows are sashes, and the openings have cambered brick arches.
