= Raincliffe School =

School in Scarborough, England

Coordinates: 54.284°N 0.441°W

Raincliffe School was a comprehensive secondary school, with Business and Enterprise College status, in Scarborough, North Yorkshire, England. On 31 August 2012, Raincliffe School formally closed, entering a federation with nearby Graham School.

For many years the school held an annual fell run, called the Muddy Rut, in which the entire student roll would race through Raincliffe Woods.

On 23 June 2017, the Raincliffe school site (Graham lower school) closed due to falling pupil numbers.

== Notable alumni ==
- John Fendley, aka Fenners – TV presenter, mostly known for hosting Soccer AM
- Robert Horwell – played Nick Neeson in Coronation Street
- Sophia Wardman – singer, part of the group Belle Amie; appeared on Shipwrecked TV reality show
- Sir Gavin Williamson – MP, was Secretary of State for Defence from November 2017 until May 2019. He was subsequently Secretary of State for Education from July 2019 until September 2021.
