= Howsham railway station (North Yorkshire) =

Disused railway station in North Yorkshire, England

Howsham
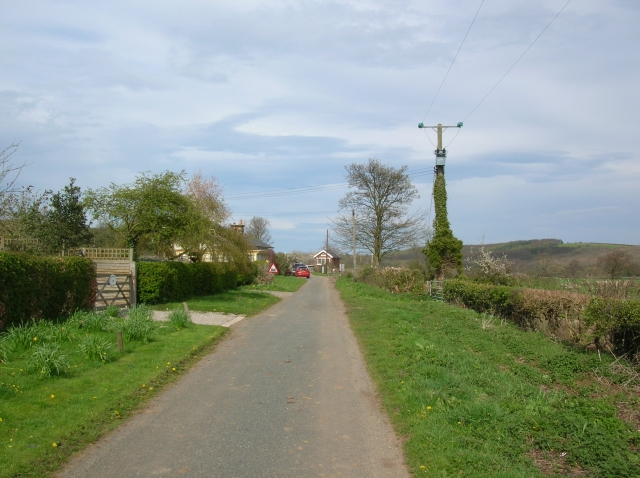
- Approach to Howsham level crossing with the area of the former station to the left

General information
- Location: Howsham and Crambe, North Yorkshire; England
- Coordinates: 54.065667°N 0.878400°W
- Grid reference: SE735638
- Platforms: 2

Other information
- Status: Disused

History
- Pre-grouping: York and North Midland Railway

Key dates
- 5 July 1845: opened
- 1849: closed
Location

Howsham railway station was a short-lived railway station between the villages of Howsham and Crambe in North Yorkshire, England. Located on the York to Scarborough Line (where the level-crossing now is). It was opened on 5 July 1845 by the York and North Midland Railway and closed in 1849.

It is shown as "Crambe station" on Moule's 1850s maps of North and East Yorkshire, and as Crambe Beck Station in John Philips's Geology of Yorkshire.

Preceding station	Historical railways	Following station
Barton Hill; Station closed; Line open	Y&NMR; York to Scarborough Line	Kirkham Abbey; Station closed; Line open
