= Whitwell Hall =

Historic building in North Yorkshire, England

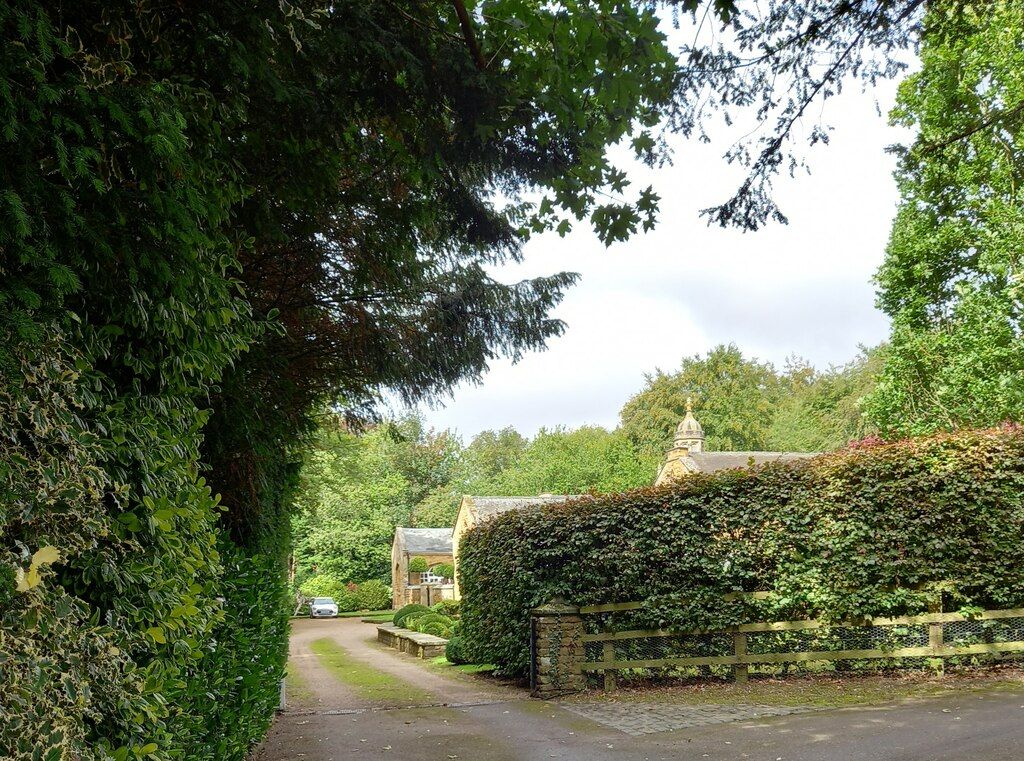
- Buildings at Whitwell Hall; the roof of the annexe is visible

- Location within North Yorkshire

General information
- Type: Country house
- Architectural style: Tudor
- Location: Main Street, Whitwell-on-the-Hill, North Yorkshire, England
- Coordinates: 54°05′02″N 0°54′04″W
- Year built: 1835
- Client: Joseph Haigh

Design and construction
- Architects: James Pigott Pritchett and Charles Watson

Listed Building – Grade II
- Official name: Whitwell Hall
- Designated: 29 November 1976
- Reference no.: 1174893

Listed Building – Grade II
- Official name: Whitwell Hall annexe
- Designated: 25 January 1954
- Reference no.: 1174899

Whitwell Hall is a historic building on Main Street in Whitwell-on-the-Hill, a village in North Yorkshire, England.

The country house was built in 1835, for Joseph Haigh. It was designed by James Pigott Pritchett and Charles Watson, in the Tudor style, with construction costing £30,000. The stable block was built at a similar time, but incorporates a chapel, which may contain remnants of a 15th-century building. The house and stables were later converted into a hotel, then back into housing. The house and stable block are separately Grade II listed.

The house is built of limestone, with a floor band, a hipped Westmorland slate roof, and octagonal corner turrets. It has two storeys and attics, and five bays divided by pilaster buttresses. In the centre is a canted bay window with an embattled parapet, and the outer bays have four-light windows with four-centred arched heads. The upper floor contains two- or three-light straight-headed windows, and above is an embattled parapet on decorative corbels, and a central gable with a finial, containing a two-light window. On the right return is a porte-cochère with Tudor arches and an openwork parapet.

The stable block is built of sandstone and has a Westmorland slate roof with gable coping. It has a U-shaped plan, with the chapel in the centre of the main range. It has two storeys and single-storey extensions to the wings. The main range has seven bays, the middle range projecting slightly, and containing a doorway with a Tudor arch, a divided fanlight and a hood mould. The outer bays are arcaded, and have recesses containing casement windows with triangular fanlights. On the roof is an octagonal bell turret with a cupola, and a sundial flanked by pinnacles.

== See also ==
- Listed buildings in Whitwell-on-the-Hill
