= River Hertford =

River in North Yorkshire, England

Coordinates: 54°11′49″N 0°29′54″W

Hertford
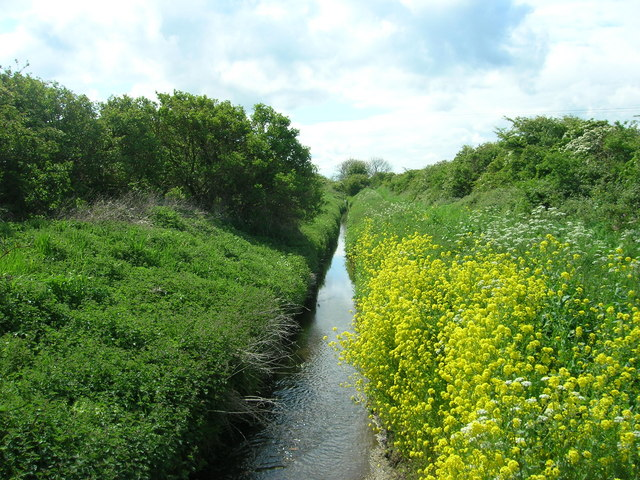
- River Hertford, looking west

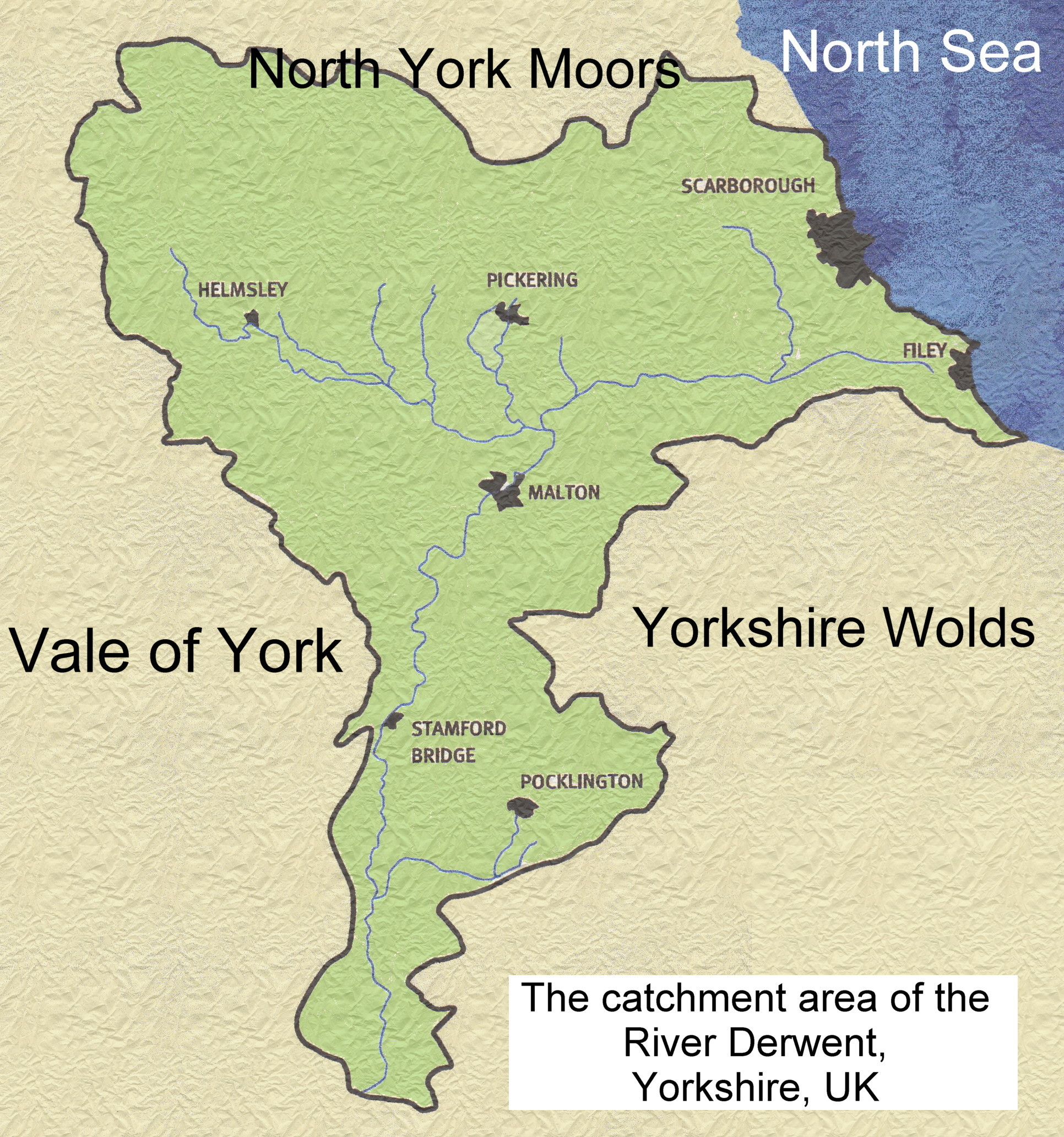
- Map of the Catchment Area of the River Derwent

Location
- Country: England
- Region: Yorkshire

Physical characteristics
- Source
  - location: Muston, North Yorkshire, England
- Mouth: Haybridge
  - location: River Derwent, North Yorkshire, England
- Length: 16 km (9.9 mi)
- Basin size: 45.22 km^{2} (17.46 sq mi)

The River Hertford is a river in Yorkshire in the north of England. It is part of the River Derwent catchment area. The River Hertford starts close to Muston near the seaside town of Filey. Despite being only 1.2 miles (2 km) from the North Sea (to its eastern side) the river flows westwards for 9.9 miles (16 km) into the River Derwent at Haybridge, North Yorkshire, near Wykeham. It has been referred to as a 'backward-flowing river' because it flows away from the sea. Ekwall suggests the name derives from a ford over the river, which became the name by back formation.

Star Carr, a Mesolithic archaeological site, lies close to the river. Star Carr was on the edge of a lake known as Lake Flixton. This area is now known as the River Hertford Floodplain and extends from Muston in the east to Ganton in the west.

Originally the river meandered, but the Muston & Yedingham Drainage Act 1800 resulted in the River Derwent and the River Hertford being straightened by cutting a new course for each. The Hertford was hand dug during the industrial revolution (local stories hold that the men who dug the new channel were prisoners from the Napoleonic Wars).

The River Hertford catchment suffers from the discharges of three sewage plants at Folkton, Hunmanby and Seamer. This not only affects the quality of the river but also that of the Derwent downstream of Haybridge.
