= Listed buildings in Crambe, North Yorkshire =

Crambe is a civil parish in the county of North Yorkshire, England. It contains five listed buildings that are recorded in the National Heritage List for England. Of these, one is listed at Grade I, the highest of the three grades, and the others are at Grade II, the lowest grade. The parish contains the village of Crambe and the surrounding countryside, and the listed buildings consist of a church, two farmhouses, a former schoolroom and a telephone kiosk.

== Key ==
Grade	Criteria
I	Buildings of exceptional interest, sometimes considered to be internationally important
II	Buildings of national importance and special interest

== Buildings ==
Name and location	Photograph	Date	Notes	Grade
St Michael's Church; 54.07446°N 0.88077°W		11th century	The church has been altered and extended through the centuries, the tower dates from the 15th century, and the church was restored in 1887. The nave and chancel are built in sandstone and gritstone incorporating re-used Roman masonry, and the tower is in limestone. The church consists of a two-bay nave, a single-bay chancel and a west tower. The tower has three stages, string courses, diagonal buttresses, a round-headed west doorway with a moulded surround and a hood mould, above which is a five-light Perpendicular window. The bell openings have two round-arched heads, and above is an embattled parapet with eight crocketed pinnacles, and an inscription on the north face.	I
Pond Farmhouse; 54.07303°N 0.88131°W	—	Early 17th century	A cruck-framed house, encased in sandstone, with a thatched roof covered in corrugated iron. There is a single storey and attics, and four bays. On the front is a doorway, and the windows are horizontally-sliding sashes, those in the attics in dormers. Inside, there are two surviving cruck trusses.	II
Oakcliffe Farmhouse; 54.07441°N 0.86917°W		Late 18th century	The farmhouse is in limestone, and has a swept pantile roof with gable coping and shaped kneelers. There are two storeys and three bays. The doorway is in the centre, above it is a casement window, and the outer bays contain horizontally-sliding sash windows.	II
The School Room; 54.07457°N 0.88191°W		1841	The former schoolroom is in limestone with brick dressings and a pantile roof. There is a single storey and three bays. In the centre is a doorway, above it is an inscribed and dated plaque, and flanking it are three-light casement windows. All the openings have segmental-arched brick lintels.	II
Telephone kiosk 54.07459°N 0.88173°W		1935	The K6 type telephone kiosk in Town Green was designed by Giles Gilbert Scott. Constructed in cast iron with a square plan and a dome, it has three unperforated crowns in the top panels.	II
