= Howsham Mill =

Listed watermill in North Yorkshire, England

Coordinates: 54.0560°N 0.8862°W

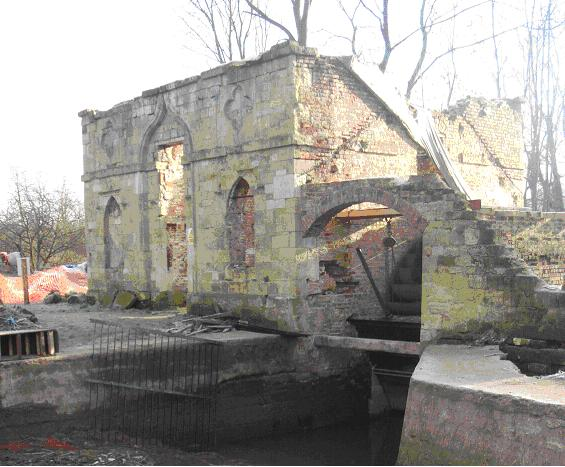
Howsham Mill in 2007, before restoration

Howsham Mill is a Grade II listed 18th century watermill located on the River Derwent in North Yorkshire, England.

== History ==
Howsham Mill dates back to c. 1755 and is attributed to John Carr of York. It was built in the Gothic Revival style both as a working grist mill to grind grains into flour and as an eyecatcher or folly within the formal parkscape of nearby Howsham Hall.

The mill was powered by a breastshot waterwheel connected by a gear wheel to millstones that grind the grain into flour.

Milling of flour ceased in 1947 and the building fell into decay by the 1960s.

Howsham Mill has been listed since 1966.

== Restoration ==
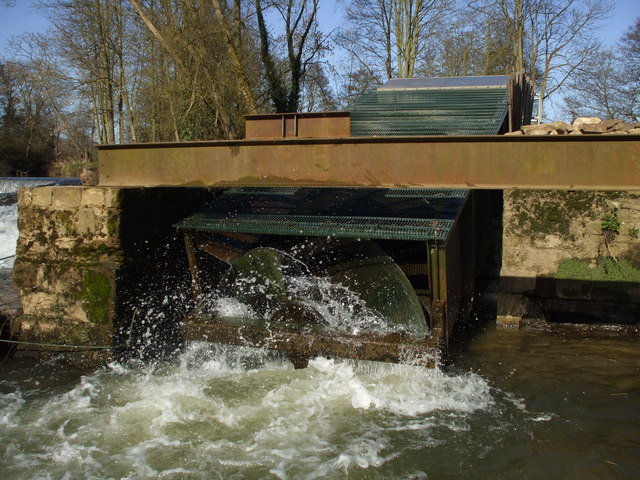
New screw turbine

In 2004 the Renewable Heritage Trust was formed by local residents with the intention of preserving and restoring the mill.

Fund raising, volunteer labour and grant funding, totalling £450,000 has enabled the installation of a new waterwheel and a screw turbine based on the Archimedean screw principle to generate electricity and help fund the project in the long term.

The first phase of the restoration was completed in 2007 and involved installing the new waterwheel and Archimedean screw as well as rebuilding the walls and roof of the granary to the north of the main building, allowing the installation of a kitchen and toilets as well as housing the control equipment for the hydro generation.

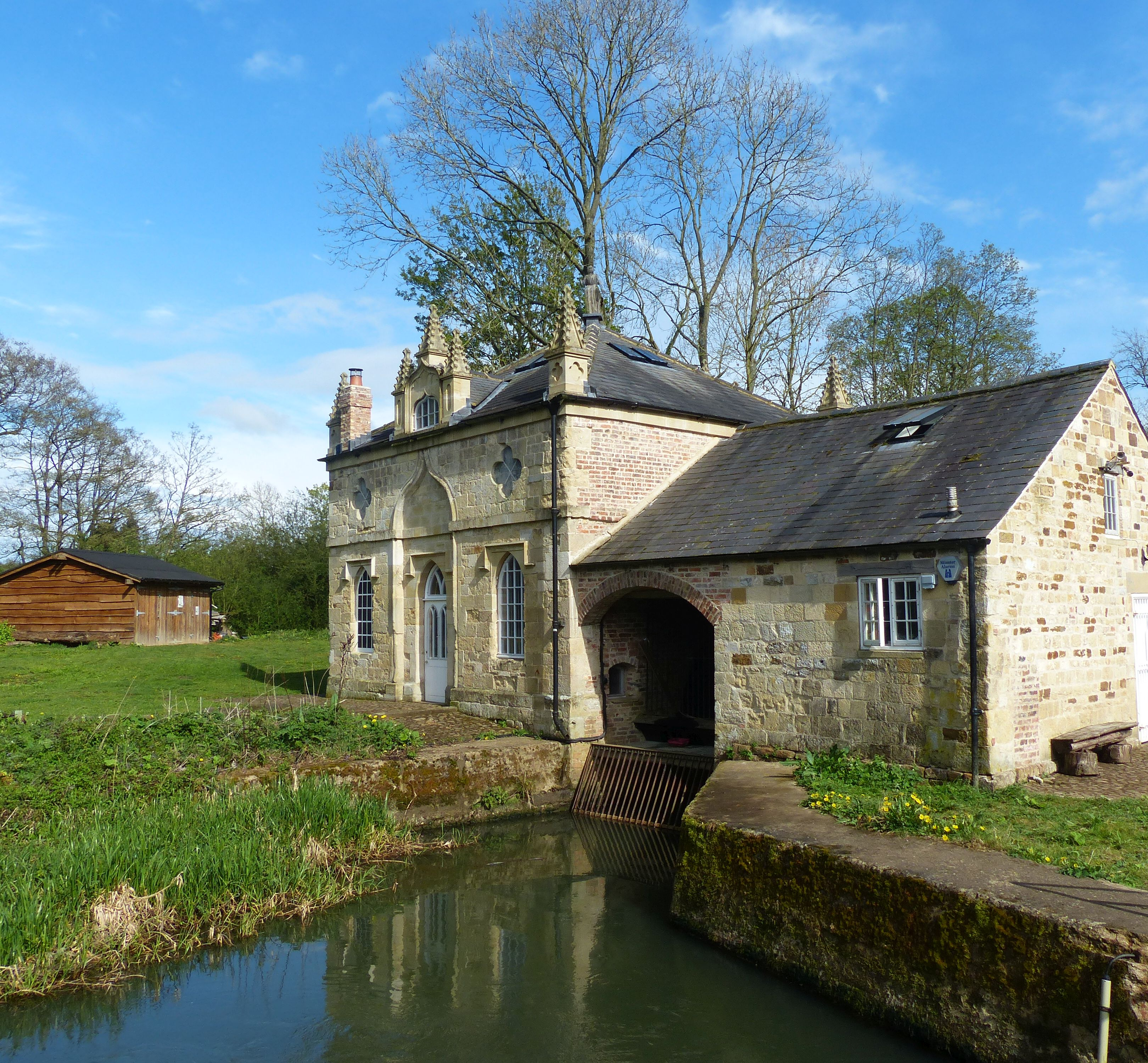
Howsham Mill in 2019

The Mill was connected to the National Grid in 2010, allowing electricity generated to be sold. Restoration of the main part of the building was completed in 2013 providing facilities as an environmental study/community centre. A second, larger screw was commissioned in 2018 to provide additional hydro-electric generating capacity.

== Restoration Village ==
In 2006 Howsham Mill was featured on the BBC television programme Restoration Village presented by Griff Rhys Jones. It won the North regional heat and was featured in the live National Final on Sunday 17 September 2006. Although Howsham Mill did not win, a £50,000 Project Planning grant was won by reaching the final.

== See also ==
- Listed buildings in Howsham, North Yorkshire
