= Leppington, North Yorkshire =

Hamlet in North Yorkshire, England

Coordinates: 54.0398°N 0.83575°W

Leppington
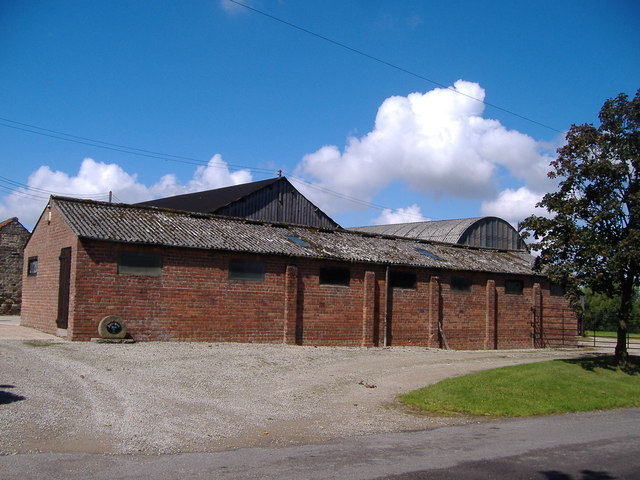
- Poplar House Farm

- Location within North Yorkshire
- OS grid reference: SE763610
  - London: 175 mi (282 km) S
- Civil parish: Scrayingham
- Unitary authority: North Yorkshire
- Ceremonial county: North Yorkshire
- Region: Yorkshire and the Humber
- Country: England
- Sovereign state: United Kingdom
- Post town: MALTON
- Postcode district: YO17
- Police: North Yorkshire
- Fire: North Yorkshire
- Ambulance: Yorkshire
- UK Parliament: Thirsk and Malton

Leppington is a hamlet and former civil parish, now in the parish of Scrayingham, in North Yorkshire, England, and is 12 miles (19 km) north-east from the centre of the city and county town of York. In 1931 the parish had a population of 74.

The nearest railway station is at Malton, 7 miles (11 km) to the north.

At the north of Leppington is the Grade II listed 17th-century Leppington Grange Barn.

== History ==
The name Leppington derives from the Old English Leppaingtūn meaning 'settlement connected with Leppa'.

Historically the hamlet was part of the East Riding of Yorkshire until 1974. Leppington in 1823 was in the Wapentake of Buckrose in the East Riding of Yorkshire.

Leppington was formerly a township and chapelry in the parish of Scrayingham, from 1866 Leppington was a civil parish in its own right, on 1 April 1935 the parish was abolished and merged with Scrayingham. From 1974 to 2023 it was part of the district of Ryedale, it is now administered by the unitary North Yorkshire Council.
