= Whitwell-on-the-Hill =

Village and civil parish in North Yorkshire, England

Coordinates: 54°05′00″N 0°53′47″W

Whitewell-on-the-Hill
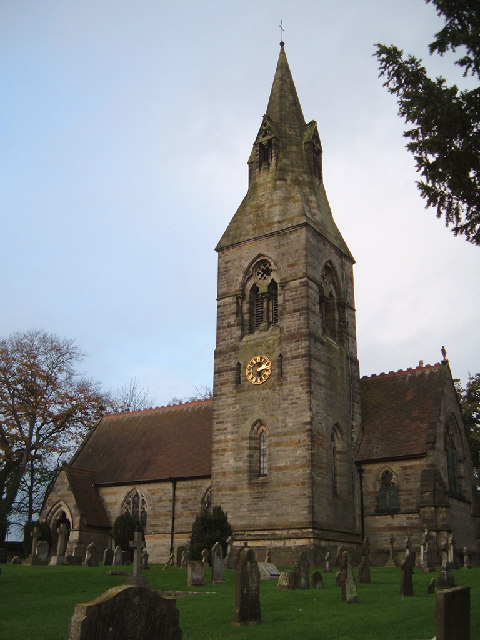
- St John's Church, Whitwell-on-the-Hill

- Location within North Yorkshire
- Population: 311 (2011 census)
- Unitary authority: North Yorkshire
- Ceremonial county: North Yorkshire
- Region: Yorkshire and the Humber
- Country: England
- Sovereign state: United Kingdom
- Post town: York
- Postcode district: YO60
- Police: North Yorkshire
- Fire: North Yorkshire
- Ambulance: Yorkshire
- UK Parliament: Thirsk and Malton

Whitwell-on-the-Hill is a village and civil parish in the county of North Yorkshire, England. The civil parish population (including Crambe and Foston) at the 2011 Census was 311. It is near the A64 road.

It was part of the Ryedale district between 1974 and 2023. It is now administered by North Yorkshire Council.

St John's Church, Whitwell-on-the-Hill, is the Anglican parish church.

Langdale's 1822 Topographical Dictionary reports "a well of remarkably clear water, from which the town derives its name". The 1828 The New Yorkshire Gazetteer or Topographical Dictionary by Stephen Reynolds Clarke states that Whitwell is "6 miles S.W. from Malton [has] a singular well, the water of which is nearly the colour of milk, and from which the township derives its name."

== See also ==
- Listed buildings in Whitwell-on-the-Hill
- Whitwell Hall, designed by James Pigott Pritchard, 1831, for Joseph Haigh (York Historian 40:36).
