= Barton Hill railway station =

Disused railway station in North Yorkshire, England

Barton Hill
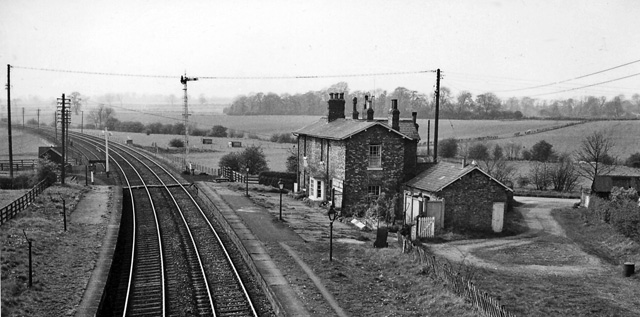
- Barton Hill railway station in 1961

General information
- Location: Barton Hill, North Yorkshire; England
- Coordinates: 54.069959°N 0.919590°W
- Grid reference: SE708643
- Platforms: 2

Other information
- Status: Disused

History
- Original company: York and North Midland Railway
- Pre-grouping: North Eastern Railway
- Post-grouping: London and North Eastern Railway

Key dates
- 5 July 1845: opened
- 22 September 1930: closed for passengers
- 10 August 1964: closed for goods traffic
Location

Barton Hill railway station was a minor railway station serving the villages of Barton Hill and Barton-le-Willows in North Yorkshire, England. Located on the York to Scarborough Line it was opened on 5 July 1845 by the York and North Midland Railway. It closed to passengers on 22 September 1930, but remained open for goods traffic until 10 August 1964.

The level crossing originally carried the York to Scarborough road (later the A64), but this was diverted onto a bridge over the railway in the 1930s.

The station was originally just named Barton, but the 'Hill' suffix was added in July 1853.

Preceding station	Historical railways	Following station
Flaxton; Station closed; Line open	Y&NMR; York to Scarborough Line	Howsham; Station closed; Line open
