= Barton-le-Willows =

Village and civil parish in North Yorkshire, England

Coordinates: 54°03′39″N 0°54′35″W

- Location within North Yorkshire
- Population: 284 (2011 census)
- OS grid reference: SE714633
- Civil parish: Barton-le-Willows
- Unitary authority: North Yorkshire
- Ceremonial county: North Yorkshire
- Region: Yorkshire and the Humber
- Country: England
- Sovereign state: United Kingdom
- Post town: YORK
- Postcode district: YO60
- Police: North Yorkshire
- Fire: North Yorkshire
- Ambulance: Yorkshire
- UK Parliament: Thirsk and Malton

Barton-le-Willows is a village and civil parish in North Yorkshire, England, situated near the River Derwent, about eight miles south-west of Malton. The parish had a population (including Harton) of 186 according to the 2001 census increasing to 284 at the 2011 Census. The village is recorded as Bartun in the Domesday Book.

The name Barton derives from the Old English beretūn meaning 'settlement where barley is grown'.

The house in the picture is No. 5 Forge cottage the old blacksmiths. Woodpeckers visit the garden every day, house martins nest under the eaves and kingfishers live down by the river.

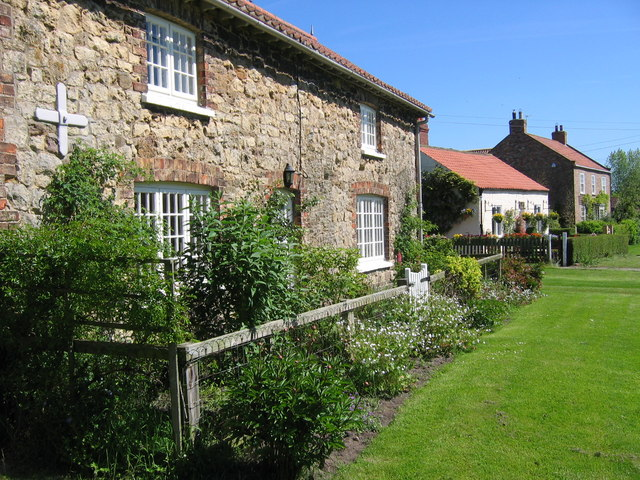
Barton-le-Willows

The Village Hall in Barton Le Willows is a registered charity, and in its constitution is there to serve the villages of Barton Le Willows, Barton Hill, Bossall, Crambe, Harton and Howsham. An active community hub, villagers enjoy, amongst other things, a regular Parent and Toddler group, Pop up Pub, Cinema, Yoga classes, Knit and Natter, and an annual Himalayan Balsam Weed Pull, Easter Egg Hunt and Apple Pressing.

Barton-le-Willows was served by Barton Hill railway station on the York to Scarborough Line between 1845 and 1930.

The village was part of the Ryedale district between 1974 and 2023. It is now administered by the unitary North Yorkshire Council.

== See also ==
- Listed buildings in Barton-le-Willows
