= Howsham Hall =

Grade I listed Jacobean country house in North Yorkshire, England

Coordinates: 54.05916°N 0.88006°W

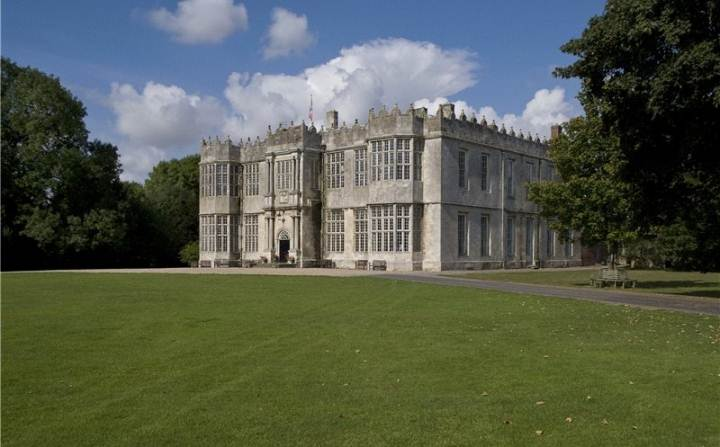

Howsham Hall is a 28,336 square feet (2,632.5 m^{2}) grade I listed Jacobean stately home in Howsham, North Yorkshire, England.

It is built in two storeys of limestone ashlar to a U-shaped plan with a 7-bay frontage.

== History ==
In the early 16th century the Howsham estate belonged to nearby Kirkham Priory and following the dissolution of the monasteries under Henry VIII was granted to Thomas Manners, 1st Earl of Rutland around 1540. His great-grandson sold it to Thomas Bamburgh. The present Hall was built in about 1610 on the site of a previous manor house, using stone from the priory, by Sir William Bamburgh, whose coat of arms, with those of his wife Mary Forthe, is above the main entrance. The cellar is Norman and the main part of the house is Jacobean. However the structure of the building has since been altered over the years. Sir William was High Sheriff of Yorkshire in 1607–08.

In 1709, the house having passed by marriage to the Wentworth family, Sir John Wentworth added the east front.

Having passed again by marriage to the Cholmeley family of Whitby Abbey, the house was remodelled in about 1775 for Nathaniel Cholmley, possibly by John Carr or Peter Atkinson. There is a Georgian brick extension at the back of the house and some of the windows have been altered so they have larger panes in the Georgian style. The parkland was laid out by Capability Brown in the 1770s for the Cholmeley family. In the grounds are three Giant Sequoia trees arranged in a triangle. These were given to a limited number of country estates in the seventeenth century. Sequoias were unknown to European horticulture till the middle of the 19th century, post the California goldrush.

The estate passed to the Strickland family who sold the estate and its contents in 1948. In the 1950s, it was bought and converted into a boy's preparatory school.

== Howsham Hall School ==
Howsham Hall School
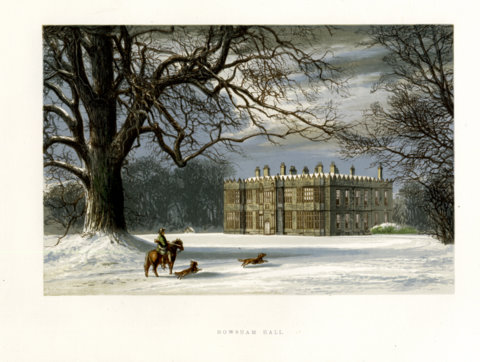
- Engraving of Howsham Hall

Information
- Type: Preparatory school
- Motto: Potentes Virtute ("Strength in Courage")
- Established: 1958
- Closed: 2007
- Gender: Coeducational

Howsham Hall was bought in 1956 by John Knock. It had been due to be demolished by the council, but in 1958 it opened as an independent boys' school. In 1993 the school introduced both girls and day pupils increasing school numbers to around 60. The school was closed on 6 July 2007 at the end of the Summer Term due to dwindling pupil numbers.

=== The School ===
The subjects that the school taught were French, Maths, English, Latin, Poetry, History, Debating, Singing, R.E., Ancient History, Hand Writing, Art, Geography, I.T. and Science. Drama was also offered to pupils up until year 7. The school also offered music lessons. The total number of pupils was approximately 60 which meant that each year had around 10 pupils in each year group. This meant that class sizes were small as well. Howsham Hall was a Roman Catholic school and had a morning and evening service every weekday and mass on Sunday. In the Autumn and Spring terms boys played rugby, with the school fielding a 1st XV and an U11s team; while the girls had ballet, aerobics or needlework classes. Pupils also did cross country on Mondays and Thursdays culminating in a 7-mile run at the end of the spring term called the "championship" an inter house competition. In the summer term boys did cricket with the school fielding 2 teams senior and junior and the girls did rounders. Horse riding was also offered on Tuesday afternoons and Swimming was done up until year 7 (Form 2) on Friday morning at Pickering. The school also offered occasional canoeing, shooting and sailing.

=== Allegations of abuse ===
In 1998 allegations of abuse were brought against the school by a former pupil. The allegations included the beating of pupils with straps, pupils being made to stand in cold baths for hours, public humiliation of bed-wetters and censorship of letters home, however none of these allegations were proven and were subsequently dropped despite numerous testimonials from other former pupils.

=== School closure and sale ===
The school announced its closure in 2007 and the building was sold to a private investor who returned the building to a single private home. The house was put up for sale in 2009

== Wedding venue ==
In 2017 Events company Dine started to operate Howsham Hall as a wedding and events venue. The hall offers exclusive hire for weddings, parties and retreats.

== See also ==
- Grade I listed buildings in North Yorkshire (district)
- Listed buildings in Howsham, North Yorkshire
