= Bamburgh baronets =

Extinct baronetcy in the Baronetage of England

The Bamburgh Baronetcy, of Howsham in the County of York, was a title in the Baronetage of England. It was created on 1 December 1619 for William Bamburgh, High Sheriff of Yorkshire from 1607 to 1608. The title became extinct on the early death of his younger son, the third Baronet, in 1631.

== Bamburgh baronets, of Howsham (1619) ==
- Sir William Bamburgh, 1st Baronet (died 1623)
- Sir Thomas Bamburgh, 2nd Baronet (1607–1624)
- Sir John Bamburgh, 3rd Baronet (1613–1631)
