= St Michael's Church, Crambe =

Church in North Yorkshire, England

Coordinates: 54°04′28″N 0°52′51″W

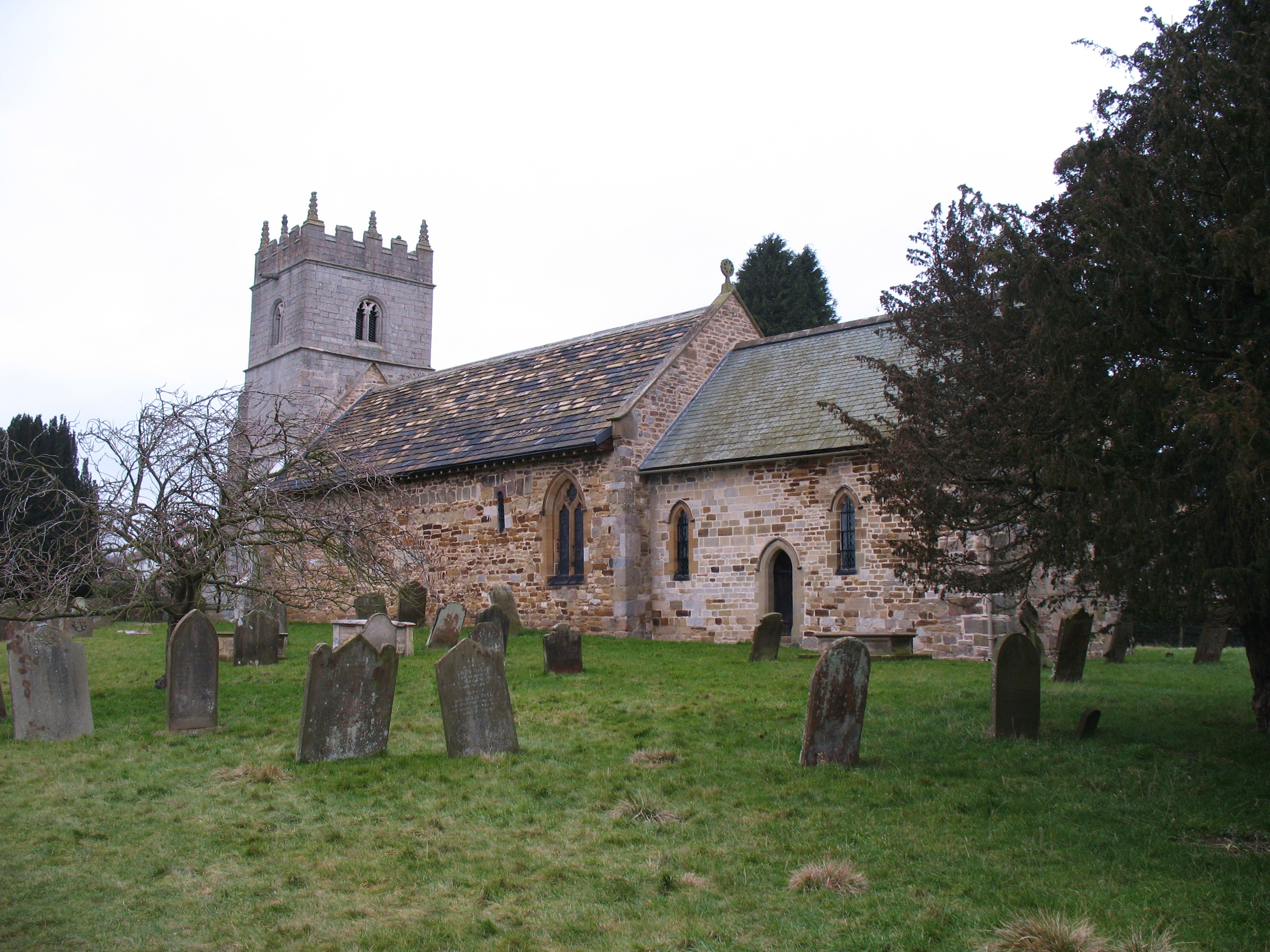
The church, in 2012

St Michael's Church is the parish church of Crambe, North Yorkshire, a village in England.

The earliest parts of the current church date from the late 11th century, and consist of part of the north and south walls of the nave, along with the chancel arch. The chancel was rebuilt in the 12th century, and in the 13th century, the nave was lengthened to the west by about 17 feet (5.2 m). In the 14th century, the angle between the chancel and nave was reconstructed, with two windows inserted. In the 15th century, a tower was added at the west end, and the west wall was rebuilt, with buttresses added. The church was restored in 1886 and 1887, with a new east window installed. The building was Grade I listed in 1954.

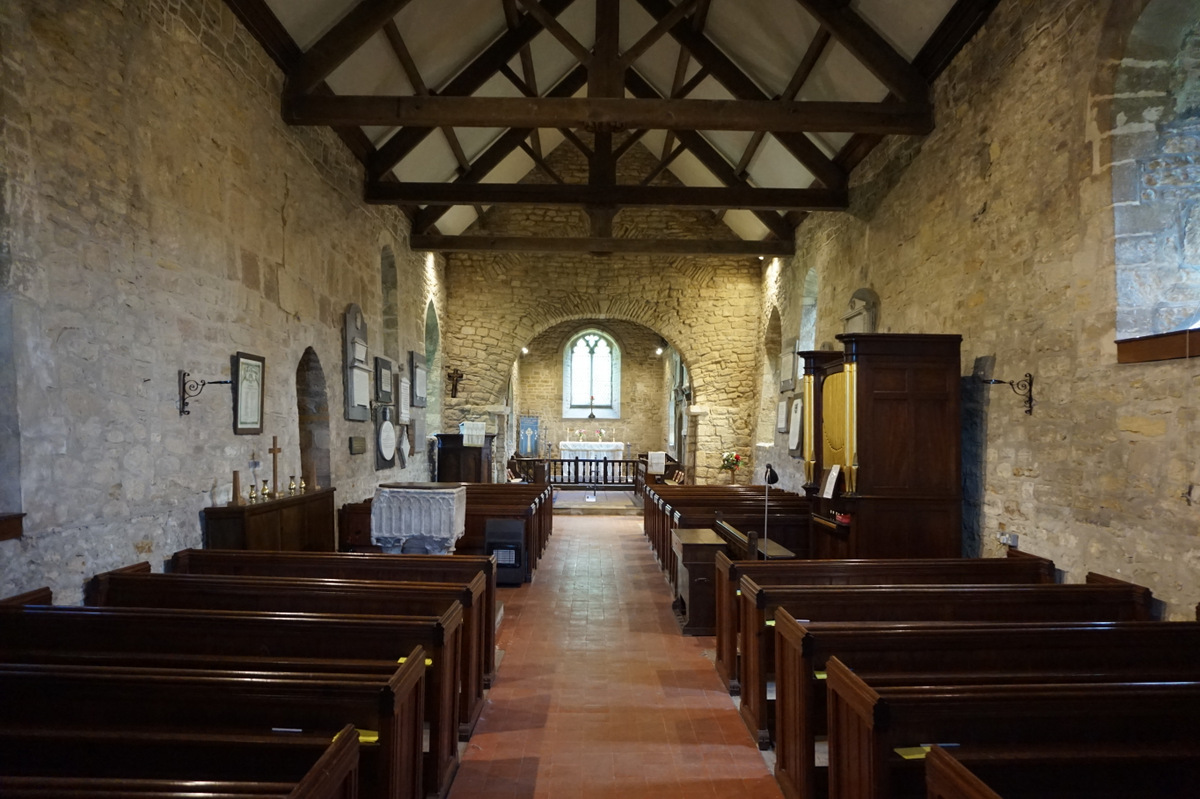
View from the nave into the chancel

The nave and chancel are built in sandstone and gritstone incorporating re-used Roman masonry, and the tower is in limestone. The church consists of a two-bay nave, a single-bay chancel and a west tower. The tower has three stages, string courses, diagonal buttresses, a round-headed west doorway with a moulded surround and a hood mould, above which is a five-light Perpendicular window. The bell openings have two round-arched heads, and above is an embattled parapet with eight crocketed pinnacles, and an inscription on the north face.

Inside the church is a 12th-century font. The octagonal pulpit dates from the early 17th century, as do the altar rails. There is a fragment of a 10th-century hogback built into the south wall.

== See also ==
- Grade I listed buildings in North Yorkshire (district)
- Listed buildings in Crambe, North Yorkshire
