= Scrayingham =

Village and civil parish in North Yorkshire, England

Coordinates: 54.031444°N 0.88522°W

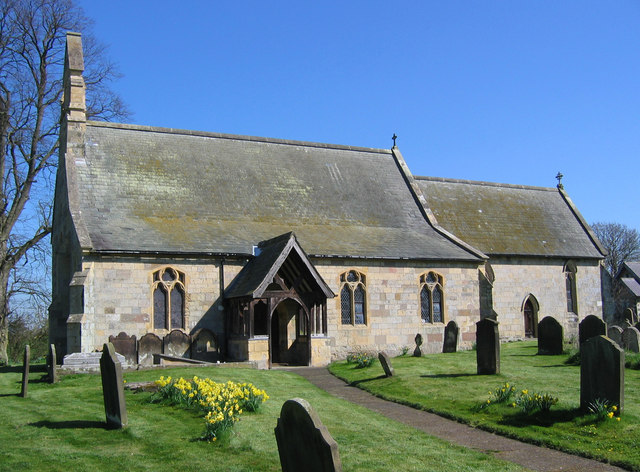
- St Peter & St Paul

- Location within North Yorkshire
  - London: 175 mi (282 km) S
- Unitary authority: North Yorkshire
- Ceremonial county: North Yorkshire
- Region: Yorkshire and the Humber
- Country: England
- Sovereign state: United Kingdom
- Post town: York
- Postcode district: YO41
- Police: North Yorkshire
- Fire: North Yorkshire
- Ambulance: Yorkshire
- UK Parliament: Thirsk and Malton

Scrayingham is a village and civil parish in North Yorkshire, England. The population was less than 100 at the 2011 census. Details are included in the civil parish of Howsham, North Yorkshire. The village is situated approximately 9 miles (14 km) north-east from the centre of the city and county town of York. It was historically part of the East Riding of Yorkshire until 1974 and part of the Ryedale district from 1974 to 2023. It is now administered by the unitary North Yorkshire Council.

The name Scarayingham possibly derives from the Old English Scirheahingashām meaning 'village of Scirheah's people'. Alternatively, the first element may be derived from the Old Norse personal name Skrati. Another theory suggests that it derives from Scraeginghām, meaning 'village at a place called Scraeging'.

Scrayingham is significant for being the parish where George Hudson was born and buried. Today the area has a horse riding school, a few small businesses and a mixture of modern stone cottages built in the Georgian style, and traditional preserved cottages from earlier times. It also has a post office.

The hamlet of Leppington, 2 miles (3.2 km) to the north-east, forms part of the parish.

In 1823 Scrayingham was a civil parish in the Wapentake of Buckrose and the East Riding of Yorkshire. The living for the ecclesiastical parish and the parish church of St Peter's was under the patronage of the King. Population at the time was 157, with occupations including nine farmers, two tailors, a cooper, and the landlord of The Horse & Jockey public house. Resident in the parish was a schoolmaster, the parish curate, and a yeoman.

== See also ==
- Listed buildings in Scrayingham
