= River Derwent, Yorkshire =

River in Yorkshire, England

Derwent Darwent – archaically
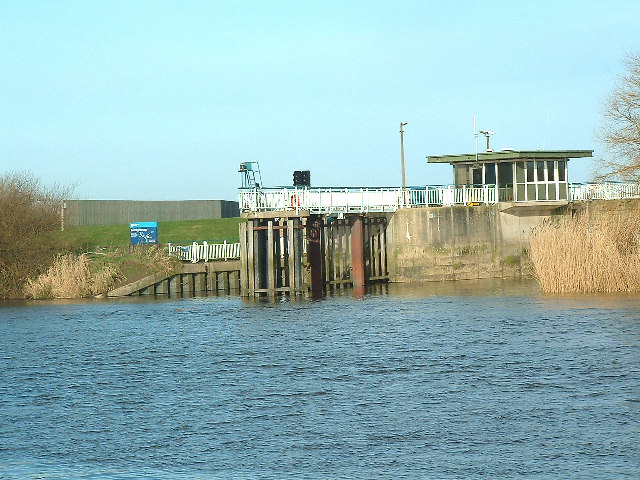
- Barmby on the Marsh Tidal Barrage at the mouth of the River Derwent

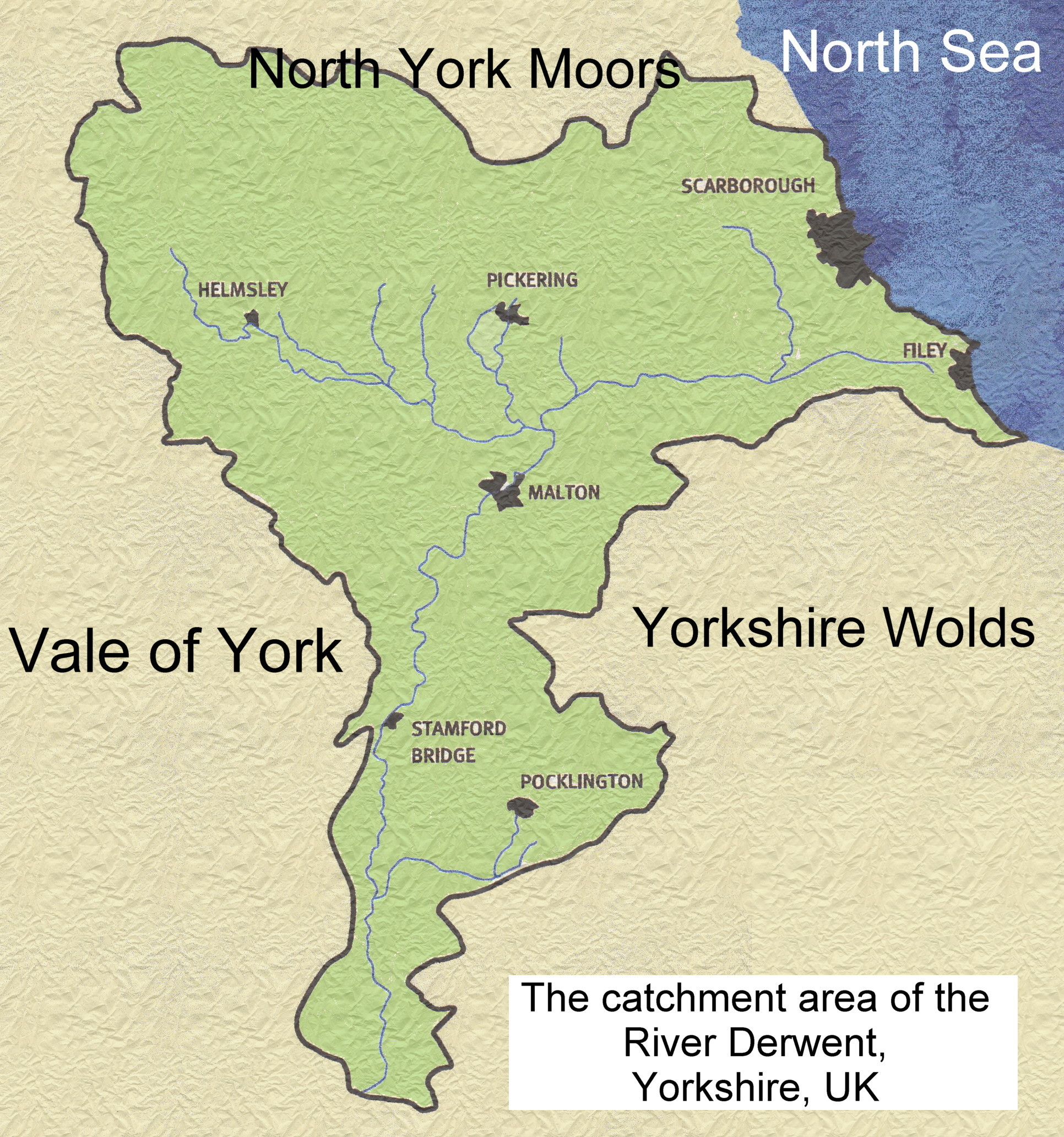
- Map of the Catchment Area of the River Derwent

Location
- Country: England
- Region: Yorkshire

Physical characteristics
- Source: Fylingdales Moor
  - location: North York Moors, Yorkshire, England
  - coordinates: 54°22′50.10″N 0°37′23.79″W
  - elevation: 260 m (850 ft)
- Mouth: Barmby Barrage
  - location: Barmby on the Marsh, Yorkshire, England
  - coordinates: 53°44′58″N 0°58′08″W
  - elevation: 10 m (33 ft)
- Length: 115.1 km (71.5 mi)
- Basin size: 2,057 km^{2} (794 sq mi)

Basin features
- Tributaries
  - left: River Rye, Yorkshire
  - right: Pocklington Canal, River Hertford
- Designation

Ramsar Wetland
- Official name: Lower Derwent Valley
- Designated: 17 July 1985
- Reference no.: 301

The Derwent is a river in Yorkshire in the north of England. It flows from Fylingdales Moor in the North York Moors National Park, east then southwards as far as its confluence with the River Hertford then westwards through the Vale of Pickering, south through Kirkham Gorge and the Vale of York, joining the River Ouse at Barmby on the Marsh. The confluence is unusual in that the Derwent converges on the Ouse at a shallow angle in an upstream direction.

The river used to flow further east, its old course entering the Ouse east of Howden.

The River Derwent catchment area includes the Upper Derwent, River Rye, River Hertford, Bielby Beck and Pocklington Canal and their tributaries. It covers an area of 2,057 square kilometres and includes the towns of Stamford Bridge, Malton, Pickering, Helmsley, Filey and Scarborough. The area is bounded by the Cleveland Hills, North York Moors and Hambleton Hills to the north, the Yorkshire Wolds and the coast to the east, the Vale of York to the west and the River Ouse and Humber Estuary to the south. The area around the river is primarily rural in nature with grazing moorland in the upland areas and a variety of agricultural uses at lower levels. There are large areas of designated conservation sites throughout the area. There are two titles named after the River Derwent in the British peerage, Viscount FitzAlan of Derwent which is extinct and Baron Derwent.

== Uses ==
The river is used for water abstraction, leisure and sporting activities and effluent disposal, and also has several important nature reserves. It is the subject of conflicting interests.

Water abstracted from the Derwent supplies towns and cities such as Hull, Leeds, York and Scarborough. The river water is of generally good quality with BOD levels remaining below 2 mg/L all year round. It is typical of northern British rivers in that it exhibits acid flushes at peak times of rainfall (during the winter months).

There are also several effluent sites scattered along this river at Malton, Stamford Bridge, Elvington, Wheldrake and Bubwith.

As of 2023 the River Derwent is only navigable by small powered craft between East Cottingwith Lock and Barmby Barrage. Upstream of East Cottingwith/Thorganby are the remains of the stanchions of an old bridge which are a choke point for drifting fallen trees, which prevent access. Additionally the locks at Elvington/Sutton on Derwent are silted and not accessible to river users.

== Geology ==
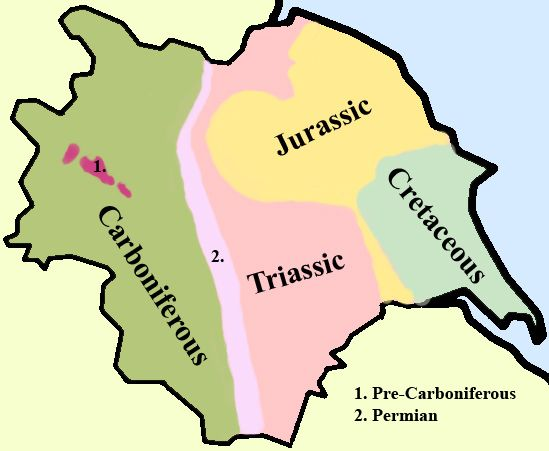
The geology of Yorkshire including the River Derwent catchment area

At its source on the North York Moors the River Derwent and its tributaries run over Corallian Limestone from the Jurassic period. Downstream of Stamford Bridge the catchment area is mainly of Sherwood Sandstone from the Triassic period. To the east this sandstone dips under Mercia Mudstone, also of the Triassic period. Some of the underlying rocks are major aquifers and provide a valuable source for water supply in the area. The major aquifers are the Corallian limestone, chalk and Sherwood sandstone. The Corallian Limestone outcrops on the hills surrounding the Vale of Pickering and is made up of a series of limestones and sandstones. This aquifer is unconfined in parts and gets water from the River Rye and River Derwent through swallow holes.

Before the last ice age the waters of the upper Derwent flowed east and discharged into the sea at Scalby, near Scarborough. The River Hertford, the present middle Derwent and the River Rye flowed east and discharged into the North Sea near Filey Brigg. During the Ice Age these outlets were blocked by a tongue of ice which extended down the North Sea basin carrying with it large amounts of glacial detritus. As the ice melted the detritus was deposited to form the Wykeham moraine and permanently blocked the eastern exits of the watercourse. Water from the melting ice and the North York Moors formed a lake in the Vale of Pickering which expanded and deepened until eventually the water escaped by overflowing at the lowest point at Kirkham. The water cut a gorge through the Howardian Hills as it drained away southwards, breaching the Escrick moraine just east of Wheldrake, and joining the Humber glacial lake.

== Climate ==
Rainfall and climate conditions vary slightly across the Derwent catchment area due to the topography. Annual rainfall ranges from averages of 600 millimetres (24 in) at Barmby Barrage to over 1,100 millimetres (43 in) at its source on the North York Moors.

== Course and character of the Derwent catchment area ==
For management purposes the catchment area has been divided into ten smaller units. Two of these units (Howe Bridge and Ness) relate to the River Rye which is the subject of a separate article. The other eight, starting at the source, are:

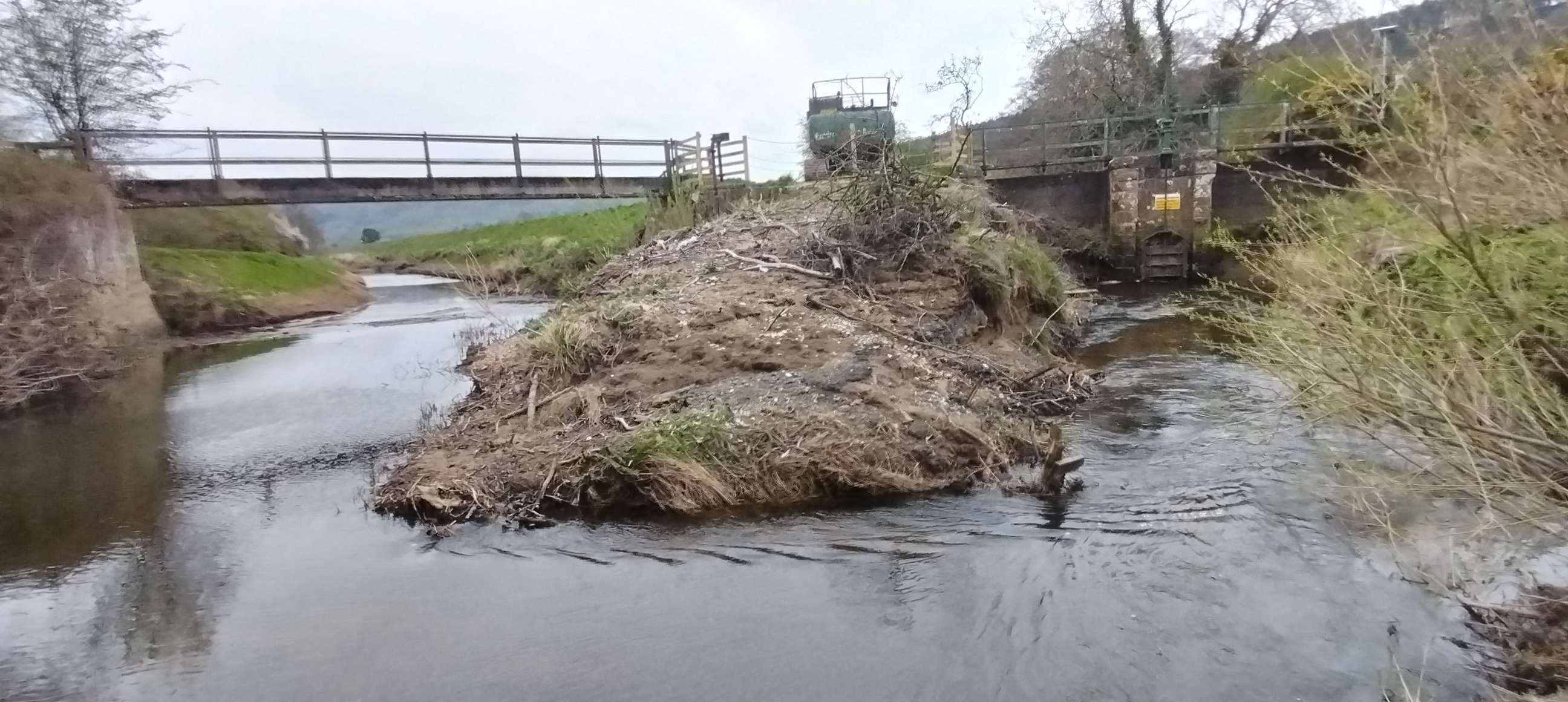
Point of divergence of the Sea Cut (left) from the Derwent (right); Weir Head Sluice (in the background on the right) limits the flow of the Derwent during flood conditions.

- East and West Ayton

The Derwent starts its course at Lilla Rig on the North York Moors a few miles from the east coast of Yorkshire. After collecting the waters of the Jugger Howe Beck, Black Beck and Troutdale Beck it flows south through the Forge Valley to East and West Ayton. From there it continues across lower ground to where it is joined by the River Hertford. The Sea Cut, a man made channel, connects the Derwent to the North Sea near Scarborough to alleviate flooding in the lower reaches of the Derwent, downstream of the Cut. This management area is about 127 km^{2} and largely rural with no major settlements. Corallian limestone lies beneath this area. The landscape is upland moors in the upper reaches with lower lying flatter land near Hackness. The river flows through the narrow Forge Valley and several designated natural conservation sites. Water is retained behind a weir at West Ayton and there are sink holes in the river bed where river water is lost to underlying aquifers, so that in drought years the river below the weir may run dry. There are no wastewater treatment works. The ecology and fisheries have a very high sensitivity to changes in water flow.

- River Hertford

The River Hertford starts close to Hunmanby near the seaside town of Filey and flows westwards into the Derwent. The management area is about 83 km^{2} with a largely rural economy of arable farming and managed grassland in a flat to undulating landscape. The underlying rock is Corallian Limestone but overlying deposits insulate the river water from this aquifer. Close to the river the land is less than 30 m high whilst to the south of the area on the slopes of the Yorkshire Wolds it reaches 100 m. The river flows in a narrow heavily modified channel. Water is discharged from water treatment works at Seamer, Folkton and Hunmanby.

- Low Marishes

Having been joined by the River Hertford, the Derwent turns sharply west and flows along the Vale of Pickering past Yedingham village. It is joined by the River Rye four miles upstream from Malton and then flows southwards. It covers an area of about 273 km^{2} (105 sq miles) and overlies the Corallian Limestone aquifer. The topography and land use are varied. The flat valley floor is less than 20 metres in height, and here the dominant land use is arable farming. In the northern part of this area lies the North York Moors National Park, where the land is used mainly for upland grazing and forestry. To the south are the Yorkshire Wolds and here the land rises to over 180 metres in height. There are waste-water treatment works at Thornton le Dale, East Heslerton and Sherburn.

- Kirkham Bridge

After leaving Malton the river flows south through the steep-sided valley of Kirkham Gorge past Howsham Mill and weir to Buttercrambe.

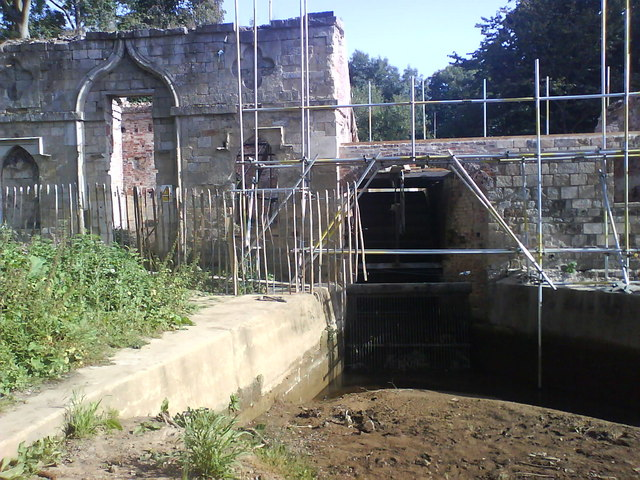
Howsham Mill is in the process of being restored.

- Buttercrambe

At Buttercrambe the river continues southwards and through Stamford Bridge. The above two areas have similar physical and ecological characteristics. They have a combined catchment area of 256 km^{2} (99 sq miles). Part of the Kirkham Bridge area is underlain by Corallian limestone. The areas are predominantly rural with undulating scenery. The Howardian Hills lie to the north of Buttercrambe and the Yorkshire Wolds to the east of Kirkham Bridge. There are many scattered villages in the agricultural landscape. The land near the river is less than 20 metres high. The River Derwent Special Area of Conservation runs through the length of both areas. There are waste-water treatment works at Foston, Leavening, Harton, Whenby, Welburn and Settrington.

- Sutton upon Derwent

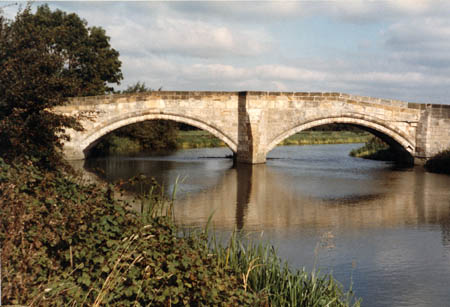
Bridge between Elvington and Sutton upon Derwent (1985)

The river continues southwards, cutting through the slightly higher surrounds of the Escrick moraine and into the Vale of York and past Wheldrake. This area covers 79 km^{2} (31 sq miles). It is low undulating agricultural land; the largest settlement is Stamford Bridge. The River Derwent in this area has many designated riverine conservation sites. There is a substantial public water supply abstraction point in the area which supplies 4.5 million people. There are significant waste-water treatment sites at Elvington, Stamford Bridge and Bugthorpe.

- East Cottingwith

At East Cottingwith the Derwent meanders across its flood plain still going south, and collects the waters of the Bielby Beck and the Pocklington Canal which form the major part of the catchment. This area is 199 km^{2} (77 sq miles). It is largely rural, having several scattered villages amongst open fields and common land in the Vale of York. Pocklington is the largest settlement. The area lies also on the undulating foothills of the Yorkshire Wolds. Pocklington Canal is 9.7 miles (15.6 km) long and joins the Derwent at East Cottingwith. In the southern part of the area the land is flat and low. On either side of the watercourse the land is rich and it is farmed as arable or permanent grassland. There are also hay meadows and pastures, known locally as Ings, which form part of the Lower Derwent Valley designated conservation sites. There are waste-water treatment sites at Pocklington, Bishop Wilton, Wilberfoss and Melbourne.

- Barmby Barrage

At Barmby Barrage the waters of the Derwent are separated from the tidal Ouse to prevent the tides polluting the water extraction plant at Loftsome Bridge. This area consists of the River Derwent from Sutton upon Derwent lock downstream to the confluence with the River Ouse at Barmby Barrage. It covers 116 km^{2} (45 sq miles) and it overlies the Sherwood Sandstone major aquifer. It is largely rural, with a few small villages in an agricultural landscape of pastures, meadows and arable fields. There are several designated conservation sites. There are waste-water treatment works at Wheldrake, Bubwith, Ellerton and North Duffield.

== Barmby Barrage ==
Water from the tidal River Ouse is prevented from entering the Derwent by means of a barrage at Barmby on the Marsh. The Derwent has been kept non-tidal since the 1970s because water is abstracted at Loftsome Bridge water treatment works to supply the City of Hull. The barrage has a navigation lock and two sluice gates. The objectives of the barrage are:

1. to exclude the waters of the Ouse from the Derwent
2. to maintain a depth of water for navigation and abstraction
3. to keep the river level low enough to permit drainage from the surrounding land.

The barrage has two sluice gates, each is 7 metres wide and 5 metres high. They are raised and lowered by ropes from winches mounted in a machine room in the centre of the barrage. To travel the 5 metres from the fully closed to the open position of the gates takes 10 minutes. There is a PLC system to control the opening and closing of the gates which incorporates river level sensors, gate position sensors and a motor control centre. On a rising tide in the River Ouse the gates are closed and they are only allowed to open again once the level of the Ouse has fallen below that of the Derwent. An electronic communications link provides data remotely to the UK Environment Agency.

== Natural history ==
The main river, its tributaries and adjacent wetlands are significant for nature conservation, ecology and landscape. The area contains a wide diversity of habitats and a number of designated sites.

- Special Protection Areas provide protection to birds, their nests, eggs and habitats. (SPAs)
- Special Areas of Conservation contribute to biodiversity by maintaining and restoring habitats and species other than birds. (SACs)
- Ramsar Sites are wetlands of international importance designated under the Ramsar Convention
- Sites of Special Scientific Interest (SSSIs)

SSSIs	SACs	SPAs	Ramsar sites
River Derwent, Derwent Ings, Breighton Meadows, Skipwith Common, Melbourne and Thornton Ings, Pocklington Canal, Newton Mask, Kirkham Park and Riverside, Jeffrey Bog, Ellers Wood and Sand Dale, Raincliffe Woods and Forge Valley.	River Derwent, Skipwith Common, Lower Derwent Valley, Ellers Wood and Sand Dale, North York Moors.	Lower Derwent Valley, North York Moors.	Lower Derwent Valley

== History ==
The unusual upstream-facing outfall of the Derwent is man-made. It is believed to have been cut during the Roman occupation of Britain to reduce the distance between the Derwent mouth and the Roman legionary headquarters at York by 9 miles. The first navigation weir, also believed to be of Roman origin, was a flash weir built near Wheldrake to raise the level of the river upstream and regulate its flow downstream.

It has been suggested that the name "Derwent" is related to that of Deira, one of the post-Roman kingdoms that later became Northumbria. a derivation also found in the Latin name for Malton, Derventio.

During the reign of King John (1199–1216) a water mill on the Derwent at Wheldrake was given to the monks of Fountains Abbey, and later in the 13th century a weir is known to have existed at the same place.

By 1462 when the Lord Mayor of York was authorised to "correct and amend defects" of the Derwent "from the Ouse as far as the town and bridge of Sutton upon Derwent" the river must have been navigable at least to Sutton. A corn mill existed at Sutton upon Derwent by 1597. It was rebuilt in 1836 and continued in use until 1960. There are other water mill sites at Stamford Bridge, Buttercrambe, Howsham, Kirkham and Malton.

River Derwent Navigation Act 1702
- Act of Parliament
- Parliament of England
- Long title: An Act for making the River Darwent, in the County of Yorke, navigable.
- Citation: 1 Ann. c. 14 (Note: This is the citation in The Statutes of the Realm.); 1 Ann. St. 1. c. 20 (Note: This is the citation in The Statutes at Large.)
- Territorial extent: England and Wales

Dates
- Royal assent: 6 May 1702
- Commencement: 8 March 1702 (Note: Start of session.)
- Repealed
Other legislation
Repealed by	River Derwent Navigation Act Revocation Order 1935

Status: Repealed

Text of statute as originally enacted

Before the 18th century coal was usually taken by coastal shipping from Newcastle or Sunderland and put into smaller vessels at coastal ports to be delivered to upriver destinations. For this purpose there was an interest in improving navigation on the Derwent as far as Malton. The River Derwent Navigation Act 1702 (1 Ann. c. 14) was passed authorising its proprietors to improve the river. Towpaths were laid out and "locks, turnpikes, pens for water, wharfs and warehouses" were constructed. The promoters of these works were allowed to charge tolls on the cargo carried on any part of the river.

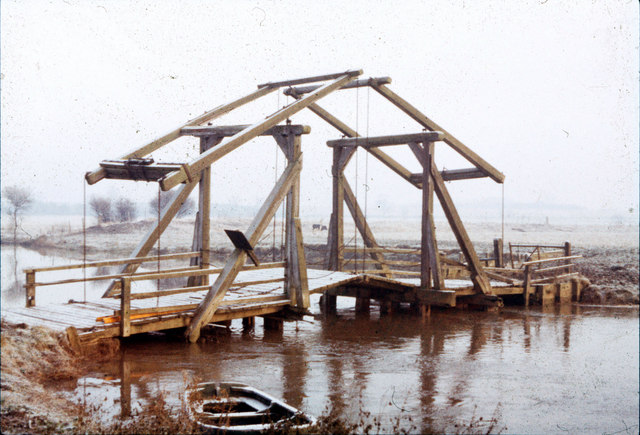
The Old Ings Bridge over the River Derwent at Wheldrake in 1961

The owners of land near the river complained in 1722 that the new locks and weirs caused them to lose income because their meadows were more often flooded. In 1793 thirty-five vessels were trading from Malton, carrying corn downstream to the West Riding towns and returning upstream with coal. Virtually every village and hamlet near the tidal river had its own landing place.

In 1845 the York and North Midland Railway was built to join the West Riding to Scarborough via Malton. Much of the freight traffic of the Derwent Navigation was transferred to the cheaper railway. In 1855 the railway managers bought the Navigation, and to further stifle competition they charged high tolls on barge freight. More cargo was moved to the railway, and by the 1890s the only regular trade on the Derwent was on its lower reaches.

By the beginning of the 20th century the river was being used for pleasure craft, and by 1920 there were craft based regularly at Stamford Bridge and Kirkham Abbey. After floods in 1930 damaged the lock gates at Kirkham, several vessels were stranded upstream. The statutory Right of Navigation was revoked above Sutton Lock by the River Derwent Navigation Act Revocation Order 1935 (SR&O 1935/978). There followed a long series of fights for public access against riparian interests which continue to the present day.

== Economy ==
The economic profile of the River Derwent is dominated by its value as a water resource with the Derwent supplying Leeds, Hull, York and Scarborough as well as agricultural holdings along its course. The river is popular with anglers throughout its course, and Hull & District Anglers Association, York & District Amalgamation of Anglers, Leeds & District Amalgamated Society of Anglers among many other smaller clubs and syndicates have stretches along the river. It also has many valuable conservation areas and Sites of Special Scientific Interest.

== Settlements ==
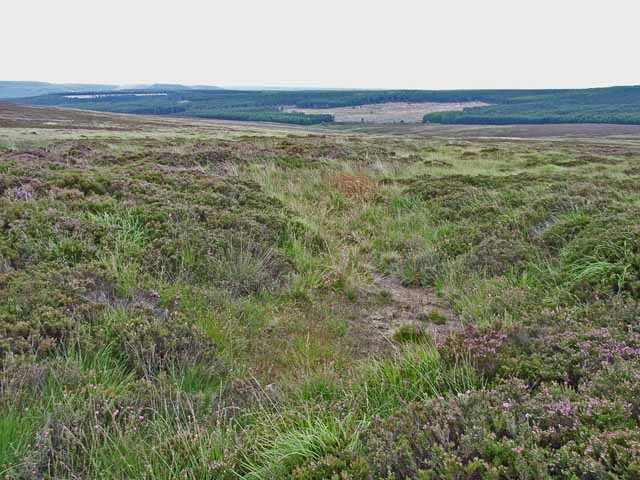
Fylingdales moor

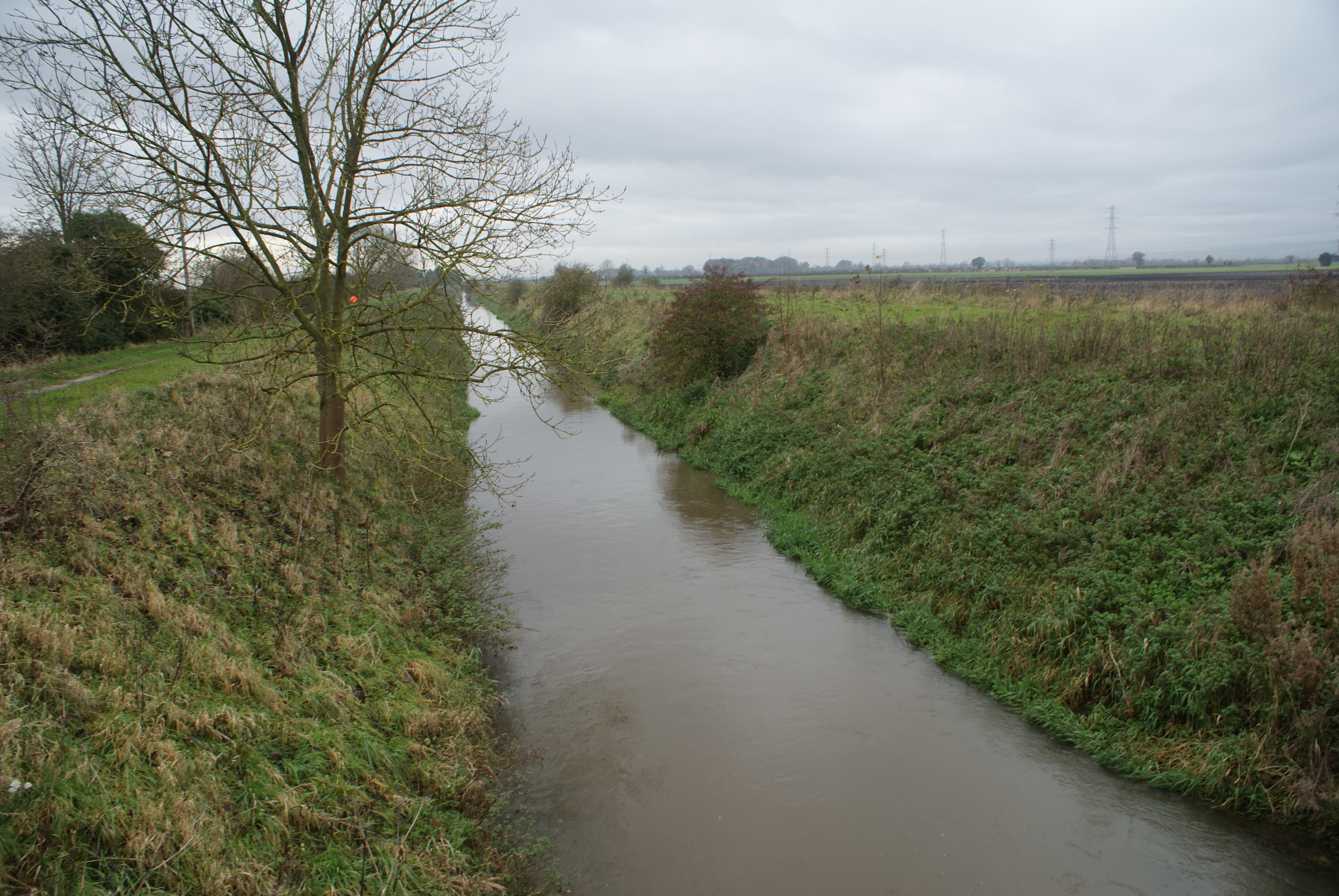

- Broxa
- West Ayton
- East Ayton
- Yedingham
- Old Malton
- Malton
- Norton-on-Derwent
- Low Hutton
- Kirkham
- Crambe
- Howsham
- Scrayingham
- Buttercrambe
- Stamford Bridge
- Gate Helmsley
- Low Catton
- Kexby
- Elvington
- Sutton upon Derwent
- West Cottingwith
- Thorganby
- Ellerton
- Aughton
- Bubwith
- Breighton
- Wressle
- Barmby on the Marsh

== See also ==
- Deira
- Derwent College of the University of York
- Raincliffe Woods
- Rivers of the United Kingdom
