= Raincliffe Woods =

Wood in North Yorkshire, England

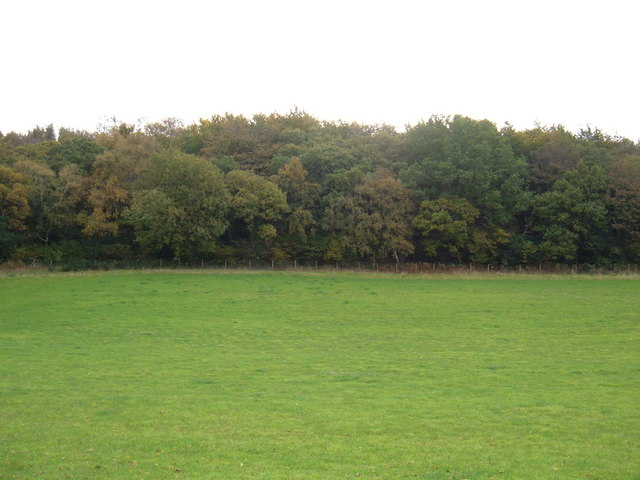
- Northern edge
- Interactive map of Raincliffe Woods
- Type: Mixed Ancient Woodland
- Location: England
- OS grid: SE9988
- Coordinates: 54°16′48″N 0°28′30″W
- Area: 161.9 hectares (400 acres)
- Operator: Raincliffe Woods Community Enterprise Interest Company
- Status: Site of Special Scientific Interest
- Website: raincliffewoods.co.uk

Raincliffe Woods are situated to the north-west of Scarborough, North Yorkshire, England. They form an "L" shape with Forge Valley Woods and the River Derwent.

== Geography ==
The area is a mixed woodland area designated as "planted ancient woodland", and combined with Forge Valley Woods is a Site of Special Scientific Interest (SSSI).

There are many paths, tracks and bridleways through the small woods which many residents of Scarborough use for mountain biking, dog walking and Sunday strolls. Throxenby Mere, a popular place for angling, is located at the foot of the woods.

Deer, badgers, squirrels, frogs, toads, foxes and all kinds of birds can be seen in the woods.
