= Howsham, North Yorkshire =

Village and civil parish in North Yorkshire, England

Coordinates: 54°03′22″N 0°52′31″W

Howsham
- Location within North Yorkshire
- Population: 273 (Including Scrayingham. 2011 census)
- OS grid reference: SE737628
- Unitary authority: North Yorkshire
- Ceremonial county: North Yorkshire
- Region: Yorkshire and the Humber
- Country: England
- Sovereign state: United Kingdom
- Post town: YORK
- Postcode district: YO60
- Police: North Yorkshire
- Fire: North Yorkshire
- Ambulance: Yorkshire
- UK Parliament: Thirsk and Malton

Howsham is a village and civil parish in North Yorkshire, England.

The name Howsham derives from the plural form of either the Old English hūs or the Old Norse hús, meaning 'house'.

The village is home to St John's Church, Howsham and Howsham Hall. Howsham appeared as Husun in the Domesday Book.

Historically the village was part of the East Riding of Yorkshire until 1974. From 1974 to 2023 the village was in the Ryedale district. It is now administered by North Yorkshire Council.

Howsham was served by Howsham railway station on the York to Scarborough Line between 1845 and 1849. George Hudson (1800–1871), an English railway financier and politician was born in Howsham.

== See also ==
- Listed buildings in Howsham, North Yorkshire

== Gallery ==
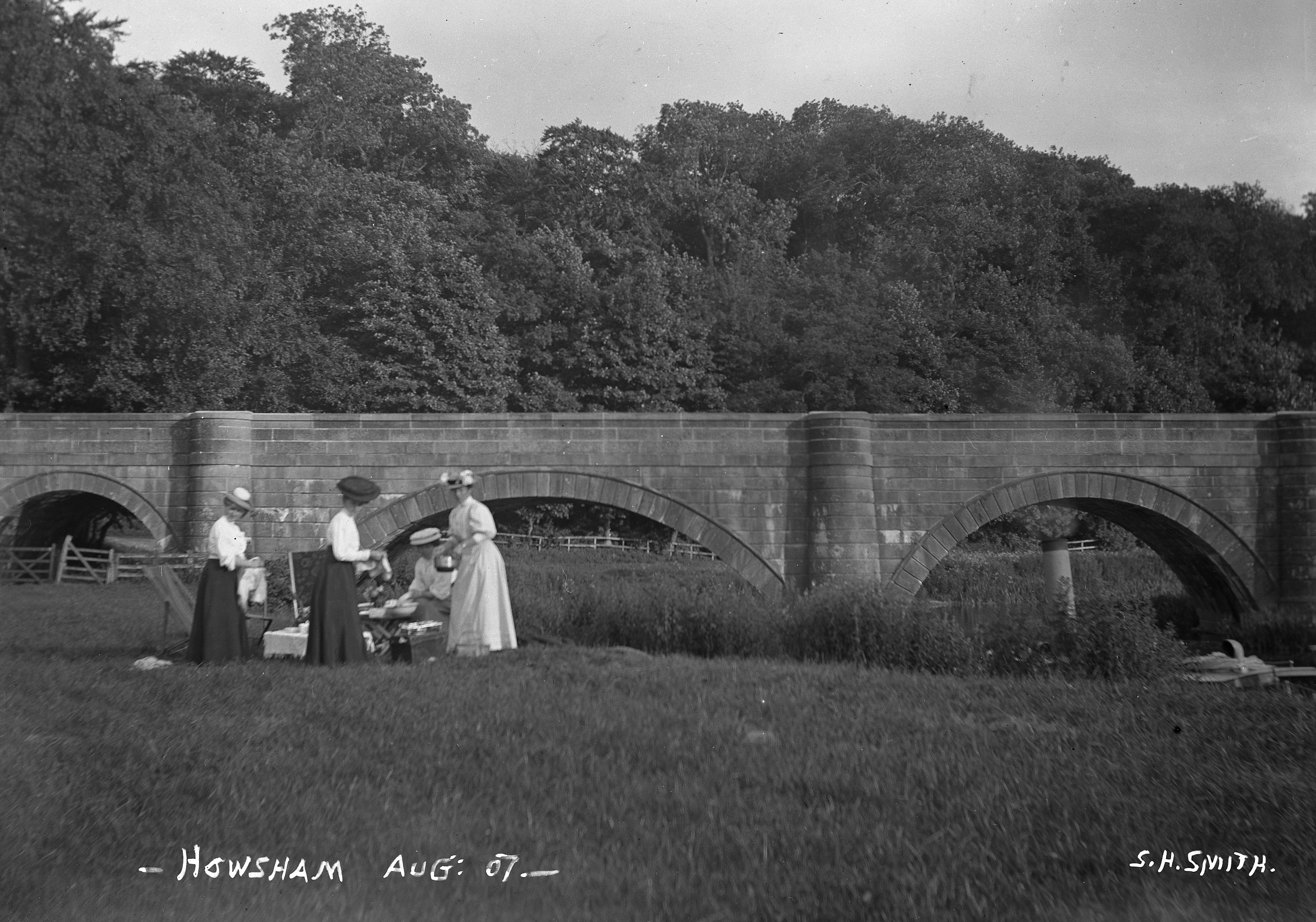
Howsham Bridge with picnickers, August 1907

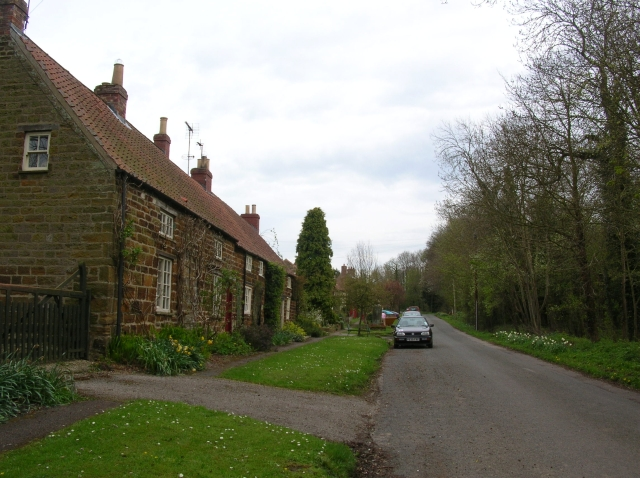
Cottages in Howsham

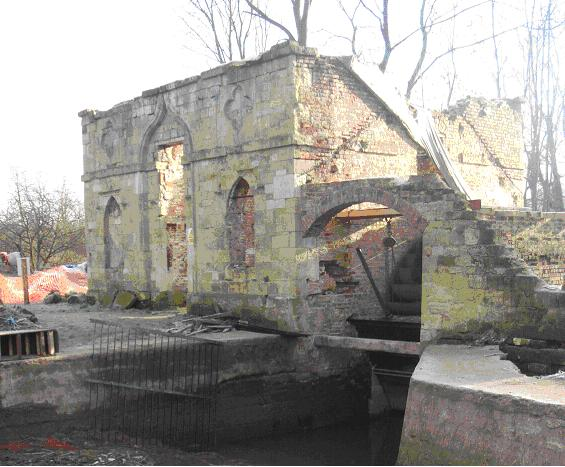
Howsham Mill

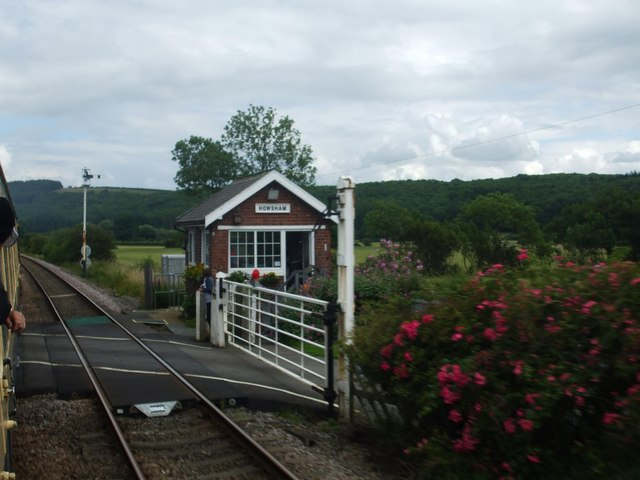
Howsham signal box and crossing
