= North Eastern Railway tile maps =

Ceramic railway maps

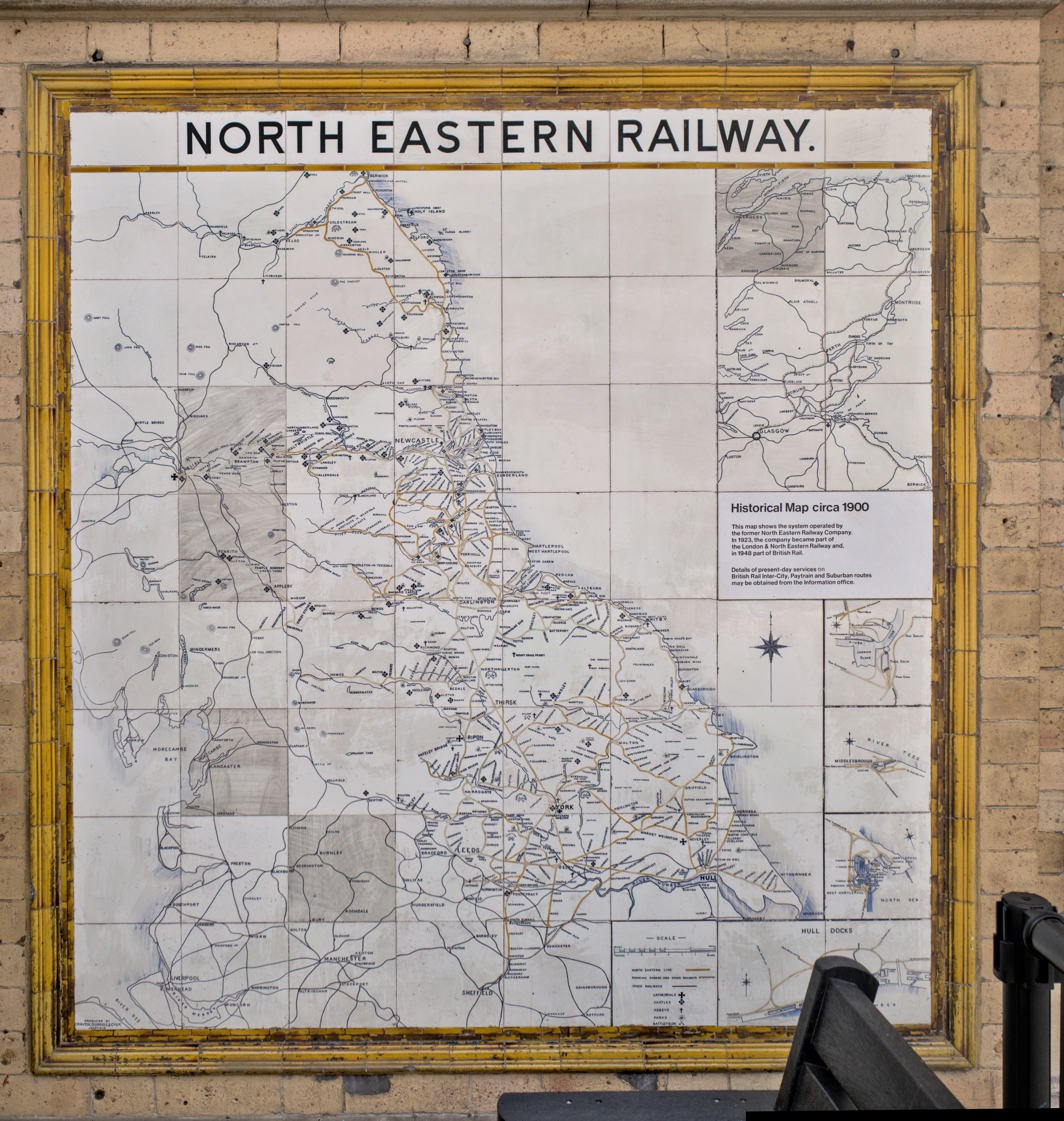
- Material: Clay
- Created: 1900-1910
- Present location: See list

North Eastern Railway tile maps were ceramic railway maps installed at various stations across the North Eastern Railway's (NER) operating area during the early part of the 20th century. The tile maps detail the lines owned and operated by the NER at the time of their installation, though at least one detailed line was never built. Nine of the original maps still exist in their original locations.

== History ==
The tile maps were introduced to many stations on the North Eastern Railway between 1900 and 1910. (Note: Most sources agree that they were introduced in 1900, but in his book, Railway Stations of the North East, Ken Hoole states they were introduced in 1902. However, Hoole also wrote a letter to the editor of The Railway Magazine in 1975, where he states they were introduced in 1900.) Some were even located away from the NER network, such as at London King's Cross. The maps consisted of 64 square tiles detailing the railway lines (measuring 8 inches (200 mm) x 8 inches (200 mm)), eight half tiles for the title, and 46 tiles around the border. The maps measured 5 feet 8 inches (1.73 m) by 5 feet 4 inches (1.63 m) and were made by Craven Dunnill whose works were in Jackfield, Shropshire. Each tile was white, and was marked with burnt sienna for the railway lines. A reversed image of the design for each tile was carved in copper and stamped on a pre-warmed tile, then the burnt sienna added, and the tile fired and glazed to complete.

Over the years, people have pointed out errors on the maps, such as the layout at Malton being incorrect, spelling mistakes, and the inclusion of the North Holderness Light Railway, which was never built. The map's designer, not wishing the maps to be obsolete as soon as they were erected, included the proposed line, but the NER never went ahead with constructing the line.

Around 25 of the maps were made and installed at various locations, but only twelve of the original maps remain, and of those, only nine are original maps in their original locations. The maps also showed neighbouring railway companies lines, so the mapping stretched as far south and west as the Dee Estuary of Cheshire, up to Berwick upon Tweed, with more tiles placed where the North Sea is, showing insets of north-east Scotland.

After closure of many lines in the old North Eastern Railway area of operations, some of the tile maps, such as at Darlington, were boarded over to avoid confusing passengers. The map on York railway station was covered over with posters, but in 1969, it was realised that the map itself was of historical interest, and so it was uncovered again.

Bridlington's map was removed when the station was renovated in 1987. The works involved removing the old platforms 1,2, and 3 and the tile map was thought destroyed in the process. However, some of the old tiles were discovered at Hull Paragon station and the renovated map was reinstalled at Bridlington in January 2022. The maps at Beverley, Scarborough, Tynemouth, and York, form part of their Historic England graded listings.

Other companies also had tiles maps, such as the LBSCR who installed one at London Victoria, and the Lancashire & Yorkshire Railway who had one built into the wall at Manchester Victoria.

A private company has been contracted to create the tile maps again. These are hand-made in the same area as the Craven Dunnill factory, in what is now a UNESCO World Heritage site.

== Locations ==
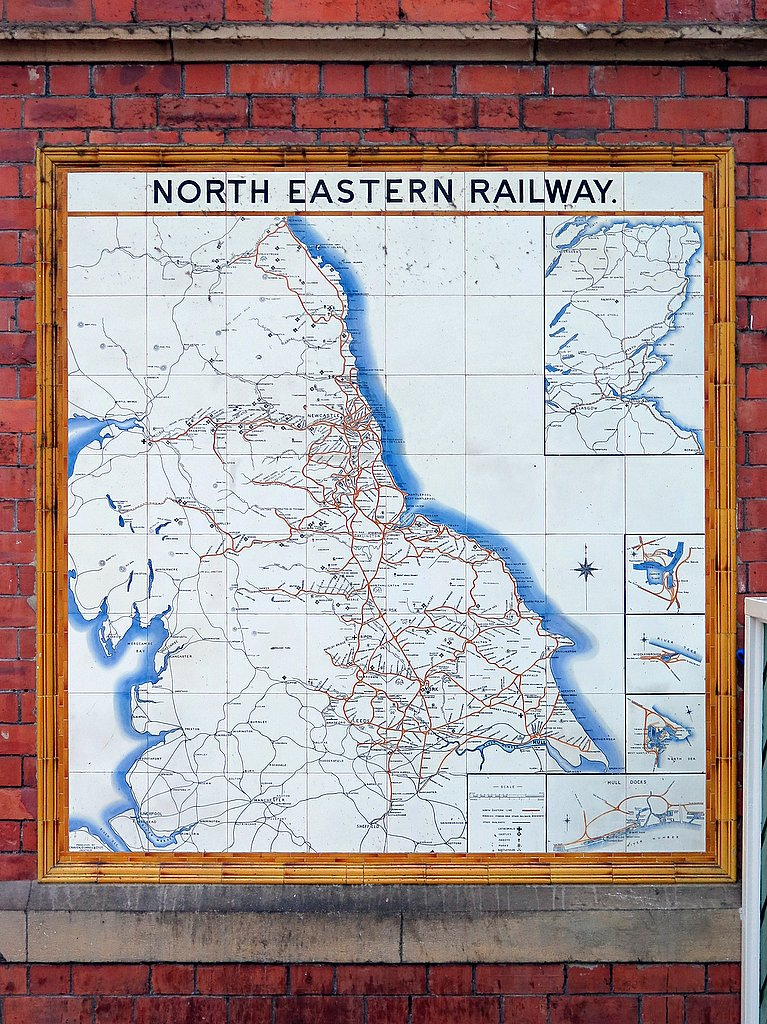
Tile map of North Eastern Railway, Tynemouth Metro Station

Locations in italics are one of the nine stations which retain their original maps from c. 1900.

Station	Details	Ref
Beverley	The tile map forms part of the Historic England listing (Grade II)	
Bridlington	Removed in 1987, and returned to the station partially completed in 2022.	
Darlington	The tile map was removed from Darlington railway station (known as Bank Top) in early 1973. It was donated to the Darlington Museum, later renamed to Hopetown Darlington.	
Driffield		
Filey		
Hartlepool		
Hunmanby	A new map was created and installed in 2021	
London King's Cross	Now at the NRM in Shildon	
Middlesbrough		
Morpeth	The tile map was whitewashed in the Second World War to prevent enemy troops using it to navigate their way around.	
Newcastle	Was removed to the York Railway Museum, precursor of the National Railway Museum	
Saltburn		
Scarborough		
South Shields	Installed in 1905, moved to the South Shields Museum in 1998 after the station was demolished and moved.	
Tynemouth		
Whitby		
York	York station was the first one that was installed.	
