= North Holderness Light Railway =

Proposed railway in Yorkshire, England

Coordinates: 53.963°N 0.330°W

Tile map showing the route

The North Holderness Light Railway was a proposed light railway, which was to have been constructed by the North Eastern Railway (NER) between Beverley and North Frodingham, in the East Riding of Yorkshire, England. The scheme was given approval in September 1898 by the North Holderness Light Railway Order 1898 (under the Light Railways Act 1896) for a line extending to 12.5 miles (20.1 km).

The line would have begun from a junction with the Hull to Scarborough Line, slightly to the north of Beverley railway station, and served villages and agricultural land in the Holderness area. Stations were proposed at Tickton, Routh, Long Riston, Leven, Brandesburton and North Frodingham. At North Frodingham the line would have shared a station with a separate light railway, the Bridlington and North Frodingham (also never built), running to Carnaby on the Hull to Scarborough Line.

The NER abandoned the plans for the North Holderness line in 1903 and a bus service was provided instead, connecting Beverley to North Frodingham and then continuing to Driffield. Buses began running on 7 September 1903 and the route was the second bus service to be operated by a British railway company. The service continued to be run by the NER and its successor, the London and North Eastern Railway, until 1933 when it was sold to a local bus company.

Plans for a railway were later reconsidered, though with the line built to a narrower gauge than standard gauge on account of some of the marshy land that the line would have to cross, and in 1919 Darlington Works designed a 2 ft (610 mm) gauge tank locomotive.

The route was shown on tiled maps of the North Eastern Railway network at some of their stations. These maps are still extant at Beverley, Hartlepool, Middlesbrough, Saltburn, Scarborough, Tynemouth, Whitby and York. An example can also be seen at the National Railway Museum.
