= Flamborough railway station =

Disused railway station in the East Riding of Yorkshire, England

Flamborough
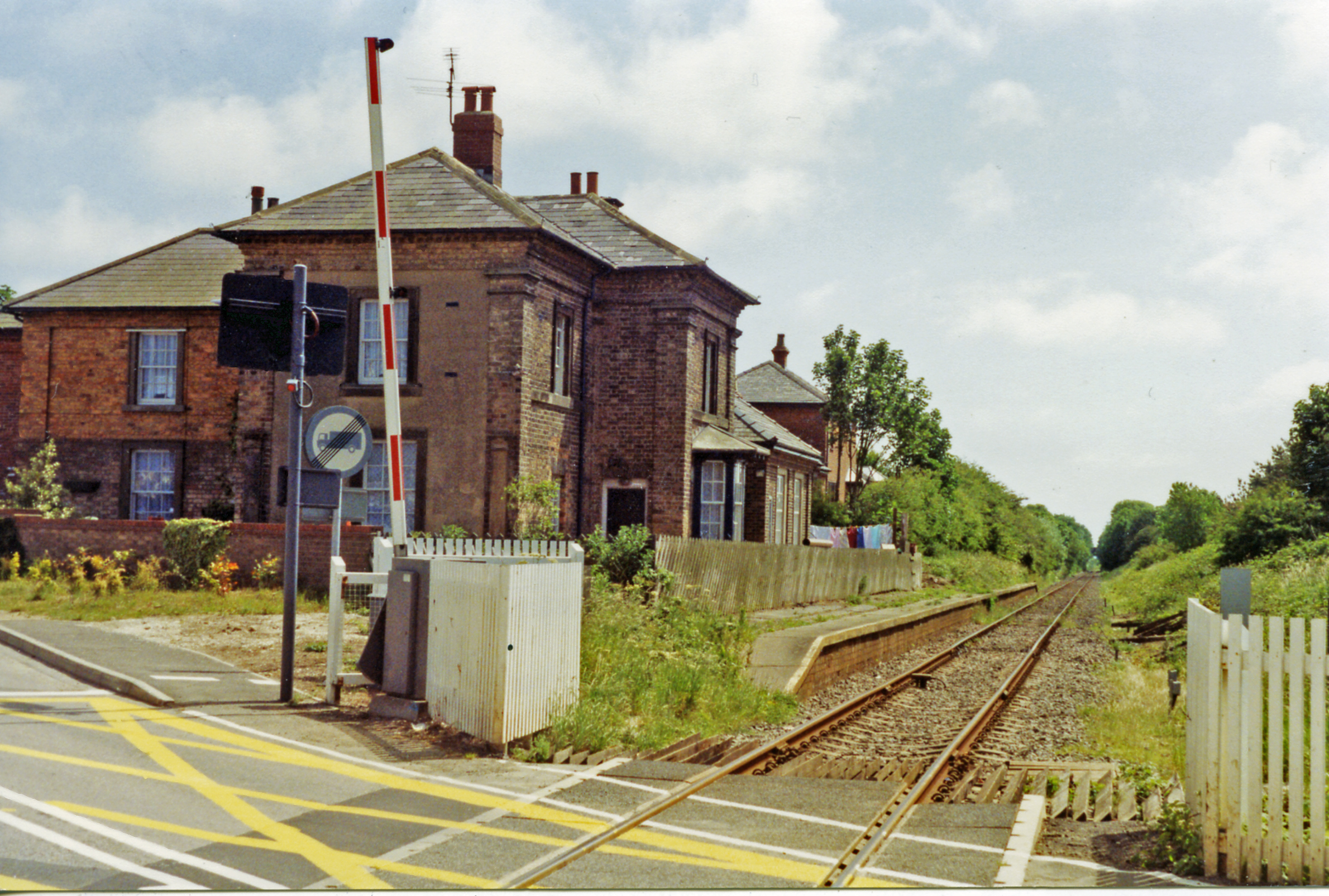
- The station and crossing in 1997

General information
- Location: Marton, East Riding of Yorkshire; England
- Coordinates: 54.112619°N 0.171000°W
- Grid reference: TA195700
- Platforms: 2

Other information
- Status: Disused

History
- Original company: York and North Midland Railway
- Pre-grouping: North Eastern Railway
- Post-grouping: London and North Eastern Railway

Key dates
- 20 October 1847: Opened as Marton
- 1 July 1884: Renamed Flamborough
- 10 August 1964: Closed to goods
- 5 January 1970: Closed completely
Location

Flamborough railway station was located in the village of Marton, and was originally named after that location. However, there were several other railway stations also called Marton, so on 1 July 1884 the North Eastern Railway renamed it after the village of Flamborough several miles away. It was situated on the Yorkshire Coast Line from Scarborough to Hull and was opened on 20 October 1847 by the York and North Midland Railway.

The station was 33 miles (53 km) north of Hull, and 17 miles (27 km) south of Seamer railway station.

== History ==
The station was opened by the York and North Midland Railway in October 1847. It was on the last section of the Hull to Scarborough line to be opened; Hull to Bridlington had been achieved in October 1846, and southwards from Seamer to Filey was in use by the same month. The station was located immediately north of the gated level crossing that spanned the road from Marton, and had a G. T. Andrews designed building. The extra effort put into Flamborough station was due to the influence of the Yarburgh family of nearby Sewerby Hall, who used the station. It was located 33 miles 31 chains (53.7 km) north of Hull and 16 miles 47 chains (26.7 km) south of Seamer.

The station had a small goods yard which was the nearest loading point for fish landed at Flamborough. Previous to the opening of the railway, carts of fresh fish used to travel the 36 miles (58 km) south to Hull. Even so, the demand of transporting the fish the 3 1/2 miles (5.6 km) to the station from Flamborough Head, was seen as a bar to good business. The distance between the station and coast was also seen as detrimental to the burgeoning tourist trade and in the 1890s, a branch was proposed by the residents, something which the North Eastern Railway considered, but refused to undertake.

The goods yard handled mostly fish (notably 90 tonnes (99 tons) of herring in August 1889), corn and coal. The NER had a policy of making their stationmasters the agent for the handling of coal, which guaranteed traffic for the railway company. The station master at Flamborough in 1920 had an annual wage of £230, but the profit on the coal handled at the station was £95. Wagons loaded with fish were allowed to be attached to Hull-bound trains via gravity whilst the Hull service was waiting in the southbound platform.

Cattle and stone were also handled at the station; the chalk cutting just to the north of the station was opened out into a quarry in 1876. During the First World War, the line was singled as an economy measure. Double track was restored in 1923, though three years after the station closed (1973), British Rail singled the section between Bridlington and Filey. The station was host to a LNER camping coach from 1935 to 1939.

The station closed to goods traffic in August 1964, and closed completely on 5 January 1970.

In 1976, the station was given Grade II listed building status.

Preceding station	Historical railways	Following station
Bridlington	Y&NMR; Hull and Scarborough Line	Bempton
