= Bempton railway station =

Railway station in the East Riding of Yorkshire, England

Bempton
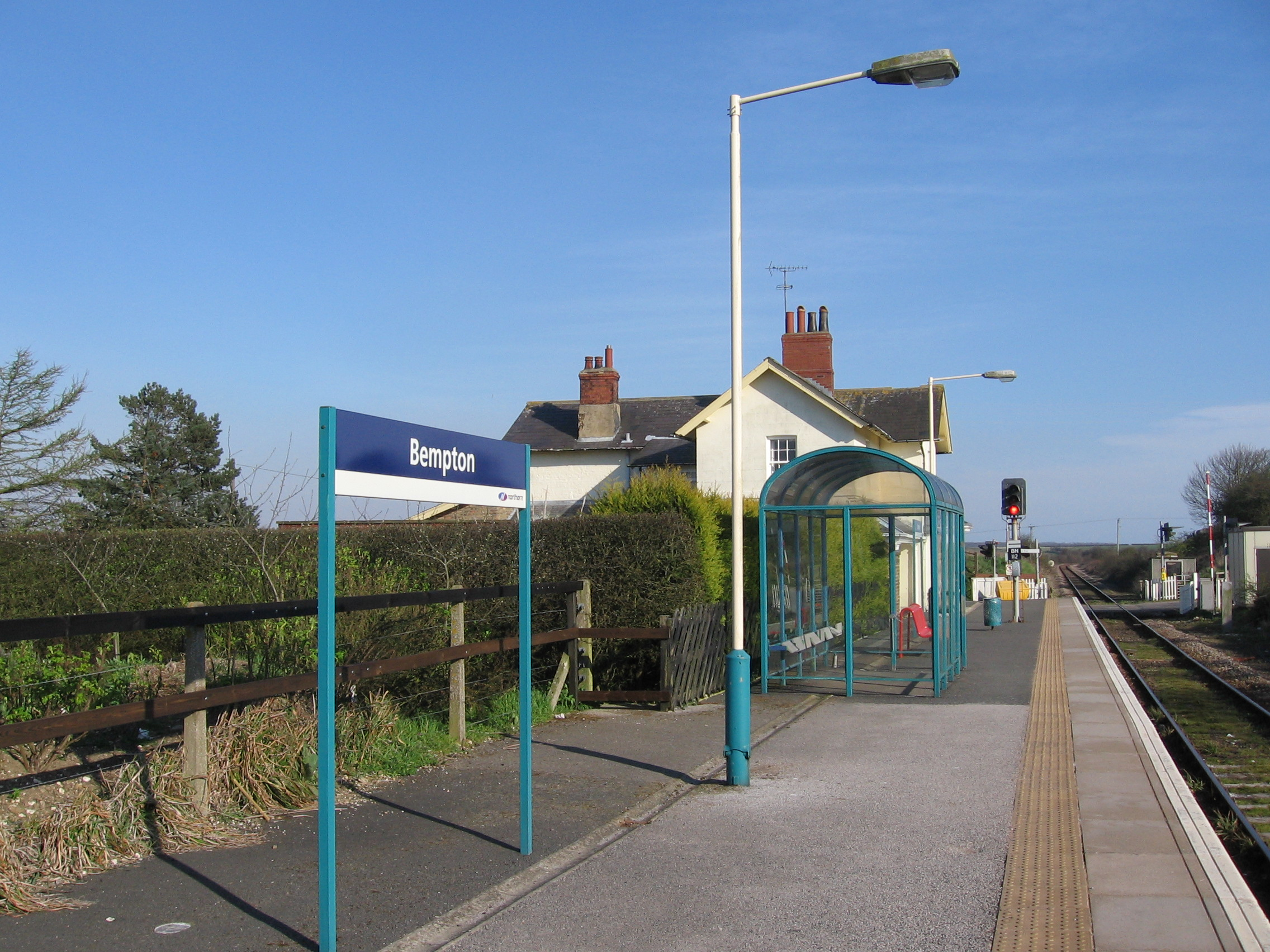

General information
- Location: Bempton, East Riding of Yorkshire; England
- Coordinates: 54.12780°N 0.17920°W
- Grid reference: TA189717
- Manager: Northern
- Platforms: 1

Other information
- Station code: BEM
- Classification: DfT category F2

History
- Opened: 20 October 1847

Passengers
- 2021/22: ▲18,076
- 2022/23: ▲21,098
- 2023/24: ▼20,752
- 2024/25: ▲23,682
- 2025/26: ▲31,266
Location
Notes
- Passenger statistics from the Office of Rail and Road

Bempton railway station serves the village of Bempton in the East Riding of Yorkshire, England. It is situated on the Yorkshire Coast Line and is operated by Northern Trains, who provide all passenger train services.

The station is the closest railway stop to the RSPB Bempton Cliffs nature reserve, making it a key access point for tourists and birdwatchers visiting the coastal seabird colonies.

== History ==
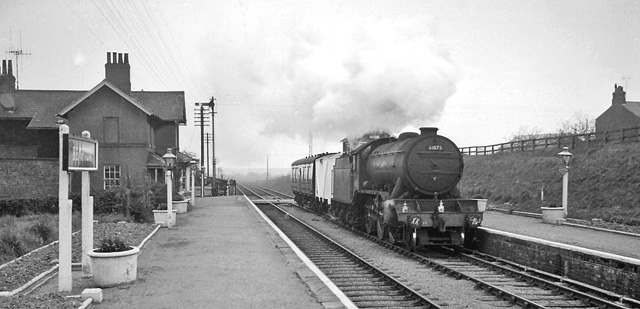
Bempton station in 1961

=== Opening and North Eastern Railway era ===
The station was opened on 6 October 1847 by the York and North Midland Railway as part of its extension from Bridlington to Filey, completing the coastal connection through to Scarborough. In 1854, the Y&NMR was amalgamated into the North Eastern Railway (NER).

Originally built with two platforms and a passing loop, the station featured a stone-built main station building on the up (southbound) platform, housing a booking office, waiting rooms, and the stationmaster's quarters. A small goods yard lay to the east, handling agricultural freight, timber, livestock, and locally quarried chalk.

=== LNER and British Railways ===
Following the Groupings of 1923, Bempton passed to the London and North Eastern Railway (LNER), and subsequently to the Eastern Region of British Railways upon nationalisation in 1948.

During the mid-20th century, traffic at Bempton remained steady due to local agricultural transport and summer holiday excursion trains running along the East Coast. However, goods facilities were progressively rationalised in the postwar era, leading to the closure of the goods yard to general traffic on 4 May 1964.

=== Rationalisation and single-tracking ===
Although recommended for review in the Beeching Report of 1963, the Hull–Bridlington–Scarborough line was retained to serve coastal communities. Nevertheless, Bempton underwent major operational simplification during the late 1960s and 1970s:

- The station was unstaffed in January 1969, with the main station buildings subsequently demolished.
- In 1985, as part of signalling rationalisation by British Rail, the line between Bridlington and Hunmanby was singled. The down platform at Bempton was decommissioned and removed, leaving a single operational platform serving trains in both directions.

== Facilities and community adoption ==
The station retains a single active platform equipped with a modern passenger shelter, digital real-time information displays, a help point, and automated ticket vending machines. Step-free access is available from Station Road directly onto the platform.

In recent years, Bempton station has benefited from community rail partnerships. Local volunteers and the Yorkshire Coast Community Rail Partnership (YCCRP) maintain planter displays, artwork, and directional signage guiding walkers along the 1.25-mile (2.0 km) pedestrian route to RSPB Bempton Cliffs.

== Services ==
All services at Bempton are operated by Northern Trains. The standard off-peak service pattern is:

- One train per hour southbound to Bridlington, Beverley, and Hull (with selected peak services continuing to Doncaster or Sheffield).
- One train per hour northbound to Filey and Scarborough.

Services are operated primarily by British Rail Class 170 and British Rail Class 158 diesel multiple units.

Preceding station	National Rail	Following station
Bridlington	Northern Yorkshire Coast Line	Hunmanby
Historical railways
Flamborough Station closed; Line open	Y&NMR Hull and Scarborough Line	Speeton Station closed; Line open

== See also ==
- Yorkshire Coast Line
- RSPB Bempton Cliffs
- North Eastern Railway (UK)
