= Gristhorpe railway station =

Disused railway station in North Yorkshire, England

Gristhorpe
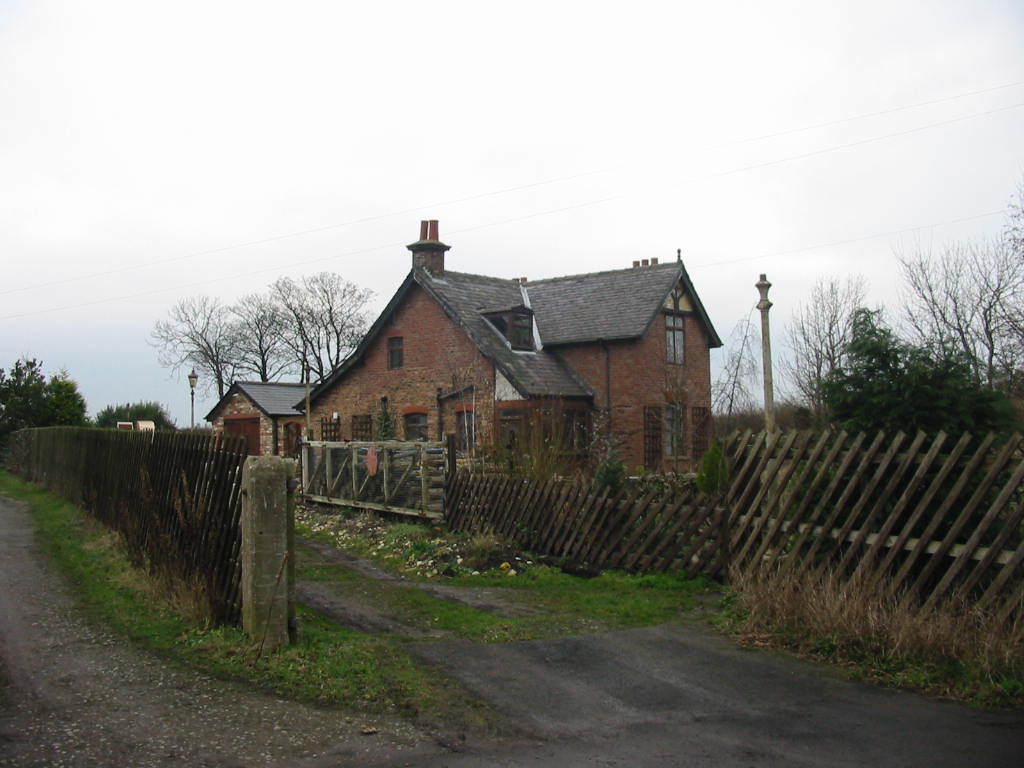
- Gristhorpe railway station in 2006, from the south side of the level crossing

General information
- Location: Gristhorpe, North Yorkshire; England
- Coordinates: 54.217965°N 0.341000°W
- Grid reference: TA082815
- Platforms: 2

Other information
- Status: Disused

History
- Original company: York and North Midland Railway
- Pre-grouping: North Eastern Railway
- Post-grouping: London and North Eastern Railway

Key dates
- 1846: opened
- 1959: closed
Location

Gristhorpe railway station was a minor railway station on the Yorkshire Coast Line from Scarborough to Hull, serving the villages of Gristhorpe and Lebberston, and was opened on 5 October 1846 by the York and North Midland Railway. It closed on 16 February 1959.

Parts of both platforms survive at the site (though the line itself is now single track), along with a brick signal box (to work the manually operated level crossing gates and protecting signals) and the now privately occupied station house.

Preceding station	Historical railways	Following station
Filey	Y&NMR; Hull and Scarborough Line	Cayton; Station closed; Line open
