= Cayton railway station =

Disused railway station in North Yorkshire, England

Cayton
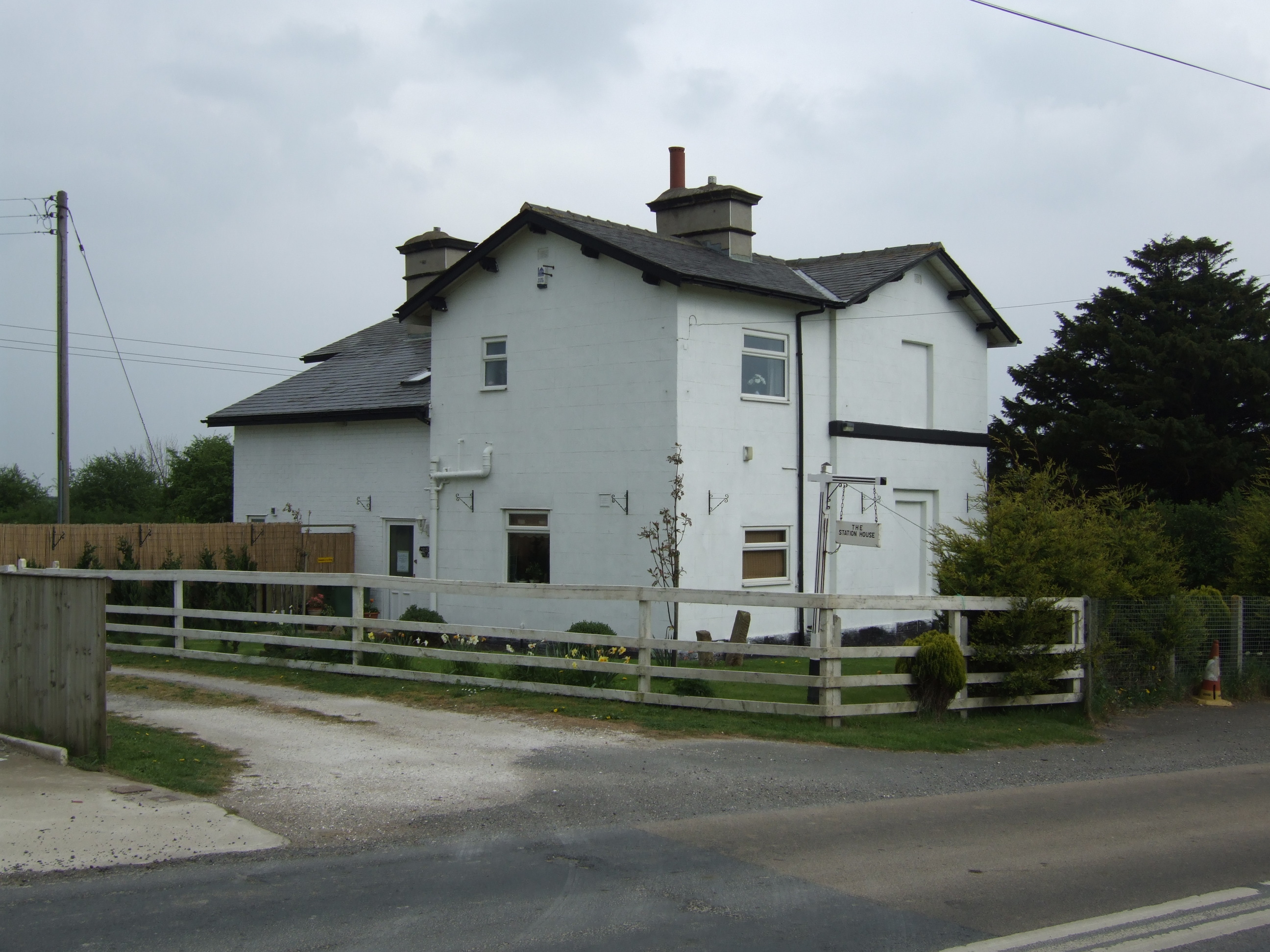
- Cayton railway station in 2007

General information
- Location: Cayton, North Yorkshire; England
- Coordinates: 54.227123°N 0.377900°W
- Grid reference: TA058824
- Platforms: 2

Other information
- Status: Disused

History
- Original company: York and North Midland Railway
- Pre-grouping: North Eastern Railway
- Post-grouping: London and North Eastern Railway

Key dates
- 1846: opened
- 1952: closed
Location

Cayton railway station was a minor railway station serving the village of Cayton on the Yorkshire Coast Line from Scarborough to Hull and was opened on 5 October 1846 by the York and North Midland Railway. It closed on 5 May 1952.

Like its neighbour at Gristhorpe, the former station house here remains standing as a private dwelling. The former signal box here has though been demolished, as the level crossing it worked has been converted to automatic barrier operation. One platform has also survives, though it is heavily overgrown and difficult to see.

Preceding station	Historical railways	Following station
Gristhorpe; Station closed; Line open	Y&NMR; Hull and Scarborough Line	Seamer; Station and Line open
