= Speeton railway station =

Disused railway station in North Yorkshire, England

Speeton
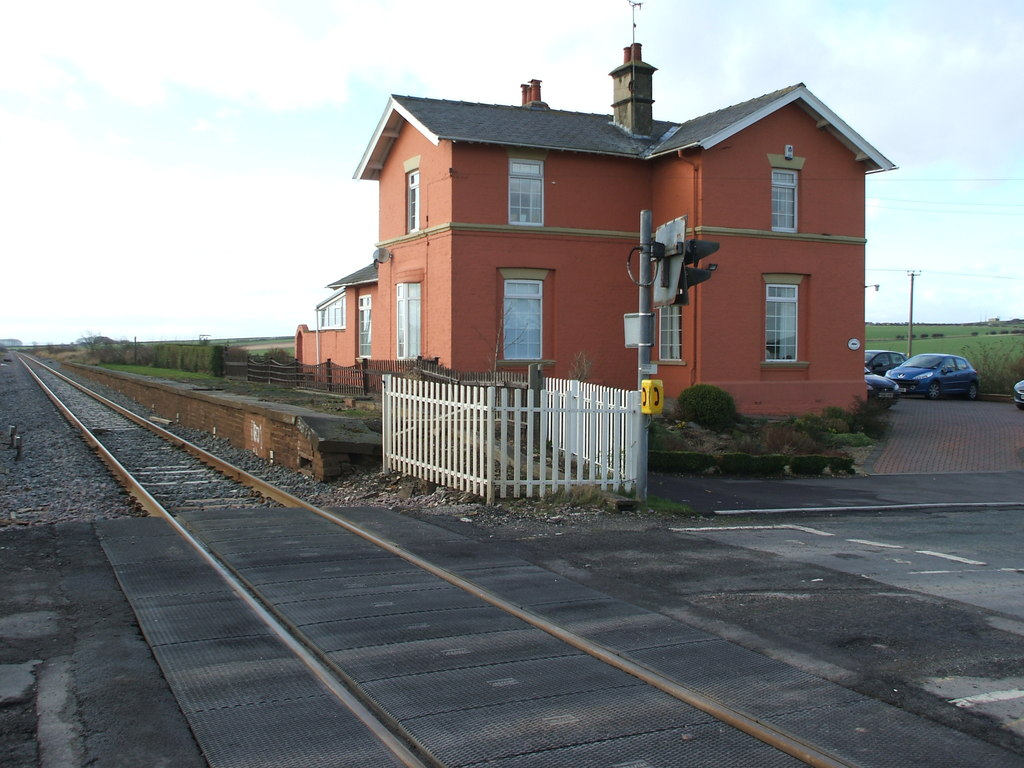
- Station building in 2008

General information
- Location: Speeton, North Yorkshire; England
- Coordinates: 54.147150°N 0.242100°W
- Grid reference: TA149739
- Platforms: 2

Other information
- Status: Disused

History
- Original company: York and North Midland Railway
- Pre-grouping: North Eastern Railway
- Post-grouping: London and North Eastern Railway

Key dates
- 1847: opened
- 1970: closed
Location

Speeton railway station served the villages of Speeton and Reighton in North Yorkshire, England. It was situated on the Yorkshire Coast Line from Scarborough to Hull and was opened on 20 October 1847 by the York and North Midland Railway. It closed on 5 January 1970. The station building and the adjacent platform are still in place.

Preceding station	Historical railways	Following station
Bempton	Y&NMR; Hull and Scarborough Line	Hunmanby
