= Hunmanby railway station =

Railway station in North Yorkshire, England

Hunmanby
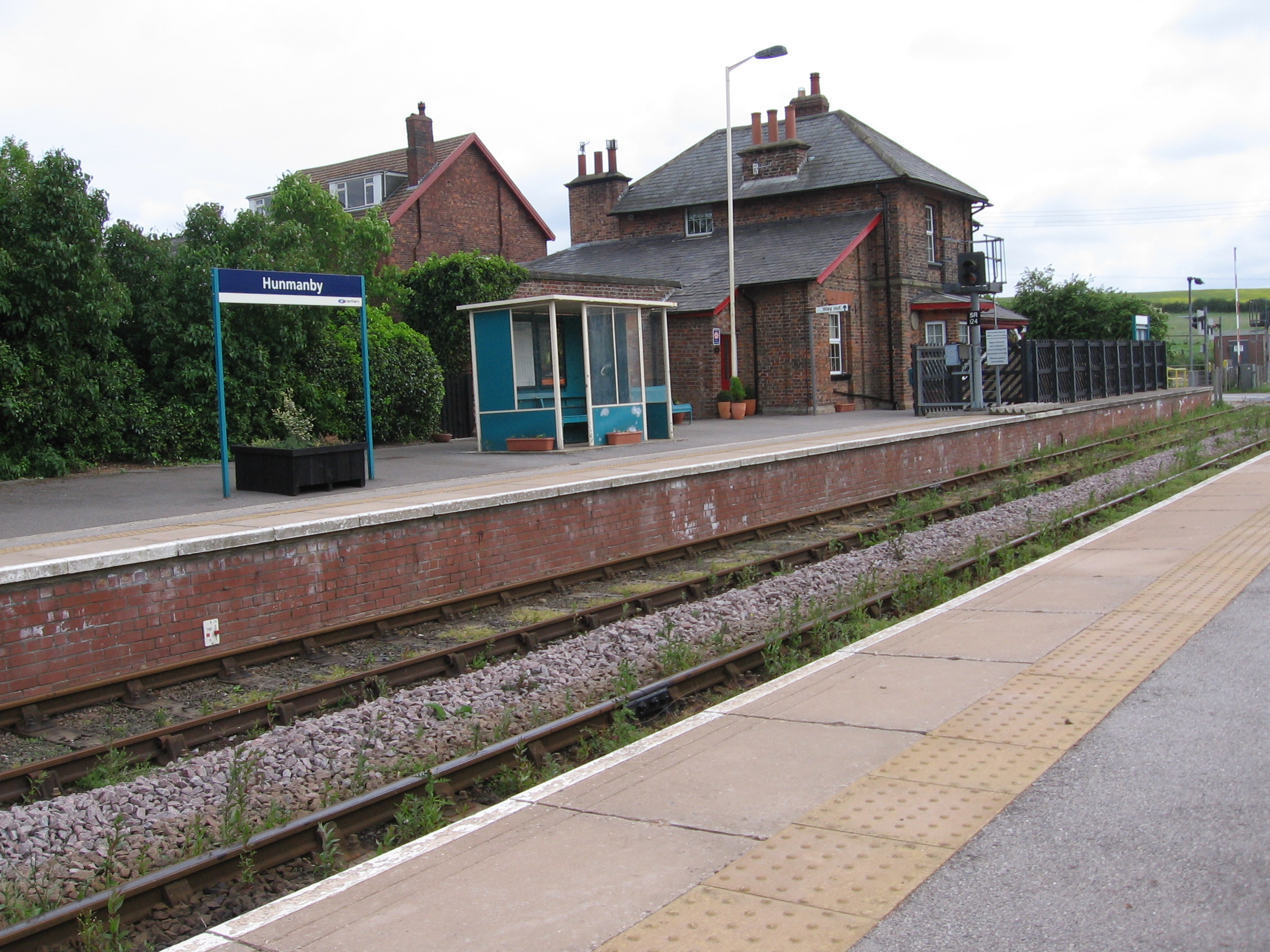

General information
- Location: Hunmanby, North Yorkshire; England
- Coordinates: 54.174000°N 0.314550°W
- Grid reference: TA101766
- Manager: Northern Trains
- Platforms: 2

Other information
- Station code: HUB
- Classification: DfT category F2

History
- Opened: 1847

Passengers
- 2021/22: ▲36,834
- 2022/23: ▲40,614
- 2023/24: ▼37,196
- 2024/25: ▲40,664
- 2025/26: ▲49,456
Location
Notes
- Passenger statistics from the Office of Rail and Road

Hunmanby railway station serves the large village of Hunmanby in North Yorkshire, England. It is located on the Yorkshire Coast Line and is operated by Northern Trains who provide all passenger train services. The station opened for traffic on 20 October 1847 and is the point at which the single track section from Bridlington ends, the line being double north of here towards Filey.

As originally built, the line was double throughout but the section to Bridlington was singled as an economy measure in 1973. Further modernisation work saw the signal box here abolished and removed in 2000, with the level crossing automated and remaining semaphore signals replaced by colour lights operated remotely from Seamer.

The station is unstaffed and passengers must purchase their ticket on the train. The station buildings remain and are now privately occupied - the main waiting room and the separate ladies' waiting room having been converted to holiday accommodation. Step-free access is available to both platforms via the automatic level crossing at the south end, whilst train running information can be obtained from timetable posters or telephone.

Local initiatives, such as door-to-door delivery of timetables in Hunmanby and surrounding villages, lead to a significant increase in patronage of this station between 2006 and 2008 and the increased number of passengers using this station has continued in subsequent years.

== Services ==
From the May 2019 timetable change, an hourly service operates each way until the evening (including Sundays). Most southbound trains run through to Sheffield via Doncaster.

Preceding station	National Rail	Following station
Bempton	Northern Trains Yorkshire Coast Line	Filey
Historical railways
Speeton Station closed; Line open	Y&NMR Hull to Scarborough Line	Filey
Disused railways
Terminus	London and North Eastern Railway Butlins Triangle	Filey Holiday Camp
