= Hull–Scarborough line =

Railway line in Yorkshire, England

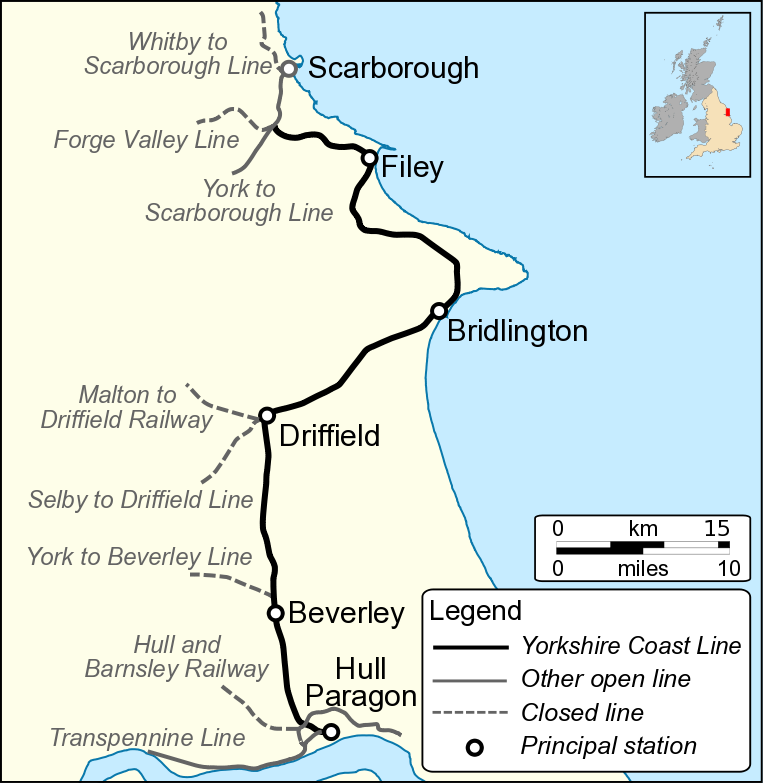
- Hull to Scarborough Line

Overview
- Other name: Yorkshire Coast Line
- Owner: Network Rail
- Locale: East Riding of Yorkshire; North Yorkshire; Yorkshire and the Humber; Kingston upon Hull

History
- Opened: 1845/46

Technical
- Track gauge: 4 ft 8 1/2 in (1,435 mm) standard gauge

The Hull–Scarborough line, also known as the Yorkshire Coast Line, is a railway line in Yorkshire, England that is used primarily for passenger traffic. It runs northwards from Hull Paragon via Beverley and Driffield to Bridlington, joining the York–Scarborough line at a junction near Seamer before terminating at Scarborough railway station.

The line was built in the 1840s, and formed by lines sanctioned by three separate acts: the southern part from a junction on the Hull and Selby Railway was a branch of that railway, and ran to Bridlington; the line from Bridlington to Seamer Junction was promoted by the York and North Midland Railway (Y&NMR); and the section from Seamer to Scarborough was part of the Y&NMR's York to Scarborough Line. The lines' route has been mostly unaltered since opening with the exception of the section into Hull which was modified soon after opening with the addition of about 5 miles (8 km) of track leading to the new Paragon station, which opened in 1848.

The line has been part of the Y&NMR, NER, LNER and British Railways. As of 2018, trains on the line are operated by Northern Trains.

== History ==
In the 1840s the Hull and Selby Railway (H&S) was promoting a branch line to Bridlington, and planning other branches in the East Riding – in the same period the York and North Midland Railway (Y&NMR) were planning a branch to the town from their line to Scarborough. This, and a desire to control the H&S's main line into Hull led the Y&NMR to seek and obtain a lease on the H&S.

Acts allowing the construction of the H&S's and Y&NMR's branches were passed by Parliament on the same day, 23 June 1845; (Note: Hull and Selby Railway (Bridlington Branch) Act 1845 "An Act for making a Branch Railway from the Hull and Selby Railway to Bridlington, and for other Purposes relating to the Hull and Selby Railway." (8 & 9 Vict. c. li). Passed 23 June, received royal assent 30 June.) (Note: York and North Midland Railway (Bridlington Branch) Act 1845 "An Act for enabling the York and North Midland Railway Company to make a Branch Railway from the Line of the York and Scarborough Railway, in the Township of Seamer, to Bridlington." (8 & 9 Vict. c. lviii), 23 June 1845.) and the lease of the H&S to the Y&NMR came into effect on 1 July 1845. (Note: The lease and potential acquisition of the Hull and Selby was formalised by the Hull and Selby Railway Company's Purchase Act 1846 (9 & 10 Vict. c. ccxli) in July 1846. See Hull and Selby Railway §(1845–54)) A connection between the Hull–Bridlington and Bridlington–Seamer lines was obtained by exploiting the maximum deviations of the submitted plans.

=== Construction ===
==== Seamer to Scarborough ====
The York and North Midland Railway (Y&NMR) opened a 42 1/4-mile (68 km) line from York to Scarborough on 7 July 1845. The section from Seamer to Scarborough forms the last part of the coastal line from Hull, with the branch connecting at Seamer junction. (Note: 54.23632°N 0.42196°W, Seamer junction) As built the only station on the section was the pre-existing Scarborough station.

==== Hull and Selby Railway (Bridlington branch) ====
The Hull–Bridlington line had been surveyed in 1844 by William Bailey Bray, who estimated a cost of £190,000 for a single-track line. Because the region was practically level, the planned line crossed roads on the level, instead of the usual bridge required; this aspect required examination by committee during the process of obtaining parliamentary permission.

Hull and Selby Railway (Bridlington Branch) Act 1845
- Act of Parliament
- Parliament of the United Kingdom
- Long title: An Act for making a Branch Railway from the Hull and Selby Railway to Bridlington, and for other Purposes relating to the Hull and Selby Railway.
- Citation: 8 & 9 Vict. c. li

Dates
- Royal assent: 30 June 1845

The Hull and Selby Railway (Bridlington Branch) Act 1845 (8 & 9 Vict. c. li) was obtained on 23 June 1845 giving permission to build the "Hull and Selby Railway (Bridlington Branch)", enabling a line from Hull to Bridlington of 31 miles (50 km). The 1845 act allowed the raising of £216,000 by shares, and a further £72,000 by loans. The Hull and Selby Railway Company's Purchase Act 1846 (9 & 10 Vict. c. ccxli) increased the amount of capital that could be raised.

By July 1845 Hull and Selby was leased to the York and North Midland, but was responsible for constructing the Bridlington branch line, as a result a joint committee was formed of directors of both businesses. Three contracts for the line's construction were tendered, separated at Driffield and Beverley; all were given to "Thomas Jackson and Alfred Bean" (Jackson and Bean, cumulative value £93,534). The line's construction was simple on predominately flat land, with road crossings on the level, and with the only significant river crossing being on the River Hull (or West Beck, Driffield Trout stream, or Eastburn Beck) well upstream, at Driffield; the river bridge was crossed by a four-arched bridge of low height. (Note: 53.99490°N 0.43758°W, River Hull bridge) Construction of stations and other buildings was contracted (for three sections) to Simminson & Hutchinson, Brown and Hall, and Samuel Atack, at a total of £73,580. The original junction with the Hull and Selby Railway allowed trains to run into Manor House Street station. (Note: The 1845 junction was east of Dairycoates outside Hull. (Note: 53.72850°N 0.37443°W, Junction with Hull and Selby Railway (1846)) Additional junctions were added c. 1848 as part of the lines built for the new Paragon Station. One chord allowed trains to run eastward (e.g. to or from Selby). (Note: 53.72460°N 0.39520°W, Hessle West junction (1848)) (Note: 53.73276°N 0.38184°W, Hessle Road junction (1848)) Two further junctions on the Bridlington branch gave access from north and south to the line into Paragon. (Note: 53.75616°N 0.39174°W, Cottingham junction (1848)) (Note: 53.73323°N 0.38191°W, Hessle Road junction (North)) Sources: Addyman & Fawcett (2013, p. 15); London Gazette (21 November 1846); Ordnance Survey, Sheets 226 240 (1853). see also Paragon railway station.)

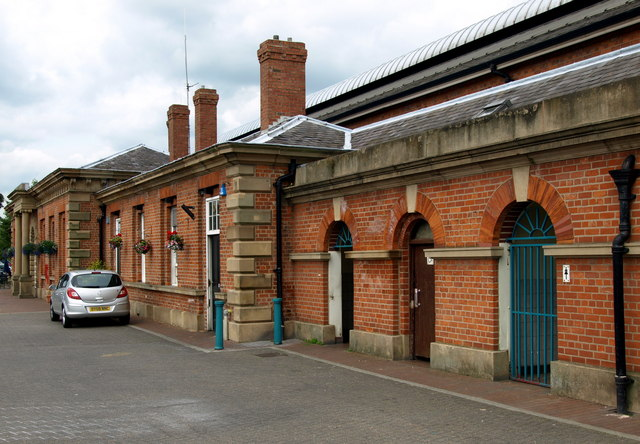
Beverley station frontage (2008)

The buildings on the line were designed by G. T. Andrews. All buildings were built of brick, with some stone detailing. The main stations on the section were Beverley, Driffield, and Bridlington; the stations consisted of a two platform train shed supporting an overall roof, with hipped ends, supported by an iron truss construction; (Note: The hipped ends were supported on a rectangular iron structure, with double internal lenticular trussing.) the main station buildings were built parallel and abutting to one wall of the trainshed, single storeyed, and of an approximately symmetrically appearance; the main entrance was central. The general large station designs include one or more water tanks on the platform raised on brick structures containing men's toilets.

Bridlington and Driffield had columned stone entrance porticos. Beverley was built with a 60 feet (18 m) double span trainshed, supported in the middle by cast iron columns. Bridlington also had a two road engine shed and turntable. Smaller stations were generally built at the crossing of a main road and the railway, with a two-storey station house incorporating both living accommodation and railway facilities; the station houses generally had a columned entrance portico, or a slab fronted stone doorcase at one entrance. Cottingham station was intermediate in design, with an office range as at the larger stations, with attached station master's house, but without a trainshed.

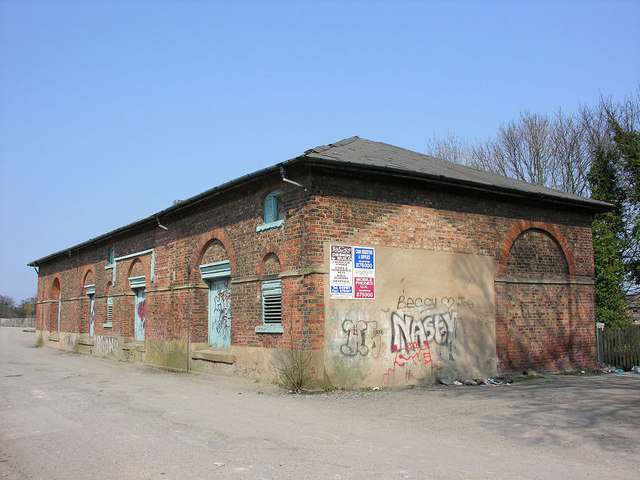
Goods shed at Cottingham (2007)

The station complexes also included goods sheds at the larger stations and at Cottingham and Hutton Cranswick. Andrew's standard design included a through track on one side, with an interior wooden platform and "cart docks" (raised exits) on the far side. The roofs were also hipped as at the station, but with wooden trusses; architectural detailing included round headed arched exits and entrances and matching diocletian windows. The goods shed roofs were extended beyond the main building on cast iron columns, extending the covered area.

Curiosities of the terms agreed with landowners included the provision of a station at Lockington for Baronet Hotham, together with a carriage and horse box for his use; and that the H&S should not compete in the sale of coal at Lockington and surrounding area; Lord Hotham had interests in the Aike (Coal) Beck a navigable tributary of the River Hull with a wharf at Lockington. The line had coal depots at other larger station sites.

The Hull to Bridlington section opened on 6 October 1846. The line left the Hull and Selby line near Dairycoates outside the urban area of Hull, travelling north to Cottingham, then passing through Driffield before Bridlington. As built it was double track and also incorporated the then new telegraph system.

==== York and North Midland (Bridlington branch) ====
York and North Midland Railway (Bridlington Branch) Act 1845
- Act of Parliament
- Parliament of the United Kingdom
- Long title: An Act for enabling the York and North Midland Railway Company to make a Branch Railway from the Line of the York and Scarborough Railway, in the Township of Seamer, to Bridlington.
- Citation: 8 & 9 Vict. c. lviii

Dates
- Royal assent: 30 June 1845

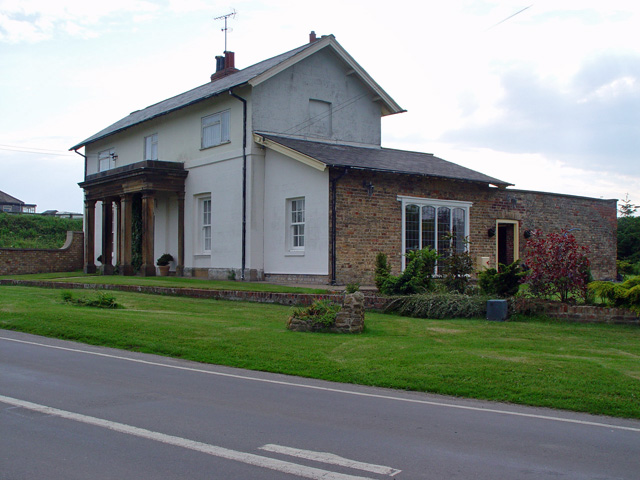
Porticoed station building at Bempton (2008)

The branch from Seamer to Bridlington was surveyed by John Cass Birkinshaw, who estimated a cost of £87,000. The York and North Midland Railway (Bridlington Branch) Act 1845 (8 & 9 Vict. c. lviii) was passed on 23 June 1845, enabling a branch of 19.75 miles (32 km) from Seamer to Bridlington.

Construction of the line was let in two contracts, divided at Filey; both were let to Richard and Joseph Crawshaw, who bid £31,227 and £90,669 for the northern and southern sections. The contract for the line's buildings was given to Atack, at a cost of £13,167.

The route passed over hilly ground of the Yorkshire Wolds, passing Bempton, Hunmanby and close to Filey from Bridlington to Seamer. The 13.25-mile (21.32 km) Filey-Bridlington section was double tracked as built, and included gradients of up to 1 in 92, with one section with a minimum curve of 35 chains (2,300 ft; 700 m); the section had 18 brick bridges some with stone imposts, and two girder bridges with spans of 46.5 and 27 feet (14.2 and 8.2 m). The section from Seamer to Filey was 6.5 miles (10.5 km) in length, and without any significant obstacles – there were no bridges required on the section.

The section's buildings were to a similar design to those on the Hull–Bridlington section, with Filey station the only 'large' station design on the route. (See § Bridlington branch.)

The Seamer to Filey section opened on 5 October 1846, with a celebration and dinner taking place in Filey. The final link from Bridlington to Filey opened on 20 October 1847, the section west of Hunmanby had required extensive earthwork. (Note: Tomlinson (1915, p. 486) gives a date of 18 October for the opening)

=== Openings (1846) ===
The Hull–Bridlington section opened on 6 October 1846. A train of 44 carriages arrived in Hull together with George Hudson and other directors, another 22 coaches were attached and the train set, propelled by the engines Hudson, Antelope and Aerial of the Railway Foundry, Leeds. A luncheon for over 900 took place in the Bridlington goods station. The main party then returned to Hull where a grand banquet took place.

Initially five trains per day were run between Hull and Bridlington, with the journey taking around two hours. The rates of passage were 3d, 2d and 1 1/2d per mile respectively for first-, second- and third-class passengers.

The Seamer–Filey section was opened on 5 October 1846, with a procession followed by a dinner at Filey, attended by George Hudson, J. H. Lowther, the Lord Mayor of York, F. Trench and others at the house of Mr. Bentley (Ravine Villa). The Bridlington–Filey section opened 20 October 1847.

=== History (1846–present) ===
Originally the Hull terminus was at Manor House Street station (Railway Street) next to Humber Dock; from Hull trains travelled first west along the Hull to Selby line before turning north at Dairycoates.

A new Hull terminus at Paragon Street (Paragon station) opened in 1848; as part of the works chords were constructed connecting the terminus to the Bridlington branch, as well as a westward chord at the original Hull and Selby/Bridlington branch junction. The original Dairycoates to Cottingham section remained in use, being used for freight, and as a cut off avoiding Hull for trains to Bridlington from West Yorkshire. In 1851 a branch was opened from Bridlington station to Bridlington harbour; it was out of use by 1866. (Note: 54.08439°N 0.19892°W, Junction for Bridlington Harbour branch (1851))

The Malton and Driffield Junction Railway opened 1853, connecting at Driffield junction south-west of the station. (Note: 53.99983°N 0.43646°W, Driffield junction (1853, Malton line)) In 1865 the Beverley to Market Weighton line was opened, connecting at a junction north of Beverley station. (Note: 53.85013°N 0.42402°W, Beverley junction (1865, Market Weighton line))

In the second half of the 19th century rail connected facilities at Beverley and Driffield substantially increased, with additional goods sheds, as well as independent firms operating alongside the railway with connected sidings – agriculture related industries were the norm, with the large East Riding Maltkilns, built 1873–4 at Beverley, and the Driffield and East Riding Pure Linseed Cake Company, founded 1861 in Driffield, amongst others.

In 1869 the only parts of the line to have block signalling were the junctions at Seamer and Beverley, and at the two termini. In the early 1870s, following serious accidents due to human error in setting points, the NER began to introduce point interlocking on all its lines. The work on the Hull–Scarborough line was completed by 1875.

Ticket platforms were provided at Beverley, Driffield and Filey from the 1860s to around the 1890s.

In 1885 the Scarborough and Whitby Railway opened, which connected via a short tunnel under Falsgrave Road (Falsgrave tunnel) to the line south out of Scarborough at a junction leading southward; (Note: 54.27575°N 0.41049°W, Junction for Falsgrave tunnel (c. 1885)) trains on the line terminated in Scarborough station after reversing. In around 1904 a junction was made for a short siding to the Mill Dam pumping station north of Cottingham. (Note: 53.79083°N 0.40776°W, Junction for Mill Dam pumping station siding (1890)) Bridlington gained a new three road engine shed and 50 feet (15 m) turntable in 1892.

In June 1908 an additional station in Scarborough opened, the Scarborough Excursion station, later known as Scarborough Londesborough Road. The station was intended to ease congestion at Scarborough station and on the track leading to it. The main feature was a single through platform and a large concourse for the marshalling of passengers. The station's siting allowed trains to travel without reversing to or from carriage sidings on the Scarborough–Whitby line north of the Falsgrave tunnel which had been built at around the same time.

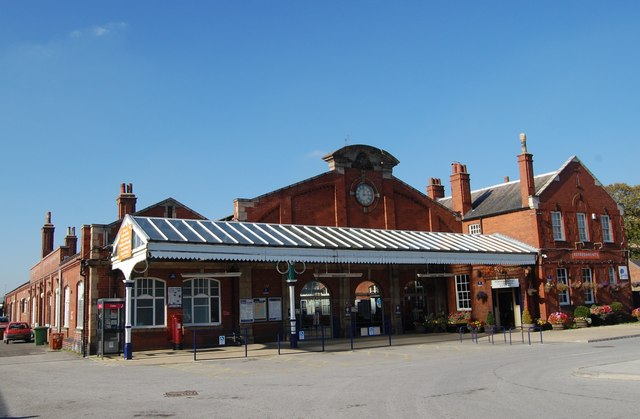
Bridlington station 1912 building (left, centre), with 1922 refreshment rooms (right) (2011)

Bridlington station had been extended in 1873, and 1892, and in 1911–12 was extensively remodelled with the addition of new platforms and a station concourse and new offices. An additional building for refreshment rooms was added alongside the concourse in 1922–23. Structural problems with Driffield station's roof led it to being replaced with steel awnings in 1904; the roof at Beverley station was replaced with a single span design in 1908.

First World War requirements for railway track for use in France led to the singling of the line sections between Flamborough and Bempton, and Speeton and Hunmanby in 1917. The sections were then worked by the Electric Token Tablet Block system. The line was redoubled in 1923.

In 1947 a short branch section opened to Filey Holiday Camp, accessible from up and down directions via a triangle of track. (Note: 54.18544°N 0.30727°W, Junction for Filey Holiday Camp branch (1947, South)) (Note: 54.18944°N 0.30242°W, Junction for Filey Holiday Camp branch (1947, North)) Cayton station closed in 1952, Gristhorpe station in 1959, and Lockington station in 1960. Services to Scarborough Londesborough Road station ended in 1963.

The Driffield to Malton line closed in 1958, and, following the Beeching report of 1963 the Driffield–Market Weighton line and the Beverley–Market Weighton and its continuation to York closed in 1965. Freight work at all minor stations, including Filey, ceased in 1964; freight service to Cottingham and Nafferton ended in 1970 and 1976.

The line itself was not listed for closure in the Beeching report but several stations had too little passenger activity to be viable, whilst the larger stations had large amounts of freight and passenger traffic. By 1966 passenger figures had fallen after the connecting lines had closed, and the line was examined for closure; the line was losing £150,000 per year on revenues of £200,000. Partial singling and de-manning were suggested, including the installation of automatic level crossings. The Transport Act 1968 allowed subsidies for railways in case of a social need, and the line was found to fit this case. By 1969 the subsidy required had risen to over £600,000 per year – the decision was made to keep the line open, though a number of poorly utilised stations were to be closed. Lowthorpe station, Burton Agnes station, Carnaby station, Flamborough railway station (before 1884 "Marton"), and Speeton railway stations closed to passengers in 1970.

The Bridlington–Hunmanby section was singled in 1973. Conversion of level crossings to unstaffed 'Automatic Open' type was under way in the 1980s, but was halted by the Lockington rail crash. Subsequently, following a report into level crossing safety in 1987 the policy changed to replacement with 'Automatic Half Barrier' type. At the main stations goods traffic had been in decline since the 1930s, with closures in the second half of the 20th century; Bridlington's coal supplied gasworks closed in 1968, its coal depots c. 1976, and the remainder of goods services in the early 1980s; goods trains to Beverley and Driffield ended in 1985. Additionally Filey Holiday Camp station and the associated spur closed in 1977. The Filey–Seamer section was singled in 1983.

==== Passenger services ====
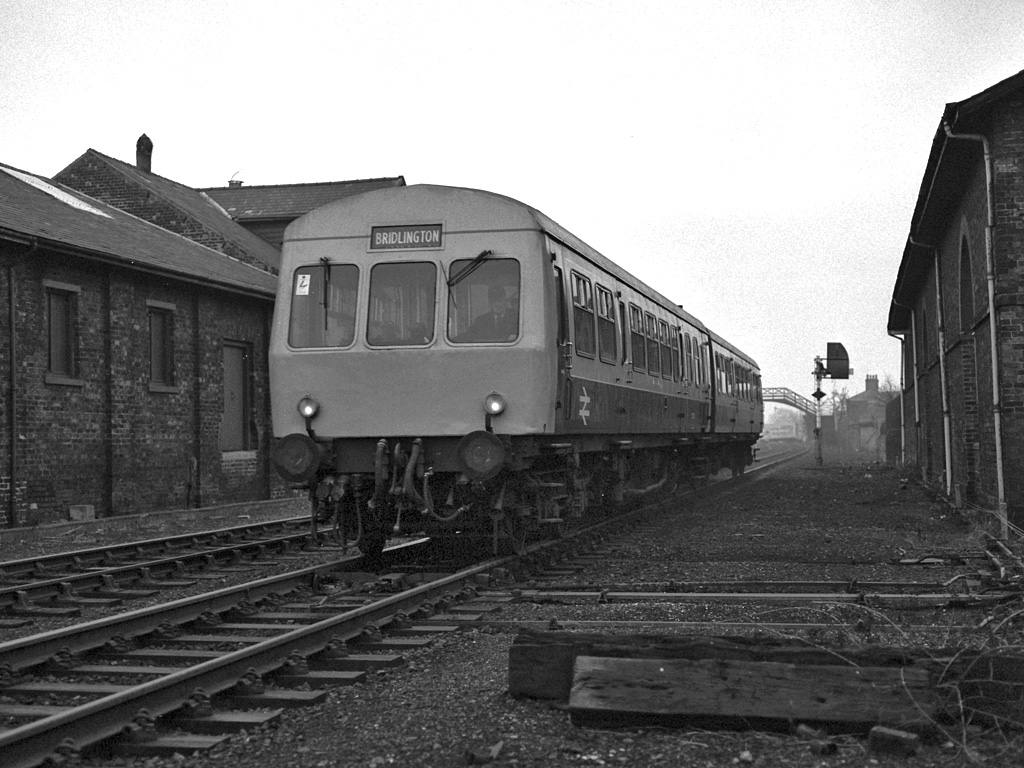
Class 101 DMU at Beverley (1982)

Initially the Hull–Bridlington service was five trains each way per day, with a journey time of 2 hours. By 1851 four trains per day were running to Scarborough, with a journey time of 2 hrs 45 mins. In 1861 additional services had been introduced running from Hull to Beverley, Driffield and Bridlington, followed by the return journey. By 1880 the number of trains from Hull to Scarborough had increased to six, with nine short returns to Beverley. A third class ticket to Bridlington cost 2s 6d (around 1d per mile), whilst train times were unimproved since 1860.

By 1900 a non-stop Hull–Bridlington service had been introduced, taking 40 or 45 minutes (around 40 mph average). In 1914 there were eight or more Hull–Scarborough trains per day, and over thirty daily services from Hull to Beverley. By 1930 the Hull–Scarborough stopping train took 2 hours 15 minutes. Railcars from the Sentinel Waggon Works were introduced in 1930. The 1949 timetable had added eight trains to the Filey Holiday Camp to Newcastle, Sheffield, London, York, Birmingham, and Leeds.

In the second half of the 20th century diesel multiple units were introduced. By 2000 there were half-hourly trains to Bridlington and approximately hourly Scarborough trains. The Hull–Bridlington stopping service took 48 minutes, and the Hull–Scarborough service 1 hour and 23 minutes.

=== The Newington branch (1848–1965) ===
The Newington branch, (also known as the Cottingham branch) ran between Hessle Road and Cottingham South junctions. It was an original length of the Hull–Bridlington line that became isolated in 1848 after the creation of lines into Paragon station. After 1848 the line was singled and used as a goods line for the Scarborough branch; it also served the Springhead pumping station via a branch at Waterworks junction on Spring Bank West in Hull. (Note: The connection to Springhead waterworks was lost c. 1885 when the Hull and Barnsley Railway was built. The waterworks was later supplied via a branch of the H&BR near its Springhead locomotive works. (Ordnance Survey. 240NW 1906–8) (See also Hull and Barnsley Railway § Hull to Springhead.))

In around 1896 a station halt Newington Excursion Station was built. Legend states that the halt has it origins in a halt built for the wife of a local timber merchant, which allowed her to detrain only a 1/4 mile (0.4 km) from her home; In the late 1890s the North Eastern Railway management were undertaking quadrupling of the Selby–Hull line, and looking for means to reduce the congestion out of Hull – it was suggested to redouble the line allowing additional freight to run from Hull via Cottingham to the Market Weighton and beyond. The construction of an unloading platform was also authorised, allowing livestock to be unloaded for the Yorkshire Agricultural show which was being held in Hull in 1900.

In the early 1900s the station was also used to drop passengers travelling to the Hull Fair. Services at the station ended around the First World War. The line was used to allow trains travelling east along the Hull and Selby to continue north along the Bridlington line without passing through Hull such as summer passenger trains running from west of Hull to the seaside resorts on the end of the Bridlington line.

From around 1900 the Chalk lane sidings expanded, branching both left and right immediately north of Hessle Road junction. (Note: Established in c. 1880.) The entire branch was closed in 1965. (Note: The Hull avoiding function was replaced by a new chord near Victoria crossing on the lines into Paragon station. Hoole (1986, p. 49))

=== Incidents ===
- On 17 September 1947 a passenger train from Hull collided with an army truck which had crashed through the gates at Burton Agnes level crossing. The collision resulted in the deaths of seven German prisoners of war, and two British service men, plus the serious injury of ten more people, three of whom later died.
- On 25 August 1956 an empty train of coaches ran into Filey Holiday Camp railway station due to a human failure to connect the brake pipes, resulting in the engine, a LNER Class K3 ending on the station platform.
- Lockington rail crash. On 26 July 1986, a Hull-bound diesel multiple unit collided with a Ford Escort van on the unguarded level crossing. Eight passengers were killed and 32 were injured. A boy of 11 in the van also died.

== Description ==
=== Route ===
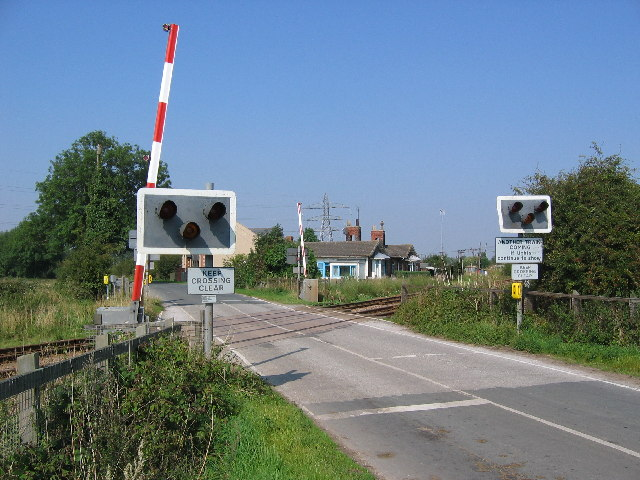
'Automatic half barrier' type level crossing at Beverley Parks, with former railway cottages (2005)

The Hull to Scarborough line is a branch line railway running from Hull north through Cottingham, Beverley and Driffield, before turning north-east towards Bridlington. At Bridlington the line turns roughly north-west towards Scarborough via Filey, making a junction with the York–Scarborough line at Seamer approximately 2 miles (3.2 km) outside Scarborough.

As of 2009 the line is used primarily for passenger traffic. Signalling and safety systems on both sections included track circuit and absolute block signalling.

On the Hull–Seamer section loading gauge is W6; route availability varies from RA6 to RA8; typical linespeed is 70 mph for Hull–Bridlington, and 60 mph for Bridlington–Seamer. The line is double track excluding the sections Bridlington–Hunmanby and Filey–Seamer, with a 3-mile (4.8 km) section of double track between. There are 99 level crossings on the Hull–Seamer section. On the Seamer–Scarborough (York–Scarborough line) the loading gauge is W6, and the route availability 8.

=== Stations ===
The line has station stops at the following stations (south to north): Hull Paragon–Cottingham–Beverley–Arram–Hutton Cranswick–Driffield–Nafferton–Bridlington–Bempton–Hunmanby–Filey–Seamer–Scarborough

Many of the stations and other railway structures, are now listed. Cottingham railway station, the adjoining station masters house, and the goods shed are listed buildings; as are Beverley station and signal box; the station house at Hutton Cranswick; the station, goods shed, and signal box at Nafferton; the signal box and station house at Burton Agnes; and Bridlington, Flamborough and Filey stations.

=== Services ===
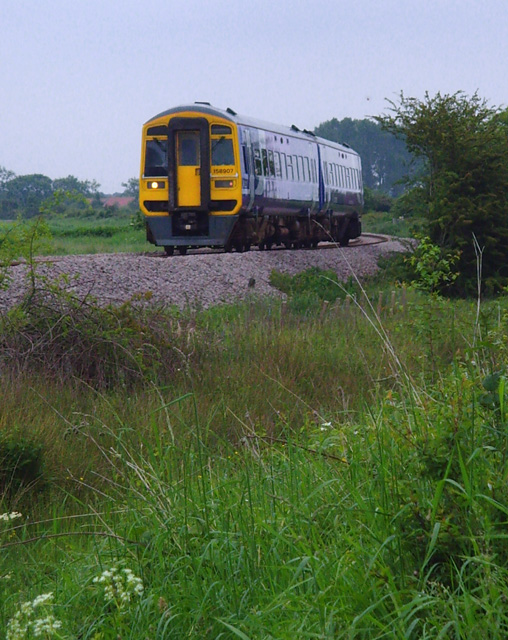
Northern Rail class 158 DMU near Leconfield (2008)

As of the May 2024 timetable change, there are now 15 trains each way to/from Scarborough along the Yorkshire Coast Line on Monday to Saturday, almost all of which start/terminate at Sheffield. There are 11 services to Scarborough and 12 services from Scarborough on Sundays, the majority of which run between Scarborough and Sheffield. Hourly Bridlington to York services (both ways) give a combined service of 2 trains per hour (tph) between Bridlington and Hull on Monday to Saturday. In all cases, this provides the most intensive service ever on the line. Services which start/terminate at Scarborough are also now predominantly worked by refurbished three-coach Class 170 Turbostar trains. Services which start/terminate at Bridlington are predominantly worked by two-coach Class 155 trains. Class 158 units are also semi-regularly seen in operation on the line.
