= Scarborough Londesborough Road railway station =

Disused railway station in North Yorkshire, England

Scarborough Londesborough Road
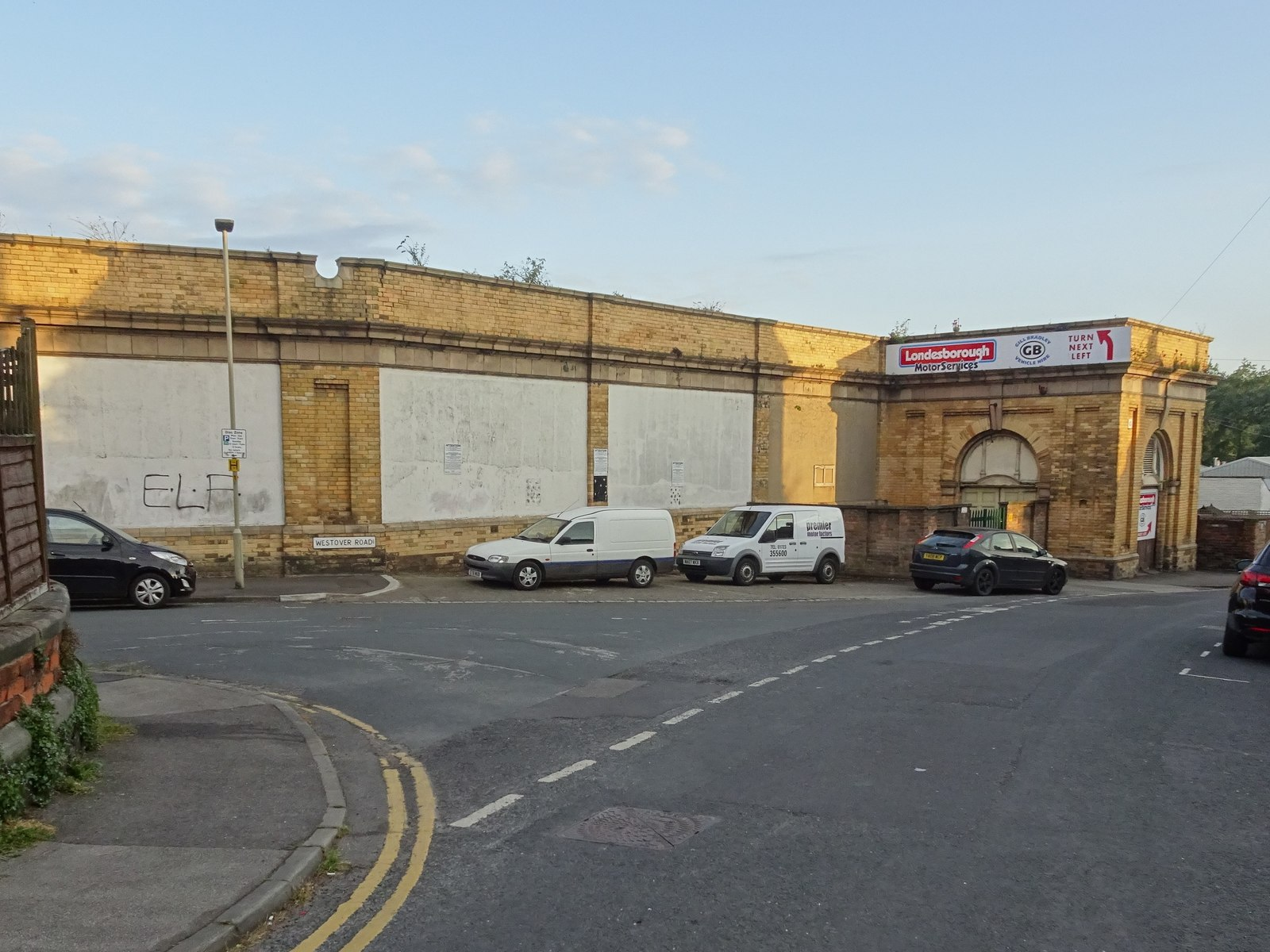
- Former station building (2018)

General information
- Location: Scarborough, North Yorkshire; England
- Coordinates: 54.275114°N 0.410500°W
- Grid reference: TA034877

Other information
- Status: Disused

History
- Original company: North Eastern Railway
- Pre-grouping: North Eastern Railway
- Post-grouping: London and North Eastern Railway

Key dates
- 8 June 1908: opened
- 1 June 1933: renamed and upgraded to a public station
- 25 August 1963: closed for passengers
- 4 July 1966: closed completely
Location

Scarborough Londesborough Road railway station, originally called Washbeck Excursion Station, was built as an excursion station to ease operating pressure at Scarborough Central in the holiday resort of Scarborough. The site chosen was the old engine shed location to the south of Scarborough Central railway station, and the engine shed were moved further south. It had a through and a bay platform, and was typically only used on Saturdays, Sundays and Bank Holidays. Excursion trains from all over the country could be routed into it rather than the main Central station to disembark their passengers before heading onwards to the Whitby branch line to be stabled in carriage sidings at Northstead/Gallows Close on the town's northern outskirts. Return services would follow the same route in the opposite direction to load up before departure.

It cost £7,635 (equivalent to £1,007,000 in 2023) and was opened on 8 June 1908 by the North Eastern Railway, but it was not advertised in public timetables until 1933, after it had been upgraded to a public station and was renamed. Ancillary works for the station included a new signal box and viaduct at Washbeck (just to the south) (£5,900), and 4 miles (6.4 km) of carriage sidings at Northstead (£4,000), meaning a grand total of £16,635 (equivalent to £2,194,000 in 2023). It had one through platform, at 300 yards (270 m) in length which could handle a 14-carriage train, and a south-facing end platform, at 250 yards (230 m) in length which could handle 11-carriage trains. No passenger rail services operated between the two stations (Londesbrough Road and Scarborough), and the only way for passengers to transfer between the two was via public roads. It was closed to passenger trains by British Railways on 25 August 1963, but remained in use for stabling coaching stock until its official closure on 4 July 1966.

The station building and the remains of the 14 coach long platform can still be seen from trains on the Yorkshire Coast Line and on the York to Scarborough section of the North TransPennine route on the west side of the tracks approaching Scarborough. However, most of the platform has been demolished due to the construction of a new service depot for TransPennine Express trains.

Preceding station	Historical railways	Following station
Seamer	Y&NMR; York to Scarborough Line	Terminus
