= Carnaby railway station =

Disused railway station in the East Riding of Yorkshire, England

Carnaby
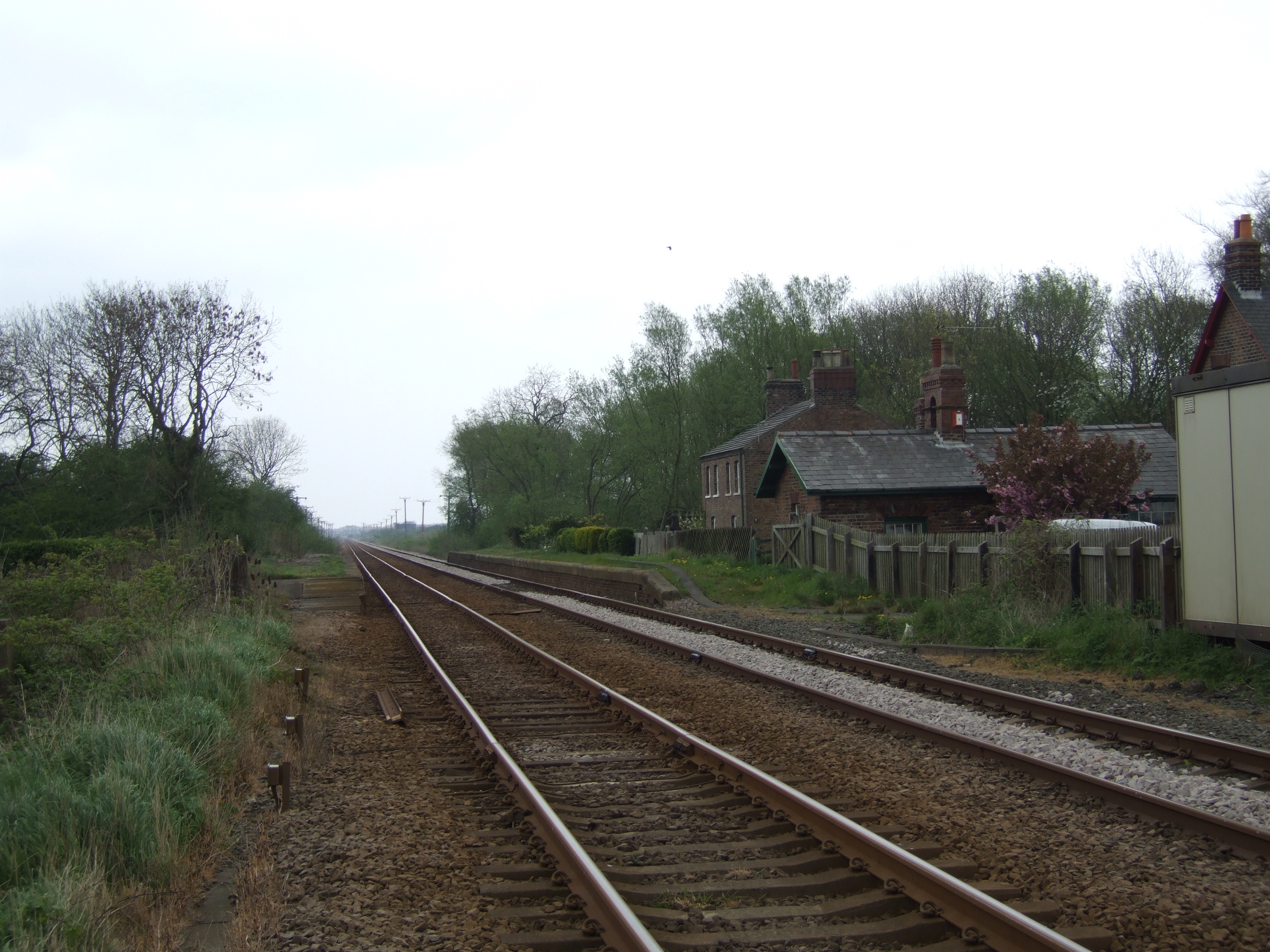
- Carnaby railway station in 2007

General information
- Location: Carnaby, East Riding of Yorkshire; England
- Coordinates: 54.067°N 0.245°W
- Grid reference: TA149649
- Platforms: 2

Other information
- Status: Disused

History
- Original company: York and North Midland Railway
- Pre-grouping: North Eastern Railway
- Post-grouping: London and North Eastern Railway

Key dates
- 7 October 1846: opened
- 5 January 1970: closed
Location

Carnaby railway station was a minor railway station serving the village of Carnaby on the Yorkshire Coast Line from Scarborough to Hull, England. The station probably opened on 7 October 1846 when the York and North Midland Railway opened the line between Hull and Bridlington.

The station was host to a camping coach from 1935 to 1939.

The station closed on 5 January 1970.

The western end of the station was to be the junction of the Bridlington and North Frodingham Light Railway. The act of parliament for this line was granted in 1898 under the Light Railways Act 1896. The line was to have been standard gauge and worked by steam locomotives throughout. The line was never built.

As of 2025, the two platforms are still visible and can be seen from the main road next to the station, however overgrown.

Preceding station	Historical railways	Following station
Burton Agnes; Station closed; Line open	Y&NMR; Hull and Scarborough Line	Bridlington
