= Primrose Valley =

Village in North Yorkshire, England

Coordinates: 54.1885°N 0.2875°W

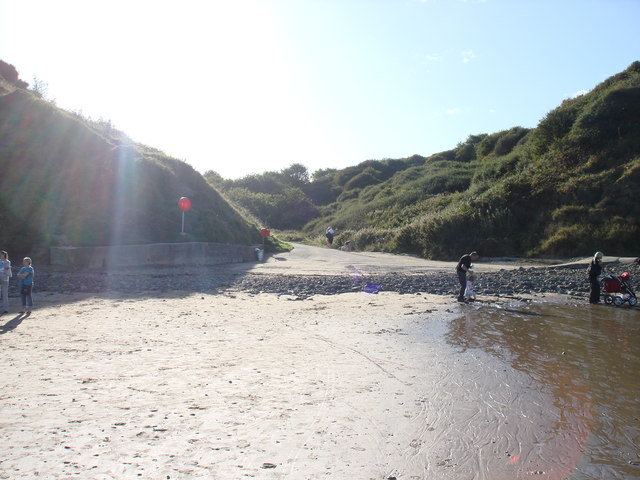
- Beach at Primrose Valley

- Location within North Yorkshire
- Population: 451
- OS grid reference: TA118783
- Civil parish: Filey
- Unitary authority: North Yorkshire
- Ceremonial county: North Yorkshire
- Region: Yorkshire and the Humber
- Country: England
- Sovereign state: United Kingdom
- Post town: FILEY
- Postcode district: YO14
- Dialling code: 01723
- Police: North Yorkshire
- Fire: North Yorkshire
- Ambulance: Yorkshire
- UK Parliament: Thirsk and Malton

Primrose Valley is a coastal village south of Filey, North Yorkshire, England.

It had a population of 451 in the 2011 census.

== History ==
In 1940 and 1941, pillbox bunkers were constructed along its coast for the Second World War.

Primrose Valley was historically part of the East Riding of Yorkshire until 1974. From 1974 to 2023 it was part of the Borough of Scarborough, and it is now administered by the unitary North Yorkshire Council.

== Tourism ==
Primrose Valley Holiday Park is a caravan park owned by Haven Holidays. The park is touted as one of their flagship parks, and as one of their largest. Part of the site was previously occupied by Butlin's Filey.
