= Bridlington railway station =

Railway station in the East Riding of Yorkshire, England

Bridlington
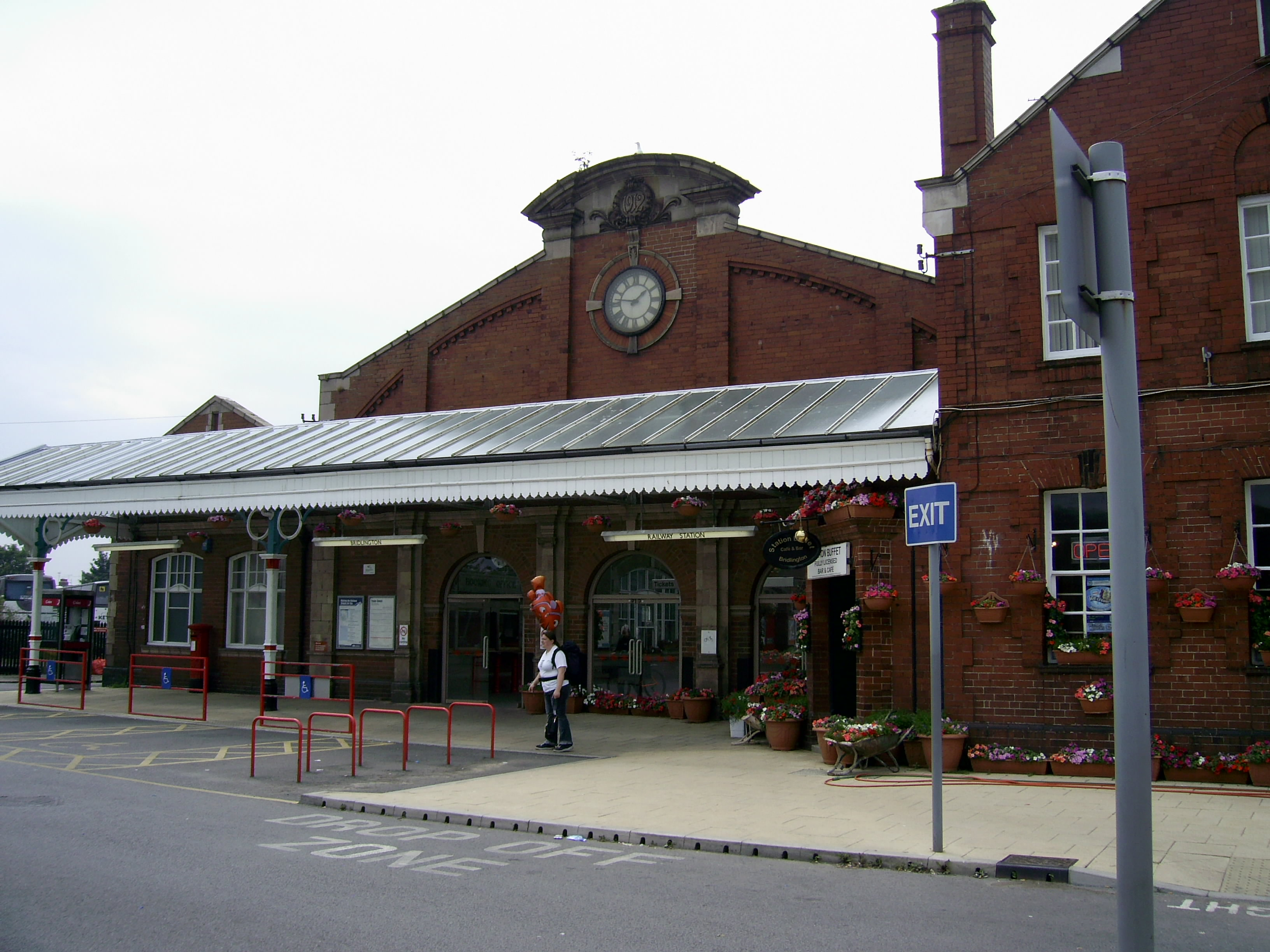

General information
- Location: Bridlington, East Riding of Yorkshire; England
- Coordinates: 54.0840°N 0.1985°W
- Grid reference: TA178668
- Manager: Northern
- Platforms: 3 (numbered 4-6)

Other information
- Station code: BDT
- Classification: DfT category D

History
- Original company: York and North Midland Railway
- Pre-grouping: North Eastern Railway
- Post-grouping: London and North Eastern Railway

Key dates
- 6 October 1846: opened

Passengers
- 2020/21: ▼0.144 million
- Interchange: ▼398
- 2021/22: ▲0.443 million
- Interchange: ▲1,557
- 2022/23: ▲0.505 million
- Interchange: ▼1,082
- 2023/24: ▼0.492 million
- Interchange: ▼1,055
- 2024/25: ▲0.546 million
- Interchange: ▲1,203
Location
Notes
- Passenger statistics from the Office of Rail and Road

Bridlington railway station serves the seaside town of Bridlington in the East Riding of Yorkshire, England. It is located on the Yorkshire Coast Line and is operated by Northern who provide all passenger train services.

== History ==
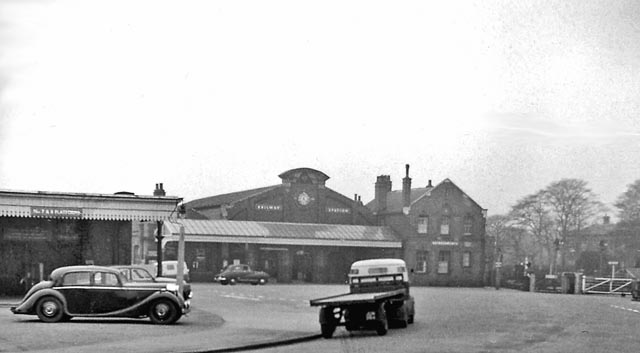
The station in 1961

The station was opened on 6 October 1846 by the York and North Midland Railway as the terminus of their line running from Hull railway station. An extension northwards to Filey railway station leading to a junction at Seamer railway station connecting with the York to Scarborough Line was opened just over a year later.

The original station buildings and platforms (numbered 1–3) were located a few yards to the west of the current station. These consisted of a train shed designed by George Townsend Andrews and similar to his work at Filey and Beverley. Platform 3 was an extension to the original scheme and was a bay platform used for many years by the 'Malton Dodger' until the 1950s. Bridlington expanded as a resort at the start of the 20th century largely as a result of the railway. Direct trains ran from the industrial heartlands via Selby and Market Weighton in the summer. The new holiday market led to a huge expansion of the resort and the need for a larger station to take the long excursion trains.

The present concourse and the main platforms date from the 1912 expansion of the station, which included Bell's wrought iron canopies over the lengthy platforms 5 and 6. A new roofed concourse was built and the new station entrance included the original canopy from the old entrance. After the First World War, excursion platforms were added to cope with the many special trains. On summer Saturdays, the timetable would include through trains to Leeds, London, the Midlands and Derbyshire. The inter-war period saw the greatest extent of the station, complete with engine shed and two turntables with extensive sidings. The fine compact Station Buffet was built at this time.

After the Second World War, the excursion market continued to thrive until the early 1960s, particularly with the opening of Butlin's at Filey which had its own station. After the Beeching closures of the Wolds' lines, excursions continued but the demand weakened. By the 1980s, rationalisation was overdue as many lines in the station were rarely used except on summer weekends. The timetable was changed to create a regular 30-minute clockface service south of Bridlington with fewer trains to Scarborough. A winter Sunday service was introduced south of Bridlington in the late 1980s.

Today's station is much changed from the extensive original and is a fragment. The original train sheds were removed and replaced by concrete canopies as at Driffield and Pickering during the late 1950s. These original platforms (Nos 1 and 2, used by northbound trains) were taken out of use in March 1983 and subsequently demolished (the site is now occupied by housing).

The excursion platforms on the opposite side (7 & 8) were taken out of regular use before signalling changes in 2000 that put the line northwards towards Filey & Scarborough under the control of the signal boxes at Bridlington South and Seamer, leaving only three platforms (4–6) in operation. Platform 8 was reinstated as a siding (i.e. not for passenger trains) for a time (2003-2007), but then abandoned once again. The buffers and most of the track in the platforms were removed on 1 September 2014 and the end was demolished some years later to make way for a Council project for a car park. The connection from the Up Excursion to the Up Main was severed on 30 September 2015.

The remaining part of the long island excursion platform was demolished in December 2020, and the land became part of a commercial retail development. A nine-day closure at the end of October 2021, swept away the 1912 track and signalling, although the signal box remains in use. The remains of the carriage sidings were recovered. The layout to the south of the station was simplified and moved to a new alignment. Platform 4 no longer allowed departures to the south, but Platform 5 was made bidirectional.,

Today's station has preserved the wide concourse and the sweeping curved platforms of the 1912 extension, and it has many floral displays.

The station was designated a Grade II listed building in 2003 and is now recorded in the National Heritage List for England, maintained by Historic England. The former goods shed, built at the same time and now in commercial use, was similarly awarded Grade II listed status in 2023.

The station was resignalled in 2021. In 2023, work began to install lifts at the station.

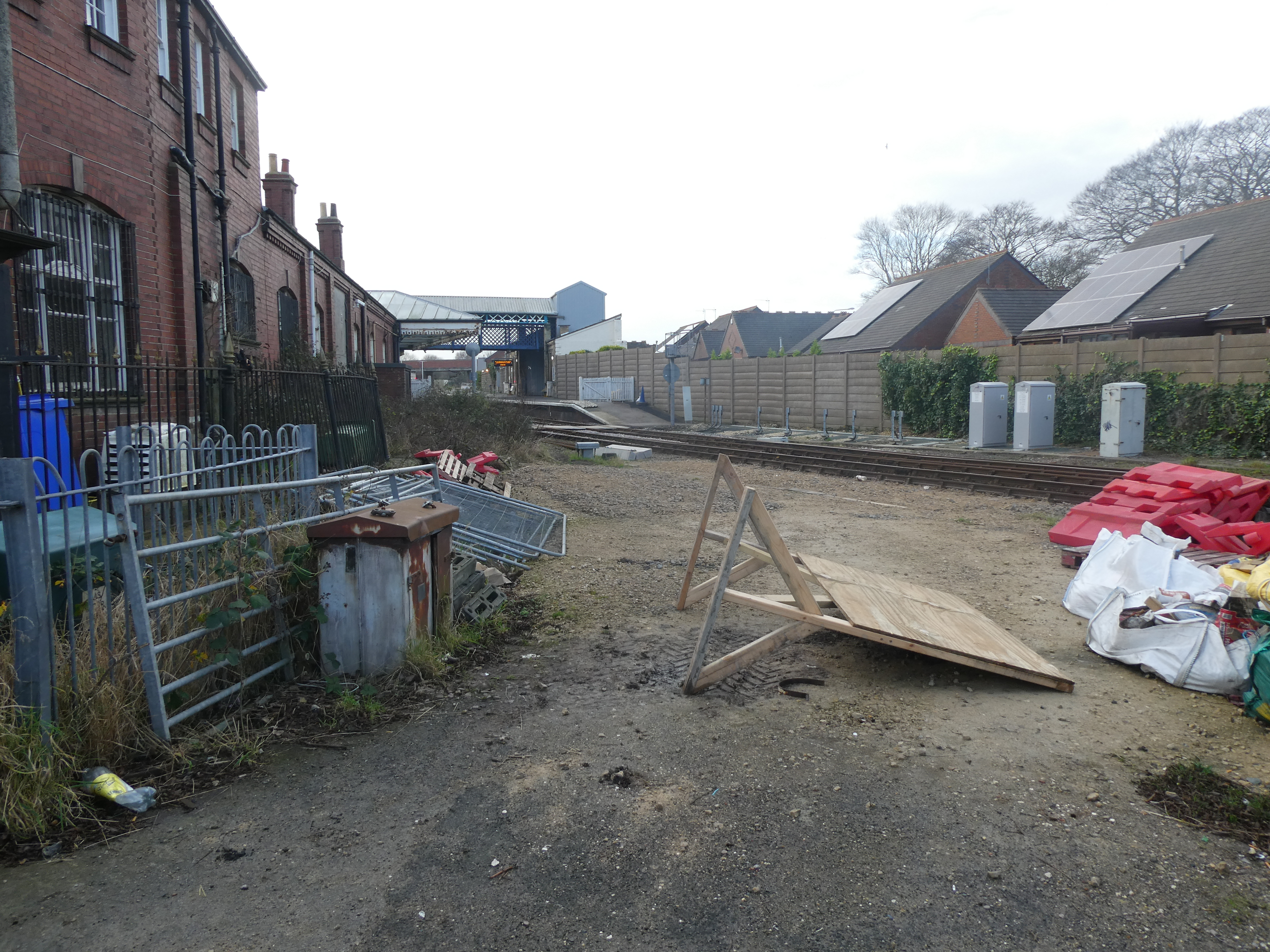
Bridlington Station post resignalling works

== Accidents and incidents ==
- In July 1958, locomotive No. 62703 Hertfordshire ran into the turntable pit and rolled into its side.

== Facilities ==
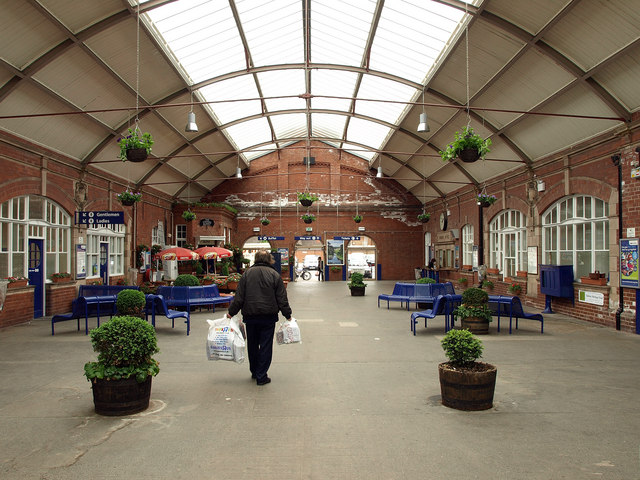
Bridlington railway station concourse

The station is staffed part-time, covering approximately 'shop hours'. Facilities include a waiting room, ticket office, lost property and car park. Wheelchair access is not complete due to a bridge to platform 4 (for Scarborough), meaning access to that platform is via a barrow crossing on the track which may require staff assistance. A revamped footbridge with lifts is due for completion by summer 2023.

A ticket-vending machine was installed on 26 January 2011, near to the Council Information Point inside the concourse.

Other parts of the building unused by the railway are now used for local interest groups – the parcel office is now an arts centre run by MIND mental health charity, and other parts of the building are used by Bridlington Model Railway Society.

A Selecta Vending Machine is also available on platform 5.

== Services ==
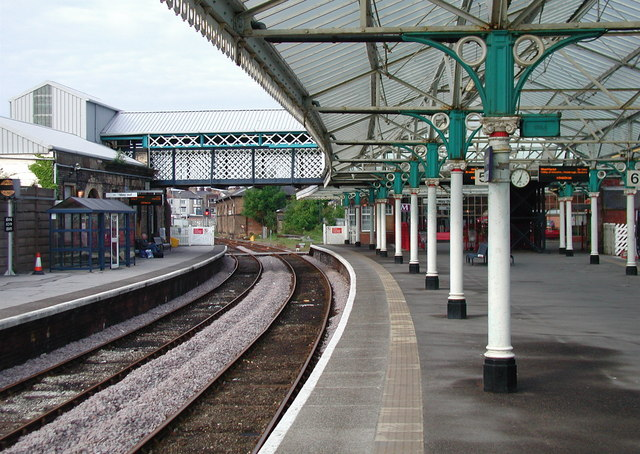
Station platforms

There is a twice-hourly service from the station to Hull on weekdays, with alternate departures continuing to Doncaster and Sheffield or York – some of these are limited stop either side of Hull, whilst others serve most intermediate stations en route. In general, the stopping pattern of the hourly Sheffield service is Bridlington, Driffield, Beverley, Cottingham, Hull, Brough, Goole, Doncaster, Meadowhall and Sheffield. The York trains serve all stops to Hull apart from Arram (which has a limited service). One evening service to Doncaster and Sheffield runs via Selby rather than Goole.

Northbound, there is now a basic hourly service to Scarborough all day (until 20:00) since the May 2019 timetable change. This is an improvement on the nine per day, each way frequency that formerly operated.

On Sundays, trains operate hourly to Hull and Scarborough from mid-morning throughout the year (rather than in summer only as before), with most of the Hull trains continuing to Sheffield via Doncaster. The new Sunday service is the first all-year-round, all line, Sunday train service since at least 1958.

The local Community Rail Partnership is hoping that service improvements, such as the year-round Sunday service and a weekday hourly service to Scarborough, can be implemented once Northern Rail receives additional rolling stock from the Department for Transport as part of a central government investment plan for the local rail network.

Northern Rail confirmed its intentions to institute an improved weekday and all-year Sunday service from December 2009 (subject to approval from the DfT). These changes were implemented with the start of the new timetable on 13 December 2009.

Northern are further upgrading services to/from the station, which come into effect with the May 2019 timetable change. This will see an hourly daytime service operating to and from Scarborough throughout the week. The December 2019 timetable change saw the introduction of a direct service to York via Hull.

Preceding station	National Rail	Following station
Nafferton	Northern Hull–Scarborough line	Bempton
Historical railways
Carnaby Station closed; Line open	Y&NMR Hull and Scarborough Line	Flamborough Station closed; Line open

=== Platforms ===
Bridlington station has currently 3 platforms (numbered 4–6).

- Platform 4 is for trains to Scarborough from Hull, Doncaster or Sheffield.
- Platform 5 is bidirectional for trains to or from Scarborough, Hull, Doncaster, Sheffield, Selby and York.
- Platform 6 is a bay platform for services terminating from Hull, Doncaster, Sheffield or York.

=== Locomotive hauled and heritage trains ===
Loco-hauled and steam trains are now permitted access to the line following a nine-day engineering blockade in February 2008 and February 2009 that saw more than 4 miles of track replaced.

On 25 July 2009 the first loco-hauled excursion for some years "The Bridlington Seaside Special" arrived from London King's Cross with Class 66 haulage. Western loco D1015 "Western Champion" visited on 5 December 2009 and a charter to Edinburgh ran on 18 December 2009. In 2010 a railtour to Carlisle began in Bridlington hauled by 2 Class 47 diesel locomotives. On 24 July the line was visited by a charter hauled by Class 67 locomotives.

== See also ==
- Listed buildings in Bridlington (Quay area)
