= Butlin's Filey =

Former holiday camp in Filey, North Yorkshire, England

Coordinates: 54.182°N 0.287°W

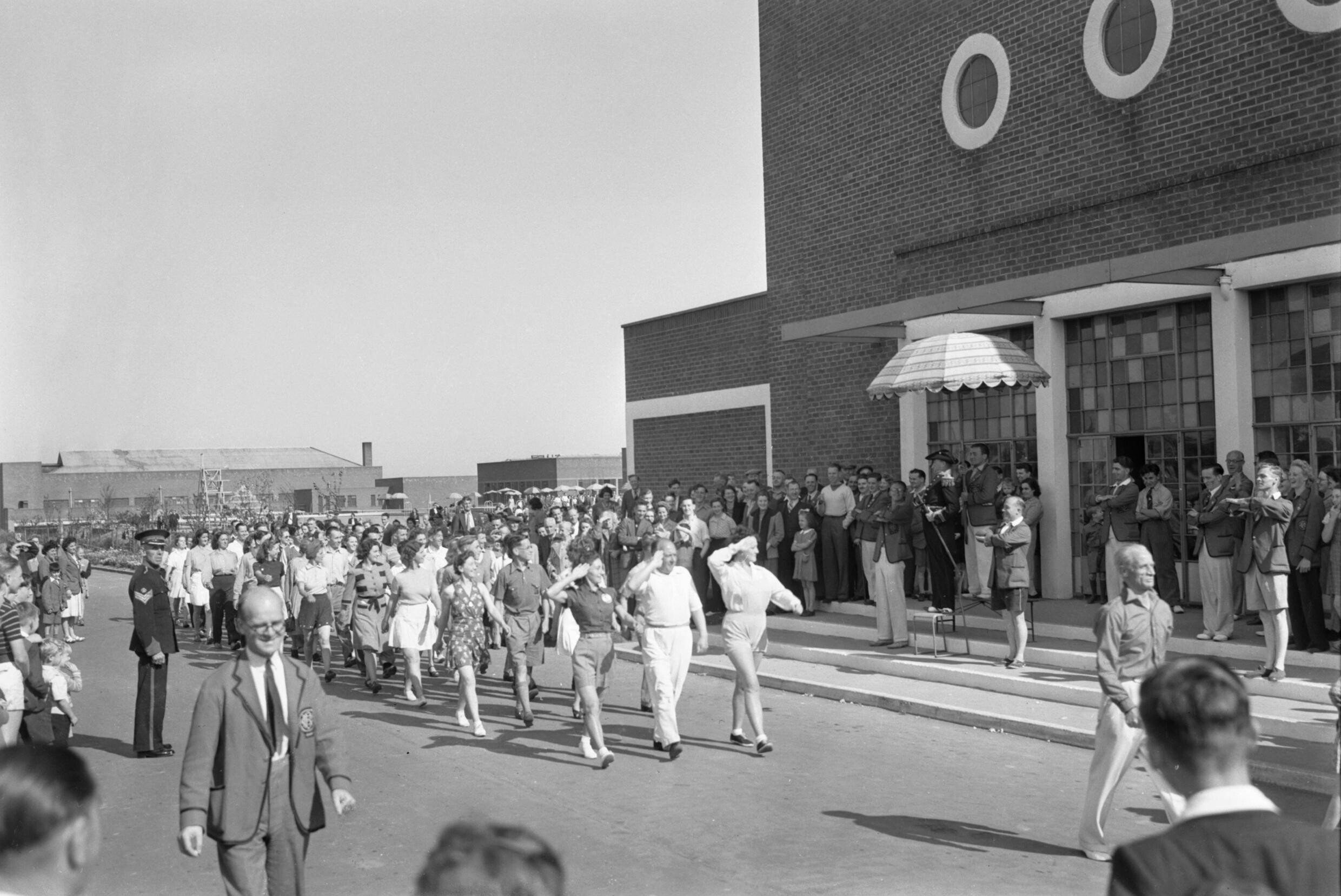
The camp after reopening in 1945

Filey Holiday Camp was a Butlin's holiday camp near Filey, North Yorkshire, England, built for Billy Butlin's holiday organisation. Construction of the camp began in 1939. From 1939 to 1945, the camp was used as a military training base, as RAF Hunmanby Moor. The camp closed in 1983.

The camp was served by its own railway branch and station (Filey Holiday Camp railway station) from 1947, however the station closed in 1977 due to greater car ownership. The derelict railway station platforms remain in situ today; however they are on private land.

Part of the old camp was replaced by Primrose Valley holiday park, and the adjacent "The Bay Filey" holiday resort. The boating lake was filled in and is now a large green area with a central path through it from the holiday park to the beach.

== History ==
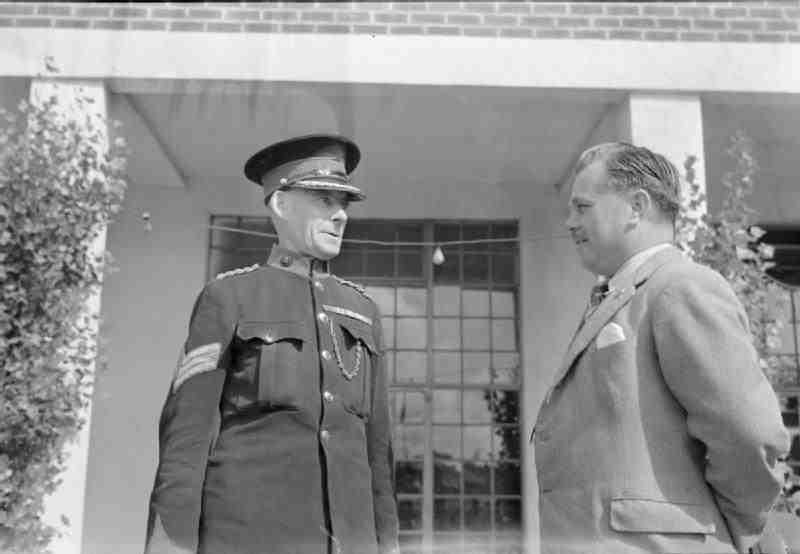
Butlin (right) visiting the Filey camp in 1945

Filey Holiday Camp was being built for Billy Butlin in 1939. The outbreak of the Second World War led to an arrangement with the War Ministry whereby the ministry financed the camp's completion and used it as housing for military personnel as RAF Hunmanby Moor. Butlin reclaimed the base in 1945. A branch off the Hull Scarborough railway line was built in 1945 and formally opened in 1947. The line had its own terminal station Filey Holiday Camp railway station.

A 2 ft (610 mm) gauge narrow gauge railway was installed at the camp around 1953. The original train, supplied by Baguley, was sold in 1975, the carriages being reused by the Meirion Mill Railway at Dinas Mawddwy in Wales.

At its peak, the camp accommodated 11,000 visitors, with 175,000 visitors in total in the 1975 season. The railway branch became less used by visitors from the 1960s due to the rise of car ownership, and closure was proposed in 1972, after which Butlin's funded the cost of the line. The line was closed in 1977.

The Butlin's holiday camp was closed in 1983. The site was briefly re-opened as Amtree Park in 1986.

The camp buildings were demolished between 1988 and 2003.

== In popular culture ==
The camp was used as a filming location for the 1947 British comedy drama film Holiday Camp. Although Filey camp had its own railway station, the opening shot of a train arriving at the station was filmed at Sandsend railway station, as the view at Sandsend was considered more spectacular.
