= Filey Holiday Camp railway station =

Disused railway station in North Yorkshire, England

Filey Holiday Camp
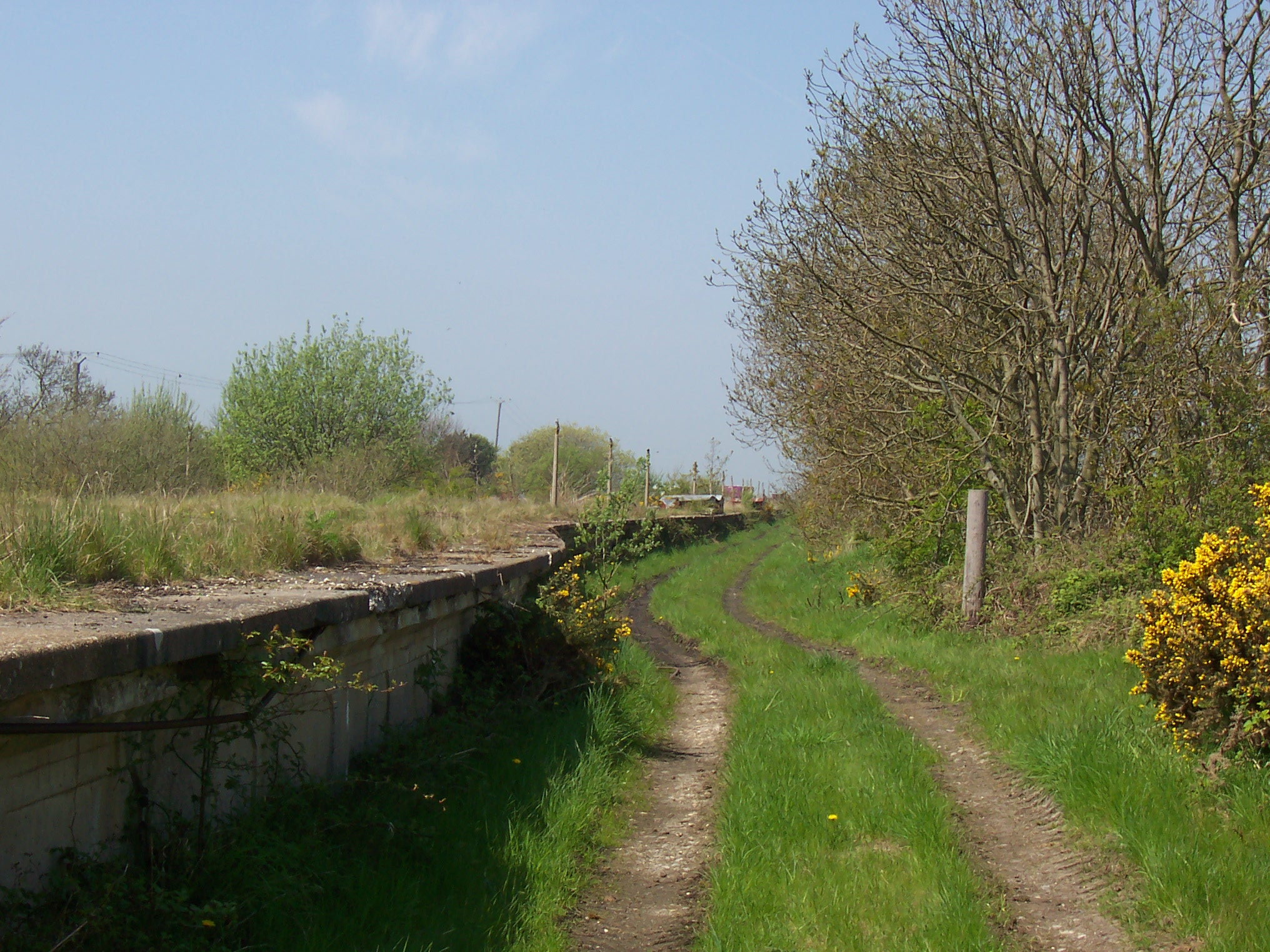

General information
- Location: Filey, North Yorkshire; England
- Coordinates: 54.1819°N 0.2926°W
- Grid reference: TA115775
- Platforms: 4

Other information
- Status: Disused

History
- Original company: London and North Eastern Railway

Key dates
- 1947: Opened
- 1977: Closed
Location

Filey Holiday Camp railway station was a railway station built by the London and North Eastern Railway to serve Butlin's Filey Holiday Camp just south of Filey, in the then East Riding of Yorkshire, England. (Filey became part of North Yorkshire in 1974.)

== History ==
The station was officially opened on 10 May 1947 by Lord Middleton, Lord Lieutenant of the East Riding of Yorkshire.

The station was situated at the end of a short branch line off the Yorkshire Coast Line. It had four long terminus island platforms to cater for the large number of holiday makers arriving and departing from the holiday camp each Saturday during the holiday season. The station was located to the west of the A165 and was connected to the holiday camp by a private subway under the road. Passengers were taken to and from the station by a road train using this subway. Passenger numbers dropped significantly as more people arrived at the camp by car. The last train service departed on 17 September 1977 with formal closure occurring on 26 November 1977.

== Accidents and incidents ==
- On 25 August 1956, an empty stock train, hauled by Ex-GNR Class H4 2-6-0 No. 61846, ran away and crashed through the buffers due to the failure to connect the brake pipe between the train and the locomotive hauling it.

| Preceding station | Disused railways | Following station |
|---|---|---|
| Filey | London and North Eastern Railway (Butlins Triangle) | Terminus |
| Hunmanby | London and North Eastern Railway (Butlins Triangle) | Terminus |
