= Ticket platform =

A ticket platform was a platform situated outside a passenger railway station to allow passengers' tickets to be collected.

These platforms were unpopular as they delayed the arrival of the trains just a short distance outside the station, but it did enable railway staff to collect tickets before passengers had a chance to leave the station.

Ticket platforms fell out of use when corridor coaches became common as these allowed on-board ticket collection.

The former ticket platform on the approach to Oban railway station in Scotland is still in place beside the railway, as is the one outside Liverpool Street Station, London to the south of the line. (Note: This may be a mistake as the platform remains just outside Liverpool Street station are the remains of Bishopsgate (Low Level) railway station.)

Ticket platforms are not to be confused with platform tickets.
