= Filey railway station =

Railway station in North Yorkshire, England

Filey
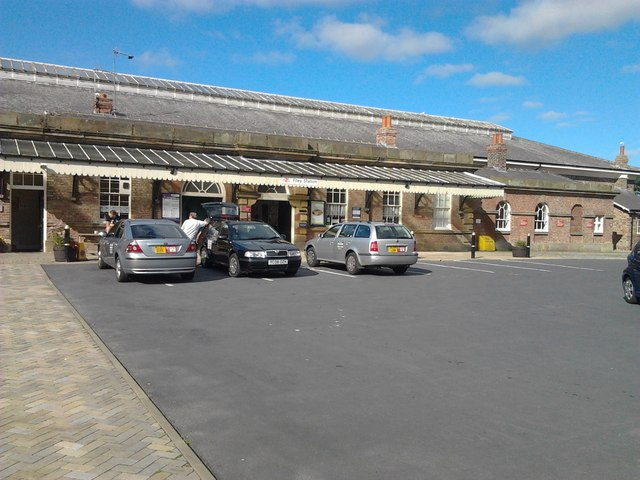
- Filey station

General information
- Location: Filey, North Yorkshire; England
- Coordinates: 54.20950°N 0.29200°W
- Grid reference: TA113806
- Managed by: Northern Trains
- Platforms: 2

Other information
- Station code: FIL
- Classification: DfT category F1

History
- Opened: 1846

Passengers
- 2020/21: ▼48,056
- 2021/22: ▲0.154 million
- 2022/23: ▲0.163 million
- 2023/24: ▼0.152 million
- 2024/25: ▲0.173 million

Listed Building – Grade II*
- Feature: Railway Station
- Designated: 23 August 1985
- Reference no.: 1167853
Location
Notes
- Passenger statistics from the Office of Rail and Road

Filey railway station is a Grade II* listed station opened in 1846 on the Hull to Scarborough Line, which serves the seaside town of Filey in North Yorkshire, England.

It is operated by Northern Trains, who provide all passenger train services.

== History ==
The station was on the York and North Midland Railway's branch from its York to Scarborough Railway (opened 1845) at Seamer to Bridlington, part of which connected to the Hull and Selby Railway (Bridlington branch) at Bridlington; both branches were sanctioned in 1845 and opened in 1846.

The station building was completed in 1846 to the designs of G.T. Andrews; a single storey red brick structure with slate roof and sandstone dressings, with a 7 bay main entrance projected from the station. The platforms were 276 and 277 feet (84 and 84 m) long. The trainshed roof was common Andrew's design using a wrought iron truss structure supporting a wood and slate roof.

The first train ran from Seamer station on 5 October 1846, arriving at 1 pm, with a large celebration and dinner including the presence of George Hudson. The regular service began the following day.

The rail facilities at Filey also included a goods shed, also an Andrew's design, on the opposite side of the level crossing northwest of the station, and a coal depot with sidings to the south east of the station, and a gas works adjacent to it.

A North Eastern Railway footbridge was added c. 1870. (Note: Because the standard design footbridge was wider than the station a hole was cut in the station wall to accommodate it.) The platforms were extended in 1888 to 364 and 383 feet (111 and 117 m), then to 390 and 405 feet (119 and 123 m) in 1906, timber platform extensions were also added later, giving a platform length of 480 feet (150 m) at peak. In the 19th century there were also ticket platforms.

Goods traffic to Filey ceased in 1964, as part of the Beeching reforms.

In the 1960s one end of the hipped roof was removed along with the ventilated roof lantern, the other end in the 1970s. In 1985 the building was given listed building status. In 1988 BR sought planning permission to remove the roof entirely but was refused, instead the roof was reconstructed including the hipped ends, at an eventual cost of over £450,000 funded by BR, heritage bodies, and the town and borough councils.

The section of line northwards to Seamer was reduced to single track as an economy measure in 1983, but that south to Hunmanby is still double. The signal box at the north end was closed and removed in 2000, when the entire Bridlington to Seamer section was re-signalled and control of the signals and level crossing passed to the remaining box at the latter station. Automatic barriers replaced the old manual wooden crossing gates here as part of this work.

== Facilities ==
Although the main buildings remain, the station is unstaffed; Northern installed a new ticket vending machine here in August 2018. Waiting rooms are available for use during the day on each platform, alongside a station cafe and taxi office. Train running information is provided by telephone and timetable posters. There is step-free access to each platform via the level crossing at the north end.

== Services ==
Services from Filey station run northbound to Seamer and Scarborough, and southbound towards Bridlington and Hull, with most services continuing on to Doncaster and Sheffield. These services operate hourly on all days of the week.

| Preceding station | National Rail | Following station |
|---|---|---|
| Hunmanby | Northern Trains Hull–Scarborough line | Seamer |
Historical railways
| Hunmanby | Y&NMR Yorkshire Coast Line | Gristhorpe Station closed; Line open |
Disused railways
| Terminus | London and North Eastern Railway Butlins Triangle | Filey Holiday Camp |

== See also ==
- Grade II* listed buildings in North Yorkshire (district)
- Listed buildings in Filey
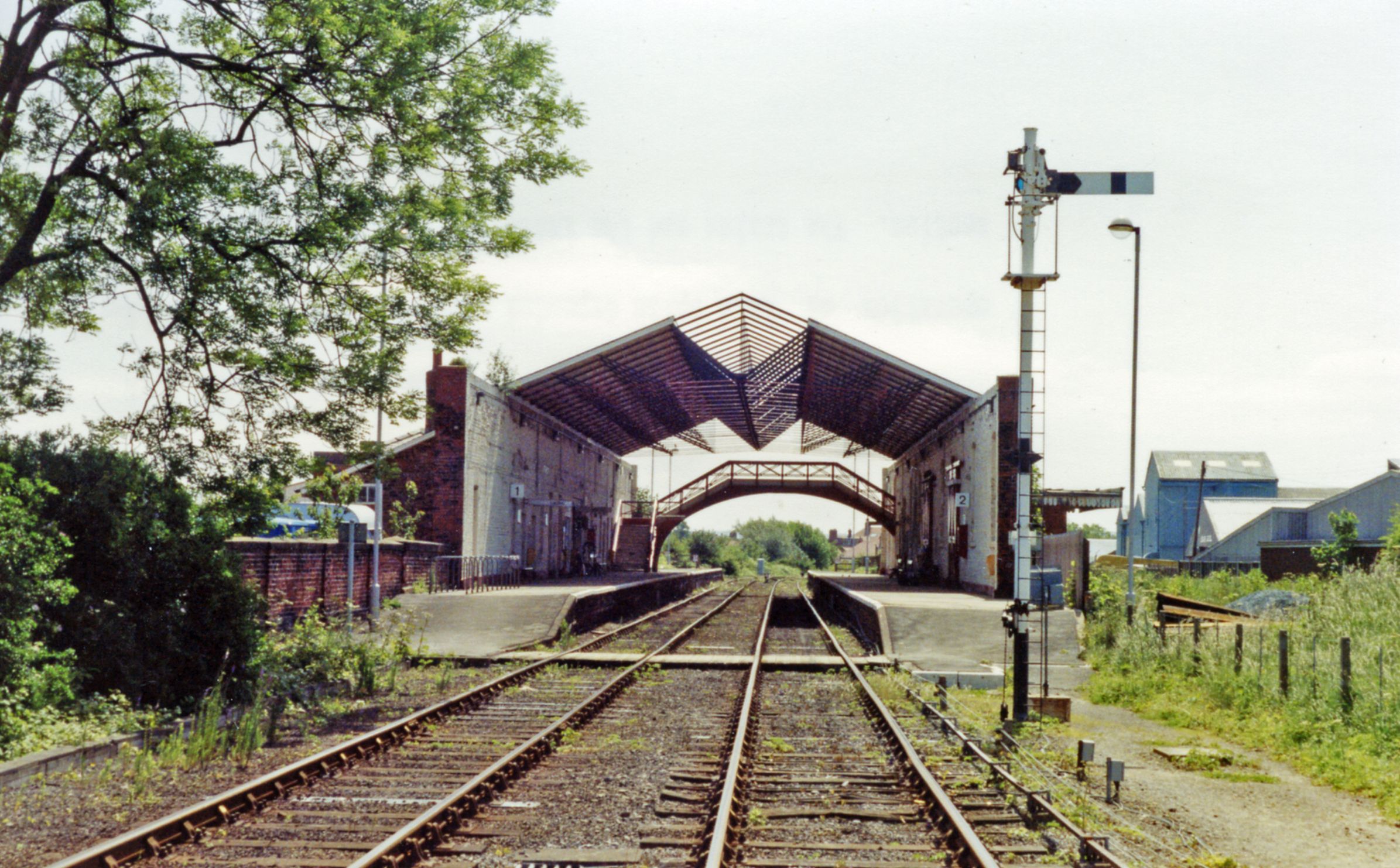
The station before completion of the roof restoration (1992)

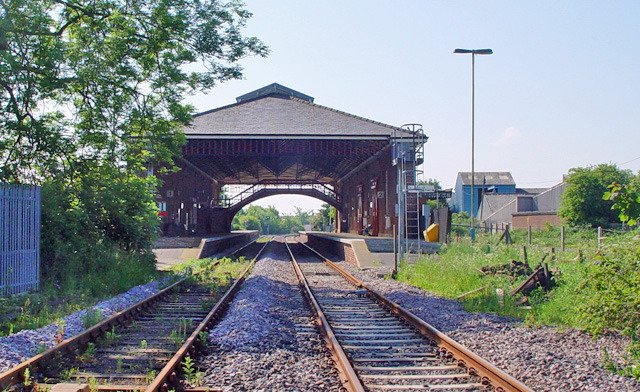
The station after the roof restoration (2008)

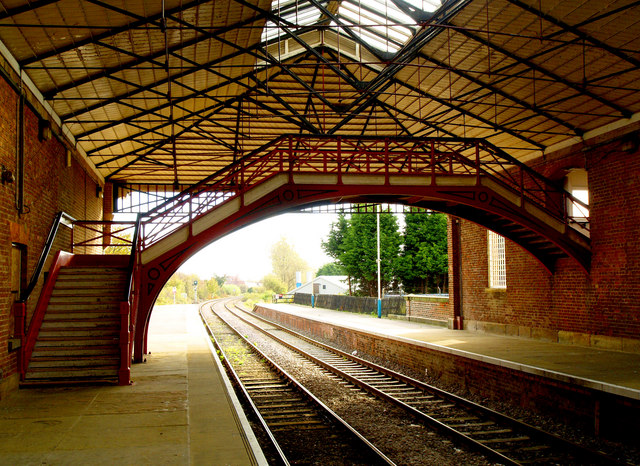
The standard NER footbridge (2009)
