= Scarborough railway station =

Railway station in North Yorkshire, England

Scarborough
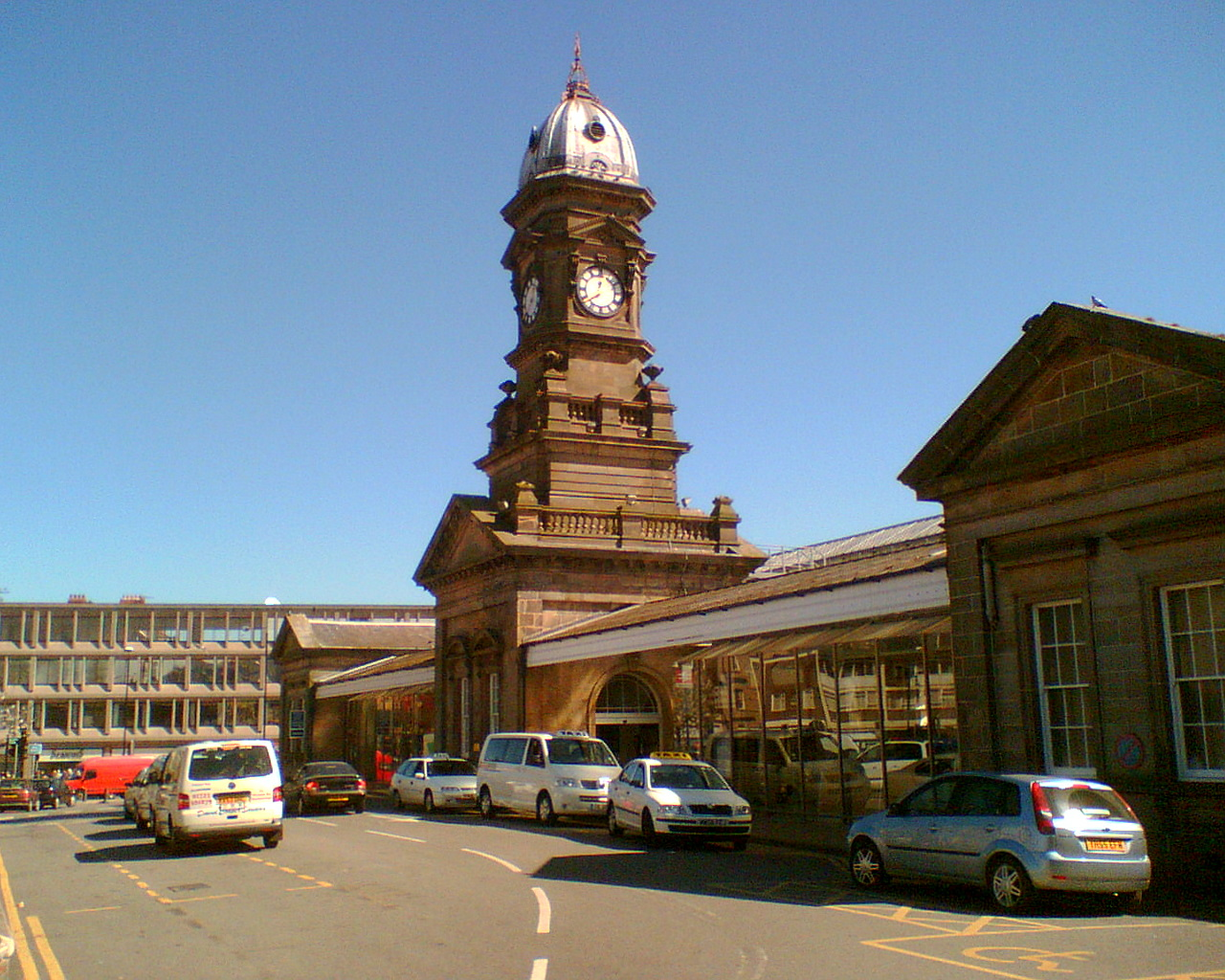
- The entrance to the station

General information
- Location: Scarborough, North Yorkshire; England
- Coordinates: 54.2798°N 0.4055°W
- Grid reference: TA039883
- Manager: TransPennine Express
- Platforms: 5

Other information
- Station code: SCA
- Classification: DfT category C1

History
- Opened: 1845

Passengers
- 2020/21: ▼0.270 million
- 2021/22: ▲0.841 million
- 2022/23: ▲0.863 million
- 2023/24: ▲0.897 million
- 2024/25: ▲1.001 million

Listed Building – Grade II
- Feature: Scarborough railway station
- Designated: 8 June 1973
- Reference no.: 1243452
Location
Notes
- Passenger statistics from the Office of Rail and Road

Scarborough, formerly Scarborough Central, is a Grade II listed railway station serving the seaside town of Scarborough, North Yorkshire. It lies 42 miles 6 chains (67.7 km) east of York and is one of the eastern termini on the North TransPennine route; it is managed by TransPennine Express and is also served by Northern Trains. The station is also at the northern end of the Yorkshire Coast line and is reputed to have the longest station seat in the world at 456-foot (139 m).

From 1907 until 2010, the station approaches were controlled from a 120-lever signal box named Falsgrave; this is sited at the outer end of platform 1 and close to the former excursion station at Scarborough Londesborough Road. In its final years, Falsgrave box controlled a mixture of colour-light and semaphore signals, including a gantry carrying 11 semaphores. The signal box was decommissioned in September 2010 and the gantry was dismantled and removed in October 2010. Its new home is at Grosmont railway station, on the North Yorkshire Moors Railway. The new signalling is a relay-based interlocking with two- and three-aspect LED signals controlled from an extension to the existing panel at nearby Seamer.

== History ==
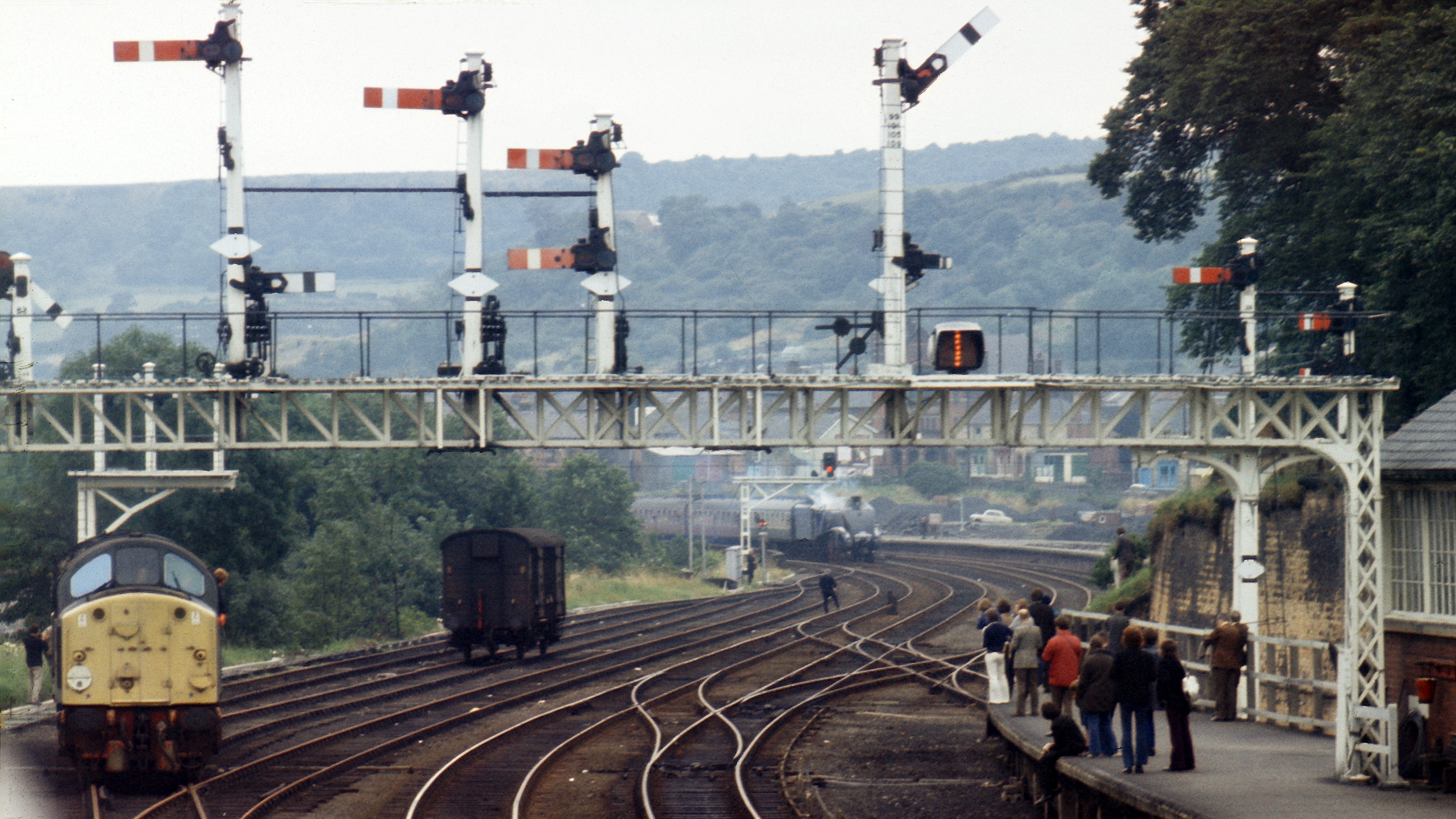
Former signal gantry in July 1986. Number 4468 Mallard can be seen in the background

Scarborough station opened on 8 July 1845, following the completion of the line from York. To accommodate excursion traffic, two new platforms were added in 1883, now known as platforms 1 and 2. Separate waiting rooms and more facilities were provided. The station clock, built by Potts of Leeds and costing £110 (equivalent to £11,564 in 2025), was added in about 1884. After a three-year planning dispute, remodelling of the station concourse began in 2026.

=== Accidents and incidents ===
On 10 August 1943 Scarborough station was the scene of an accident between two trains at platform 5. The late-running 09:05 express from Hull was wrongly routed by the signalman and hit the 11:18 stopping train, which was waiting to depart. Four passengers in the first coach of the stopping train – all soldiers – were killed, eight received serious injuries and a further 22 suffered minor injuries. Nobody was injured on the express train.

Platforms

== Facilities ==
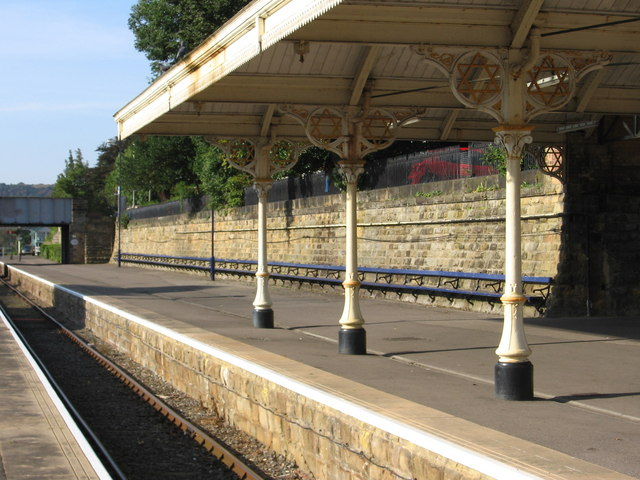
The long seat on Platform 1 previously covered by a roof.

Scarborough station has a Travel Centre, ticket office, touch-screen ticket machines and a Pumpkin Cafe. The main building has a small waiting room.

Platforms 3–5 are partly covered, as is platform 1, which reputedly features the longest railway bench in the world at 456-foot (139 m) in length.

Benches are provided throughout the station, which is staffed at all times. The station also has two payphones, a vending machine and luggage trolleys, as well as toilets and cycle racks. Step-free access is available to all platforms.

== Passenger volume ==
Passenger Volume at Scarborough
	2002–03	2004–05	2005–06	2006–07	2007–08	2008–09	2009–10	2010–11	2011–12	2012–13	2013–14	2014–15	2015–16	2016–17	2017–18	2018–19	2019–20	2020–21	2021–22	2022–23
Entries and exits	666,788	747,858	751,998	765,730	772,824	803,466	828,594	857,430	906,544	880,202	910,637	927,022	940,706	979,098	989,952	958,026	973,424	270,262	840,994	862,784
Interchanges	– (Note: No data available.)	1,031	909	3,270	2,029	2,279	1,781	1,907	2,043	2,412	2,320	1,088	1,265	3,228	3,361	1,729	0	0	0	0

The statistics cover twelve month periods that start in April.

== Services ==
Platform and train shed, with a BR Class 185 operated by TransPennine Express

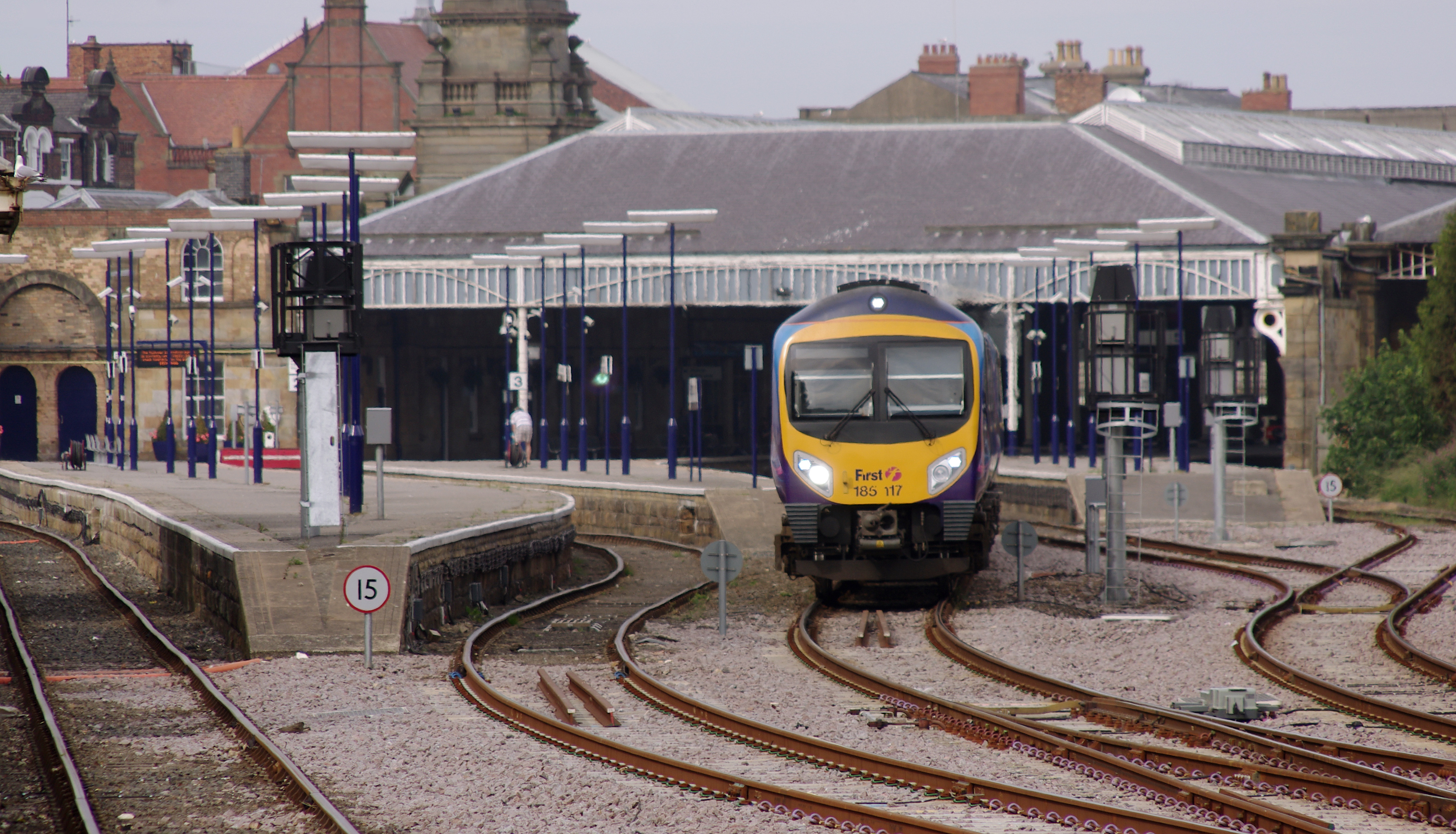
North-eastbound view from platform 1

The typical daily service from the station is:

=== TransPennine Express ===
The basic Monday - Friday off-peak service pattern, as of May 2025, is as follows::

- 1 tph to Manchester Victoria via York, Leeds and Huddersfield

There is 1 tpd that extends to serve Manchester Airport

Rolling stock used: Class 185 Desiro and Class 802 Nova 1.

=== Northern Trains ===
Monday to Saturday:

- 1 tph to Sheffield via Beverley, Hull Paragon and Doncaster
- 1 tpd to York via Beverley, Hull Paragon and Selby

Sunday

- 1 tph to Sheffield via Beverley, Hull Paragon and Doncaster

=== Other operators ===
From 2000 until 2019, Midland Mainline and successors East Midlands Trains and East Midlands Railway operated one return service from and to London St Pancras via Doncaster on summer Saturdays; these were run initially with Class 170s and later Class 222s.

Previously in summer, West Coast Railways operated a steam locomotive-hauled Scarborough Spa Express services from York; however, a regular planned service has not operated for some years, and now only the occasional charter train is operated.

Preceding station	National Rail	Following station
Seamer	Northern Trains Hull–Scarborough line	Terminus
Seamer	TransPennine Express North TransPennine	Terminus
	Historical railways	
Scarborough Londesborough Road	Y&NMR York to Scarborough Line	Terminus
York	East Midlands Railway York to Scarborough Line	Terminus
	Disused railways	
Terminus	Scarborough & Whitby Railway	Scalby

=== Service improvements ===
The new TPE and Northern franchises, which started in April 2016, were committed to improved service frequencies and rolling stock on both lines – the York route was have two departures per hour instead of the previous one as of December 2019, both operators offering an hourly service as far as York, whilst the Hull line now has an hourly timetable seven days per week. The latter was introduced at the May 2019 timetable change, but plans for the York line to go to 2tph have since been put on hold due to lack of available rolling stock.

Trains to Liverpool were also diverted west of Stalybridge to travel via Manchester Victoria and Newton-le-Willows (reverting to the route they used prior to May 1989). The improved service saw a new £7 million train servicing depot built in Scarborough to maintain the rolling stock.

== Local connections ==
This station offers access to the Cleveland Way
Distance to path	1 mile
Next station anticlockwise	Whitby 21 miles
Next station clockwise	Filey 7 miles

== See also ==
- Listed buildings in Scarborough (Castle Ward)

== Bibliography ==
- Quick, Michael (2023). Railway Passenger Stations in Great Britain: A Chronology (PDF) (5th ed.). London: Railway and Canal Historical Society.
