= Stockton-on-the-Forest =

Village and civil parish in North Yorkshire, England

Coordinates: 53.9961°N 0.9984°W

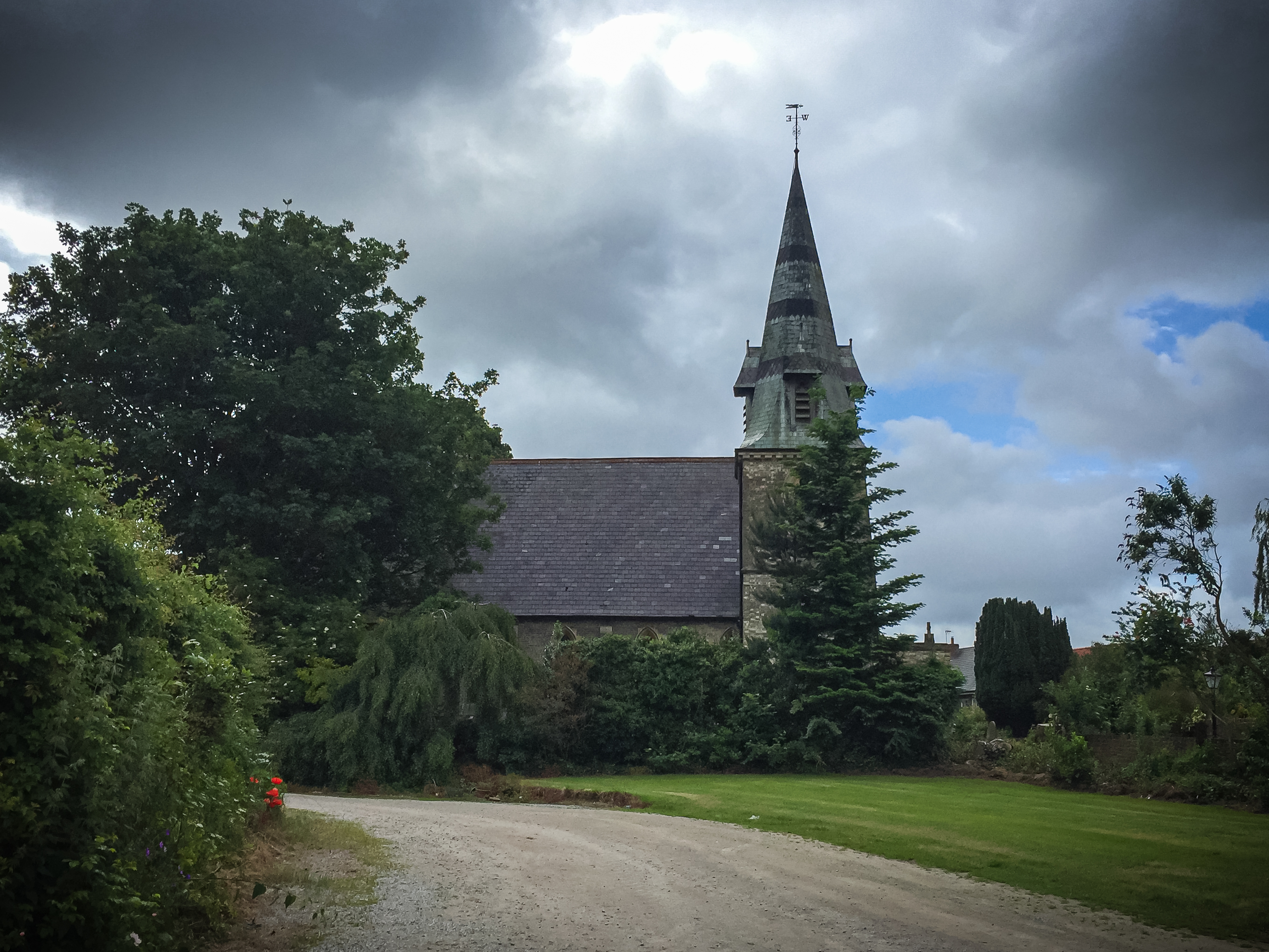
- Holy Trinity church, Stockton-on-the-Forest

- Location within North Yorkshire
- Population: 1,384 (2021 census)
- OS grid reference: SE656560
- Civil parish: Stockton-on-the-Forest
- Unitary authority: City of York
- Ceremonial county: North Yorkshire
- Region: Yorkshire and the Humber
- Country: England
- Sovereign state: United Kingdom
- Post town: YORK
- Postcode district: YO32
- Dialling code: 01904
- Police: North Yorkshire
- Fire: North Yorkshire
- Ambulance: Yorkshire
- UK Parliament: York Outer

Stockton-on-the-Forest is a village and civil parish in the unitary authority of the City of York in North Yorkshire, England.

== History ==
Stockton House, an 18th century Georgian house

The name Stockton probably derives from the Old English stoctūn meaning 'settlement associated with a secondary settlement'. Alternatively, it may derive from stocctūn meaning 'settlement made of logs'.

The village is mentioned in the Domesday Book as Stocthun in the Bulford hundred. After the Norman invasion the land was shared between Count Alan (of Brittany) and Canons of York (St Peter).

The village is home to Stockton Hall built c. 1800 as a country house and Grade II listed building. It is now a secure unit for mentally ill patients operated by the Priory Group. The hall is a brick-built three-storey building with a five-bay frontage. It was acquired by barrister George Lloyd of Leeds, from whom it passed to his daughter Miss Alicia Maria Lloyd. She left it in 1892 to her nephew George William Lloyd.

Stockton House, another Grade II listed building, is also present in the village. The Georgian two-storey house was built by Thomas and Susanna Wilkinson in c. 1800 and was the first Methodist chapel in the village.

The village was historically part of the North Riding of Yorkshire until 1974. It was then a part of the district of Ryedale in North Yorkshire from 1974 until 1996. Since 1996 it has been part of the City of York unitary authority.

== Governance ==
The village lies within the York Outer UK Parliament constituency. It also lies within the Strensall electoral ward of City of York Council. A parish council also exists with regular meetings in the village hall.

== Geography ==
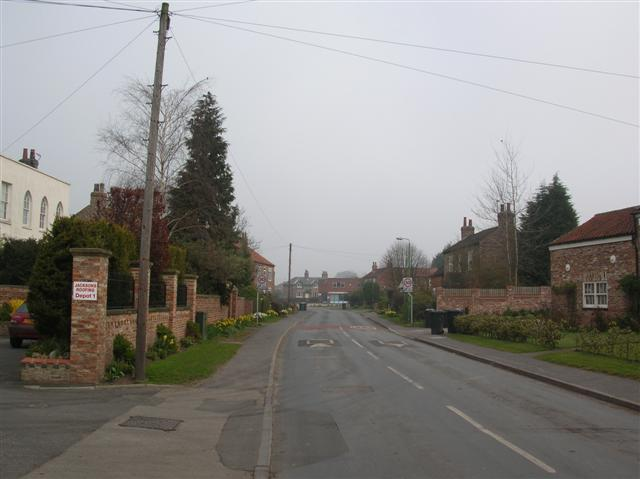
Main street

Stockton-on-the-Forest is located to the east of the A64 road to Scarborough and the roundabout interchange of the A64 and the A1036. To the east there are the villages of Upper Helmsley and Sand Hutton and to the south the villages of Warthill, Holtby and Murton.

According to the 2001 census the parish had a population of 1,261, reducing to 1,214 at the 2011 census and increasing to 1,384 in the 2021 census

Stockton-on-the-Forest is a good example of a linear village, as it follows only one main road (Stockton Lane/Sandy Lane) for approximately 1.5 miles (2.4 km), branching out only near the west end. Many of the houses along the main road do not have house numbers but individual names many with references to agriculture, local features or mysticism.

Since 1988 the village has been part of a conservation area that includes the village, main street, Stockton Hall, and its surrounding grounds.

== Religion ==
Stockton-on-the-Forest is served by one church, the Anglican Holy Trinity Church that was rebuilt in 1843. In 2012 the churches of Stockton-on-the-Forest, Holtby and Warthill joined with Dunnington church to form Rural East York. The Methodist Chapel was closed in May 2010 and subsequently demolished to make way for residential property.

== Amenities ==
Stockton-on-the-Forest village hall

The village has a local pub, called The Fox. A Scout group has operated in the village since 1969, consisting of a Beaver Colony, Cub Pack and Scout Troop. The village also has a village hall.

Forest Park Golf Club stretches between the village and the A64 road. The Snowball Plantation woodland area and Scout park is situated on the eastern end of the village.

The village GP surgery closed in August 2023.

== Education ==
Stockton-on-the-Forest has a primary school for local residents accommodating approximately 100 pupils. The village lies within the catchment area of Huntington School, a secondary school located in nearby Huntington.

== Transport ==
Stockton-on-the-Forest is currently served by bus operator Coastliner that links the village with the cities of Leeds and York as well as the east coast of Yorkshire via Malton. The A64 is located nearby, a major connecting road in the region. The village was served by Warthill railway station on the York to Beverley Line between 1847 and 1959.
