= Beverley railway station =

Railway station in the East Riding of Yorkshire, England

Beverley
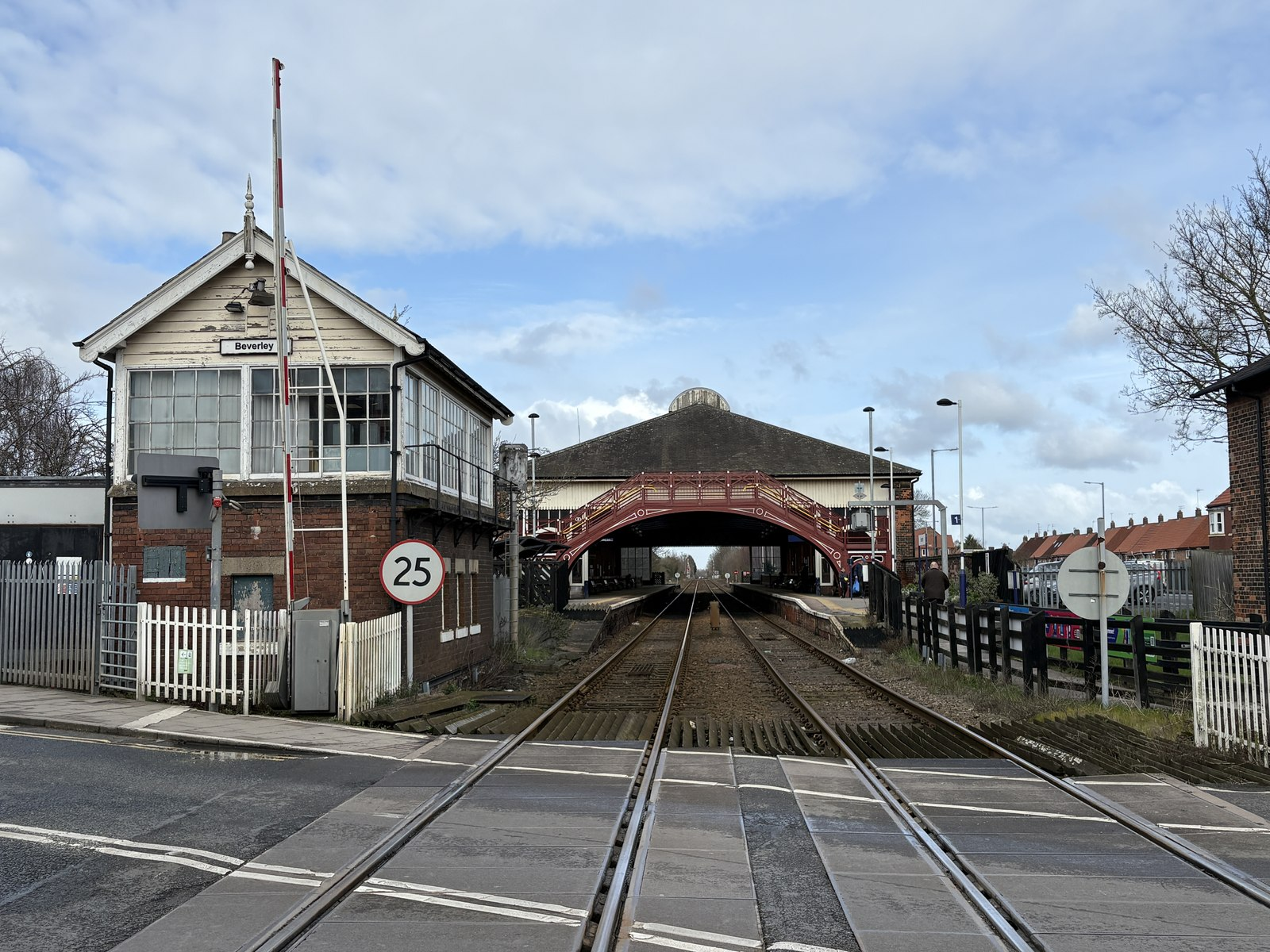
- Beverley railway station, signal box and Chantry lane crossing (2026)

General information
- Location: Beverley, East Riding of Yorkshire; England
- Coordinates: 53.842000°N 0.421000°W
- Grid reference: TA038396
- Manager: Northern Trains
- Platforms: 2

Other information
- Station code: BEV
- Classification: DfT category E

History
- Opened: 7 October 1846

Passengers
- 2020/21: ▼0.125 million
- Interchange: ▼1
- 2021/22: ▲0.518 million
- Interchange: ▲4
- 2022/23: ▲0.604 million
- Interchange: ▲6
- 2023/24: ▲0.643 million
- Interchange: 6
- 2024/25: ▲0.754 million
- Interchange: ▲12
Location
Notes
- Passenger statistics from the Office of Rail and Road

Beverley railway station serves the market town of Beverley in the East Riding of Yorkshire, England. It is located on the Hull to Scarborough Line and is operated by Northern Rail who provide most passenger services from the station, Hull Trains also serve this station.

== History ==
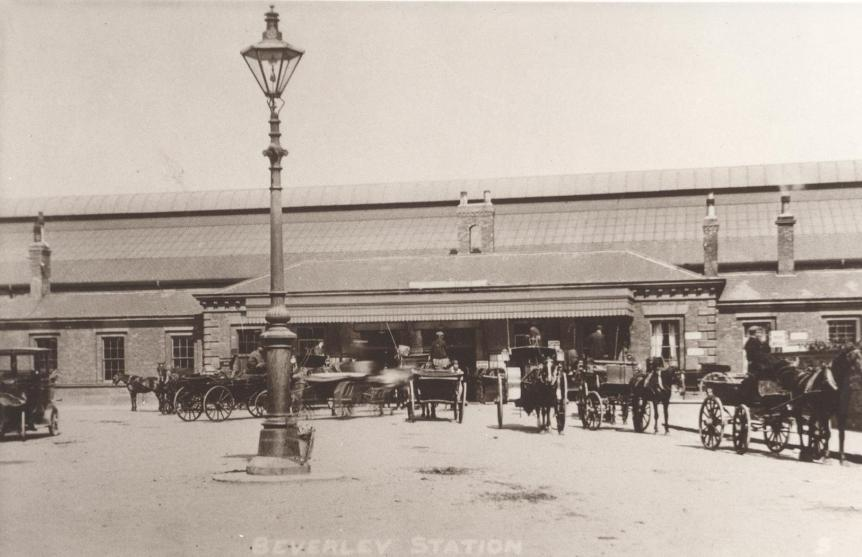
The station in c. 1910, when there was a canopy in front of the entrance

Beverley station was opened in October 1846 by the York and North Midland Railway leased Bridlington branch of the Hull and Selby Railway. The original station was designed by G. T. Andrews.

Beverley gained junction status nineteen years later in 1865 when the North Eastern Railway completed the Market Weighton to Beverley section of the York to Beverley Line.

The station was also planned to be the junction for the North Holderness Light Railway. This intended railway was given an Act in Parliament for 'transferring to the company the North Holderness Light Railway Company; and for other purposes, North Eastern Railway Bill [Lords].' The act was passed on 8 June 1899, but the NER never built the line.

The York to Beverley Line closed as a result of the Beeching Axe on 29 November 1965.

The station received listed building status in 1985.

The platforms

== Facilities ==
The station has a staffed ticket office, which is open Mondays to Fridays from 07:00 until 17:00 and until 13:30 on Saturdays (closed Sundays). 2 ticket machines are also provided. There is a waiting room and cafe in the main building next to the ticket hall.

Step-free access is available to both platforms, though the southbound one is reached via a staffed barrier level crossing. Train running details are offered via digital display screens and timetable posters.

== Future ==
The station may have more services introduced as part of the reopening of the York to Beverley Line via Market Weighton as part of the government's Restore Your Railway's plans.

== Services ==
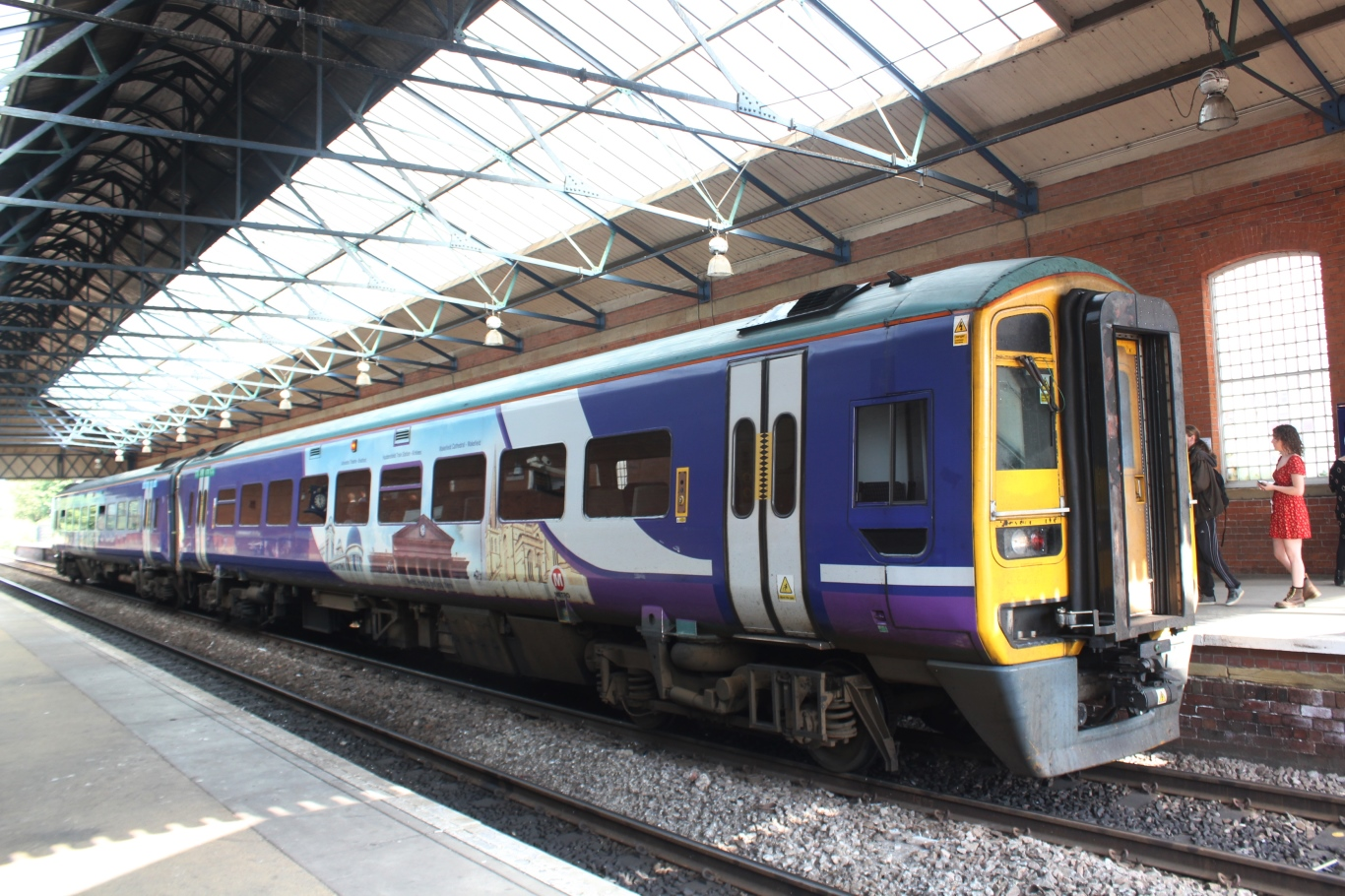
A Class 158 at Beverley on a Scarborough to Hull service

The station has a two trains per hour service to Hull and Bridlington, with an hourly service to Scarborough on weekdays. At peak times, a number of extra trains from Hull terminate/start here. Most services to Hull continue to Doncaster and Sheffield or Selby & York. Trains run hourly in each direction on Sundays, with most southbound trains running to Sheffield & hourly extensions northbound to Scarborough all year since the December 2009 timetable change (this service level previously only ran in summer).

On 4 February 2015 Hull Trains commenced operating one service per weekday between Beverley and London King's Cross with British Rail Class 802. Since May 2019, this has been increased to two trains per day.

Preceding station	National Rail	Following station
Cottingham	Northern Yorkshire Coast Line	Arram
Cottingham	Hull Trains; London–Beverley	Terminus
Disused railways
Cherry Burton	Y&NMR York to Beverley Line	Terminus
Terminus	North Holderness Light Railway Proposed line, never built	Tickton

== See also ==
- Listed buildings in Beverley (south area)
