= Joseph Rowntree School =

Voluntary controlled school in York, North Yorkshire, England

The Joseph Rowntree School

Location
- Haxby Road, New Earswick; York, North Yorkshire, YO32 4BZ; England; 53°59′54″N 1°04′14″W

Information
- Type: Voluntary controlled school
- Motto: The right school to grow in
- Established: 1942
- Local authority: City of York
- Department for Education URN: 121711 Tables
- Ofsted: Reports
- Headteacher: David Hewitt
- Staff: 150+
- Gender: Coeducational
- Age: 11 to 18
- Enrolment: 1,200+
- Website: www.josephrowntree.co.uk

The Joseph Rowntree School is a comprehensive school on Haxby Road in New Earswick in the unitary authority City of York, England.

== Admissions ==
The school is just north of Huntington, close to the A1237 bypass, the Foss Walk, and the River Foss. The school has a sixth form.

== History ==
The Joseph Rowntree Village Trust maintains the model village of New Earswick, built by the Quaker organisation. It is analogous to Bournville and the Cadbury family, who were also Quakers. The village of Earswick is on the other side of the A1237 and the river, to the north-east. The primary school opened in 1912. Built when the area was in the North Riding Local Education Authority, the school opened on 12 January 1942 to serve the Flaxton Rural District, comprising nineteen villages. It was officially opened on 7 July 1942 by Rab Butler. It had a capacity for 480, based on class sizes of 40. It covered 14 acres (57,000 m^{2}) and built in West Huntington Park. From 1944, it was proposed to make the school bi-lateral, with a technical school section of the school intake.

In 2016, the school was successfully sued for £180,000 due to disabled discrimination of a former employee.

== Comprehensive school ==
The early 1970s were a period of change for the school. In 1973 the long planned raising of the school leaving age to 16 came into effect, in the same year North Riding Education Committee adopted the comprehensive system. As a result of the 1974 local government reorganisation, the school continued as a comprehensive under control of North Yorkshire County Council, with intake mainly from the Ryedale District Council catchment area. With 1973 being the first year with a full fifth form, by 1974 there were sufficient numbers for the creation of a sixth form, although initially only fourteen pupils took advantage. Five academic subjects were available with the first A Levels awarded in 1976.

Education in York was reorganised in 1985 and the school became a comprehensive. When the York bypass was built in 1985, a subway was built for walking to Haxby from the school.

== School reconstruction ==
Construction began on the £29 million reconstruction project in September 2008, and was completed in early 2010. It was built by Carillion, with an energy efficient building with a biomass boiler and 120-seat lecture theatre. The old school was demolished and used as foundation material for a car park.

The school has a main hall, playing fields, a sport centre, and an ASD unit. Each department is called a cluster, named after a famous topic or individual corresponding to the department's subject, such as Turing, Faraday and Vaudeville.

== Academic results ==
Results at GCSE are at the England average. In 2009 72% of students achieved 5 or more passes at GCSE A*–C. At A-level in 2009, 99% of students achieved grade A to E, 90% achieved A to C and 60% of students achieved A's or B's.

== Diplomas ==
Joseph Rowntree School offers the Society, Health and Development diploma for young people aged 14–19.

== Former students ==
- Mark Addy – actor, The Thin Blue Line, Game of Thrones, The Full Monty
- Sam Byram – professional footballer for Leeds United FC
- Max McMillan - professional footballer
- Hamish McArthur – professional rock climber and competition climber

== See also ==
- Huntington School, York – nearby school
- Bootham School – independent school set up by Quakers, and attended by the Rowntree family
