= Earswick railway station =

Disused railway station in York, England

Earswick
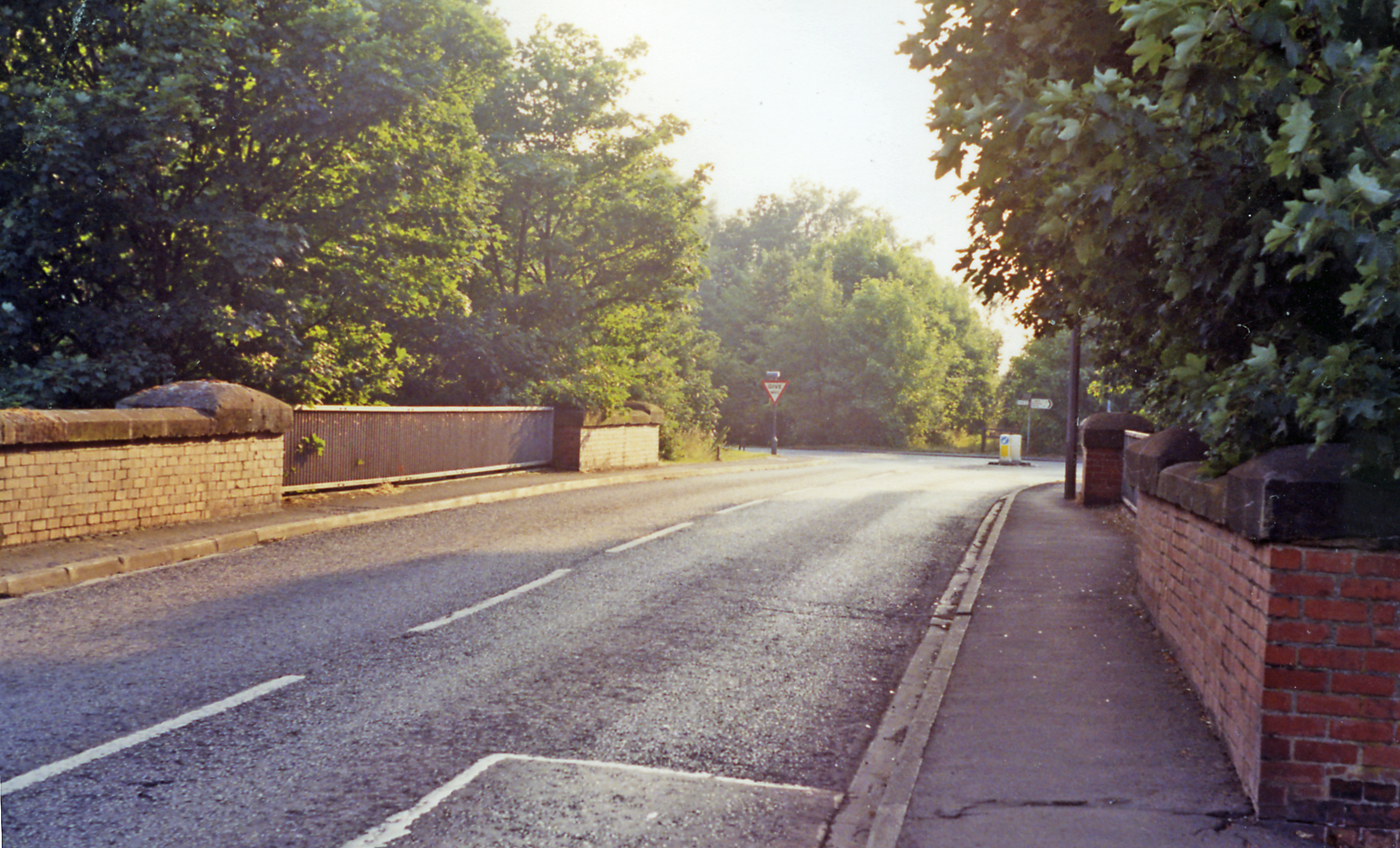
- Location of the station

General information
- Location: Huntington, City of York; England
- Coordinates: 53.989670°N 1.066870°W
- Grid reference: SE612550
- Platforms: 2

Other information
- Status: Disused

History
- Original company: York and North Midland Railway
- Pre-grouping: North Eastern Railway
- Post-grouping: London and North Eastern Railway

Key dates
- 4 October 1847: Opened as Huntington
- 1 November 1874: Renamed Earswick
- 29 November 1965: Closed
Location

Earswick station (before 1874, known as Huntington station) was a station on the York to Beverley Line north east of the City of York, England.

== History ==
Huntington station opened on 4 October 1847 and served the villages of Huntington and New Earswick.

The station was renamed Earswick station on 1 November 1874. It closed on 27 November 1965.

The station and platforms were demolished in 1970–1 and The Hogshead (formerly Flag and Whistle) pub now occupies the site where the station once stood.

Preceding station	Disused railways	Following station
York	Y&NMR; York to Beverley Line	Warthill
