= Londesborough Park railway station =

Former railway station in the East Riding of Yorkshire, England

Londesborough Park
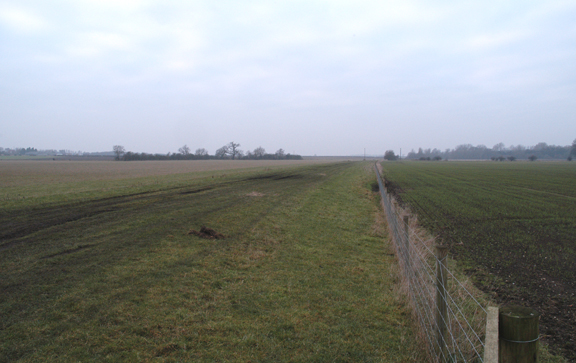
- View along the former railway line near the site of the station (2009)

General information
- Location: Londesborough, East Riding of Yorkshire; England
- Coordinates: 53.887940°N 0.713480°W
- Grid reference: SE846442

Other information
- Status: Disused

History
- Original company: York and North Midland Railway

Key dates
- unknown: Opened
- 1867: Closed
Location

Londesborough Park railway station was a short-lived private station on the York to Beverley Line at Londesborough in the East Riding of Yorkshire, England. It was created as a private station for George Hudson of Londesborough Hall. It closed in January 1867.

| Preceding station | Disused railways | Following station |
|---|---|---|
| Nunburnholme | Y&NMR; York to Beverley Line | Londesborough |
