= Pocklington railway station =

Disused railway station in the East Riding of Yorkshire, England

Pocklington
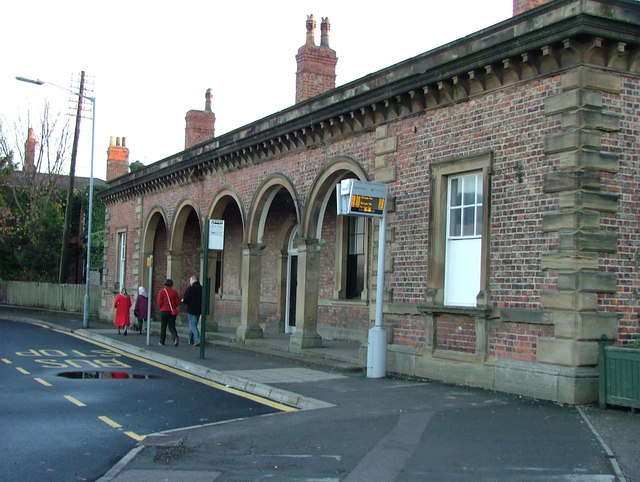

General information
- Location: Pocklington, East Riding of Yorkshire; England
- Coordinates: 53.9292°N 0.7810°W
- Grid reference: SE800488
- Platforms: 2

Other information
- Status: Disused

History
- Original company: York and North Midland Railway
- Pre-grouping: North Eastern Railway
- Post-grouping: London and North Eastern Railway

Key dates
- 4 October 1847: Opened
- 29 November 1965: Closed
Location

Pocklington railway station was a station on the York to Beverley Line that served the town of Pocklington, East Riding of Yorkshire, England. It opened on 4 October 1847 and closed after the last train on 27 November 1965.

The station trainshed, designed by George Townsend Andrews, is a Grade II listed building and now forms the sports hall of Pocklington School. The front entrance to the building recently served as one of the bays of Pocklington Bus Station which serves the East Yorkshire Motor Services bus service towards York from Hull, Beverley, Market Weighton, Driffield and Bridlington. In August 2024 railings were installed to protect the listed building from vandalism and misuse.

== See also ==
- Listed buildings in Pocklington

Preceding station	Disused railways	Following station
Yapham Gate	Y&NMR; York to Beverley Line	Nunburnholme
