= Holtby railway station =

Disused railway station in North Yorkshire, England

Holtby
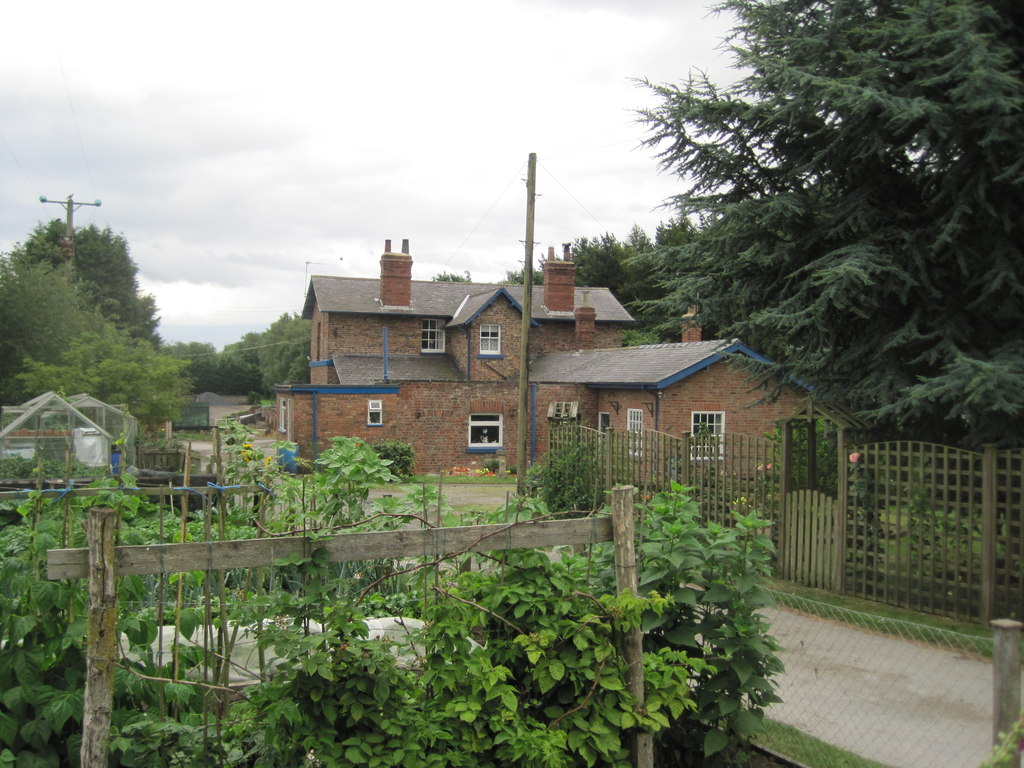
- The former station in 2010

General information
- Location: Gate Helmsley, North Yorkshire; England
- Coordinates: 53.9962°N 0.9400°W
- Grid reference: SE695560
- Platforms: 2

Other information
- Status: Disused

History
- Original company: York and North Midland Railway
- Pre-grouping: North Eastern Railway
- Post-grouping: London and North Eastern Railway

Key dates
- 1848: Opened as Gate Helmsley
- 1872: Renamed into Holtby
- 11 September 1939: Closed to passengers
- 1 January 1951: Closed to goods
Location

Holtby railway station was a station on the York to Beverley Line in North Yorkshire, England. It opened as Gate Helmsley in 1848 and was renamed Holtby in 1872. Passenger services ended in 1939 and goods services in 1951.

== History ==
Gate Helmsley station served the villages of Gate Helmsley and Holtby. It first appeared in timetables in June 1848, after the railway between York and Market Weighton had already been opened on 1 October 1847. The station was renamed to Holtby on 1 February 1872 to avoid confusion with similarly named stations elsewhere, although Holtby is further away from the station than Gate Helmsley. It had two platforms and on the down side an L-shaped brick-built station building designed by George Townsend Andrews which incorporated the stationmasters' home and the station offices. The up platform had a timber waiting shelter. The goods yard had only two sidings, one of them serving coal drops. It did not handle livestock. The station closed to passengers on 11 September 1939. Goods services ceased on 1 January 1951.

| Preceding station | Disused railways | Following station |
|---|---|---|
| Warthill | Y&NMR; York to Beverley Line | Stamford Bridge |
