= Nunburnholme railway station =

Disused railway station in the East Riding of Yorkshire, England

Nunburnholme
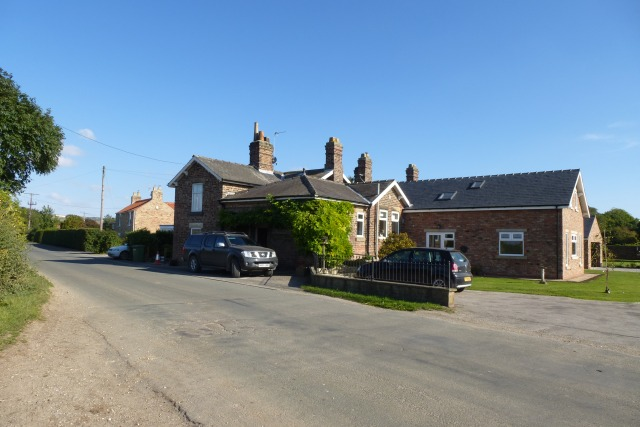
- Former station buildings (2013)

General information
- Location: Burnby, East Riding of Yorkshire; England
- Coordinates: 53.906260°N 0.733600°W
- Grid reference: SE833463
- Platforms: 2

Other information
- Status: Disused

History
- Original company: York and North Midland Railway
- Pre-grouping: North Eastern Railway
- Post-grouping: London and North Eastern Railway

Key dates
- 1848: Opened as Burnby
- 1873: renamed
- 1951: Closed
Location

Nunburnholme railway station was a railway station on the York to Beverley Line in the East Riding of Yorkshire, England. It opened in 1848 as Burnby, and was renamed 1873. It closed in 1951.

== History ==
Burnby railway station opened in 1848. It was renamed Nunburnholme on 1 January 1873.

The station served the villages of Nunburnholme and Burnby.

It closed on 31 March 1951.

Preceding station	Disused railways	Following station
Pocklington	Y&NMR; York to Beverley Line	Londesborough Park
