= Kiplingcotes railway station =

Disused railway station in the East Riding of Yorkshire, England

Kiplingcotes
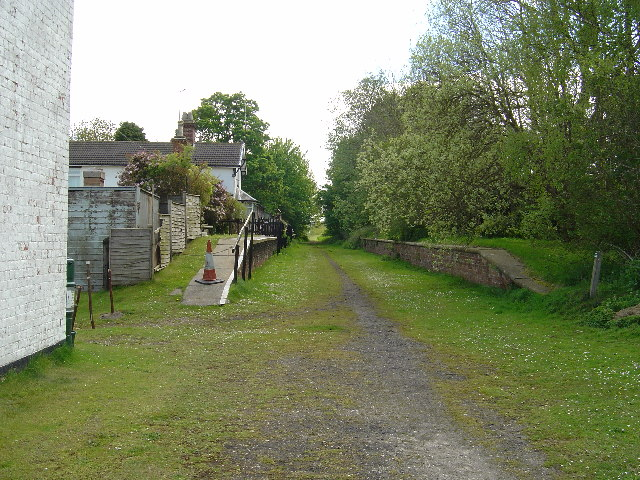
- The old trackbed through Kiplingcotes station

General information
- Location: Kiplingcotes, East Riding of Yorkshire; England
- Coordinates: 53.8826°N 0.5905°W
- Grid reference: SE927438
- Platforms: 2

Other information
- Status: Disused

History
- Original company: North Eastern Railway
- Pre-grouping: North Eastern Railway
- Post-grouping: London and North Eastern Railway; British Railways

Key dates
- 1865: opened
- 29 November 1965: closed
Location

Kiplingcotes railway station was a minor railway station on the York–Beverley line, in the East Riding of Yorkshire, England. It opened on 1 May 1865 and served the nearby village of Kiplingcotes.

It was built originally for the personal use of a local landowner and MP, Lord Hotham, as an incentive for him to allow the railway to pass through his estates. The station closed after the last train ran on 27 November 1965 along with the rest of the line. The station building, platforms and signal box survive unaltered, as does the station master's house.

Preceding station	Disused railways	Following station
Market Weighton	North Eastern Railway	Cherry Burton
