= All Saints' Church, Huntington =

Grade II* listed church in York, England

Coordinates: 53.9978°N 1.0634°W

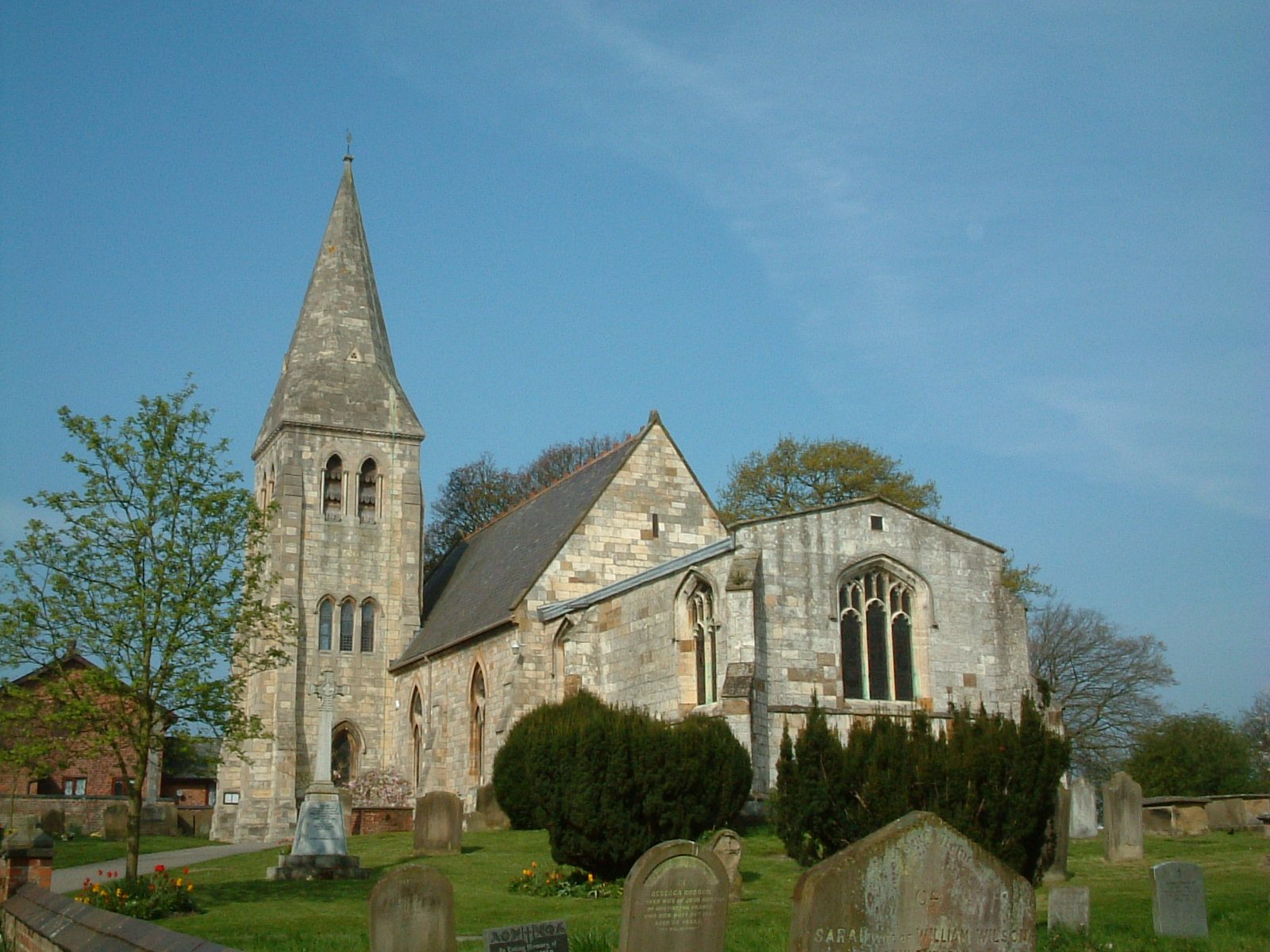
The church, in 2006

All Saints' Church lies in Huntington, now a suburb of York, in England.

An earlier All Saints' Church was built on the site in the 12th century. It was largely replaced by a new church in the 15th century, but one pier survives in an arcade by the organ, and the south door and its archway also remain, re-set in a new location. Of the 15th-century church, much of the chancel survives, with its east window, piscina and sedilia.

The nave, tower and organ chambers of the church were rebuilt in 1874 by C. T. Newstead, in the Geometric Decorated style. The bells were recast in the 1880s. Inside, the communion table is Jacobean, and there are two coffin lids, believed to be 13th-century.

The organ was built by Forster and Andrews in 1896 and was restored in 2001. A specification for it can be found on the National Pipe Organ Register.
