= Warthill railway station =

Disused railway station in North Yorkshire, England

Warthill
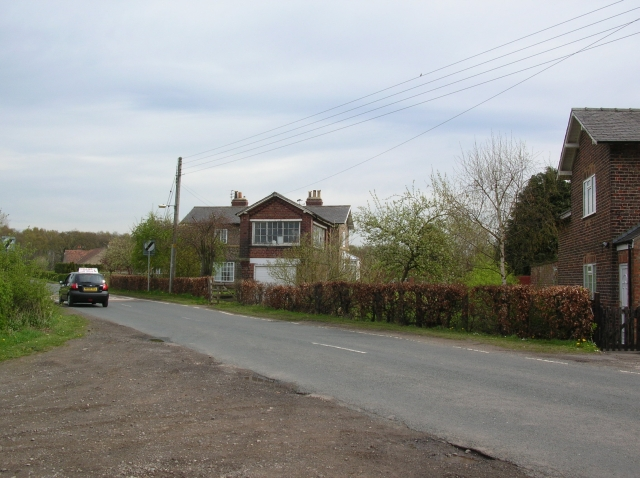

General information
- Location: Stockton-on-the-Forest, City of York; England
- Coordinates: 54.0053°N 0.9849°W
- Grid reference: SE666570
- Platforms: 2

Other information
- Status: Disused

History
- Original company: York and North Midland Railway
- Pre-grouping: North Eastern Railway
- Post-grouping: London and North Eastern Railway

Key dates
- 4 October 1847: Opened as Stockton
- April 1867: renamed Stockton Forest
- c. 1870: renamed Stockton-on-Forest
- 1 February 1872: renamed Warthill
- 5 January 1959: closed
Location

Warthill railway station was a station on the York to Beverley Line. It opened as Stockton station in 1847–8, was renamed to Stockton Forest (later Stockton-on-the-Forest) in 1867; in 1872 it became Warthill station. The station closed in 1959.

== History ==
Stockton station opened on 4 October 1847 and served the villages of Stockton-on-the-Forest and Warthill in North Yorkshire, England.

In 1867 it was renamed, Stockton Forest, and renamed again Stockton-on-Forest soon after. On 1 February 1872 it was renamed Warthill station.

Between 1922 and 1932 the station was also the southern terminus of the Sand Hutton Light Railway. This railway supplied the estate of Sir Robert Walker.

The level crossing at Warthill station was the first in the UK to have its manually operated gates replaced by lifting boom barriers.

It closed on 5 January 1959.

Preceding station	Disused railways	Following station
Earswick	Y&NMR; York to Beverley Line	Holtby
Terminus	Sand Hutton Light Railway	Sand Hutton or Claxton
