= Fangfoss railway station =

Disused railway station in the East Riding of Yorkshire, England

Fangfoss
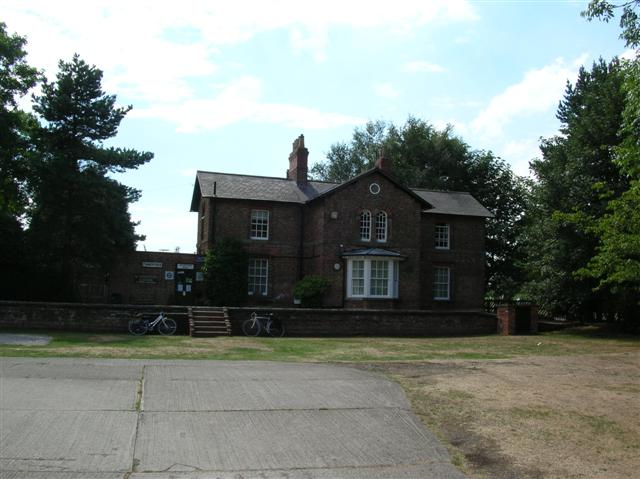

General information
- Location: Fangfoss, East Riding of Yorkshire; England
- Coordinates: 53.9655°N 0.8621°W
- Grid reference: SE747527
- Platforms: 2

Other information
- Status: Disused

History
- Original company: York and North Midland Railway
- Pre-grouping: North Eastern Railway
- Post-grouping: London and North Eastern Railway

Key dates
- 4 October 1847: Opened
- 3 January 1959: Closed
Location

Fangfoss railway station was a station on the York to Beverley Line in the East Riding of Yorkshire, England. It opened on 4 October 1847 and served the village of Fangfoss. It closed on 3 January 1959 and much of the site is now occupied by a caravan park.

In 1987 the station was given a Grade II listed building status.

== See also ==
- Listed buildings in Fangfoss

Preceding station	Disused railways	Following station
Stamford Bridge	Y&NMR; York to Beverley Line	Yapham Gate
