= Londesborough Hall =

Country house in the East Riding of Yorkshire, England

Coordinates: 53.89830°N 0.66986°W

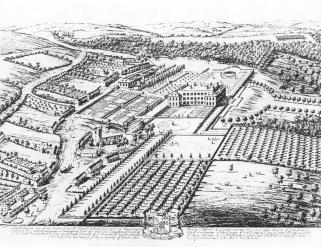
Londesborough Hall from Britannia Illustrata by Kip and Knyff (1709)

Londesborough Hall is a country house in the village of Londesborough in the East Riding of Yorkshire, England, close to the towns of Market Weighton and Pocklington.

The original Elizabethan building was demolished in 1819 and replaced by the present Victorian house.

== History ==
The Londesborough estate belonged, in the 16th and early 17th century, to the Clifford family, the Earls of Cumberland. The original house was built by George Clifford, 3rd Earl of Cumberland, in 1589, created in the Elizabethan style.

In 1643, the last Earl, Henry Clifford, 5th Earl of Cumberland died. His only child, Lady Elizabeth Clifford, had married Richard Boyle, 2nd Earl of Cork, and thus the property passed to the Boyle family. In 1664, Richard Boyle was also created 1st Earl of Burlington. Robert Hooke was engaged to enlarge the house and lay out formal gardens, between 1679 and 1683. Richard Boyle, 3rd Earl of Burlington, who was the principal patron of the Palladian movement in England, and himself a noted architect, had alterations made to Londesborough, undertaken by William Kent in the 1720s.

On the 3rd Earl's death without a male heir, in 1753, Londesborough passed to the Dukes of Devonshire, along with all his other properties, as his daughter, Lady Charlotte Boyle, had married William Cavendish, soon to be the 4th Duke of Devonshire. In 1819, the 6th Duke of Devonshire, who had a superfluity of grand homes, a large running debt inherited from his father, and many other expensive interests to pay for, including his reconstruction of Chatsworth House, had Londesborough demolished. He is said to have regretted this, and in 1839, he had a hunting box built on the estate, but in 1845, under mounting financial strain, he sold the whole Londesborough estate to the "Railway King", George Hudson. A private railway station (Londesborough Park) was built on the adjacent York to Beverley line for Hudson to use.

Hudson's questionable financial practices soon brought about his ruin, and in 1849, he sold Londesborough to the politician, Albert Denison, who was created Baron Londesborough in 1850. Denison enlarged the hunting box to create a country house in the Victorian style. His son, William Denison, later became the Earl of Londesborough.

The Victorian house survives in the ownership of Dr and Mrs Ashwin, who also own the Londesborough estate. The Yorkshire Wolds Way long-distance footpath passes through Londesborough Park, which still has open pastureland described on the walk's official site as "a delight to walk through".

== Architecture ==
=== Stables ===
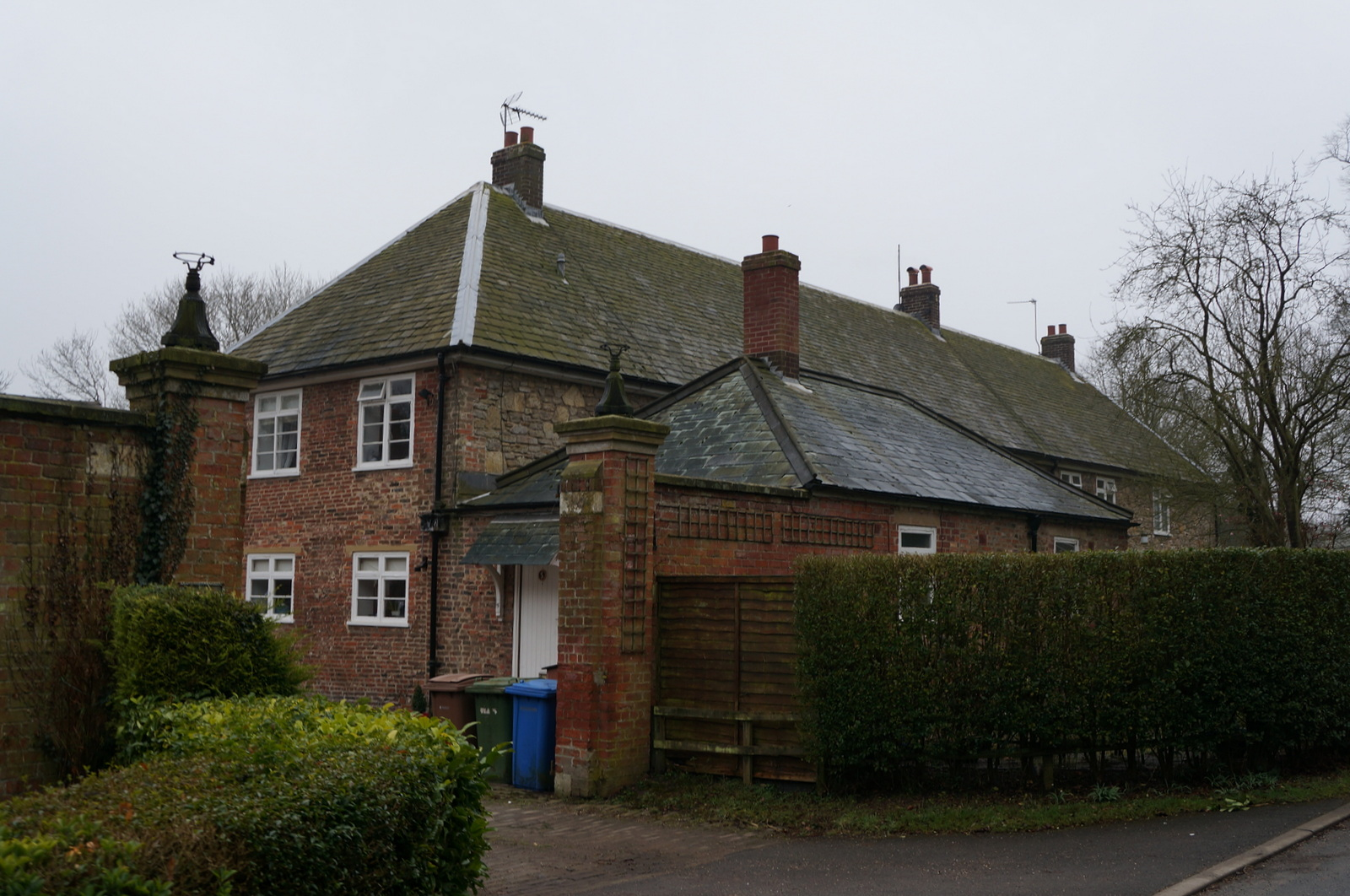
The former stables

The late-17th century stables are grade II listed and have been converted into four houses. They are built of red brick, with stone at the rear, on a chamfered plinth, with stone dressings, a moulded timber eaves cornice, and a hipped slate roof. There is one storey and seven bays. The doorway has an eared architrave, a pulvinated frieze, and a segmental pediment, flanked by full-height Ionic pilasters, carrying an entablature and a pulvinated frieze with a monogram. The windows are mullioned and transomed, in eared brick architraves.

=== Londesborough Avenue Gateway ===
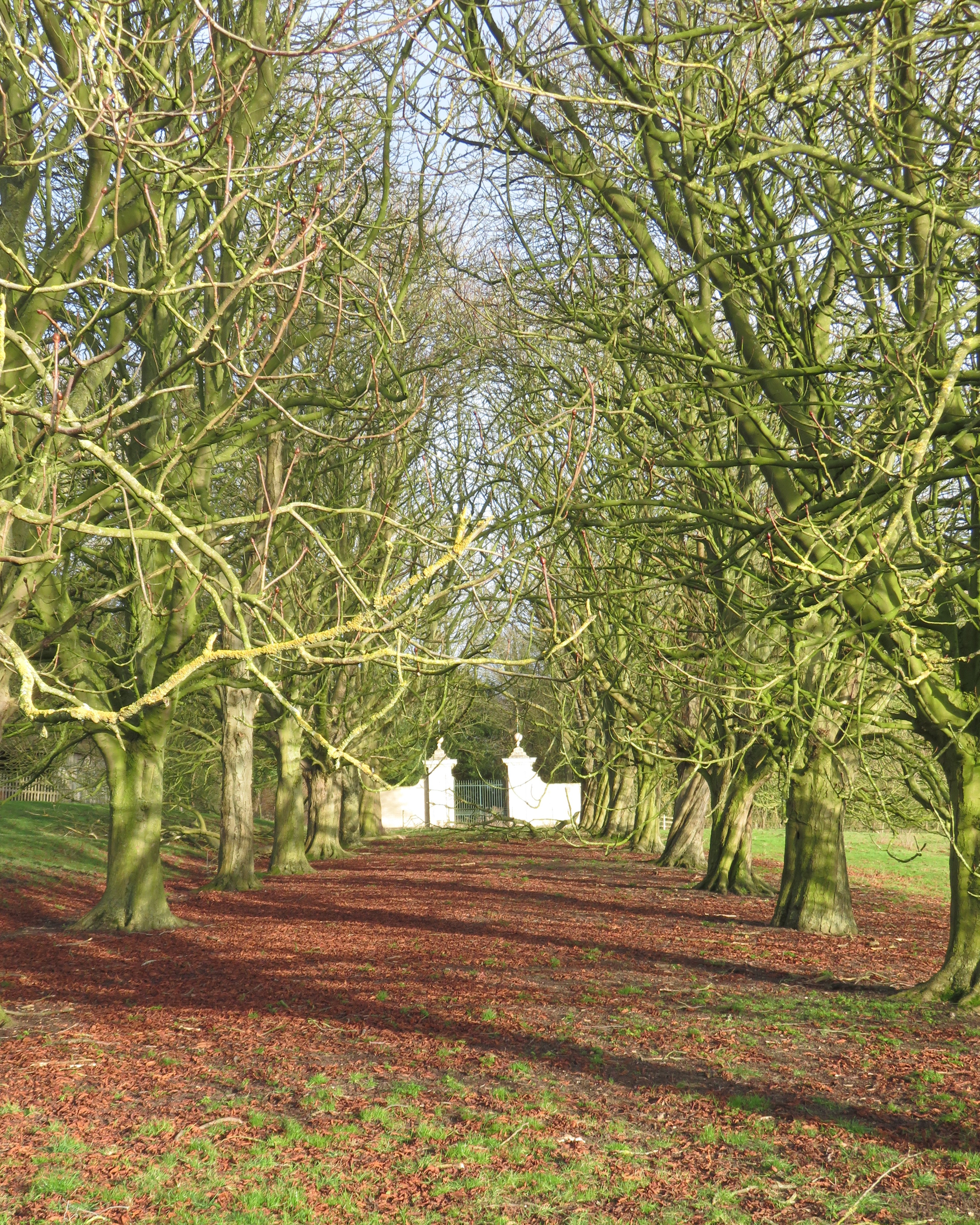
The Londesborough Avenue Gateway

The 17th-century gateway is grade I listed. The gates are in wrought iron, and the gate piers are in rendered brick. Each pier has a moulded base, sunk panels, a volute on the gate side, a deep dentilled cornice and a ball finial. The flanking walls have a moulded plinth, and coping ramped to the piers under volutes, and the abutments have moulded bases, sunk panels to the faces, and a shallow cornice.

=== Rear Gateway ===
The grade II* listed rear gateway was built in the early 18th century. The gate piers flank the entrance to the garden at the rear of the hall. They are in rusticated white limestone, with raised and fielded panels to the principal sides, and a deep moulded cornice.

=== Garden Gateway ===
The gateway to the gardens at the rear of the hall was also built in the early 18th century and is grade II listed. It is built of red brick with flagstone coping. It consists of a round-headed arch with an impost band and an archivolt, and flanking walls. The gates are in wrought iron.

== See also ==
- Grade I listed buildings in the East Riding of Yorkshire
- Listed buildings in Londesborough
