= New Earswick =

Model village and civil parish in North Yorkshire, England

Coordinates: 53.992020°N 1.072380°W

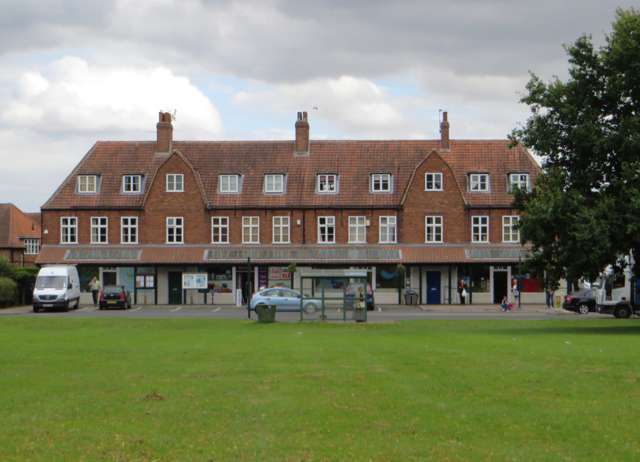
- New Earswick central shops

- Location within North Yorkshire
- Population: 2,737 (2011 census)
- OS grid reference: SE609555
- Civil parish: New Earswick
- Unitary authority: City of York
- Ceremonial county: North Yorkshire
- Region: Yorkshire and the Humber
- Country: England
- Sovereign state: United Kingdom
- Post town: YORK
- Postcode district: YO32
- Dialling code: 01904
- Police: North Yorkshire
- Fire: North Yorkshire
- Ambulance: Yorkshire
- UK Parliament: York Outer

New Earswick is a model village and civil parish in the unitary authority of City of York in North Yorkshire, England, near the River Foss, north of York and south of Haxby. According to the 2001 census the parish had a population of 2,812, reducing to 2,737 at the 2011 Census.

The village was historically part of the North Riding of Yorkshire until 1974. It was then a part of the district of Ryedale in North Yorkshire from 1974 until 1996. Since 1996 it has been part of the City of York unitary authority.

== History ==
The village of New Earswick was built as a genuine mixed community. There was housing for both workers and managers, in a green setting with gardens for each home with its own 2 fruit trees. It was founded by the York philanthropist, Joseph Rowntree, who was quoted as saying, "I do not want to establish communities bearing the stamp of charity but rather of rightly ordered and self governing communities". The first 28 houses were designed between 1902 and 1904 by the architect Raymond Unwin, after which the Joseph Rowntree Village Trust (now the Joseph Rowntree Housing Trust) was established to continue building and manage the new village. The Joseph Rowntree Housing Trust is part of the Joseph Rowntree Foundation.

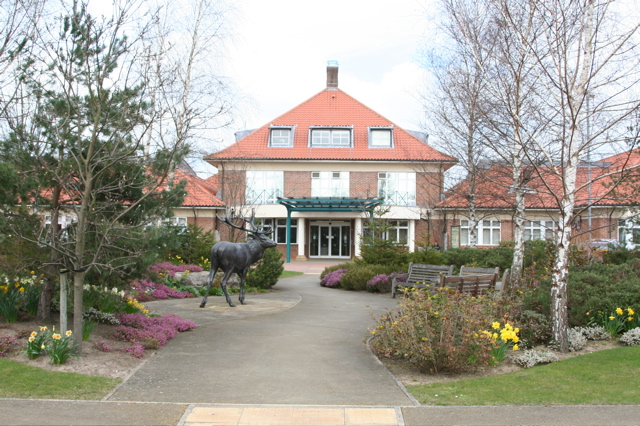
The Hartrigg Oaks Complex

The village had contemporaries such as Bournville, Saltaire, Port Sunlight and others. It presented a sharp contrast to the slums that had developed in York and other cities during the 19th century, the deprivation of which had been revealed in Seebohm Rowntree's report of 1901, entitled Poverty: a study of town life. It revealed appalling statistics of dark, overcrowded and insanitary housing.

As a result of the report, Joseph Rowntree's conviction that it must be possible to provide better housing for people on low incomes led him to acquire 150 acres of land near the village of Earswick, two and a half miles to the north of the centre of York. The planner Raymond Unwin and the architect Barry Parker were commissioned to produce an overall plan for a new 'garden' village and the detailed designs for its first houses. They also designed the garden cities of Letchworth and Welwyn Garden City.

The building of New Earswick created a balanced village community where rents were kept low, but still represented a modest commercial return on the capital invested. Houses were open to any working people, not just Rowntree employees. The village was to be a demonstration of good practice.

The Trust Deed of the Joseph Rowntree Village Trust, which was set up in 1904 to build and manage New Earswick, safeguarded generous open green space. All of the grass verges were planted with trees after which almost all of the roads are named. The village was built with bricks that were made in the brickworks on the outskirts of New Earswick. From 1950 the brickyard, which closed down in the 1930s, was developed into a nature reserve.

Their religious beliefs made the Rowntree family decreed that there would not be a public house in the village. There never has been although the Sports Club obtained a drinks licence in the 1980s.

== Governance ==
New Earswick is part of the Huntington & New Earswick Ward of the City of York Council. As of 2010 it is represented by Keith Hyman, Keith Orrel and Carol Runciman who are all members of the local Liberal Democrat Party.

A Parish Council was created in 1934 consisting of ten elected councillors and a clerk.

== Community ==
There is a local community centre, the Folk Hall, which hosts activities such as keep-fit, yoga, snooker, and a junior youth club. New Earswick has recreational facilities, including a swimming pool currently run by a charitable organisation, the Friends of New Earswick Swimming Pool, tennis courts and football, rugby and cricket pitches at the New Earswick Sports and Social Club. There were two open access play areas close to the Folk Hall, including a hard surface play area which have recently been bulldozed for a development of houses. There is a library based in the Integrated Children's Centre at the local primary school, a doctor's surgery and a range of shops, including two general stores, a pet shop and Post Office. As of 2017 the Post Office is situated within the Folk Hall.

The village has 36 allotments in two areas, Willow Bank and Sleeper Path.

In the 1960s, the Folk Hall was a live music venue featuring the likes of Procol Harum and Pink Floyd.

== Geography ==
The River Foss runs along the eastern boundary of New Earswick with the York to Scarborough Line running to the west. The Nestle factory and grounds mark the southern border with the northern border being the A1237 York Outer Ring Road. The village was built using bricks from the brickworks on the outskirts of the village. From 1950 the brickyard was developed into a nature reserve. The reserve is the home of New Earswick Angling Club, which was formed in 1948.

== Economy ==
Unlike the villages of Port Sunlight, Saltaire and Bournville the village was not designed specifically for the workforce of the nearby Joseph Rowntree Cocoa Works although some do earn their living at the factory which was taken over by Swiss firm, Nestle in 1988.

== Transport ==
Transdev York operate a bus service that stops in the village as part of the Askham Bar to Clifton Moor route. First Group operate two bus services that stop in the village as part of the Wigginton to Acomb and Haxby to York City Centre routes.

New Earswick was served by Earswick railway station on the York to Beverley Line between 1847 and 1965, the station being on the site of The Flag And Whistle pub.

== Education ==
There are both primary and secondary schools in New Earswick. New Earswick Primary School was built in 1912. The primary school is one of eight Integrated Children's Centres in York. Joseph Rowntree School is a secondary school and was built in 1941. In 2006, the Joseph Rowntree School secured £27million for a complete rebuild that was completed in late 2009. The catchment area for the secondary school is from the village itself, Huntington, The Groves and the villages of Haxby and Wigginton.

== Religious sites ==
In 1914 the Anglican church of St Andrew's was built on the edge of the parish. The church was extended in 1939 to cater for the new housing in South Huntington just across the River Foss. A Methodist chapel and meeting house for the Society of Friends were added later. St Andrew's Church is now part of the ecclesiastical parish of Huntington and New Earswick.

== Sport ==
New Earswick Cricket Club play at the recreation ground on White Rose Avenue. As of 2014 their two teams will play in Division 3 (South) and Division 4 (Central) of the York and District Senior Cricket League.

The recreation ground is shared with New Earswick All Blacks, an open age rugby league club that was founded in the 1980s and currently play in The Yorkshire Men's League Amateur Rugby League competition, in 2019–20, playing in the Premier Division (the top tier).

Steve Webster, 10 times world champion in the FIM Sidecar World Championship, was born and raised in the village.

== Gallery ==
Views of New Earswick
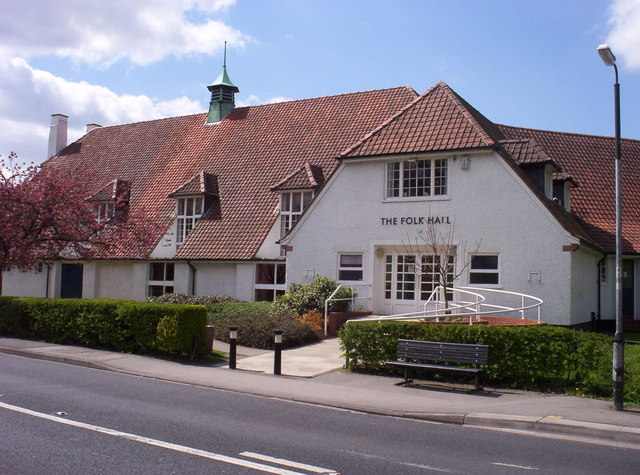
The Folk Hall in New Earswick

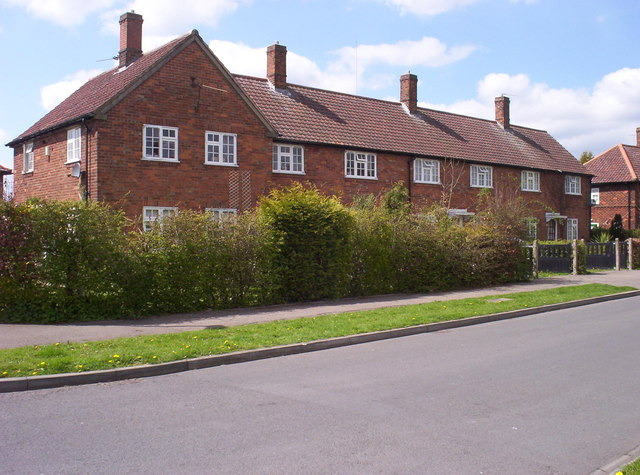
White Rose Avenue in New Earswick

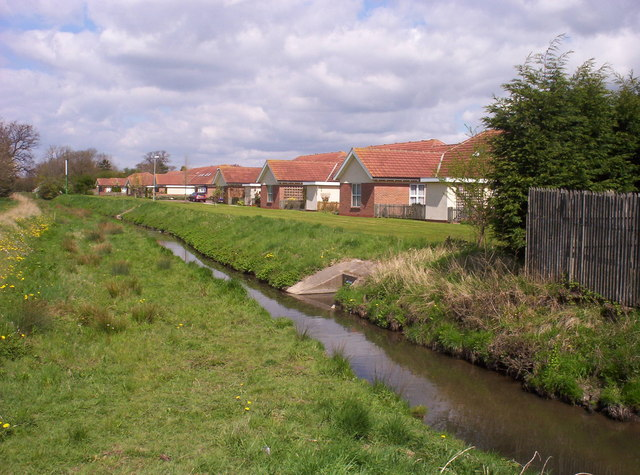
Westfield Beck behind housing on the west of New Earswick
