= Stamford Bridge railway station =

Disused railway station in the East Riding of Yorkshire, England

Stamford Bridge
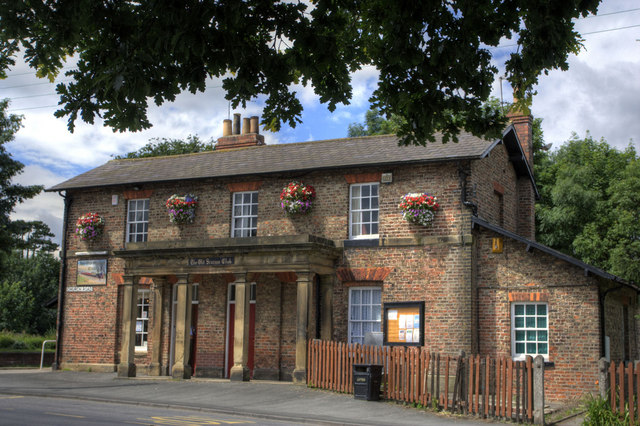

General information
- Location: Stamford Bridge, East Riding of Yorkshire; England
- Coordinates: 53.9884°N 0.9149°W
- Grid reference: SE712552
- Platforms: 3

Other information
- Status: Disused

History
- Original company: York and North Midland Railway
- Pre-grouping: North Eastern Railway
- Post-grouping: London and North Eastern Railway

Key dates
- 4 October 1847: Station opened
- 29 November 1965: Station closed to passengers
Location

Stamford Bridge railway station was a railway station on the York to Beverley Line. It opened on 4 October 1847 and served the village of Stamford Bridge in the East Riding of Yorkshire, England. It closed after the last train on 27 November 1965.

== Facilities when open ==
The station itself had three platforms: up, towards York, the west platform; down toward Beverley, the east platform, and a bay off the west side. The Station House building is on the down (East) side, consisting of two waiting rooms, and the stationmaster's office. Also on the site was a two-road goods shed, which backed onto the down platform. The large yard between the goods shed and the station building served as a holding area for goods received or pending dispatch. Stamford Bridge had a relatively short throat by NER standards; the distance between the end of the platforms and the viaduct is only about 600 yards (550 m).

== Current use ==
The station building now runs as a private members only club for residents of the village, with a bar, function room and lounge. Local groups also use the Station House as a meeting venue. The goods shed currently serves as a sports hall, after the addition of changing rooms on the south side of the building. The east yard is now a car park, the west bay platform is the village play park.

== See also ==
- Listed buildings in Stamford Bridge, East Riding of Yorkshire

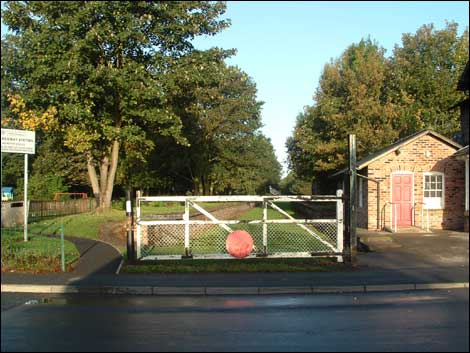
The former crossing at Stamford Bridge

Preceding station	Disused railways	Following station
Holtby	Y&NMR; York to Beverley Line	Fangfoss
