= Londesborough railway station =

Disused railway station in the East Riding of Yorkshire, England

Londesborough
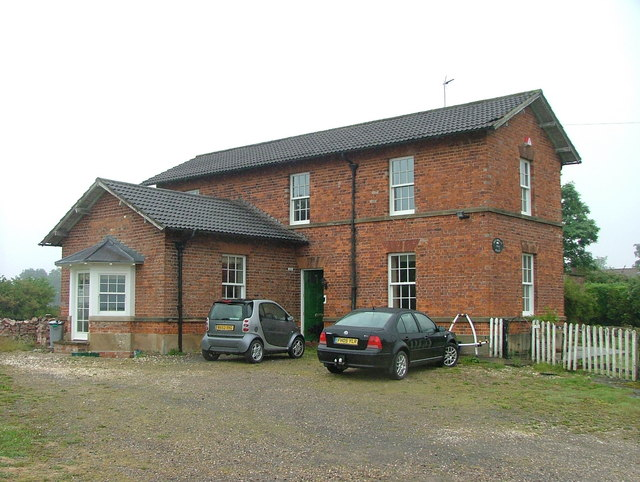
- Former station building in 2008, converted to a house

General information
- Location: Shiptonthorpe, East Riding of Yorkshire; England
- Coordinates: 53.8828°N 0.7054°W
- Grid reference: SE851437
- Platforms: 2

Other information
- Status: Disused

History
- Original company: York and North Midland Railway
- Pre-grouping: North Eastern Railway
- Post-grouping: London and North Eastern Railway; British Railways

Key dates
- 1847: Opened
- 29 November 1965: Closed
Location

Londesborough railway station was a station on the York to Beverley Line in the East Riding of Yorkshire, England. It opened on 4 October 1847 and served the villages of Shiptonthorpe and Londesborough. The station was originally named Shipton & Londesborough, was renamed to Shipton in April 1864 and became Londesborough in January 1867. It closed after the last train ran on 27 November 1965.

Preceding station	Disused railways	Following station
Londesborough Park	Y&NMR; York to Beverley Line	Market Weighton
