= Cherry Burton railway station =

Disused railway station in the East Riding of Yorkshire, England

Cherry Burton
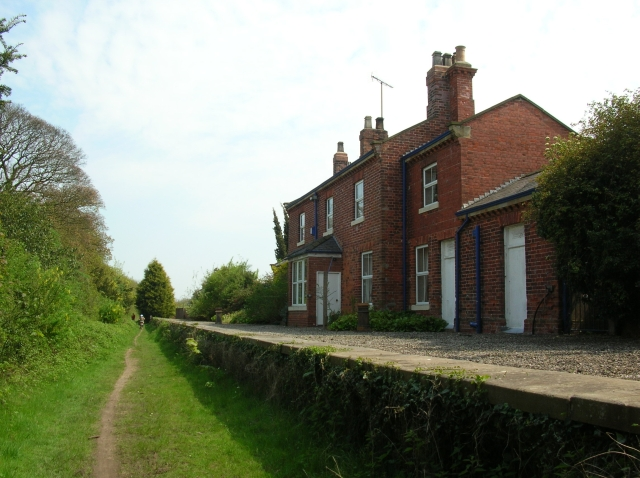

General information
- Location: Cherry Burton, East Riding of Yorkshire; England
- Coordinates: 53.869830°N 0.493440°W
- Grid reference: SE991425
- Platforms: 2

Other information
- Status: Disused

History
- Original company: North Eastern Railway
- Pre-grouping: North Eastern Railway
- Post-grouping: London and North Eastern Railway

Key dates
- 1865: Opened
- 1959: Closed
Location

Cherry Burton railway station was a railway station on the York to Beverley Line in the East Riding of Yorkshire, England. It opened on 1 May 1865 and served the village of Cherry Burton in the East Riding of Yorkshire, England. It closed on 5 January 1959.

| Preceding station | Disused railways | Following station |
|---|---|---|
| Kiplingcotes | North Eastern Railway | Beverley |
