= Yapham Gate railway station =

Disused railway station in the East Riding of Yorkshire, England

Yapham Gate

General information
- Location: Yapham, East Riding of Yorkshire; England
- Coordinates: 53.9482°N 0.8234°W
- Grid reference: SE774509

Other information
- Status: Disused

History
- Original company: York and North Midland Railway

Key dates
- 4 October 1847: Opened
- April 1865: Closed
Location

Yapham Gate railway station was a station on the York to Beverley Line in the East Riding of Yorkshire, England. It opened on 4 October 1847 and served the village of Yapham. It was short lived and closed in April 1865.

Preceding station	Disused railways	Following station
Fangfoss	Y&NMR; York to Beverley Line	Pocklington
