= Holtby =

Village and civil parish in North Yorkshire, England

Coordinates: 53.97945°N 0.97280°W

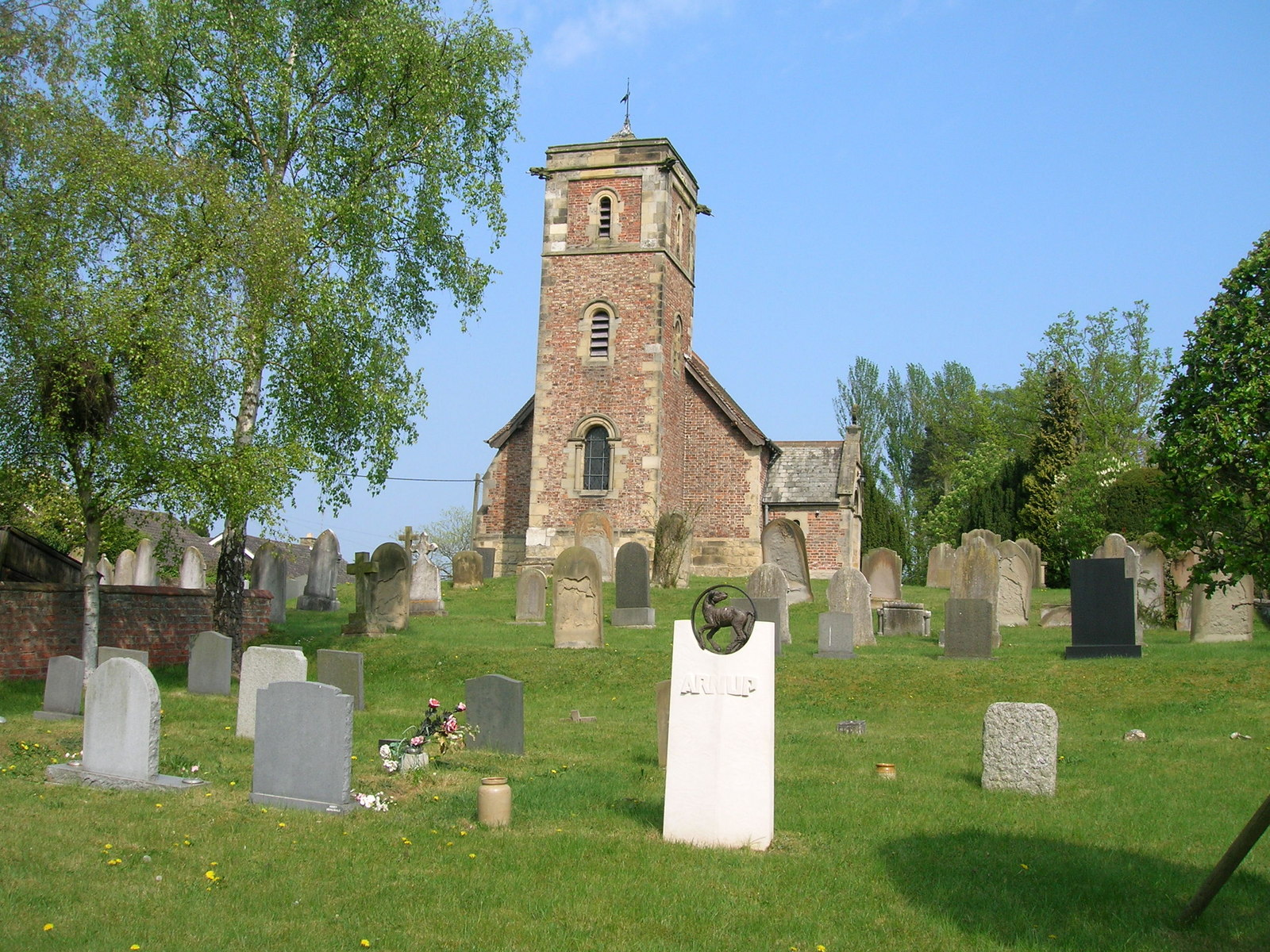
- Holy Trinity Church

- Location within North Yorkshire
- Population: 166 (2011 census)
- OS grid reference: SE674541
- Civil parish: Holtby
- Unitary authority: City of York
- Ceremonial county: North Yorkshire
- Region: Yorkshire and the Humber
- Country: England
- Sovereign state: United Kingdom
- Post town: YORK
- Postcode district: YO19
- Police: North Yorkshire
- Fire: North Yorkshire
- Ambulance: Yorkshire
- UK Parliament: York Outer

Holtby is a small village and civil parish in the unitary authority of the City of York in North Yorkshire, England. The population at the 2011 Census was 166. It lies close to the A166 about 5 miles (8 km) east of York.

== History ==
The name Holtby derives from the Old Norse Holtibȳ meaning 'Holti's village'.

The village is mentioned in the Domesday Book as Boltebi in the Bulford hundred in the possession of the King.

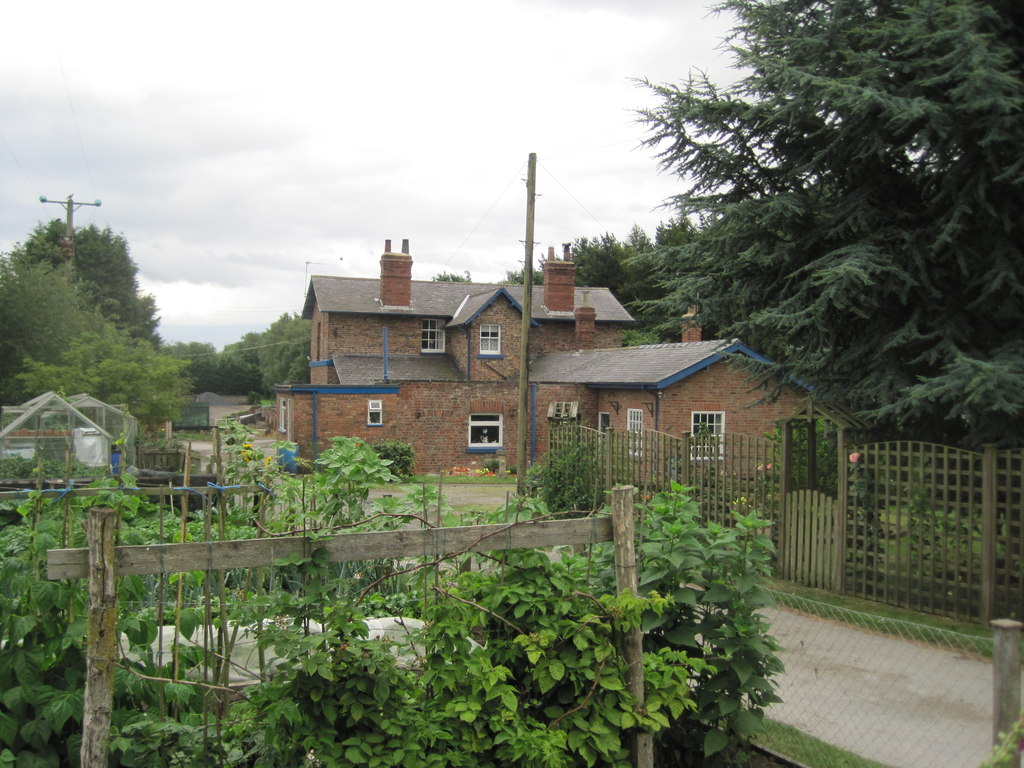
Holtby Railway station (site)

Holtby was served by Holtby railway station on the York to Beverley Line between 1847 and 1939.

The village was historically part of the North Riding of Yorkshire until 1974. It was then a part of the district of Ryedale in North Yorkshire from 1974 until 1996. Since 1996 it has been part of the City of York unitary authority.

== Governance ==
The village lies within the York Outer UK Parliament constituency and the Derwent ward of the York Unitary Authority. The local Parish Council has five members.

== Geography ==
The 1881 UK Census recorded the population as 136. According to the 2001 census the parish had a population of 152, of which 111 were over sixteen years of age and 67 of those were in employment. There were 69 dwellings, of which 61 were detached.

The nearest settlements are Warthill 0.6 miles (0.97 km) to the north, Gate Helmsley 1.25 miles (2.01 km) to the north-east and Dunnington 1.1 miles (1.8 km) to the south. Osbaldwick Beck flows through the village.

In addition to the church, there are six other Grade II Listed Buildings within the village.

== Religion ==
There is a Grade II listed church in the village dedicated to the Holy Trinity which was rebuilt in 1792 and repaired in 1841 and 1881. It is largely of brick.

== Notable people ==
- Philip Bower (1898–1978), cricketer
