= York–Beverley line =

Former English railway line

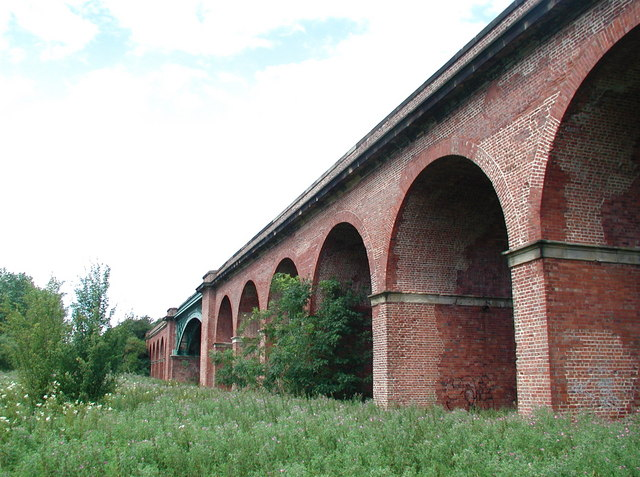
- Stamford Bridge Viaduct and approaches (2008)

Overview
- Status: Closed
- Locale: Yorkshire

History
- Opened: York to Market Weighton, 1847; Market Weighton to Beverley, 1865
- Closed: 1965

Technical
- Track length: 21.5 mi (34.6 km); York to Market Weighton; 11 mi (18 km); Market Weighton to Beverley
- Track gauge: 4 ft 8 1/2 in (1,435 mm) standard gauge

The York–Beverley line was a railway line between York, Market Weighton and Beverley in Yorkshire, England. The line was sanctioned in 1846 and the first part, the York to Market Weighton Line opened in 1847. Construction of the second part to Beverley was delayed for 17 years in part by the downfall of George Hudson, and a less favourable financial environment following the collapse of the 1840s railway bubble; the North Eastern Railway revived and completed the scheme in the 1860s; the Market Weighton to Beverley Line opened in 1865.

The line left the York and Scarborough Railway at a junction north of York and turned eastward, crossing the largely flat terrain of the Vale of York via Stamford Bridge, Pocklington and Market Weighton before making its way over hillier ground via a gap in the Yorkshire Wolds, between Market Weighton and Goodmanham; the line then ran steadily downhill to the River Hull valley past Cherry Burton to a junction with the Hull to Scarborough Line at Beverley.

Market Weighton became the junction of two other railways, the Selby to Market Weighton line, sanctioned at the same time as the original York-Beverley scheme, and opened in 1848; and the Scarborough, Bridlington and West Riding Junction Railway (Market Weighton to Driffield), opened in 1890.

The line once was a preferred route for trains running directly between the English cities of York and Kingston upon Hull. Before closure the route Hull–Beverley–Market Weighton–York had daily direct trains and was often referred to as the Hull to York line.

The line was recommended for closure in the 1963 Beeching report and closed in November 1965.

== History ==
=== Background ===
By the mid 1840s lines had been constructed from Leeds to Selby (Leeds and Selby Railway, 1834), Selby to Hull (Hull and Selby Railway, 1840) and from Hull to Beverley and Bridlington (Hull and Selby Railway, Bridlington branch, 1846), all of which were owned or leased by George Hudson's York and North Midland Railway.

In early 1845 the Hull and Selby Railway had authorised surveys for a line from its Bridlington branch via Market Weighton and Pocklington to York connection with a junction on either the Great North of England Railway or the York and North Midland Railway, as well as another branch to Market Weighton from its main line. On 17 May 1845 after being approached by interested parties from Beverley, the York and Midland shareholders agreed to proceed with surveys for the line and its branch. A rival scheme, promoted by the York, Hull and East and West Yorkshire Junction Railway running from a related proposed scheme at York, the Leeds and York Railway spurred the Y&NMR to the promotion of parliamentary bill in 1845 for the Beverley–Market Weighton–York line, as well as other railways in East Yorkshire. An act, the York and North Midland Railway (East Riding Branches) (No. 1) Act 1846 (9 & 10 Vict. c. lxv) was obtained. (Note: York and North Midland Railway (East Riding Branches) [No.1] Act (Victoria 9 & 10, Cap. 65, 1846); An Act for enabling the York and North Midland Railway to make certain branch Railways in the East Riding of the county of York; and for other purposes.)

George Hudson also acquired the Londesborough Hall estate for £474,000 in an attempt to prevent landowners on the line causing problems for the railway.

As part of the agreements needed to obtain the passage of the East Riding branches acts through Parliament the Y&NMR had to make agreements buy out the proprietors of the Pocklington Canal, Market Weighton Canal, its branch Sir Edward Vavasour's Canal and the Leven Canal. The Y&NMR began proceedings to obtain an act to that effect in 1846, which was passed as the York and North Midland Railway (Canals Purchase) Act 1847 (10 & 11 Vict. c. ccxvi) in 1847. (Note: York and North Midland Railway (Canals Purchase) Act (Victoria 10 & 11, Cap. 216, 1847); An Act to authorize the Purchase by the York and North Midland Railway Company of the Interests of the Shareholders in the Market Weighton Canal, and the Purchase of the Canal communicating therewith called Sir Edward Vavasour’s Canal, of the Pocklington Canal, and of the Leven Canal, all in the East Riding of the County of York.) The Leven canal was to be acquired in case of the Y&NMR constructing a Hornsea branch, the others were necessary for the lines to Market Weighton, and were bought at £18,000; £14,404 5s 10d; and £836 15s (1/15 of the price of its parent) respectively.

=== York to Market Weighton (1846–1865) ===
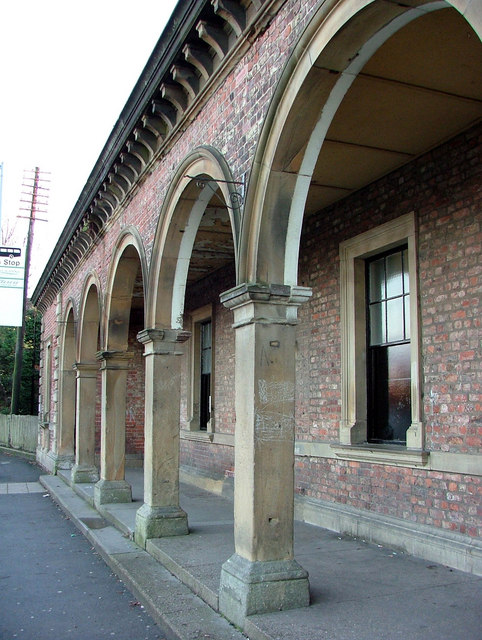
Entrance arcade at Pocklington station (2007)

Construction of the line was contracted to Jackson and Bean for £116,009; (Note: Jackson and Bean were also contractors on the Selby to Market Weighton line (1847), and on the Hull and Selby Railway (Bridlington branch)) Buildings on the line were designed by G. T. Andrews and constructed by Burton and Son. Lesser stations generally consisted of two platforms, either parallel or staggered at a road crossing, with a two storey station houses, with a bay window overlooking the platform, the larger ones had a stone pillared portico at one of the entrances. The main stations (Pocklington and Market Weighton) had two platforms under an overall hipped roof trainshed, with single storey station buildings adjacent and parallel to the shed, (Note: A design used elsewhere by Andrews, including Filey, Driffield, and Beverley.) with the entrance distinguished again by a stone pillared portico, or at Pocklington, by an arched arcade. Market Weighton had a two road engine shed, with turntable. Other buildings included goods sheds, coal drops, and gatehouses/platelayers cottages which were typically single storey buildings with distinctive double chimneys with arched brick saddles connecting the stack. George Hudson had a private station for Londesborough Hall.

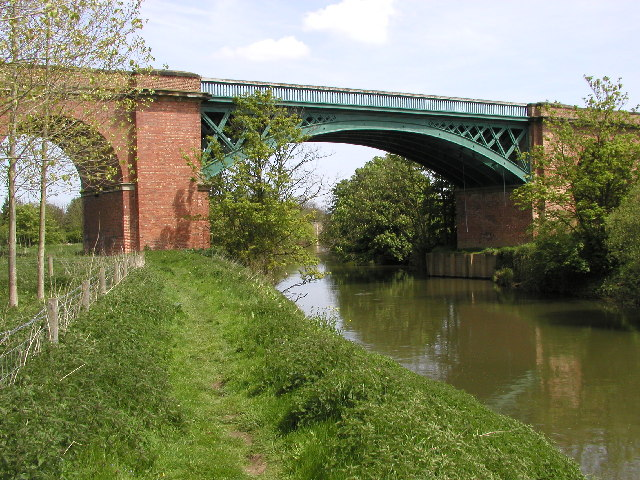
The 1846 cast iron bridge across the Derwent (2005)

The only bridge of note on the section was the Stamford Bridge Viaduct crossing the River Derwent. The viaduct consisted of 24 feet (7.3 m) span semicircular brick approach arches, 10 on the southeast side, and 5 on the northwest side, with a 90 feet (27 m) cast iron span over the river. The iron work was erected by Gilkes Wilson and Company to a design by J. C. Birkinshaw; it consisted of six cast iron spandrel arched ribs, each made of five sections bolted together; with the ribs cross braced by spandrils; the weight of the iron work bridge was over 260 long tons (260 t).

The line was completed on 4 October 1847. The line was constructed as double track, 21.5 miles (34.6 km) long, at a total cost of £380,000, with gradients were generally light with maximum of 1 in 171 and 1 in 191, most of the line was built with gradient of 1:200 to 1:300 or better; there were peaks of 96 and 111 feet (29 and 34 m) elevation near Holtby and Pocklington.

The Selby to Market Weighton line opened on 1 August 1848 with a junction on the line west of Market Weighton station. Three trains per day ran each way on the York to Market Weighton Line (1847), and the same number on the contemporary line to Driffield; coaches operated from Market Weighton to Beverley.

In 1848–49 costs per year for the line were estimated at: sleepers and rails, £1,481 and £522; maintenance wages £881 8s (22 employees); signalling, goods and coaching department wages, (30 employees), £1,200 12s; (Note: "Coaching" refers to passengers, parcels, horse, carriage and mail transport.) and a very rough estimate of £70 per mile for works and building maintenance.

Total working charges on the line, including maintenance, wages, depreciation, insurance, rents, train running costs, sundries and administration was £7,808. Receipts in the first 12 months after opening were £971 (coaching), £1,335 (freight), plus rents to a total of £2,336. the total train miles in the first half of 1849 was 22,793 and 6,949 for passenger and goods trains respectively. (Note: These figures correspond to, very roughly 6 full journeys along the line per day.)

In 1855 the basic service was still three trains per day with the stopping service taking 75 minutes. Yapham Gate was a scheduled stop on Market days.

=== Extension to Beverley ===
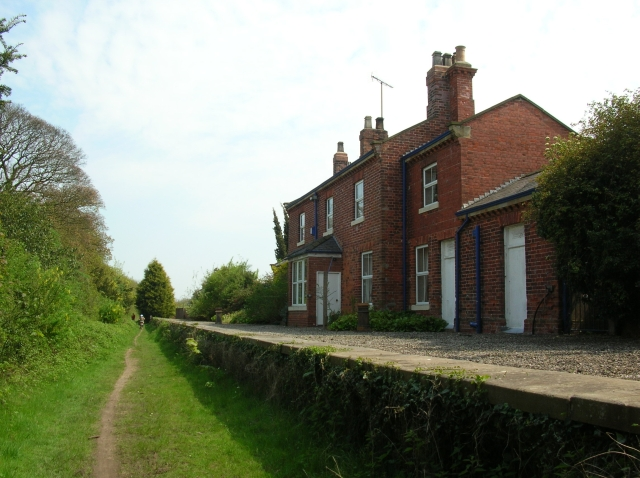
Cherry Burton railway station, platform and public footpath (2008)

The compulsory purchase powers of the York and North Midland Railway (East Riding Branches) (No. 1) Act 1846 were to expire after three years, with the powers to construct a railway expiring after five; in 1849 the Y&NMR applied for, and obtained a second act of Parliament, the York and North Midland Railway Act 1849 (12 & 13 Vict. c. lx), authorising the abandonment and replacement of the authorised section of the line from Market Weighton to Cherry Burton with a deviation between the same points. (Note: The York and North-midland railway act, 1849 (Cap. 60); An Act for enabling the York and North Midland Railway Company to divert their Railways between Market Weighton and Beverley and Copmanthorpe and Tadcaster, all in the County of York; and for other purposes.) The act also extended the original 1846 act of Parliaments's duration of compulsory purchase and construction by two and five years respectively.

As a result of the York and North Midland Railway's inquiry into George Hudson's fraud the company found itself needing to reduce expenditure; and construction of the Market Weighton to Beverley section was postponed. In 1851 two landowners brought a case against the Y&NMR, attempting to compel them to construct the Market Weighton to Cherry Burton Section; the court (Queen's Bench) found in the plaintiffs' favour, but the decision was rejected as erroneous on appeal to the Court of Exchequer Chamber; the court ruled that the York and North Midland Railway Act 1849 used permissive (and not imperative) terms and so the company was not compelled to complete the line.

North-eastern Railway Company's (Beverley Branch) Act 1862
- Act of Parliament
- Parliament of the United Kingdom
- Citation: 25 & 26 Vict. c. lxxxv

In 1862 the Y&NMR's successor the North Eastern Railway applied to renew the powers to build the line to Beverley, local interests raised £40,000 towards the cost of the line through the purchase of NER stock. An act, the North-eastern Railway Company's (Beverley Branch) Act 1862 (25 & 26 Vict. c. lxxxv), was obtained. (Note: North Eastern Railway (Beverley Branch), 1862 (Cap. 85); An Act to enable the North-eastern Railway Company to construct Branch Railways from Market Weighton to Beverley and at Hull; to raise additional Capital; and for other Purposes.)

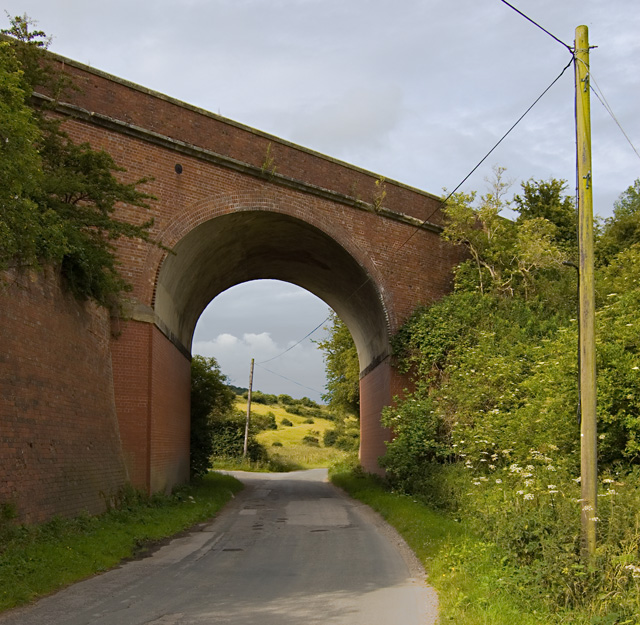
Skew bridge on Goodmanham to Etton road (2009)

The line ran roughly east-northeast out of Market Weighton, turning eastward towards Goodmanham; here the ground was boggy and prone to springs; the line ran on the bed of a diverted stream; there was a skew bridge east of Goodmanham, followed by a climb into the Yorkshire Wolds towards Kiplingcotes, a third of which was at a gradient of 1 in 160, with a peak east of Kiplingcotes at 184 feet (56 m). Beyond the peak of the wolds the line ran east to Cherry Burton, then roughly southeast to Beverley; from the peak to Beverley the route was downhill, with gradients between 1:161 and 1:185. Most of the roads were crossed by bridge or underpassed, with the exception of Pighill crossing outside Beverley.

The 11-mile (18 km) branch was opened on 1 May 1865; the line was built as a single track line, with a double track section at Kiplingcotes.

=== Operations (1865–1965) ===
After the opening of the Beverley section in 1865 trains could run through from York to Hull; by 1870 the standard service had also increased to four trains per day; additionally an express train running from Hull and connecting at York for the express to Scotland had to be run, stopping only at the main stations: Beverley, Market Weighton, Pocklington and Stamford Bridge.

In 1890 the Scarborough, Bridlington and West Riding Junction Railway from Market Weighton to Driffield opened, with a junction on the line to Beverley just east of Market Weighton station, at East junction.

By 1895 the service had increased to six trains per day each way, of which all but one were stopping services; by 1910 the service had reached eight trains each way. During the First World War service were reduced, recovering to pre-war levels in the 1920s; through trains also began to run from Hull to Newcastle using the line. In the 1930s a Sunday train began to run on the line, an excursion service from York to the coast at Bridlington. The level-crossing on the busy York to Scarborough turnpike road (later A64) was grade separated in the 1930s.

Holtby station closed for passengers in September 1939. Service were reduced again during the Second World War and recovered post war. Nunburnholme station closed to passengers, goods service to Holtby ended in 1951, whilst the station roof at Market Weighton had been removed and replaced with steel awnings in around 1948.

Diesel multiple units were introduced on the line in 1957. Warthill, Fangfoss and Cherry Burton railway stations were closed to passengers in 1959.

At the beginning of the 1960s nine trains per day ran each way, including expresses.

=== Modernisation and closure (1955–65) ===
In the around 1955 British Railways started investigating the use of boom barriers as a replacement for traditional gates, and an experimental installation was made at the level-crossing at Warthill, controlled from a nearby signal box.

In 1960 British Rail began work on converting the line to a Centralised Traffic Control (CTC) system, (Note: Also known a Centralised Train Control.) involving singling the line, with passing loops at Pocklington and Market Weighton; modernisation of level crossings; colour light signalling installed; and removal of signal control to a single signal box at Bootham junction, York.

The CTC was halted with the publication of the Beeching Report of 1963, which recommended that the passenger service on the line ("York-Hull via Beverley") cease, with all stations to be closed. The line was one of the case studies given in the report; which calculated expenses of £107,500 on an income of £90,400, and estimated that additional savings would be obtained after closure, with over a quarter of the revenue retained by re-routing of through (Hull-York) services.

Goods service ended at Kiplingcoates and Cherry Burton in 1964, and at Londesborough, Earswick, Stamford Bridge and Fangfoss in 1965. Goods services at Pocklington were still actively used and BR North-Eastern proposed schemes to retain the section of the line from Beverley, or from Market Weighton via the Selby to Market Weighton line. The change of government to Labour after the 1964 general election failed to halt the closure, despite some expectations that the closures would be halted and services on the line were withdrawn in November 1965 with the last train running on 27 November 1965.

== Stations and landmarks ==
The completed route left the Y&NMR's York to Scarborough Line at Bootham Junction north of York and at the other end joined its Hull to Bridlington Line at a junction north of Beverley. Market Weighton station became the location of the junction between the York to Beverley Line and the Selby to Market Weighton line (1848), and the Market Weighton to Driffield line (Scarborough, Bridlington and West Riding Junction Railway, SB&WRJR). The entire route had been double-tracked by 1890 with the opening SB&WRJR.

Of the 13 intermediate stations between York and Beverley, only six (Earswick, Stamford Bridge, Pocklington, Londesborough, Market Weighton and Kiplingcotes) were still open when the line closed in 1965.

Feature	Opened	Closed	Notes
Bootham junction	1847		53.98041°N 1.08167°W Junction with the York to Scarborough Line
Earswick station	4 October 1847	29 November 1965	53.989670°N 1.066870°W For the villages of Huntington and New Earswick. Before 1874 named Huntington station.
Warthill station	4 October 1847	5 January 1959	54.0053°N 0.9849°W For the villages of Stockton-on-the-Forest and Warthill. Former terminus of the Sand Hutton Light Railway. Before 1872 known as Stockton Forest or Stockton-on-Forest, and before 1867 Stockton.
Holtby station	4 October 1847	11 September 1939	53.9962°N 0.9400°W For the villages of Gate Helmsley and Holtby. Before 1872 named Gate Helmsley
Stamford Bridge Viaduct			53.98987°N 0.92072°W 15 brick arches, and a cast iron central span over the River Derwent
Stamford Bridge station	4 October 1847	29 November 1965	53.9884°N 0.9149°W
Fangfoss station	4 October 1847	5 January 1959	53.9655°N 0.8621°W
Yapham Gate railway station	4 October 1847	April 1865	53.94823°N 0.82337°W Short lived station at gated road crossing
Pocklington station	4 October 1847	29 November 1965	53.9292°N 0.7810°W
Nunburnholme station	4 October 1847	1 April 1951	53.90626°N 0.73360°W For the villages of Nunburnholme and Burnby. Before 1873 known as Burnby
Londesborough Park station		January 1867	53.88794°N 0.71348°W Station built for George Hudson at Londesborough Hall
Londesborough station	4 October 1847	29 November 1965	53.88284°N 0.70540°W Originally Shipton and Londesborough, after 1864 Shipton, after 1867 Londesborough
West junction	1848		53.86694°N 0.66902°W Junction with Selby to Market Weighton line
Market Weighton station	4 October 1847	29 November 1965	53.86782°N 0.66498°W Station for York, Beverley, Driffield and Selby (Barlby) lines. Demolished 1975.
East junction	1890		53.86836°N 0.66158°W Junction with the Scarborough, Bridlington and West Riding Junction Railway (Market Weighton to Driffield)
Skew bridge			53.88354°N 0.59188°W
Kiplingcotes station	1 May 1865	29 November 1965	53.88321°N 0.58783°W Originally built for Lord Hotham as part of the arrangement for him not opposing the line's construction
Cherry Burton station	1 May 1865	5 January 1959	53.86983°N 0.49344°W
Beverley junction	1865		53.85110°N 0.42425°W Junction with the Hull to Scarborough Line
Sources: Individual linked articles, or text, except where noted.

== Post closure ==
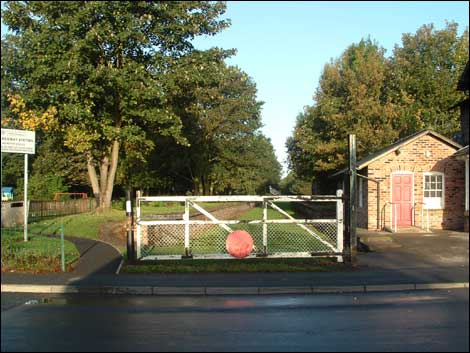
The former station at Stamford Bridge (2006)

As of 2015, much of the former trackbed is still extant, with exceptions within the towns of Pocklington, Stamford Bridge and the York urban area where building development has taken place. The heavier engineering works east of Market Weighton are more visible, whilst west in the Vale of York parts of the line are no longer evidenced on the ground, more than half of the route is discernible as earthworks or field boundaries. The route between Beverley and Market Weighton has been converted into a cycleway, Hudson Way (also known as Wilberforce Way).

Many of the line's structures are still extant; exceptions include the station buildings at Market Weighton demolished in 1979, as well as Earswick station, also demolished.

At Stamford Bridge the station house and platforms survive, as does the goods shed. In 1990, the listed iron bridge and viaduct over the River Derwent at Stamford Bridge was proposed for demolition by the East Riding of Yorkshire Council on the grounds that it needed £100,000-worth of repairs. It was refused in 1992 following a campaign by both enthusiasts and local people.

At Pocklington the station, station master's house, and station goods shed are all still extant, and are listed structures. Several other station buildings survive, including Fangfoss, Warthill, Holtby, Nunburnholme, Londesborough, Cherry Burton, and Kiplingcotes.

Two of the former gate keepers cottages are now Grade II listed buildings, Market Weighton and Barmby Moor.

=== Re-opening proposals ===
A group, the Minsters' Rail Campaign, was established in 2001 to promote the re-opening of the line.

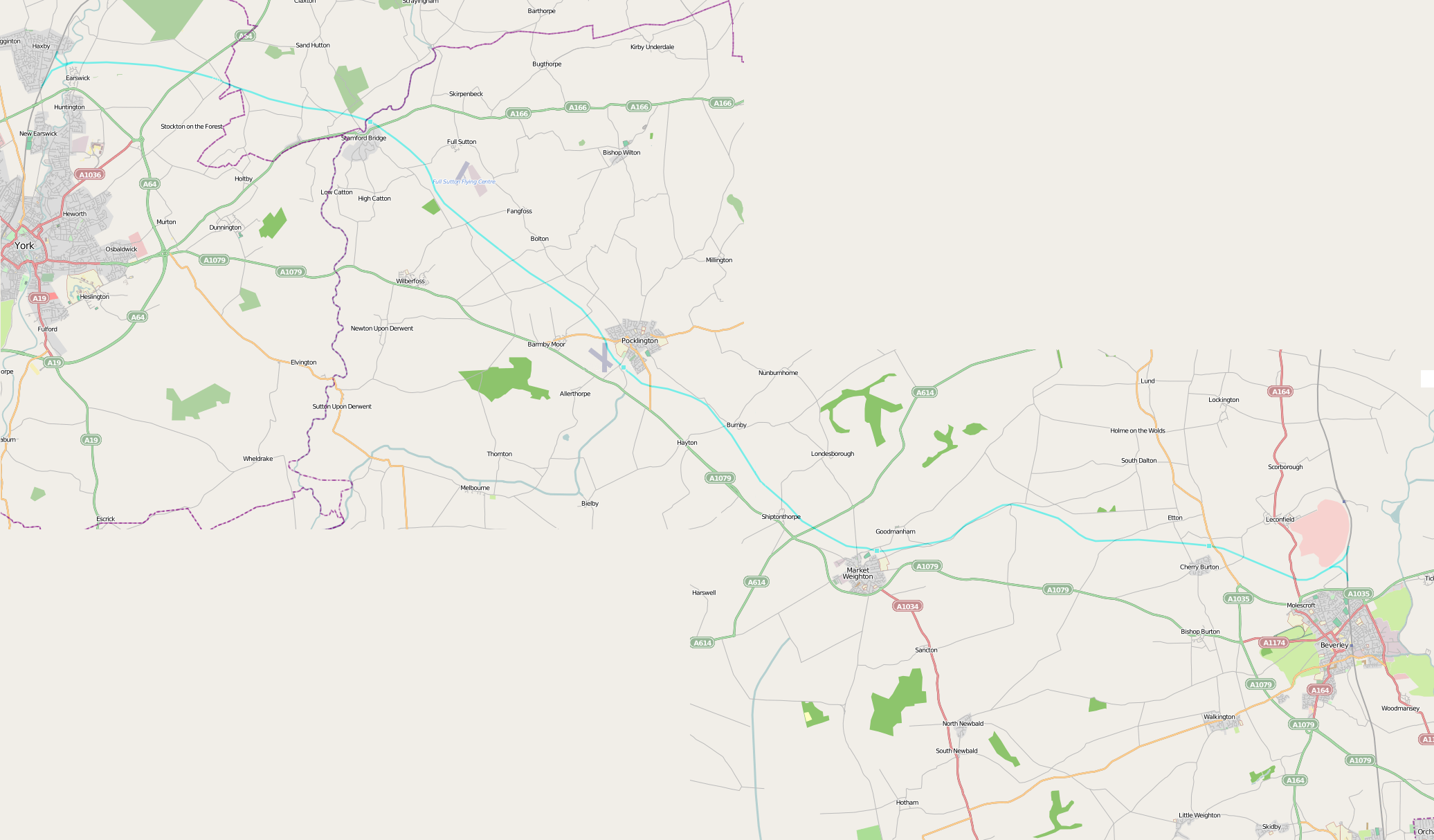
Possible route of reopened line

In 2004 the East Riding of Yorkshire Council commissioned a report from Carl Bro Group to investigate the feasibility of re-opening the line. Because of redevelopment, alterations to the former route were considered – developments in York (housing in Huntington and New Earswick) required the connection to the York to Scarborough Line to be moved north; an alternative route via the former Derwent Valley Light Railway and the Foss Islands branch into the centre of York was also considered. Building development had also taken place on the track bed in Pocklington, Stamford Bridge; with alternative alignments proposed, going around the outskirts of the towns. A new alignment of the track out of Beverley was also proposed to the close proximity of properties, traffic levels at level crossings and other developments.

The study found benefits to opening the line for passenger traffic, both for commuter and leisure traffic, but found no practical uses of the line for freight. The report recommended reinstating a service from Hull via Beverley, Market Weighton, Stamford Bridge and Pocklington connecting to the York to Scarborough Line at Haxby, on a double track line with a frequency of 2 trains per hour, with intermediate stations only at Market Weighton, Pocklington and Stamford Bridge. The estimate journey time was under 1 hour. Capital costs of the scheme were estimated at £239 million, with operating costs at £2.9 million pa; additional direct revenue from a bi-hourly service was estimated £0.257 million per annum; the scheme was not expected to be profitable and would require a subsidy from government.

In economic terms, the project is estimated at cost of £239 million, and the present value of benefits of the scheme are estimated at greater than the total value of the costs with a Benefit Cost Ratio of between 1.26 and 2.04. Whilst following construction, the fare revenues will not exceed the total running and maintenance costs on the new line, the environmental benefits, benefits to traffic using the A1079 and A166, and the time savings for passengers and other non user benefits make the scheme economic.

— Carl Bro Group Ltd (2004, §19.0)

The 2011 East Riding of Yorkshire Council (ERYC) transport plan identified the re-opening of the line as a long-term goal, and safeguarded the route from development. In 2013 ERYC published a draft local plan which allowed building on the line, and excluded re-instatement of the rail line from its schemes as it had concluded that the scheme would not be realistically deliverable within the plan's 20 year timeframe.

The idea of re-instating the railway line between Beverley and York is very clearly currently unaffordable under any source of funding of which we are aware.

— Symon Fraser, East Riding Councillor, 2013.

Following the government's plans to reinstate lines closed in the 1960s which was announced in November 2017, it was proposed that the line could reopen. In January 2019, the Campaign for Better Transport released a report identifying the line which was listed as Priority 2 for reopening. Priority 2 is for those lines which require further development or a change in circumstances (such as housing developments). In June 2020, the East Riding of Yorkshire Council submitted a request for funding to cover a feasibility study which would investigate reopening the line.

In 2021, as a part of the government's Restoring Your Railway programme, the Government committed to "restoring the York – Beverley" line, but no further progress has been made as of late 2023 and no timeframe is clear. Due to the scrapping of the Phase 2 of the HS2 project, £19,8 billion have been freed for infrastructure in the North with the Network North plan which regional MPs hope can be used for the restoring of the railway.
