= Market Weighton railway station =

Disused railway station in the East Riding of Yorkshire, England

Market Weighton
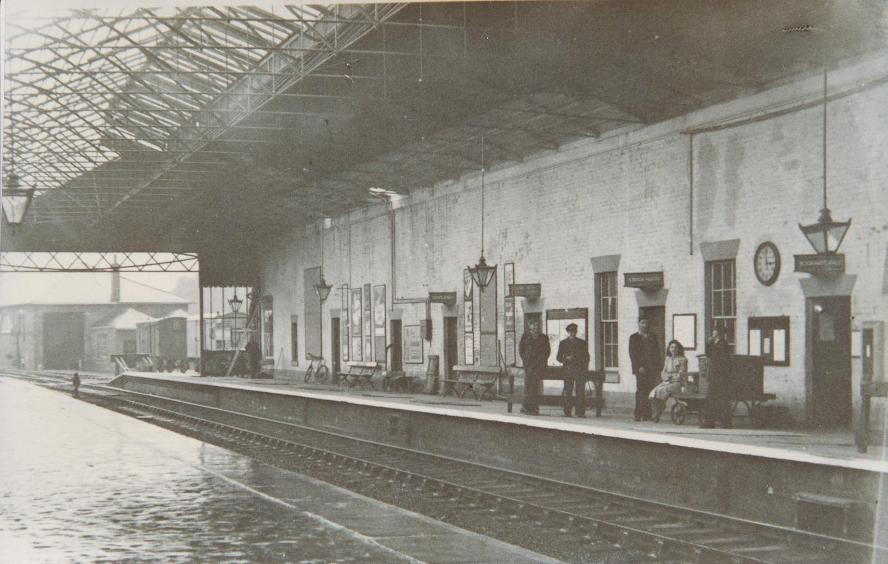
- Station in 1940

General information
- Location: Market Weighton, East Riding of Yorkshire; England
- Coordinates: 53.867815°N 0.664976°W
- Grid reference: SE878421
- Platforms: 2

Other information
- Status: Disused

History
- Original company: York and North Midland Railway
- Pre-grouping: North Eastern Railway
- Post-grouping: London and North Eastern Railway; British Railways

Key dates
- 1847: opened
- 29 November 1965: closed
Location

Market Weighton railway station was a railway station at the junction of the Selby to Driffield and York to Beverley lines in the East Riding of Yorkshire, England.

== History ==
It opened on 4 October 1847 and served the town of Market Weighton. The overall roof of the station was removed in 1947 and replaced with steel awnings. It closed after the last train ran on 27 November 1965, and the station buildings were demolished in 1979.

Preceding station	Disused railways	Following station
Everingham	Y&NMR / SB&WRJR; Selby to Driffield Line	Enthorpe
Londesborough	Y&NMR; York to Beverley Line	Kiplingcotes
