= Huntington, North Yorkshire =

Village and civil parish in York, England

Coordinates: 53.992629°N 1.043024°W

Huntington
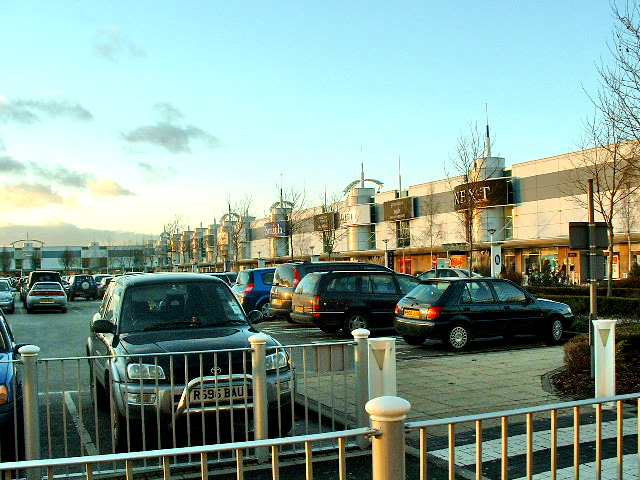
- Monks Cross Shopping Centre, Huntington

- Location within North Yorkshire
- Population: 12,108 (ward. 2011 census)
- OS grid reference: SE556540
- Civil parish: Huntington
- Unitary authority: City of York
- Ceremonial county: North Yorkshire
- Region: Yorkshire and the Humber
- Country: England
- Sovereign state: United Kingdom
- Post town: YORK
- Postcode district: YO31, YO32
- Dialling code: 01904
- Police: North Yorkshire
- Fire: North Yorkshire
- Ambulance: Yorkshire
- UK Parliament: York Outer

Huntington is a village and civil parish in the unitary authority of City of York in North Yorkshire, England. It is part of the Huntington & New Earswick ward and lies on the River Foss, to the north of York and the south of Strensall.

The village was historically part of the North Riding of Yorkshire until 1974. It was then a part of the district of Ryedale in North Yorkshire from 1974 until 1996. Since 1996 it has been part of the City of York unitary authority.

According to the 2001 census Huntington had a population of 9,277, increasing to 12,108 at the 2011 census.

Huntington is made up of mainly low-lying land, with the highest point in the village being only 64 feet above sea level. It covers some 4,800 acres (19 km^{2}) and measures some 4 miles (6 km) from north to south and 3 miles (5 km) east to west.

== History ==
The name Huntington derives from the Old English huntingdūn meaning 'hunting hill'.

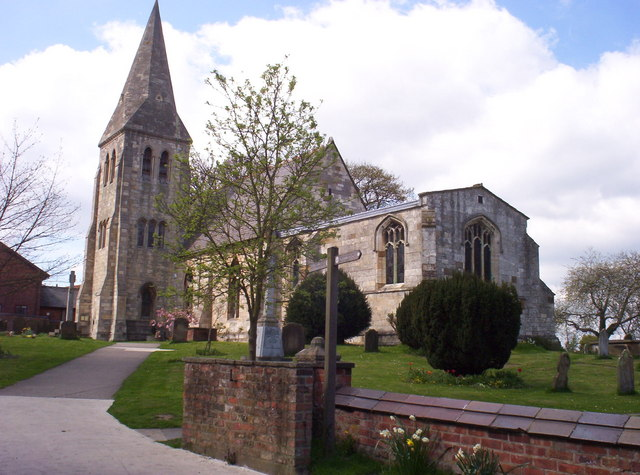
All Saints Church

There has been a parish church (All Saints) in this village since 1086. Huntington originally included three villages within the parish boundaries: Towthorpe, Earswick and Huntington. Huntington itself also comprised the small township of West Huntington, including West Huntington Hall. The village is unique in that the main settlement and church are separated by a river, the Foss. During the Middle Ages, the part of Huntington to the east of the Foss was part of the Forest of Galtres, a hunting royal forest that covered large areas of land to the north-east of York and is still referred to in many local place names. The Act of Dis-Afforestation of 1629 put an end to this.

Huntington remained a very small settlement until the second half of the 19th century, with no more than approximately 630 inhabitants by 1901. The expansion of Huntington started slowly around 1870–1880, with the construction of nearby New Earswick and the opening of Queen Elizabeth Barracks in nearby Strensall. The rehousing schemes during the 1930s speeded up the growth of the village and turned Huntington into a suburban area of the York. The village suffered only a little damage during the Second World War and saw a further housing expansion along Huntington and Strensall Road in the post-war years. The northwards expansion was halted by the construction of the York ring road. Most of the land associated with West Huntington has now become the separate parish of New Earswick. Huntington's old village, including All Saints' Church and the nearby West Huntington Hall, was made a conservation area in 1991. The urbanisation of the village is now almost complete, and current housing development is mainly driven by evolutions in the UK property market, the shortage of housing in York and the attraction of the local secondary school, Huntington School.

Huntington was served by Earswick railway station on the York to Beverley Line between 1847 and 1965.

== Economy ==
=== Local amenities ===
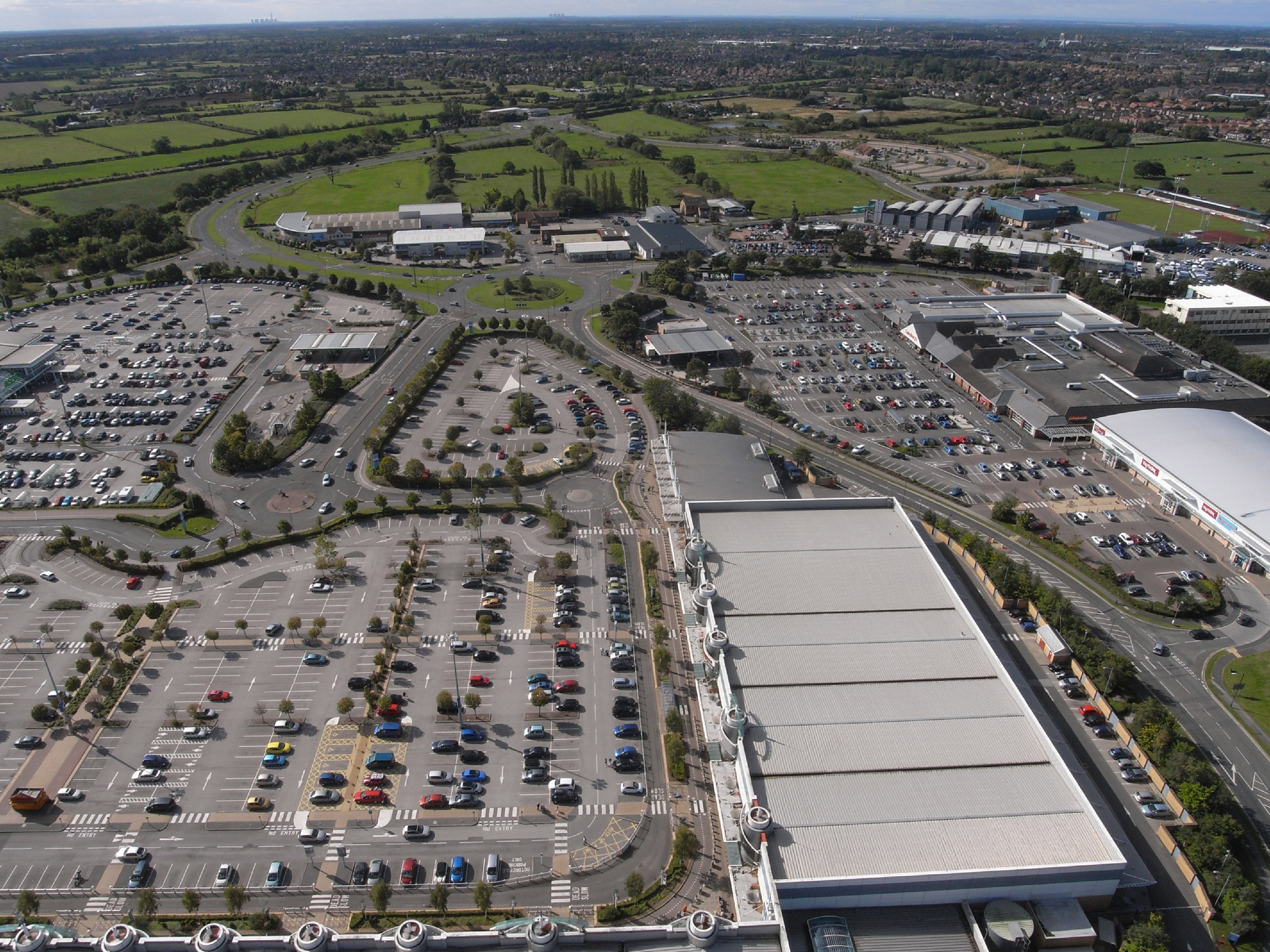
Monks Cross Shopping, Huntington

The village has a post office, newsagent, grocer, butcher, pharmacy and two pubs – the Hogshead and The Blacksmiths Arms. In addition, there are a few light industrial enterprises, including several motor garages. A few community/parish halls provide venues for a good range of local community groups. Monks Cross Shopping includes several national chain stores and three supermarkets.

=== Commerce and industry ===
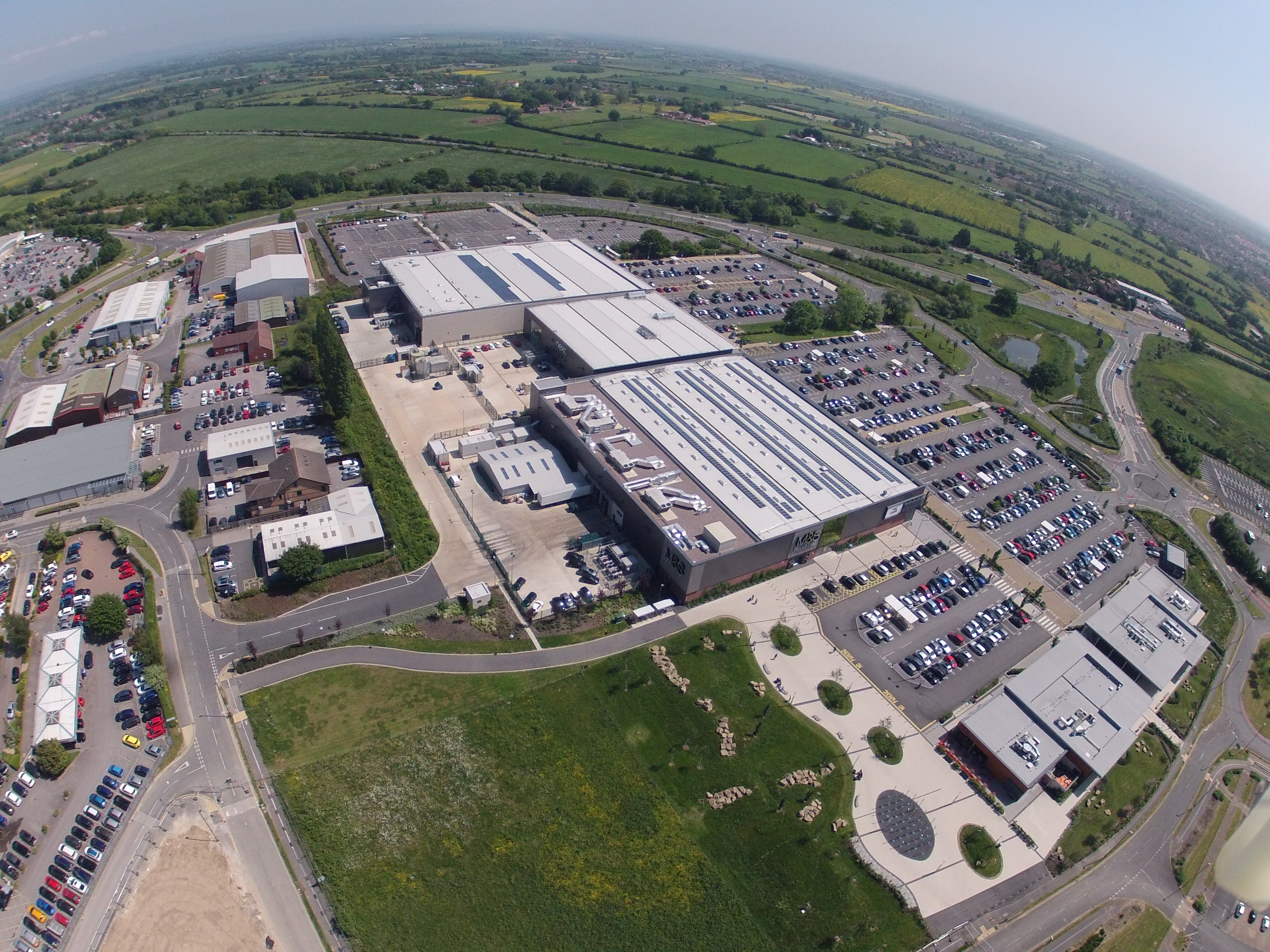

A recent expansion is the retail park Vangarde Shopping Park which include three new major shops and many cafes and restaurants The adjacent industrial estate provides employment through several financial and service sector companies and is the UK headquarters and main manufacturing site of Portakabin Ltd., part of the Shepherd Building Group.

=== Public transport ===
With the demise of the former railway station under the Beeching Axe in the 1960s, Huntington has since been served by local buses. The main bus operator is First York. As of September 2015, Huntington is served (in at least some capacity) by the following local bus routes:

- 5/5A (Orange Line) Strensall – City – Acomb
- 9 (Silver Line) Monks Cross Park & Ride – City
- 12 (Pink Line) Foxwood – City – Monks Cross
- 13 (Brown Line) Copmanthorpe - City - Haxby (Mon – Sat only)
- 14 Foxwood – City – Haxby
- 16A Acomb – Hamilton Drive – City – Elmfield Ave (Sun only)
- 20 Acomb – Clifton Moor – Monks Cross – University
- 99 Monks Cross P&R – Monks Cross Shops
- 180/181 York – Sheriff Hutton – Castle Howard

== Churches ==
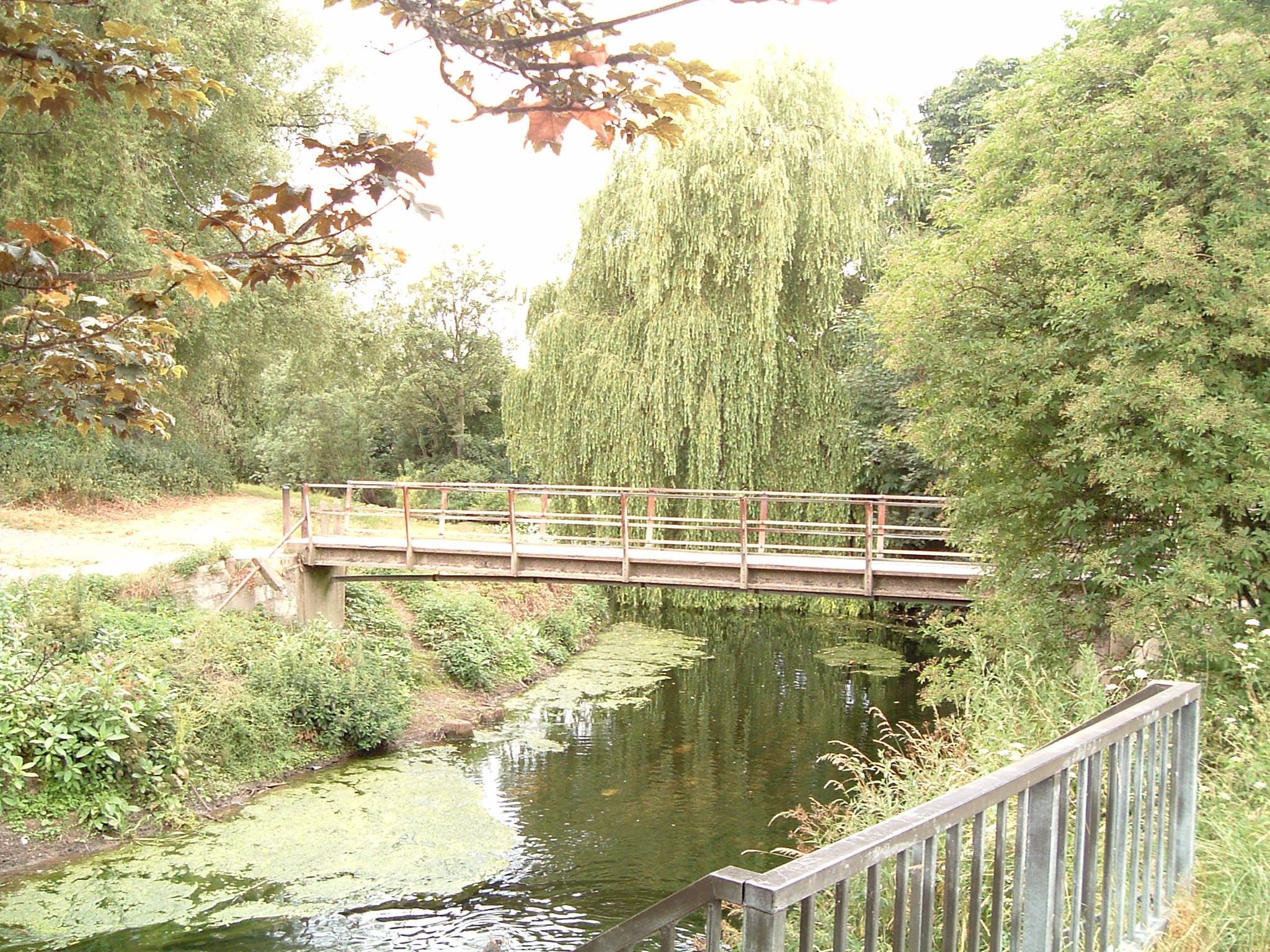
The River Foss at Huntington

All Saints' Church is in the countryside between Huntington and New Earswick, on Church Lane, off the Old Village in Huntington. It is beside the River Foss, which runs between the two villages. It is a popular location for life ceremonies, especially weddings and baptisms and has an attractive and well-maintained churchyard. There is a large car park nearby, which is used all week by Huntington residents for walks along the river, exercising dogs, horses etc.

St Andrew's Church is home to a lively Christian community whose building sits on Huntington Road, near the Link Road, which connects Huntington to New Earswick. It is close to Huntington Secondary School and is just opposite the New Earswick bowls club and the Hogshead (formerly, the Flag & Whistle) pub. The building includes a hall used for numerous youth and community groups during the week as well as the Ladybirds Nursery School and a school of dance. There is also large scout hut to the rear and together with an active church community the site is in use seven days a week including most evenings. The church has recently been refurbished in order to serve the community better, including creating a new kitchen, office space and improved access to the hall and church buildings.

Both All Saints' and St Andrew's are founder members of Churches Together in Huntington and New Earswick, together with Huntington Methodist Church, New Earswick Methodist Church, St Paulinus' Catholic Church and the New Earswick Religious Society of Friends ('Quakers').

== Education ==
Huntington Primary Academy is a large local primary school with approximately 400 pupils. Whilst most children of the village attend the school, Huntington Primary also attracts a relatively large proportion of children from neighbouring villages. Yearsley Grove Primary is another primary school in the area, with around 400 pupils as well.

Huntington School is a mixed comprehensive secondary school. The school is a technology college with approximately 1,500 pupils. The current headteacher of the school is Matt Smith, replacing John Tomsett.

== Sport ==
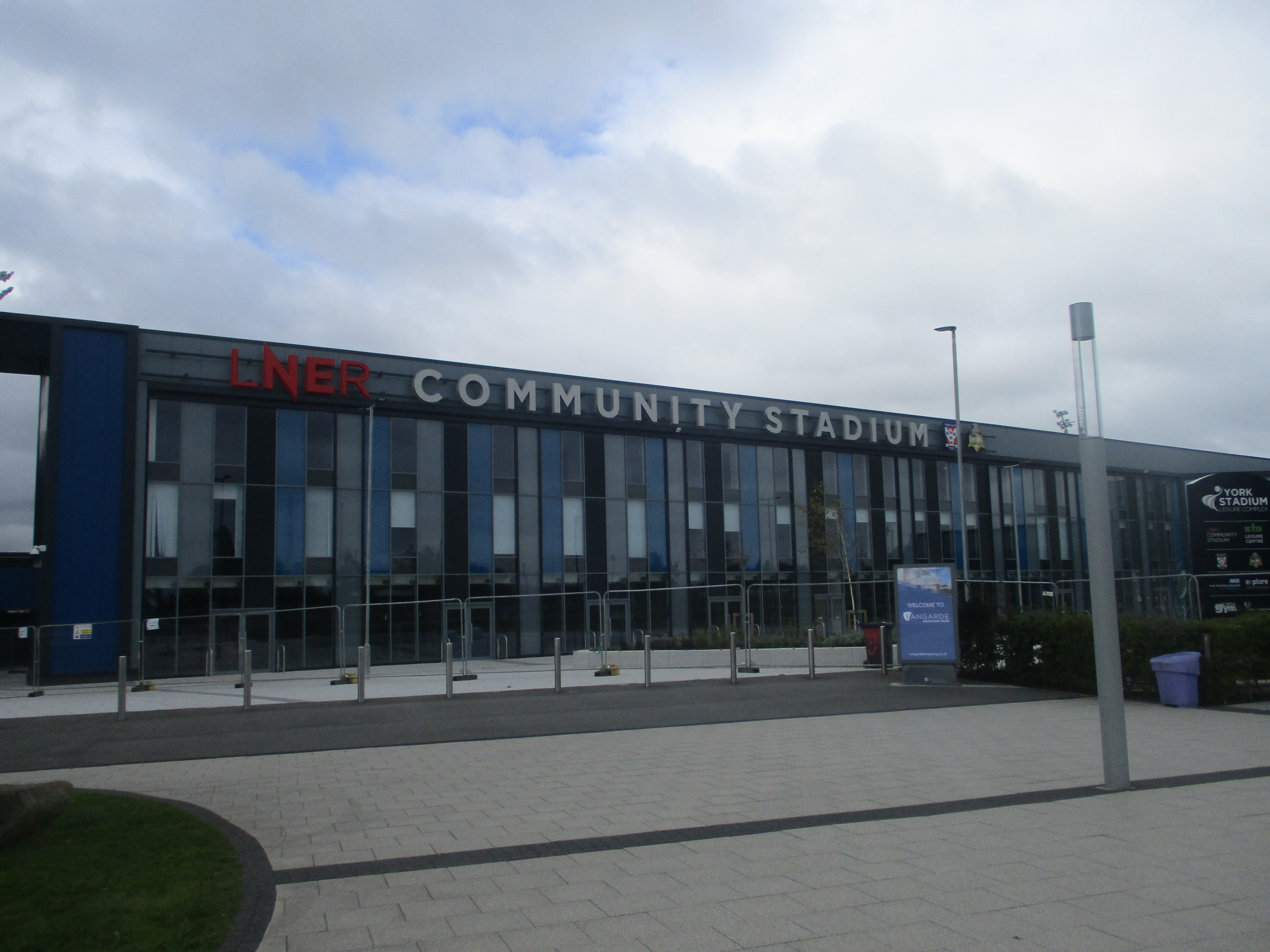
York Community Stadium in 2020

Huntington was the location of Huntington Stadium, a multi-purpose facility which acted primarily as the home of York City Knights. Next to the stadium lied York WaterWorld. Both were mothballed in 2014 in preparation for works on the York Community Stadium. The project would see WaterWorld demolished and Huntington Stadium rebuilt to higher specifications. The new community stadium is home to both York City Knights and York City F.C., the latter relocating from Bootham Crescent, which is to be demolished to make way for a housing development.

A new regional standard athletics track was constructed at the University of York as part of the project to replace the track at Huntington. City of York Athletics Club relocated from Huntington to the university as a result. The old stadium's main playing area was completely surrounded by an athletics track and there was also a small area which was used for hammer throwing, shot put and discus. The stadium was equipped with floodlights. There was an all-seater main stand plus a full-length standing-only covered stand on the opposite side.

A community archaeology project was undertaken by York Archaeological Trust in 2015 to record the site of a Roman Marching Camp Site. The work of the local community project "Dig York Stadium" produced a historical record.

After the York Dig had concluded on 19 June 2015 demolition of Huntington Stadium began. The project faced delays in 2016 following a legal challenge to a planning application and further delays due to being unable to put on required test events in 2020, both before and during the COVID-19 pandemic. Nonetheless the LNER Community Stadium complex opened in 2021, and was a host stadium for the 2021 Women's Rugby League World Cup.
