= Huntington School, York =

Secondary School in Huntington, York, England

Huntington School

Location
- Huntington Road; Huntington; York, North Yorkshire, YO32 9WT; England; 53.99019°N 1.06584°W

Information
- Type: Community school, Comprehensive school
- Established: 1966
- Local authority: City of York
- Department for Education URN: 121673 Tables
- Ofsted: Reports
- Chair of Governors: Jo Olsen
- Headteacher: Matt Smith
- Gender: Mixed
- Age: 11 to 19
- Enrolment: 1,514
- Colours: Red, White and blue
- Website: huntingtonschool.co.uk

Huntington School is a coeducational, comprehensive secondary school in Huntington, York, England, with approximately 1,500 pupils.

== History ==
The school opened in 1966 and became a comprehensive school in September 1973. The school's application to become a Specialist Technology college was granted in 1997.

The current headteacher is Matt Smith and the current director of Sixth Form is Hugh Richards.

== Study ==
=== The arts ===
The school holds the public 'Arts Festival' yearly in which music, art, drama, and dance exhibits are prepared and performed. The Arts Festival are usually organized by an overarching theme, such as "Fearless" in 2025 and "What if" in 2026. The drama department hold separate plays and musicals during the course of the year, such as Blood Brothers. As well as this, a pantomime is put on every year for both students and the public by Sixth Formers and choral and musical concerts are held throughout the academic year too. Music groups at the school include Choir 21, Man Choir, and Secret Choir, composed of girls, boys, and Sixth Formers respectively. There are also instrumental groups such as Big Band, Little Band, Broad Band, and Saxophone, Clarinet, Flute, and String ensembles.

=== Sport ===
Huntington School holds numerous sports clubs including but not limited to Badminton, Football, Hockey, Netball, Rugby, Running, Table Tennis, and Tchoukball. As part of the Personal Development Programme (PDP) for Sixth Formers, students can complete a Sports Leadership Award and engage in sporting activities.

== International links ==
The school has links with Missionsgymnasium St. Antonius in Bad Bentheim, Lower Saxony and conducts an annual work experience exchange for Sixth Formers. In the past, Huntington has also held exchanges with schools in Dijon, France.

The school also has links with Wilhelm-Hittorf-Gymnasium in Münster, Germany.

== Transport ==
Due to its size, of approximately 1,500 students, the school operates a contracted bus system with York Pullman, which provides free transport (with a purchased pass, so technically not free) for some of the outlying villages in Huntington's catchment area, such as Strensall and Pocklington.

== Notable former pupils ==
- Journalist and Guardian columnist Oliver Burkeman
- Commentator Guy Mowbray
- Shed Seven members Rick Witter, Paul Banks and Tom Gladwin
- Actor Daniel Weyman
- Footballer Simon Heslop
- Author K. Sello Duiker
- Labour Politician Luke Charters
- Footballer Tom Allan (footballer)
