= Strensall Halt railway station =

Disused railway station in North Yorkshire, England

Strensall Halt
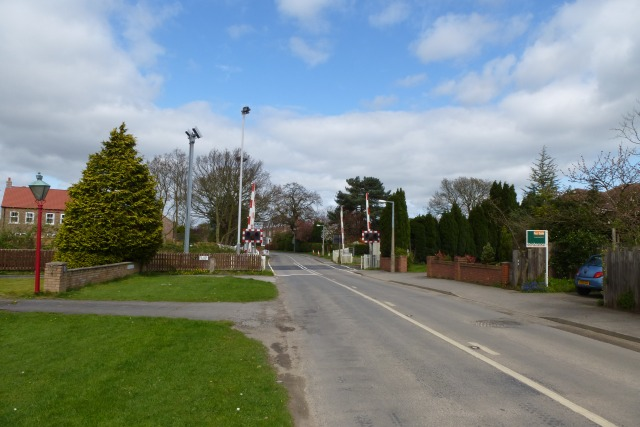
- Level crossing in Strensall, looking north. The station was on the left side.

General information
- Location: Strensall, City of York; England
- Coordinates: 54.03642°N 1.0360°W
- Grid reference: SE631604
- Platforms: 2

Other information
- Status: Disused

History
- Post-grouping: London and North Eastern Railway

Key dates
- 17 September 1926: opened
- 22 September 1930: closed
Location

Strensall Halt railway station was a minor railway station serving the village of Strensall in North Yorkshire, England. It was situated on the York to Scarborough Line and was opened on 17 September 1926 by the London and North Eastern Railway. It closed on 22 September 1930.

The halt was located west of the level crossing of the LNER line with Moor Lane, south of the village.

Preceding station	Historical railways	Following station
Haxby; Station closed; Line open	Y&NMR; York to Scarborough Line	Strensall; Station closed; Line open
