= Haxby =

Town and civil parish in North Yorkshire, England

Coordinates: 54°00′57″N 1°04′19″W

- Town
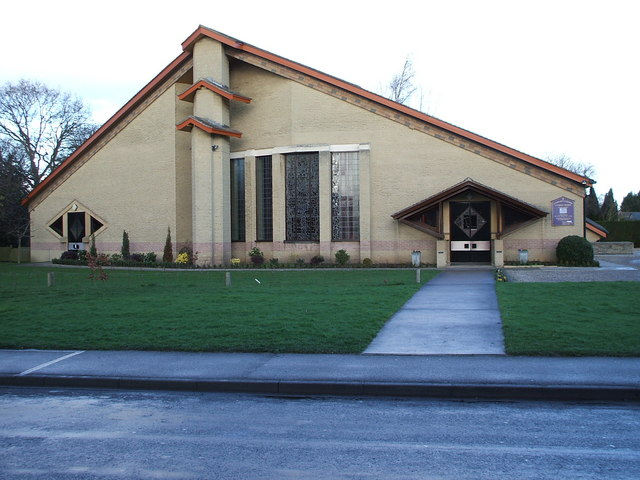
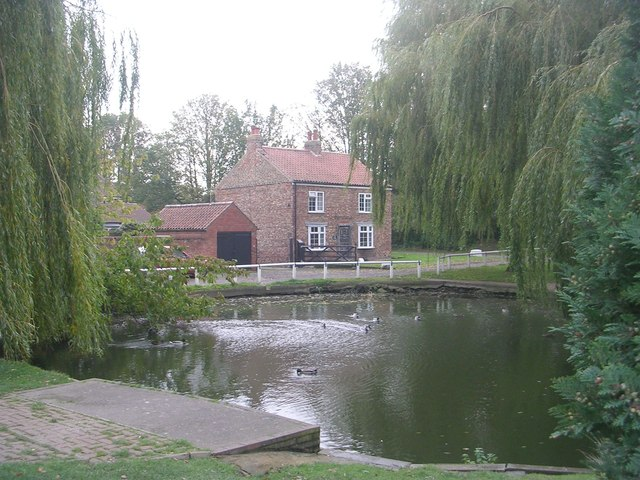
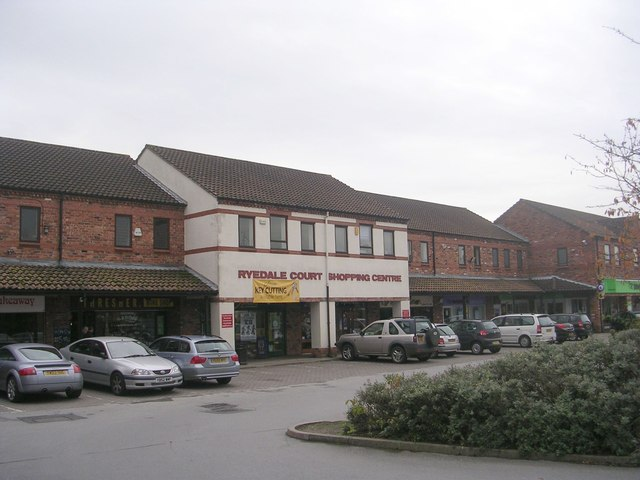
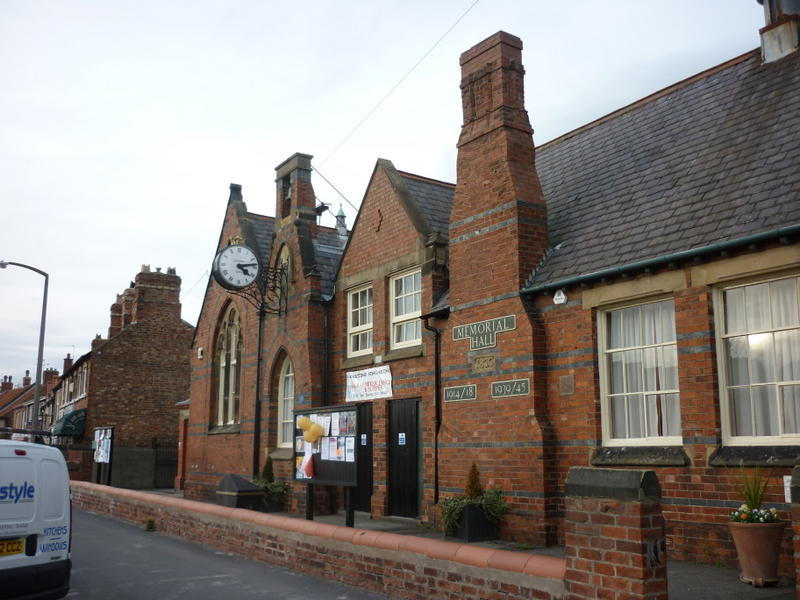
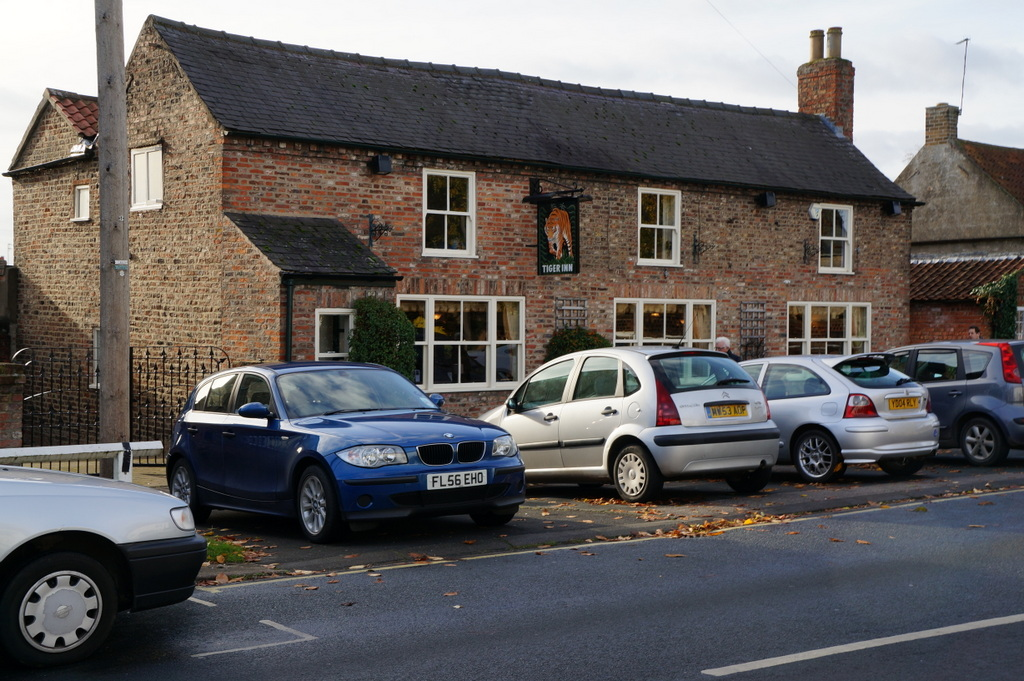
- Catholic Church Wyre Pond Ryedale Court Shopping Centre Memorial Hall The Tiger Inn

- Location within North Yorkshire
- Population: 8,428 (2011 census)
- OS grid reference: SE607582
- Civil parish: Haxby
- Unitary authority: City of York
- Ceremonial county: North Yorkshire
- Region: Yorkshire and the Humber
- Country: England
- Sovereign state: United Kingdom
- Post town: YORK
- Postcode district: YO32
- Dialling code: 01904
- Police: North Yorkshire
- Fire: North Yorkshire
- Ambulance: Yorkshire
- UK Parliament: York Outer

Haxby is a town and civil parish in the City of York, a unitary authority area in the English county of North Yorkshire. According to the 2001 Census, the parish had a population of 8,754, which reduced to 8,428 at the 2011 Census.

Open farmland extends to the north as far as the villages of Sutton-on-the-Forest and Strensall. The River Foss and Earswick is to the east. It is outside of the York Outer Ring Road (A1237) and near the New Earswick and Huntington areas of York, to the south. It shares a continuous built-up area with the village and parish of Wigginton to the west.

Its name is of Old Norse origin with the personal name of Hákr's settlement, in Old Norse bý. It was recorded as Haxebi in the Domesday Book of 1086. Haxby Town Centre, known as "The Village", has been a Conservation Area since 1976. The town's charter was granted in 1992.

The Yorkshire village of Haxby was administered by the North Riding County Council and Flaxton Rural District Council until 1974. From 1974 to 1996, Haxby became part of the county of North Yorkshire and Ryedale District. Since 1996 the town of Haxby has been part of the City of York, a unitary authority.

== History ==
A settlement on the site of the modern town named by the Vikings as Haxebi was established around the 9th century. The Norse word "BY" meant a township or farm and was usually appended to the name of the holder of the lands, in this case a man called Hakr. A Grade III listed Viking cross base in the churchyard of St Mary's Church, and the discovery of a Viking cross shaft in a nearby garden in 1978 support this date. There is evidence of Roman occupation with the 1966 discovery of a site of a Roman villa on Haxby Moor. Roman pottery was found in 2003 on Station Road along with a silver Roman signet ring.

In the Middle Ages, because the village was in the royal Forest of Galtres, its inhabitants were subject to forest law and took part in the occasional courts that devised and enforced it. Charles I divested himself of the forest in 1629 and the village acquired the land to increase its size, resulting in the parish of some 2,100 acres (8.5 km^{2}) of today. Haxby was not a separate parish. Initially it was divided between the parishes of Strensall and Driffield. Once St Mary's Church, Haxby was built in the 16th century it became a chapelry to the parish of Strensall and in 1862 became a parish in its own right.

Much of the current town centre is 18th and early 19th century architecture but significant redevelopment took place in Victorian times of which the Memorial Hall (formerly the Board School), now housing a local community radio station Vale Radio, the present St Mary's Church and the Methodist Chapel are all important buildings. It was at this time, with the arrival of the railway in Haxby, that the village became a popular place to live and commute from. Growth continued gradually throughout the first half of the 20th century until the population explosion in the 1970s quadrupled the population. In 1976, the local authority took the very important step of designating the centre of Haxby as a conservation area.

By 1992, Haxby had outgrown its image of a rural village and was declared a town, by which time its population had grown to be over 10,000. In 1996, a national revision of boundaries moved Haxby from Ryedale District Council to be part of City of York Unitary Authority and this new authority adopted the boundaries and conditions of the conservation area.

== Governance ==
Haxby Town Council
- Arms of Haxby Town Council

Type
- Type: Parish council

History
- Founded: 1992

Leadership
- Chairman: Ruth Pearson
- Town Clerk: Alan Draper

Structure
- Seats: 14 Councillors (1 vacancy)
- Liberal Democrats: 7 / 14
- Independent: 3 / 14
- Labour: 2 / 14
- Conservative: 1 / 14

Elections
- Voting system: Plurality-at-large
- Last election: 4 May 2023
- Next election: 6 May 2027

Meeting place
- Haxby Memorial Hall or the Oaken Grove Community Centre

Website
- www.haxbytowncouncil.gov.uk

=== Haxby Town Council ===
Haxby has a Town Council, which is represented by (up to) 14 Councillors from four Wards (North, East, Central, and South West) which align with the four polling districts. The Town Council office is located at Haxby Memorial Hall, and Town Council meetings are traditionally held there; though since 2021 a number of meetings now take place at the Oaken Grove Community Centre.

The Town Council is responsible for maintenance of the Village Green along both sides of The Village, including Wyre Pond (Haxby Duck Pond), maintaining Ethel Ward Memorial Playing Fields and Mancroft Recreational Open Space (including the Ethel Ward Pavilion and children's play areas/equipment), and community assets such as bus shelters, benches, and noticeboards.

The Town Council also administers the Allotment gardens on Station Road, and is jointly responsible for Haxby and Wigginton Cemetery (along with Wigginton Parish Council). Haxby Town Council also organises the annual Haxby Carnival.

=== Haxby and Wigginton Ward Committee (City of York Council) ===
The town lies within the Haxby and Wigginton Ward of the City of York Council (a Unitary Authority). Haxby and Wigginton Ward is represented by three City of York Council Members, and these three Members constitute the local Ward Committee; which has a small budget for local highways improvements and grants for local organisations. Elections to the City Council are held every four years. As of the last election in May 2023 Haxby and Wigginton Ward was represented by Councillors Ian Cuthbertson, Andrew Hollyer and Edward Pearson, though Edward Pearson stood down in 2024 and was replaced after a by-election by Richard Watson, all of whom are members of the Liberal Democrat Party.

City of York Council is responsible for a number of statutory local services, including adult social care, children and education, waste services (such as household waste and recycling bin collections), transport and highways (such as local roads and adopted footpaths), library services etc.

=== York Outer Member of Parliament ===
Haxby was in the Vale of York parliamentary constituency until the 2010 general election when it was transferred to the newly created constituency of York Outer. In that election the Conservative Party candidate, Julian Sturdy, was elected with 43% of the vote and a majority of 3,688 over the Liberal Democrat candidate. Sturdy has retained the seat in subsequent elections in 2015, 2017, and 2019, but was ousted in the 2024 election, the seat being taken by Luke Charters.

=== Elections ===
Elections for the three City Council seats and fourteen Town Council seats are held every four years with the last elections having been held in May 2023 and the next elections due in May 2027. There are four polling districts in Haxby and polling stations are located at the Memorial Hall, the Scout Hut, and St Margaret Clitherow's Church.

Contested elections were held in May 2023 for both Central and South West Wards of Haxby Town Council. Town Councillors in the North and East Wards of Haxby Town Council were elected unopposed due to there being fewer candidates than seats. Historically, Haxby Town Councillors have been elected unopposed or co-opted due to there being an equal or lower number of candidates to seats. However, a casual vacancy to Haxby North Ward arose on the Town Council in late 2021 due to a resignation; and a contested by-election was held in November 2021.

== Demography ==
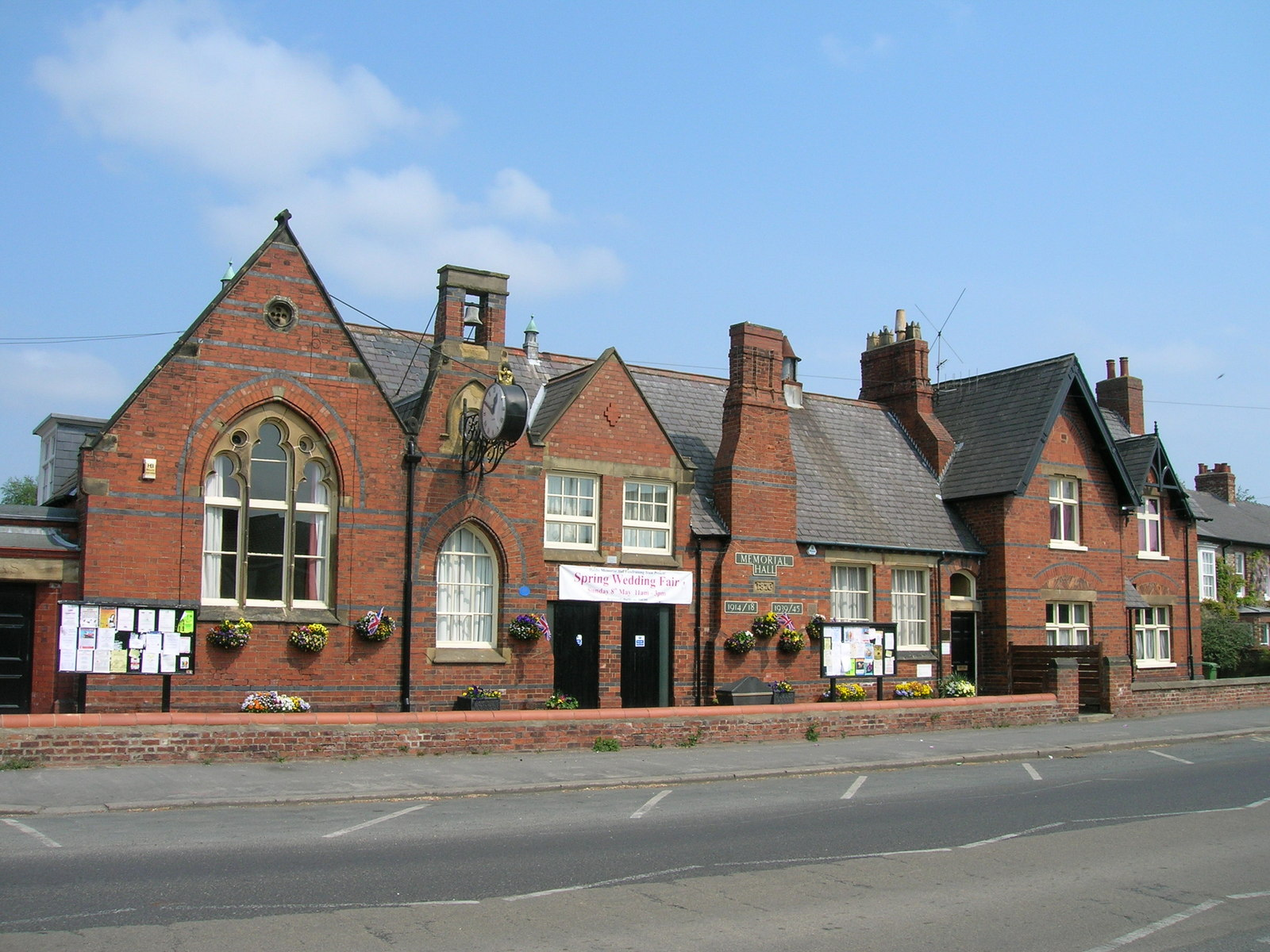
Haxby Memorial Hall

The 1881 Census records the population as 559. According to the 2001 Census, the parish had a population of 8,754, which reduced to 8,428 at the 2011 Census.

City of York Council produce regular Ward Profile documents providing statistical population and demographic data for the local area. According to the 2021–22 Q2 Haxby and Wigginton Ward Profile:

- Haxby and Wigginton had 11,769 residents with 1.8% from a black and minority ethnic community group.
- 82.3% of Haxby and Wigginton residents are in good health, with 17.8% stating that they have some limitation in day-to-day activities.
- £664.62 was the Average Net Weekly Household Income in 2017–18 in Haxby and Wigginton.
- 88% of residents in Haxby and Wigginton own their own home, either outright or with a mortgage, 6% are private renters and 5% are social tenants. There are no Council Houses in Haxby and Wigginton ward.
- 71.3% of Haxby and Wigginton residents have a Level 1 – 4 qualification, but 19.5% have no qualifications at all.
- 8.3% of children in Haxby and Wigginton are living in low income families (2.3% of children live in a household where a parent or guardian claims an out-of-work benefit) and there are 8.9% of Haxby and Wigginton households in fuel poverty.
- 1.2% of the working population (aged 16–64) in Haxby and Wigginton claim out of work benefits (either Job Seekers Allowance or Universal Credit)

== Geography ==
The town sits on flat ground consisting mostly of clay with soil that is sand and alluvium, near the old Forest of Galtres. To the north is a small tributary of the River Foss called Goland Dike, and to the east is the River Foss which flows southward. The nearby village of Wigginton now merges with Haxby though the old Parish Boundary map still shows the dividing line. This runs east to west along the back of the houses on Wheatfield Lane on its southern edge as far as Barley View. Here it turns northward cutting across Greenshaw Drive until it reaches the road known The Village. The boundary follows this road until it turns west. The boundary at this point continues northward cutting across Windsor Drive near Ripley Grove and then out into the countryside.

== Transport ==
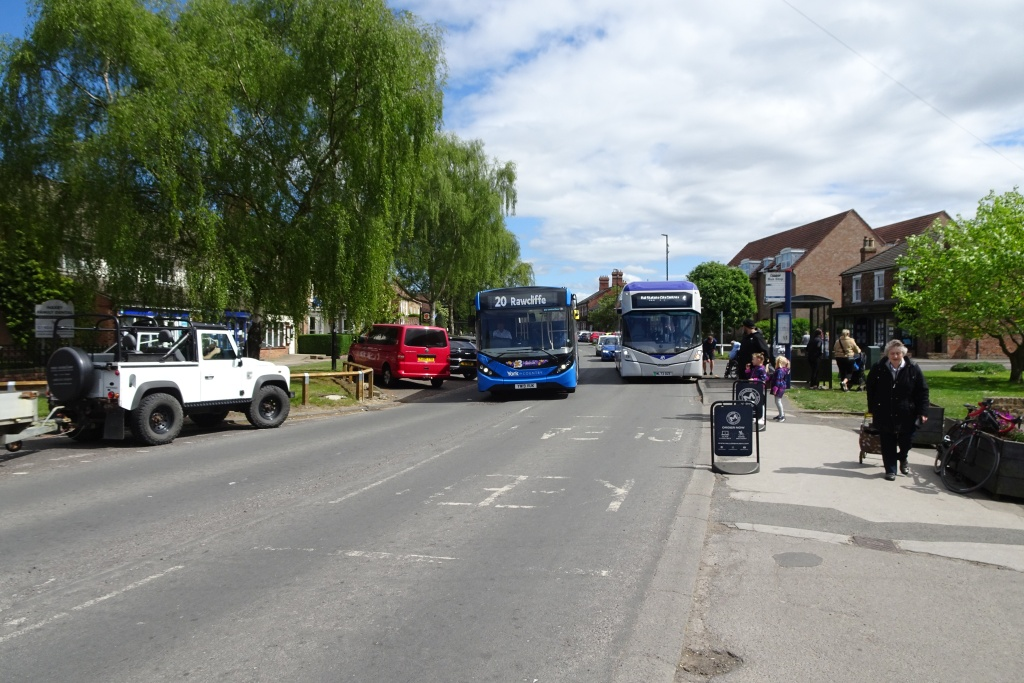
Buses services in the town centre

First York, Connexions, and Transdev (York and Country) operate bus services to and from Haxby.

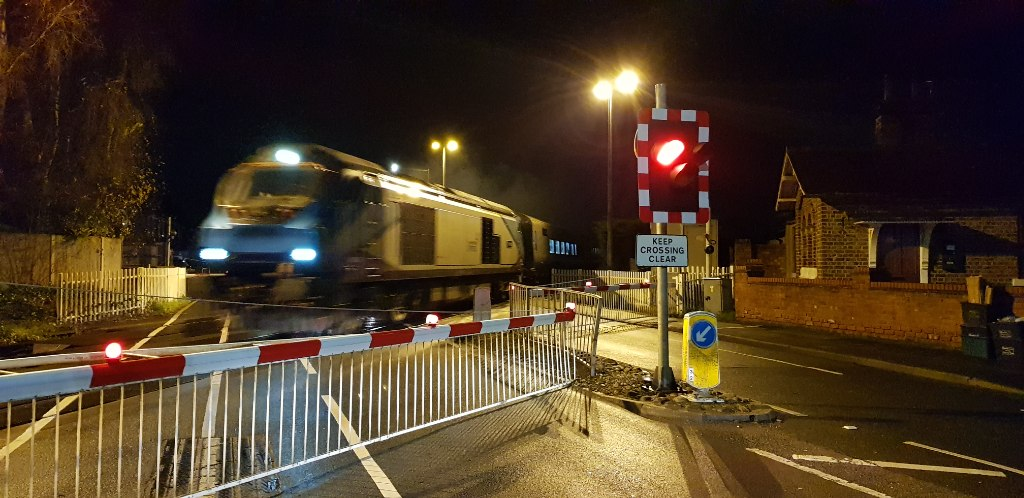
Railway Crossing

Between 1845 and 1930, Haxby was served by Haxby railway station on the York to Scarborough line. Various attempts have been made to reopen a new station over the years, including concerted efforts in the 1980s, late 1990s, early 2000s and in 2011.

In 2020, the City of York Council spent circa £50 thousand to put together a business case and bid for the Government's New Stations Fund (Round 3), which received cross-party support and the full backing of the rail industry and transport campaigners. An online consultation and survey was conducted during the Covid pandemic first lockdown to include local residents views within the bid. The bid was successful and City of York Council was awarded a further £400 thousand by the Department for Transport to work with Network Rail to progress the new station proposals to detailed design stage and undertake the necessary operational feasibility studies. It was hoped that the station could open as soon as 2024, but this did not happen.

Since the 2020 funding award, in late September 2021, City of York Council agreed to purchase some land at a cost of circa £300 thousand adjacent to the railway in Haxby which could be used as a site for the new station, with two potential station sites identified and aspirations for a half-hourly train service. In 2023 a further £1.1 million was awarded by the DfT to progress detailed designs for the station with Network Rail, including the station car park and access arrangements, as well as tests and surveys at Towthorpe Road site to ensure adequate foundations and drainage provision. In September 2023, Network Rail Carried out a number of on-site surveys to assess the ground conditions.

In October 2023, following the cancellation of HS2 phase 2, Haxby station was re-announced by the Department for Transport the as part of the ‘Network North’ transport improvement projects. Planning permission for the station was submitted in early 2024, with construction proposed in 2025, and opening in 2026. Funding for the 'Network North' scheme was withdrawn in July 2024.

== Education ==
Primary school education is provided at Headlands Primary School in Oak Tree Lane and Ralph Butterfield School in Station Road.

The town is within the catchment area of Joseph Rowntree Secondary School.

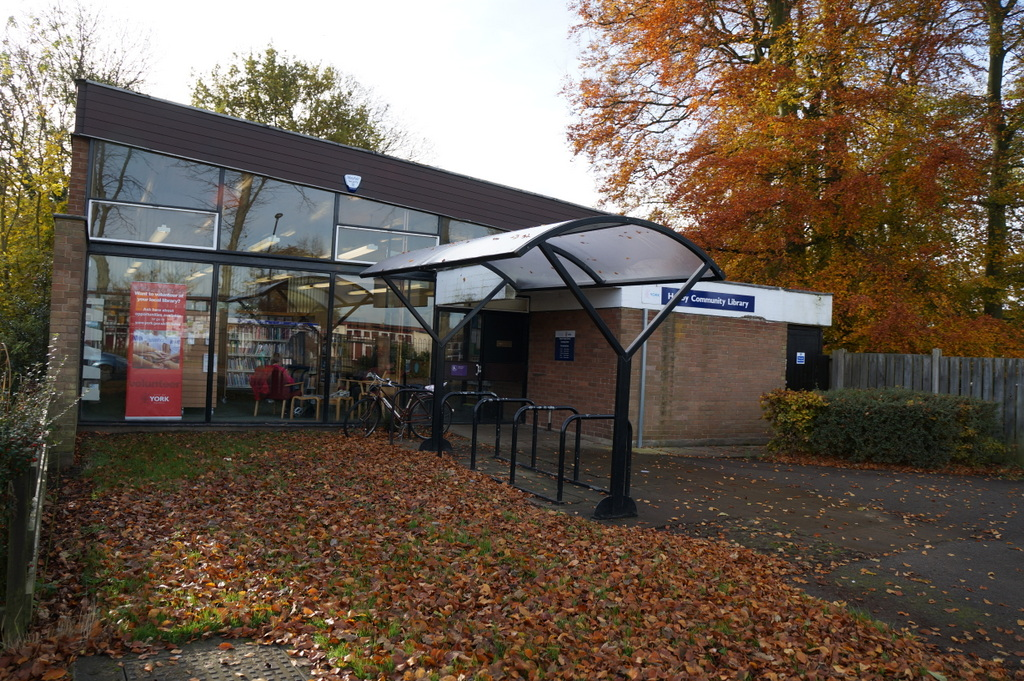
Haxby Community Library

Oaken Grove Primary School (formerly Usher Lane Annex) was closed in the 2002 and part of the site became Reid Park. The rest of the site including the football pitch was retained by the Haxby and Wigginton Youth and Community Association and reopened as the Oaken Grove Community Centre.

In January 2023, the new Haxby and Wigginton Library re-opened at the Oaken Grove Community Centre, following a £1.2 million refurbishment. A number of classes, activities, and Youth services are provided at the two large community rooms, and the reopened facility includes a community cafe, a children's library area, and a main library and reading room.

== Media ==
Local news and television programmes are provided by BBC Yorkshire and BBC North East and Cumbria on BBC One and ITV Yorkshire and ITV Tyne Tees on ITV1. Television signals are received from either the Emley Moor or Bilsdale transmitters.

Local radio stations are BBC Radio York on 103.7 FM, Greatest Hits Radio Yorkshire (formerly Minster FM) on 104.7 FM, YO1 Radio on 102.8 FM, Jorvik Radio on 94.8 FM and YorkMix Radio which broadcast from York on DAB.

The town's local newspaper is The York Press.

== Sports ==
Haxby United Football Club play at the Ethel Ward Playing Fields. As of 2013, the 1st XI play in the York League Division 2, having won the Premier League title in the 2009–10 season. The 2nd XI play in the Reserve Division A.

As of 2010 Haxby Netball Club play in the York and District Netball League, fielding two sides in Division One, two in Division Two, one in Division Three and one in Division Four.

== Religion ==
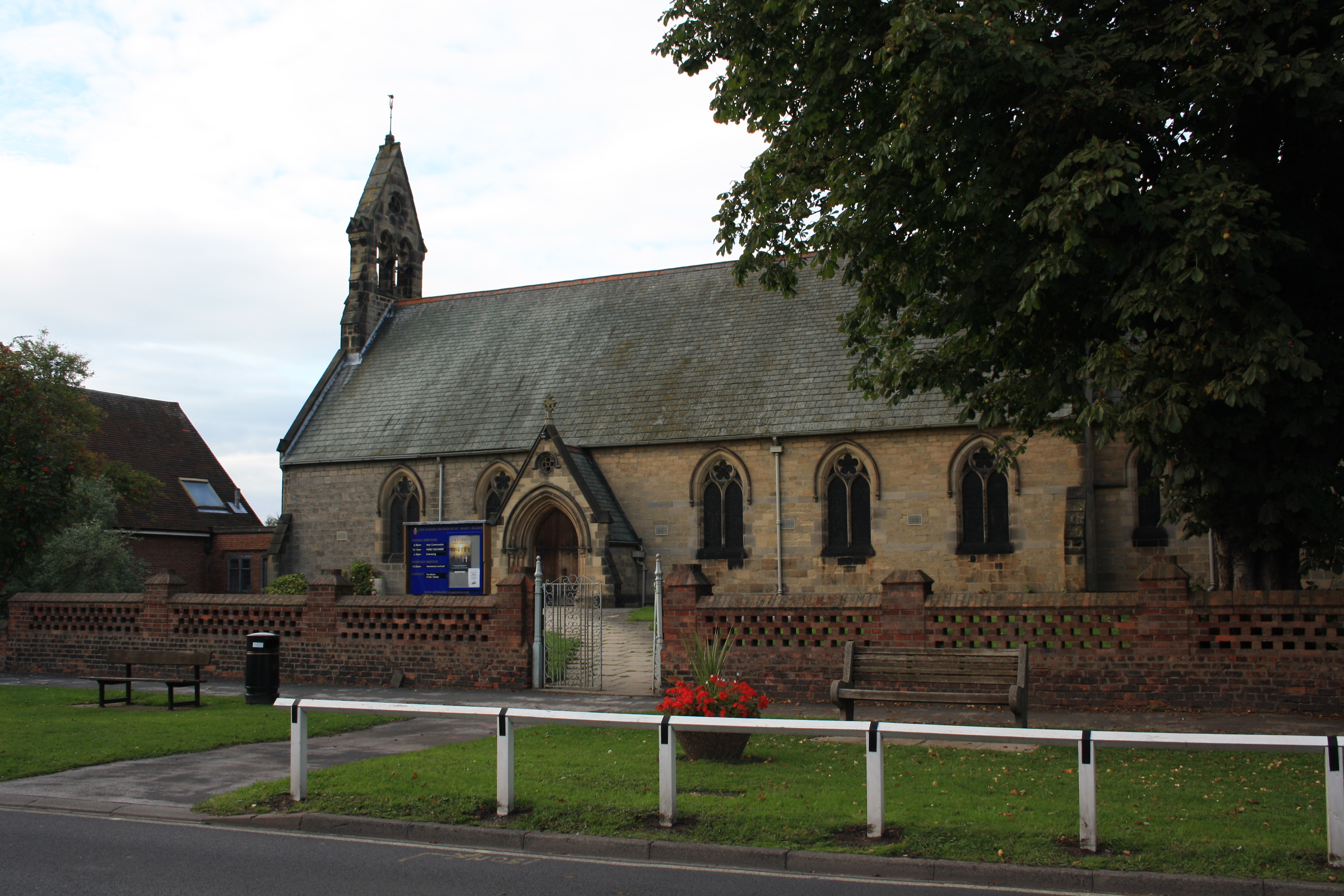
St. Mary's Church

St Mary's Church, Haxby was rebuilt in 1878 on the site of the former 16th century building with Parish Registers dating back to 1678 and is located on the road known as the Village near the centre of the town. In the 19th century there was both a Wesleyan Methodist Chapel and a Primitive Methodist Chapel. As of 2010 only the Wesleyan Chapel remains as home to Haxby & Wigginton Methodist Church on the road known as the Village opposite Sandy Lane.

St Margaret Clitherow's Church, Haxby is a Roman Catholic church located in Holly Tree Lane.

== Notable residents ==
- Actress Taj Atwal (Hullraisers, Line of Duty) lived in Haxby.

== See also ==
- Listed buildings in Haxby
- Haxby Hall

== Sources ==
- Tom Smith, A History of Haxby (Revised and Expanded), ISBN 1-85072-298-6 .
