= Haxby railway station =

Disused railway station in York, England

Haxby
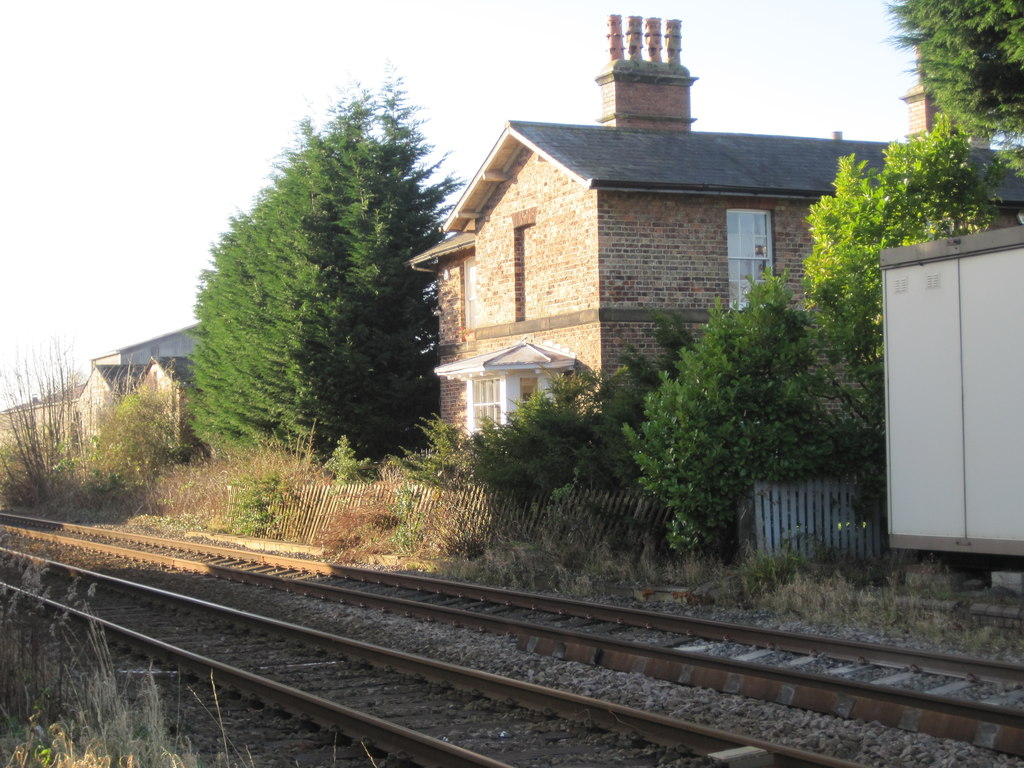
- The former station in 2012

General information
- Location: Haxby, City of York; England
- Coordinates: 54.022125°N 1.060491°W
- Grid reference: SE613581
- Platforms: 2

Other information
- Status: Disused

History
- Original company: York and North Midland Railway
- Pre-grouping: North Eastern Railway
- Post-grouping: London and North Eastern Railway

Key dates
- 1845: Opened
- 1930: Closed
- 2028: Proposed re-opening
Location

Haxby railway station was a minor railway station serving the town of Haxby in the City of York, England. Located on the York to Scarborough Line it was opened on 5 July 1845 by the York and North Midland Railway. The Y&NMR became part of the North Eastern Railway in 1854 which in turn became part of the London and North Eastern Railway in 1923. It closed on 22 September 1930.

Bradshaws timetable for summer 1927 showed 15 trains in each direction on a weekday with two services on a Sunday. Trains operated between York and Flaxton railway station and a number of these were operated by a bus mounted on rail wheels.

The initial rail bus was first put into service in 1922 and was based on the road buses operated by the North Eastern Railway (NER) in the Durham area. An additional driving position was fitted to the back and additional doors were fitted in the centre of the bus. The bus could seat 26 passengers and was initially numbered 110. This conflicted with another NER carriage number and was subsequently renumbered to Y130. In July 1923 Y130 was moved to Selby and a new rail motor (number 2130) started work. This was a slightly bigger vehicle seating 30 passengers, being 38-foot (12 m) long and weighing 17.5 tonnes (17.2 long tons; 19.3 short tons). It was renumbered 22105 in August 1926 and worked the service until increasing bus competition killed off the station (although freight services lasted until 1964). 22105 moved to Hull and was withdrawn in 1934. These two vehicles were predecessors of the many Diesel Multiple Units that proliferate on Britain's railways.

The York to Scarborough line generally sees an hourly service operated by TransPennine Express services formed of Class 185 Diesel Multiple Unit trains. A number of steam specials use the line during the year.

== Reopening ==
There has been talk of reopening a station at Haxby since the 1980s as the town has grown and to help reduce road congestion into York including around York station. The reopening plan was approved by the City of York Council in 1997 and was part of the 2001 local transport plan. The plans continued to be shelved for a number of reasons, but Network Rail said in 2006 that it would provisionally support the reopening of this station. Funding for re-opening the station was announced in early 2009, with a target date for opening in January 2013, but the plans were put on hold in June 2010 until the amount of public money necessary for the works can be clarified.

The possibility of re-opening Haxby station was revived by an announcement by City of York Council along with several of other transport related schemes in September 2012. The New Stations Study by West Yorkshire Metro in 2014 recommended further study of the site, and the City of York Council estimated that 22,000 people lived within 3 miles (4.8 km) of the proposed station.

In 2020, it was announced that the government would provide funding for further studies into the reopening of the station, and in early 2021, York City Council bought 6.8 acres (2.8 ha) of land beside the proposed new station's location.

In November 2020 it was announced that Haxby station had been successful in its application for money from the New Stations Fund. Towards the end of 2022, the council intended to submit an application to the Department of Transport for the new station, with a projected opening time of 2024 at a cost of £24 million. However, disagreements about the location of the new station delayed the submission until May 2023, and a decision would not be taken until August 2023. Detailed plans were submitted to York City Council in February 2024. The station is projected to have two platforms, a 154 space car park, a taxi rank and a bus stop. Construction was expected to start in spring 2025, however, due to financial issues, government money was withdrawn from various railway schemes in July 2024. The City of York Council stated that it remain committed to the scheme.

Construction of the new station is now expected to begin in April 2027, with ground surveys being carried out just prior (as of 23/7/26).

== See also ==
- Listed buildings in Haxby

| Preceding station | Historical railways | Following station |
|---|---|---|
| York | Y&NMR; York to Scarborough Line | Strensall Halt; Station closed; Line open |
