= St Margaret Clitherow's Church, Haxby =

Church in Haxby, North Yorkshire, England

St Margaret Clitherow's Church
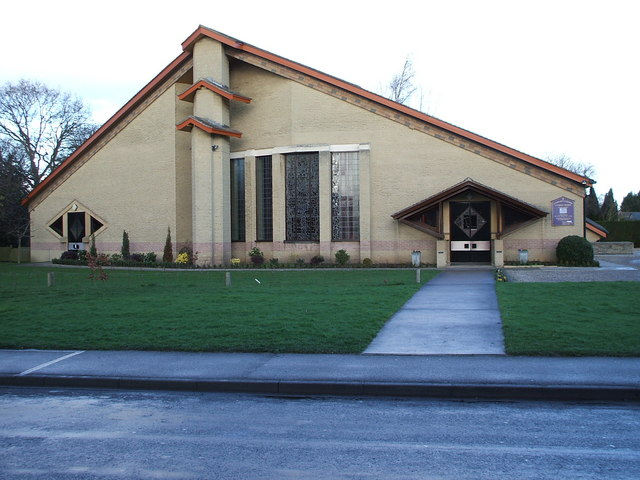
- The church, in 2007
- St Margaret Clitherow's Church
- 54.01095°N 1.07446°W
- OS grid reference: SE 60750 57608
- Location: Haxby, North Yorkshire
- Address: 3 Holly Tree Lane, Haxby
- Country: England
- Denomination: Catholic
- Website: stmargaretclitherowyork.org.uk

History
- Status: Active
- Dedication: Margaret Clitherow
- Consecrated: 13 March 1999

Architecture
- Architect: John Black
- Style: Modern
- Completed: 1985

Specifications
- Materials: Brick and stone

Administration
- Province: Liverpool
- Diocese: Middlesbrough
- Deanery: Central Vicariate

St Margaret Clitherow's Church is a Catholic parish church in Haxby, a town north of York in England.

Catholics in Haxby had long worshipped at St Wilfrid's Church, York. In 1970, Mass was first said in Haxby's Memorial Hall. In 1971, services moved to Wigginton Hall, and then in 1975 to St Mary's Church, Haxby, the local Anglican church. In 1977, the parish of Haxby and Wigginton was established, and Church Farm House was purchased to serve as a daily mass centre. A building with a capacity of 250 worshippers was designed by John Black and completed in 1985. It was constructed by William Birch & Sons at a cost of £300,000. The church was consecrated on 13 March 1999.

The church is broadly modern in style, clad in stone but with brick walls internally. The front is asymmetrical, the peak of the roof supported by a partially detached pier, with its own roof and two gablets. To its right is the main entrance under a porch with a shallow roof, and a window with four lights. The interior is a single space, but the altar and sanctuary are raised two steps. Stained glass in the window depicts Saint Margaret Clitherow, Saint Wilfrid and Saint Hilda, designed by Harry Harvey. At the east end are six windows with stained glass by Graeme Willson.
