= Listed buildings in Haxby =

Haxby is a civil parish in the unitary authority of the City of York, North Yorkshire, England. It contains four listed buildings that are recorded in the National Heritage List for England. All the listed buildings are designated at Grade II, the lowest of the three grades, which is applied to "buildings of national importance and special interest". The parish contains the town of Haxby and the surrounding area. The listed buildings consist of a cross stump in a churchyard, a house, a farmhouse, and a former stationmaster's house.

== Buildings ==
Name and location	Photograph	Date	Notes
Cross stump 54.01686°N 1.07569°W	—	14th or 15th century	The cross stump is on a base, it is in the churchyard of St Mary's Church, immediately to the south of the church, and is in limestone. The base is about 0.5 metres (1 ft 8 in) in height, and 6 metres (20 ft) square, its corners chamfered to form an octagonal upper surface. The stump is about 0.75 metres (2 ft 6 in) in height, 0.3 metres (1 ft 0 in) in width, and 0.2 metres (7.9 in) in depth, and has roll moulding on the corners.
48 The Village; 54.01682°N 1.07619°W	—	Mid-18th century	The house is in brick, and has a pantile roof with gable coping and shaped kneelers. There are three storeys and three bays. The central doorway has pilasters and a fanlight. The windows on the two lower floors are sashes with wedge lintels, and on the upper floor are fixed windows.
Haxby Grange Farmhouse; 54.03030°N 1.07254°W	—	Mid-18th century	The farmhouse is in brick, with a floor band, a cogged eaves course, and a pantile roof with raised gables and tumbled-in brickwork. There are two storeys and three bays. The central doorway has a divided fanlight, above it is a blocked opening, and the windows are sashes.
Station House; 54.01598°N 1.06534°W		c. 1850	Originally the stationmaster's house for Haxby railway station on the York and North Midland Railway, later a private house, it is in brick, with a floor band, and a Welsh slate roof. There are two storeys and three bays, and two rear cross-wings. The central doorway has a radial fanlight with a keystone and a moulded cornice. The windows are sashes under cambered brick arches, those on the ground floor in shallow recesses.
