= All Saints' Church, Rufforth =

Grade II listed church in York, England

Coordinates: 53.956°N 1.197°W

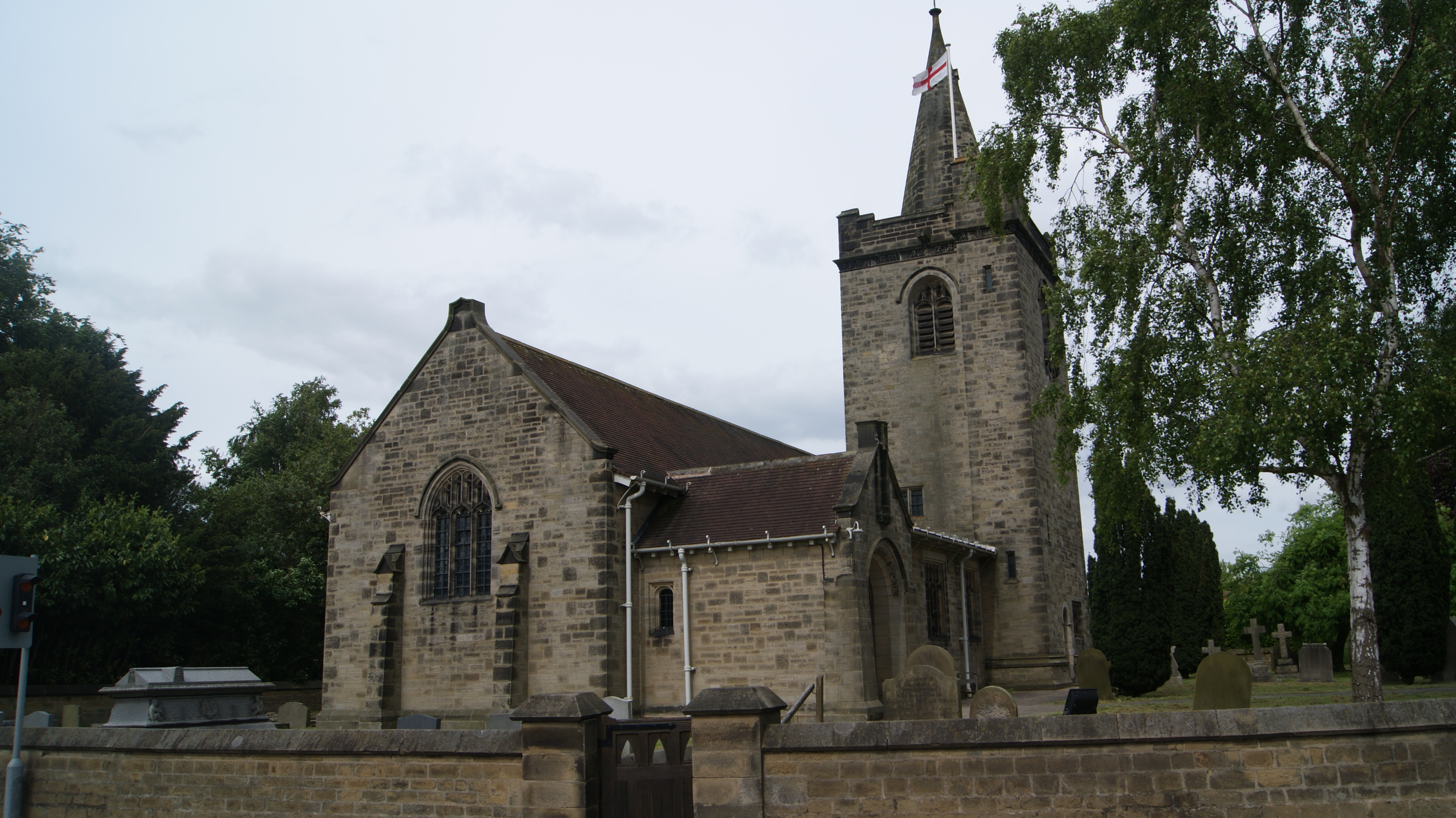
The church, in 2013

All Saints' Church is the parish church of the village of Rufforth, in the rural western part of the City of York, in England.

A church was constructed on the site in the 12th century. It was restored in 1832. In 1866, it was described as "much modernised" and "scarcely worth notice". At the time, its nave and chancel were of almost equal length. Its porch was recently built of brick, and it also had a recently added belfry.

However, by the late 19th century, the church was in poor repair. From 1894 to 1895, it was demolished, and a new church designed by James Demaine and Walter Brierley was constructed, to seat a congregation of 120. The church was grade II listed in 1987. It was refurbished in 1998, and in 2008, its peal of bells was increased from 3 to 6.

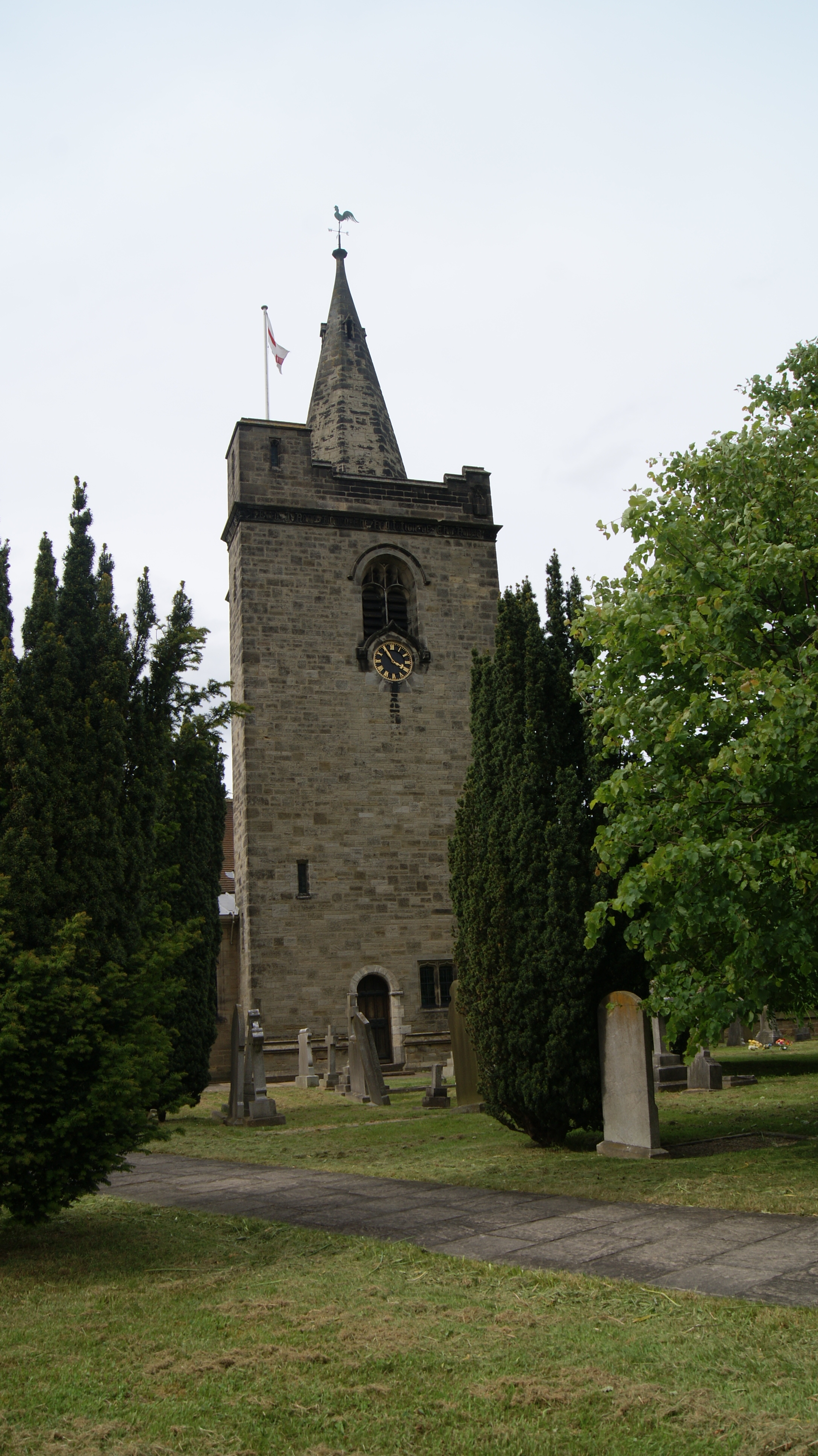
The tower

The church is built of stone, some of which is reused from the Mediaeval church, and is in the neo-Gothic style. It has a nave of four bays, with a single bay chancel, an aisle, and a south porch, containing a 12th century doorway. There is also a tower on the south side, which has a staircase turret at its west end, and has a small spire. There is a small 12th century doorway in its south wall, a survival from the Mediaeval church. In the north aisle are two windows from the original church, the former church's main east window in the east wall, and a smaller window in the west wall. The ceiling is barrel-vaulted in oak, and has carved bosses and other carved figures.
