= Strensall railway station =

Disused railway station in North Yorkshire, England

Strensall
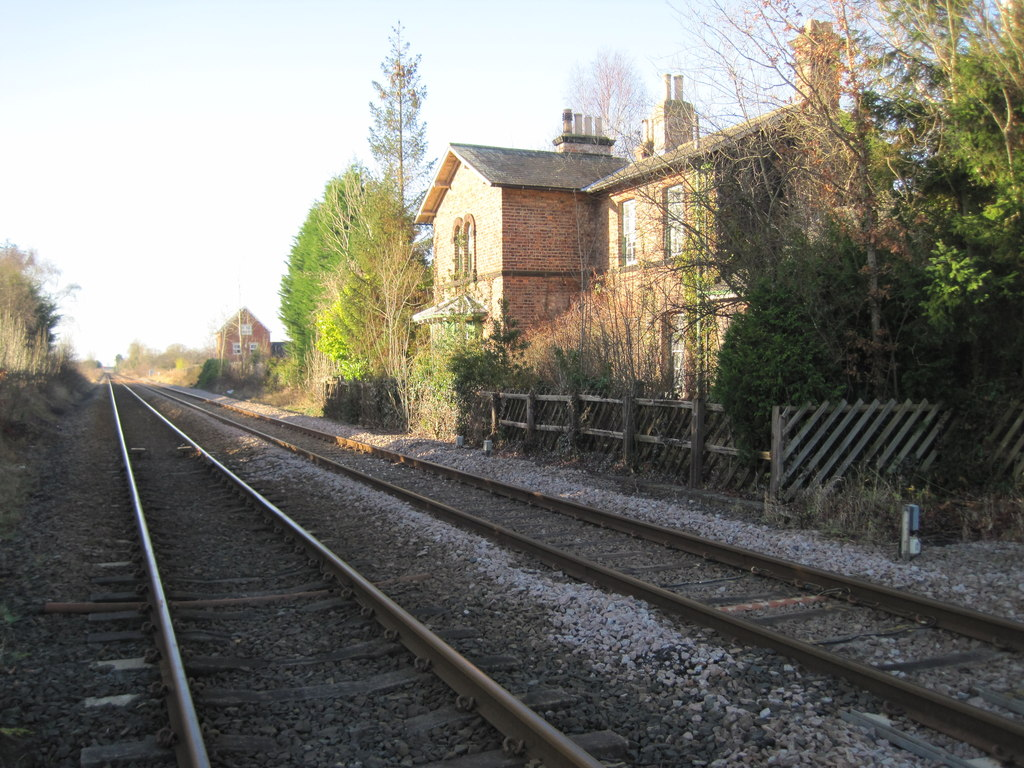
- Site of the former station in 2012

General information
- Location: Strensall, City of York; England
- Coordinates: 54.04013°N 1.02669°W
- Grid reference: SE638608
- Platforms: 2

Other information
- Status: Disused

History
- Original company: York and North Midland Railway
- Pre-grouping: North Eastern Railway
- Post-grouping: London and North Eastern Railway

Key dates
- 5 July 1845: opened
- 22 September 1930: closed
Location

Strensall railway station was a minor railway station serving the village of Strensall in North Yorkshire, England.

== History ==
It is situated on the York to Scarborough Line and was opened on 5 July 1845 by the York and North Midland Railway. It closed on 22 September 1930. The station building is grade II listed. Currently a private residence.

== Reopening ==
There has been talk of reopening a station at Strensall as well as neighbouring Haxby for a number of years. These reopenings were part of the 2001 local transport plan. But in 2010 even the more modest plan to reopen only Haxby was postponed pending further funding decisions. Recently calls for a new rail link north of York station were reignited during the local elections of 2019 where Strensall was cited for its lost links and possible redevelopment.

== Route ==
Preceding station	Historical railways	Following station
Strensall Halt; Station closed; Line open	Y&NMR; York to Scarborough Line	Flaxton; Station closed; Line open
