= Towthorpe, North Yorkshire =

Hamlet in the City of York, England

Coordinates: 54.018610°N 1.032340°W

Towthorpe
- Hamlet
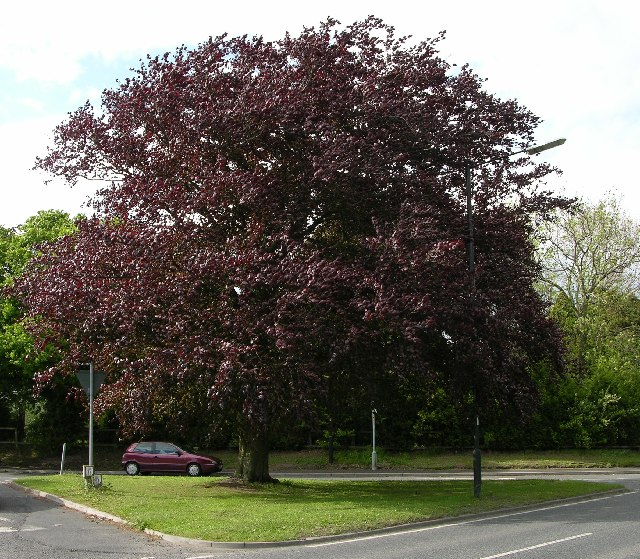
- Towthorpe Junction

- Location within North Yorkshire
- Population: 1,967
- OS grid reference: SE635585
- Civil parish: Strensall with Towthorpe
- Unitary authority: City of York
- Ceremonial county: North Yorkshire
- Region: Yorkshire and the Humber
- Country: England
- Sovereign state: United Kingdom
- Post town: YORK
- Postcode district: YO32
- Police: North Yorkshire
- Fire: North Yorkshire
- Ambulance: Yorkshire
- UK Parliament: York Outer

Towthorpe (/ˈtaʊθɔːp/ TAU-thorp) is a hamlet in Strensall with Towthorpe civil parish in the unitary authority of the City of York in North Yorkshire, England. It lies between Huntington and Strensall about 5 miles (8 km) north of York.

According to the 2001 census, the parish had a population of 1,967. The data for the 2011 census is included in the civil parish of Strensall with Towthorpe, which had a population of 6,047.

The hamlet was historically part of the North Riding of Yorkshire until 1974. It was then a part of the district of Ryedale in North Yorkshire from 1974 until 1996. Since 1996 it has been part of the City of York unitary authority. Towthorpe was formerly a township in the parish of Huntington, in 1866 Towthorpe became a separate civil parish, on 1 April 2009 the parish was abolished and merged with Strensall to form "Strensall with Towthorpe".

The name Towthorpe derives from the Old Norse Tofiþorp meaning 'Tofi's secondary settlement'.

Part of the Strensall training area and adjacent Queen Elizabeth Barracks are located to the north-east of the hamlet. The training area was formerly Strensall and Towthorpe Common.
