= Scarborough Bridge, York =

Railway bridge in Yorkshire, England

Scarborough Bridge
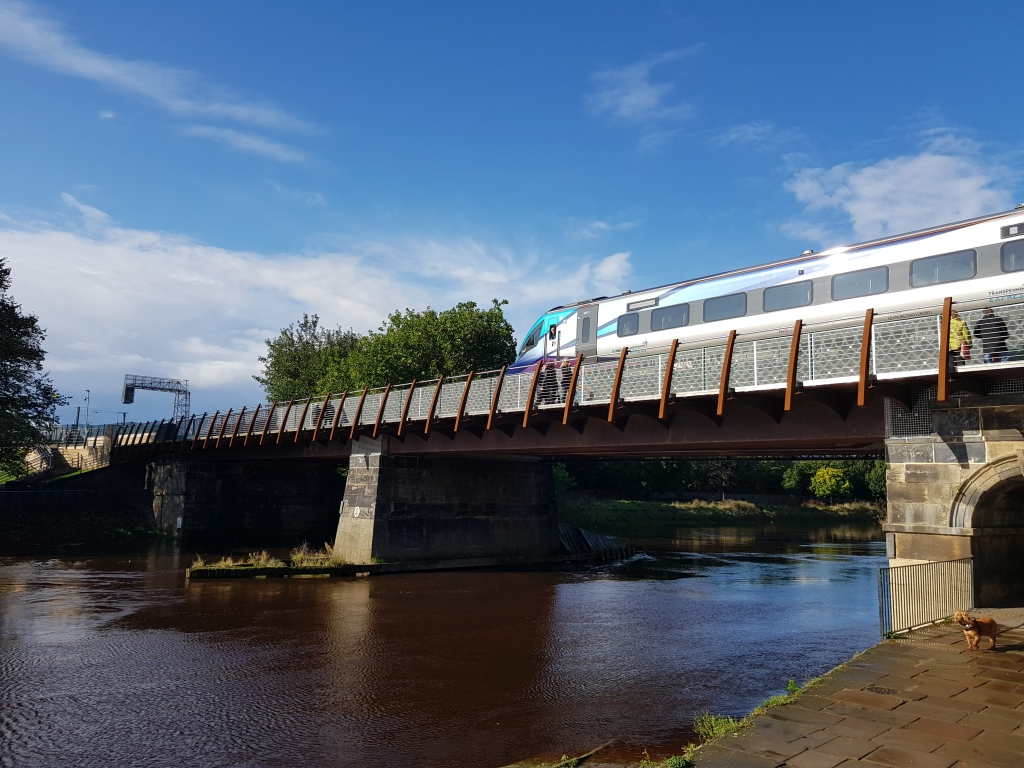
- Train crossing Scarborough Bridge
- Coordinates: 53.9612°N 1.0928°W
- OS grid reference: SE596520
- Carries: York–Scarborough line
- Crosses: River Ouse
- Locale: York, England
- Owner: Network Rail

Characteristics
- Total length: 3 chains (200 ft; 60 m)

Rail characteristics
- No. of tracks: 2
- Track gauge: 4 ft 8 1/2 in (1,435 mm) standard gauge

History
- Built: 2015
- Construction cost: £6 million

Statistics
- Daily traffic: Two trains per hour

Location
- Interactive map of Scarborough Bridge

Scarborough Bridge carries the railway line to Scarborough over the River Ouse in York, England. The first bridge was built in 1845, and has been renovated and rebuilt at least twice since its initial opening. A new bridge was installed in 2015 at a cost of £6 million. The first bridge had a pedestrian walkway which was located between the two running lines on the deck of the bridge, this was later moved to the east side of the bridge (in the 1875 rebuild), and finally, in the 2010s rebuild, the walkway became a separate wider bridge. The bridge is still in daily use carrying Trans-Pennine services between Scarborough and either York, or Manchester and Liverpool.

== History ==
The foundation stone of the bridge was laid on 28 March 1845, and the bridge was opened to traffic on 7 July 1845 (at the same time as the rest of the line). The bridge was located much nearer to the city centre than was originally intended; the residents of Clifton objected to the line going through their suburb, and so even though the line had been originally meant to access the railway station from the north, (joining onto the line going to Northallerton) it went straight into what is now the main station area. (Note: Trains to Scarborough had to reverse out of the dead-end station at York before continuing eastwards over the River Ouse. When the through station at York was built in 1877, this practice ceased.) The first (1845) bridge, was built within five weeks without the aid of a cofferdam for the central pier; the water level of the river was lowered by reducing the amount held back by the Naburn Lock further downstream on the Ouse. The pier was supported on 28 cast-iron piles which were driven 24 feet (7.3 m) down into the bed of the river. The main structure consisted of two 75 feet (23 m) long cast-iron girders, (the width of the river being 148 feet (45 m) at the bridging point, though both ends had a small viaduct section) and cost £3,918 (equivalent to £490,000 in 2023). The long cast-iron girders were delivered to the site by river, rather than by rail.

The 1845 bridge was 32 feet 6 inches (9.91 m) wide with timber guard rails on the bridge deck for the trains, and small fences guarding the walkway from the running lines. The bridge was later reinforced with timber struts along its length, as a bridge of similar design collapsed in Chester. (Note: Both bridges had been designed by Robert Stephenson, but the one at Chester over the River Dee was lined with ballast whereas the York bridge had rails connected to the timbers of the bridge deck. Fawcett points out that the design of the girder structure was slightly different, but also the weight of the ballast had added to the dead weight of the structure, and at the time of the bridge collapsing, it had just had another layer of ballast laid upon it to dampen down vibrations of passing trains.) Besides carrying the railway tracks for the York to Scarborough line, the bridge also has a smaller pedestrian section on the eastern side (facing into the city). The original pedestrian walkway on the bridge of the 1845 structure was between the two running tracks, accessed through the stone archways, but this was moved to the eastern side in 1874, when the bridge was rebuilt with girders between the stone piers. The design of the gaps in the archways is barrel-vaulted, and each of the stone piers is 7 feet 9 inches (2.36 m) wide, both having a staircase inside in which pedestrians could access the path up onto the deck of the bridge. The stone piers on either side are made of sandstone, and are fixed into the ground with timber piles as there was no bedrock near the surface to drill into. As a result of the main station in York being re-sited in 1877, the bridge is now only 130 feet (40 m) east of the platforms of York station.

The rebuild of 1874–1875, was prompted by the new station in York being constructed which required the bridge height to be increased by 4 feet (1.2 m). The works were carried out by John Butler of Leeds who tendered a cost of £3,918 (equivalent to £459,000 in 2023). Until the rebuilding of 2015, pedestrians still used the northern pier to access the pedestrian bridge. However, the southern abutment had been closed off to footfall in the late 1870s, when it was noticed that it was subsiding. The river was scouring the bank at that side and in the course of reinforcement, the pedestrian access was permanently closed.

By the 21st century, it was recognised that the 1870s ironwork was corroded, and that timbers within the structure were rotten. The bridge was subject to regular inspections, and though the rail traffic across the bridge was light, due to issues with the load upon it, engineers needed to be present whenever the bridge was used by visiting steam trains.

The bridge was replaced in 2015, with four new spans, each weighing 65 tonnes (72 tons) built by Mabey of Chepstow and costing £6 million (equivalent to £8,404,000 in 2023). In 2019, the footbridge on the eastern side was also replaced with a wider structure that was accessible for people on bikes and those with prams. The new bridge was started in 2018 with an outline cost of £4 million. Estimates show that the bridge is used by 3,000 people per day, but access to the footbridge was restricted when the river was in flood; the new structure would be accessible when the Ouse was flooded. Usage surveys carried out on the bridge after it opened in 2019, show that footfall across the bridge had increased to 4,000 people per day. The unused stairways in the bridge ends were treated with a structural resin which completely fills all the holes and gaps in the void of the stonework. Due to the difficult nature of installing the new bridge with a crane, the nearby Marygate car park was closed off and one of the engineers built a model of the project in Lego to explain the complexity of the project to other workers involved in reconstructing the bridge.

The bridge carries the York to Scarborough railway line, which has an hourly service of one train each way between Scarborough and either York, Manchester or Liverpool run by TransPennine Express.

== See also ==
- Bridges of York
