= Strensall with Towthorpe =

Civil parish in the City of York, England

Coordinates: 54°2′13.200″N 1°2′16.800″W

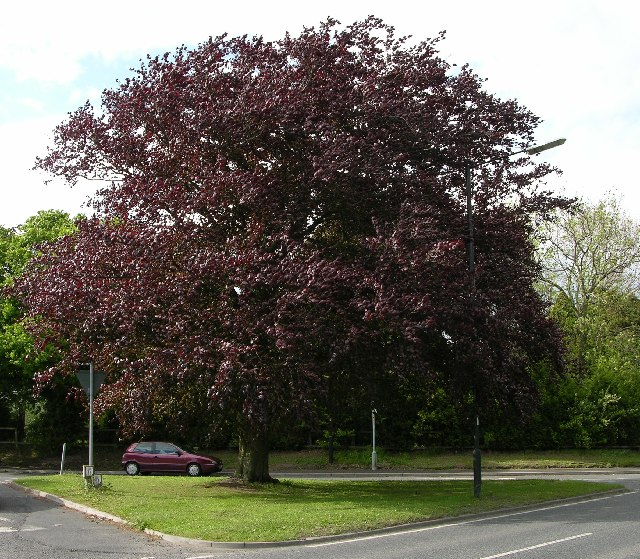
- Towthorpe Junction

- Location within North Yorkshire
- Population: 6,047
- Civil parish: Strensall with Towthorpe
- Unitary authority: City of York
- Ceremonial county: North Yorkshire
- Region: Yorkshire and the Humber
- Country: England
- Sovereign state: United Kingdom
- Post town: YORK
- Postcode district: YO32
- Police: North Yorkshire
- Fire: North Yorkshire
- Ambulance: Yorkshire
- UK Parliament: York Outer

Strensall with Towthorpe is a civil parish in the unitary authority area of the City of York in North Yorkshire, England. According to the 2011 census, it had a population of 6,047.

== History ==
Both Strensall and Towthorpe were historically part of the North Riding of Yorkshire until 1974. They were then a part of the district of Ryedale in North Yorkshire from 1974 until 1996. Since 1996, they have been part of the City of York unitary authority. On 1 April 2009 the parishes of "Strensall" and "Towthorpe" were abolished to form "Strensall with Towthorpe".
