= Haxby Hall =

Estate near York, England

- Location within North Yorkshire
- 54°00′36″N 1°04′23″W
- Location: North Yorkshire, England

History
- Built: 1790
- Demolished: 1960

Site notes
- Area: 22 acres (8.9 ha)

Haxby Hall was an English house on York Road in Haxby, York. It was built in 1790 on 22 acres (89,000 m^{2}) of land, and was grade II listed.

In 1923, Haxby Hall was the residence of William Abel Wood, JP During the Second World War, it was used to house evacuees from Hull.

In 1950, the then owner, Kenneth Ward, donated the house's pleasure grounds to the village which now comprise the Ethel Ward Memorial Playing Field. As of 2021, this contains a playground, netball courts and a scout hall. It hosts village events and local football and netball teams.

The house, reduced to three acres (12,000 m^{2}) of grounds, was demolished in 1960, and replaced in 1965 by the 52 bed Haxby Hall Residential Care Home, and an adjoining ambulance station.
