= Strensall Common =

Protected area in North Yorkshire, England

- Site of Special Scientific Interest
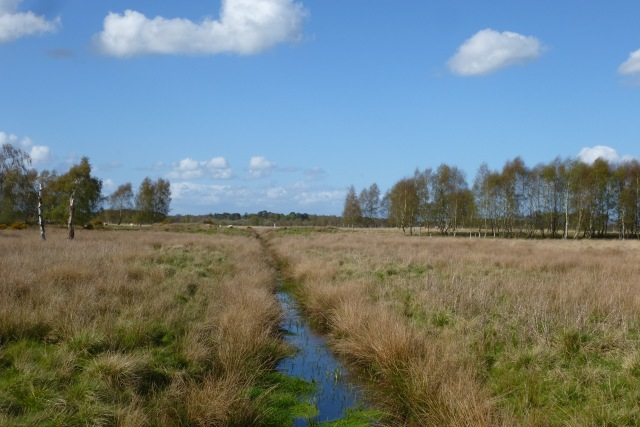
- Drain on Strensall Common

- Location within North Yorkshire
- Location of Strensall Common.
- Area of search: City of York
- Grid reference: SE650605
- Coordinates: 54.029°N 1.008°W
- Interest: Biological
- Area: 1,430.1 acres (578.75 ha)
- Notification date: 1965

Strensall Common is 1,430 acres (578.75 ha) of common land to the east of the village of Strensall, in the City of York, England. The land is recognised as an SSSI and a Special Area of Conservation, with much of it being owned and maintained by the Ministry of Defence, which has a rifle range on its southern edge. Strensall Common is the only known site in England where the moth epione vespertaria has been recorded. The common was also noted historically as being a collection site for the thread of the araneus diadematus spider. The thread was used as a graticule in optical instruments.

== History ==
Strensall Common is an area of heathland some 6 miles (9.7 km) north of York and just to the east of the village of Strensall in the City of York, England. The Strensall Common Act 1884 (47 & 48 Vict. c. ccix) allowed the War Department to compulsory purchase 1,080 acres (440 ha) of land to the east of the main road at Strensall covering a large portion of what is Strensall Common. The camp had been used since 1876 and had trained more than 8,000 soldiers a year, but they were billeted in tents. A newspaper report of 1883 noted that the 3rd Battalion of the West Yorkshire Regiment had been on training there and found the land "unhealthy" and had a distinct lack of drinking water. In the eventuality more than 1,900 acres (770 ha) was used to build the camp (Queen Elizabeth Barracks) and the ranges, with the surrounding common being drained to provide the land for the military. The common was wracked by wildfires in 1891, with a large section blackened.

The military barracks were renamed after Queen Elizabeth II in the 1950s after her coronation. Villagers still had the right to use and graze on the common land but under an 1885 act the government bought out 52 families at £200 each (equivalent to £22,000 in 2025). Access to the common using a local by-law is still permitted when the military ranges are not in use.

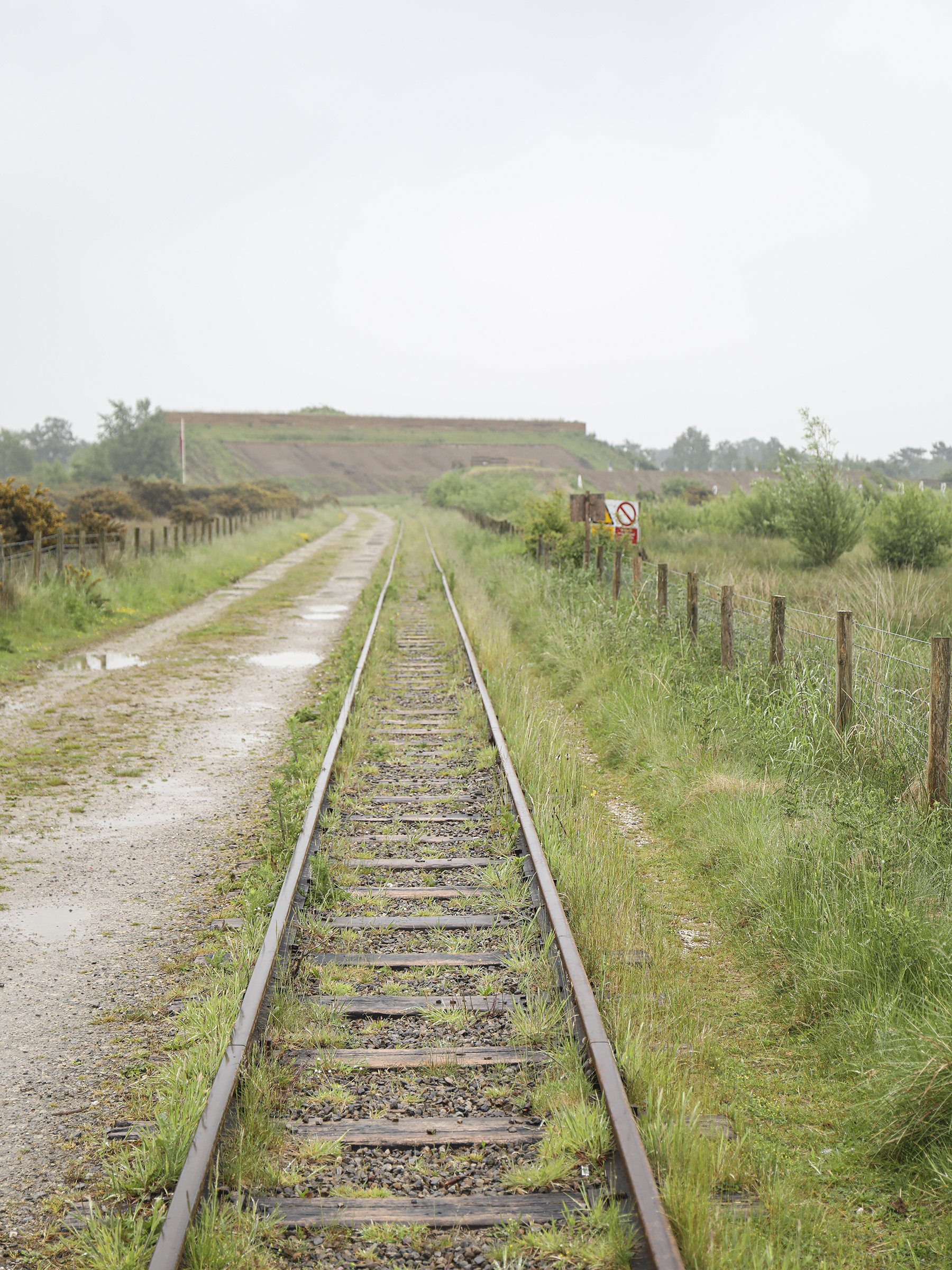
The railway on Strensall Common

The military opened a narrow-gauge railway to serve the six rifle ranges, each of which had a siding from the main running line. Six wagons (one for each range) were employed to take the targets out to the range, but these were 'manhandled', as no locomotive is recorded as being used on the 3-foot (0.91 m) gauge system. Strensall Common, and Towthorpe Common, were designated as SSSIs in 1965, and an overlapping site covering an area of 1,410 acres (572 ha) was designated as an SAC and SCI in 2004 and 2005 respectively.

Whilst the military training area has been used mostly for light weapons training, some tank training has taken place on the site, and the ruts left behind on the common by the tank tracks have become home to the round-leaved sundew. In 2016, the British Army announced plans to close the military barracks at Strensall by 2021, but the scheme was put back to 2024, when Natural England objected to the site being used to provide 550 homes. Also, as part of its designation as a special area of conservation, homes are not allowed to be built within 1,300 feet (400 m) of the common, and any development within 3.4 miles (5.5 km) of the common is not to have an adverse effect upon it. In March 2024, the MOD announced that the decision to close the Queen Elizabeth Barracks and Towthorpe Lines had been cancelled and both sites will remain in military use.

In May 2025 a wildfire "scorched large swathes" of the nature reserve requiring ten fire crews to tackle the blaze. The fire reached within 600 metres (2,000 ft) of the dark-bordered beauty moth's habitat.

== Geology ==
A borehole was explored in 1884 as part of the War Department's development of the common land for military training. It was dug to a depth of 1,161 feet (354 m) and showed the rock was mostly marl, clay, sandstone and shale. The surface soil consists mainly of aeolian sands, although some peaty material exists in the lower-lying wet areas of the common. The land undulates gently from 66 feet (20 m) to 82 feet (25 m) AOD.

== Description and species ==
The SSSI relating to Strensall Common describes it as being more than 1,430 acres (578 ha) in area, with most of it being managed by the British Army as part of its military training area. However 54 acres (22 ha) is managed by the Yorkshire Wildlife Trust. The common is home to more 60 species of bird and more 150 varieties of plant. There are several ponds and pools across the common, with Kidney Pond, Pillwort Scrape and Crossley's Pond being the best known. Between them the ponds have been, or are, host to smooth newts, palmate newts, common frog, common toad and common lizards. The ponds are also host to idioptera linnei, a small species of crane fly that is rare in Northern England and is listed as endangered.

Strensall Common is noted as being the only known site in England where epione vespertaria are present. Epione vespertaria (the dark-bordered beauty moth) can be affected by grazing cattle eating the leaves on which the moth lays its eggs. Despite this, Hebridean sheep are used to keep the grass down in summer time. Another noted species is the pond mud snail, which is present in the ponds on the common. The pond mud snail is listed as 'vulnerable' by the IUCN. During the 20th century the Vickers company had a factory in York specialising in lenses and optical instruments. The cobwebs of the araneus diadematus spider were collected on the common and then used by the company's master craftsman as graticules or fine markings within telescopes, microscopes and surveyors’ instruments.

Adders are known to be on the common, and in 2022 and 2023 they were reported to have bitten several dogs that had gone into the long grass. Stonechats, snipe, curlew, woodlark and long-eared owl are among the many bird species on the site and whilst nightjars have been observed on the common it is thought that they nest elsewhere, using the common only for food.
