= Strensall =

Village in the City of York, England

Coordinates: 54.04006°N 1.03436°W

- Village
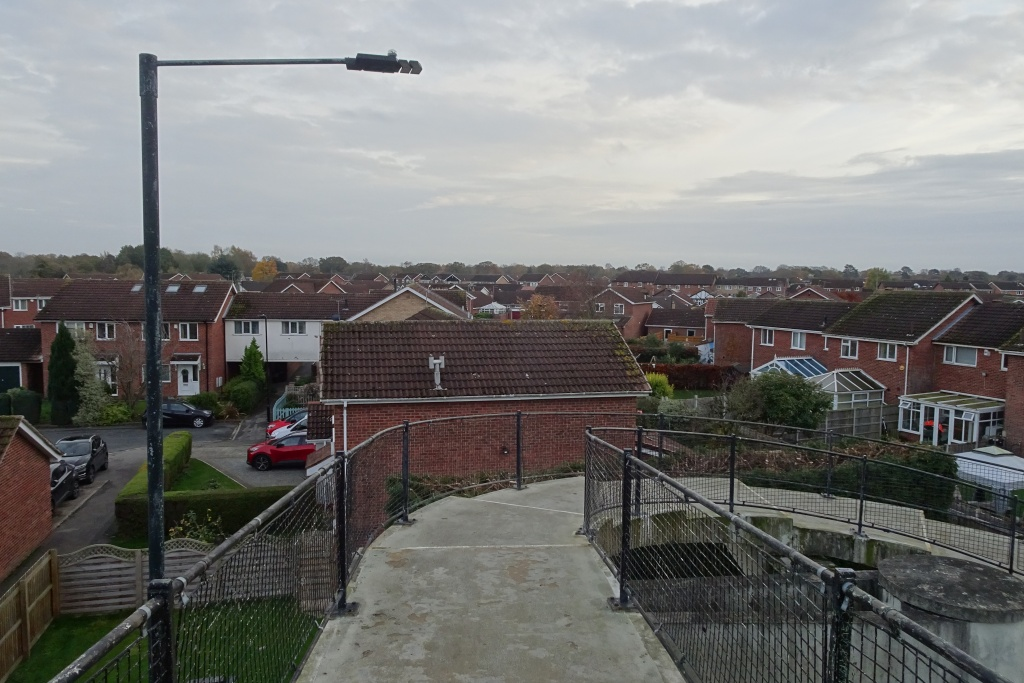
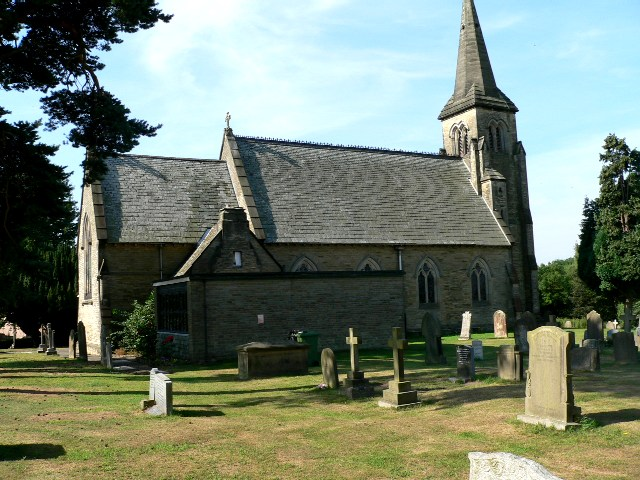
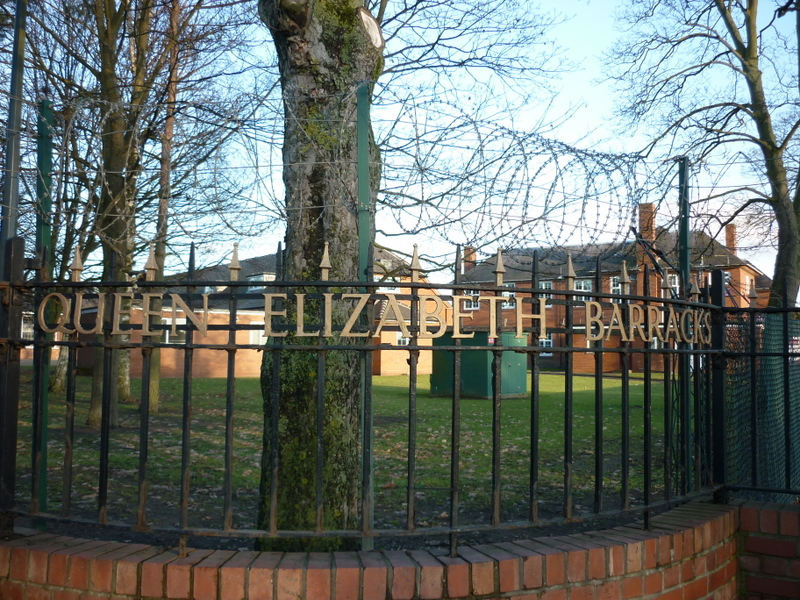
- View over Strensall Parish Church The Barracks

- Location within North Yorkshire
- Population: 6,055 (2021 census)
- OS grid reference: SE633608
- Civil parish: Strensall with Towthorpe
- Unitary authority: City of York
- Ceremonial county: North Yorkshire
- Region: Yorkshire and the Humber
- Country: England
- Sovereign state: United Kingdom
- Post town: York
- Postcode district: YO32
- Dialling code: 01904
- Police: North Yorkshire
- Fire: North Yorkshire
- Ambulance: Yorkshire
- UK Parliament: York Outer

Strensall is a village in the Strensall with Towthorpe civil parish in the unitary authority of the City of York in North Yorkshire, England, on the River Foss north of York and north-east of Haxby.

The village was historically part of the North Riding of Yorkshire until 1974. It was then a part of the district of Ryedale in North Yorkshire from 1974 until 1996. Since 1996 it has been part of the City of York unitary authority.

The nearby Strensall Common is a Special Area of Conservation, an example of lowland heathland habitat covering over 5 km^{2}. The southern part is designated as a Site of Special Scientific Interest. Strensall also has an army firing range and training area both of which belong to the Ministry of Defence.

Formerly, Strensall was itself a civil parish, covering an area of 2,908 acres. On 1 April 2009 the parish was abolished and merged with Towthorpe to form the current parish.

== History ==
Archeological finds of pottery shards and Samian tableware indicate that Strensall may have been the site of a Roman farmstead.

Strensall is referred to in the Domesday Book of 1086 as Streonaeshalch, after Streona, a personal name, and halch, a corner of land. The name has altered through the centuries from Strenshale in the 11th century, to Stranessale in the 14th century and to Strencile or Strencham alias Trencham in the 17th century.

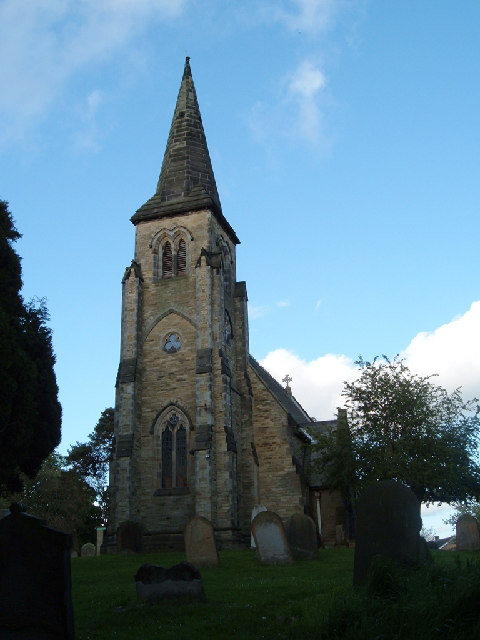
St Mary's Church, Strensall

The Venerable Bede wrote in his Historia Ecclesiastica gentis Anglorum that the abbey at Streanaeshalch hosted the synod in 664 which determined that the Celtic Christian tradition would be abandoned in favour of Roman Catholicism in the Kingdom of Northumbria. Today, historians generally refer to this event as the Synod of Whitby, but whether the location of the synod was in fact Strensall rather than Whitby remains a matter of debate.

The Domesday Book records that, immediately before the Norman Conquest, the estate and parish of Streonshalch was owned by York Minster and held by two men called Saxford and Thorkhill. Saxford was a deacon and Thorkhil was probably a thegn. Following the Conquest in 1066, Strensall became part of the vast tract of England given by William the Conqueror to his half-brother Robert, Count of Mortain, who in turn gave Strensall to his follower, Nigel Fossard, the first Lord of the Manor of Strensall. However, by 1086, Strensall was once again in the hands of York Minster.

York Minster owned many estates such as Strensall which the various archbishops gave to their canons to provide them with an income while they worked for the church. The canons who held these estates were known as prebendaries and the estates, prebends. In 1547 the prebend of Strensall was confiscated from York Minster by the Duke of Somerset, Lord Protector of England. He sold two lots of the property to Lord Wharton before restoring the remainder of the prebend to the Minster a fortnight later. The Robinson family, influential in York and the region, leased Strensall from successive prebendaries from the late 1500s until the late 1700s. The family included Metcalfe Robinson and William Robinson.

Medieval Strensall was laid out in a typical pattern, with narrow fronted plots of land extending back from the street frontage. The parish church stands at the north-west end of the village, the Hall with its moat and large grounds being a short distance further north. On the same site probably stood the manor-house of 1649 and 1757 which also had a moat. Strensall remained basically an agricultural village until well into the 20th Century, though it also had a brick and tile works and a tannery.

To the south of the village lies Strensall Camp, formed by the War Office in 1884 for training troops and now known as Queen Elizabeth Barracks.

== Demography ==
Following the 2021 census, the Office for National Statistics defined a Strensall built-up area, which had a population of 6,055 at the census.

The 1881 census records the population as being 446. According to the 2011 census the parish had a population of 6,047.

== Governance ==
Strensall was in the Ryedale parliamentary constituency until the 2010 general election when it was transferred to the newly created constituency of York Outer.

Strensall forms its own ward in the City of York Council, together with the villages of Stockton-on-the-Forest and Earswick. As of May 2023, it is represented by Tony Fisher and Paul Healey of the Liberal Democrats.

The village is part of the Strensall with Towthorpe Parish Council. There are 14 councillors in total.

== Geography ==
The soil is naturally wet very acid sandy and loamy soil laid over a subsoil of white and grey sandstone. The land lies for the most part about 50 ft above sea level. The River Foss flows from the north-east of the village in a south and south-westerly direction towards Towthorpe. It is crossed by three bridges. About a quarter of a mile east of the village is the disused Strensall station on the York and Scarborough branch of the North Eastern railway.

=== Strensall Common ===
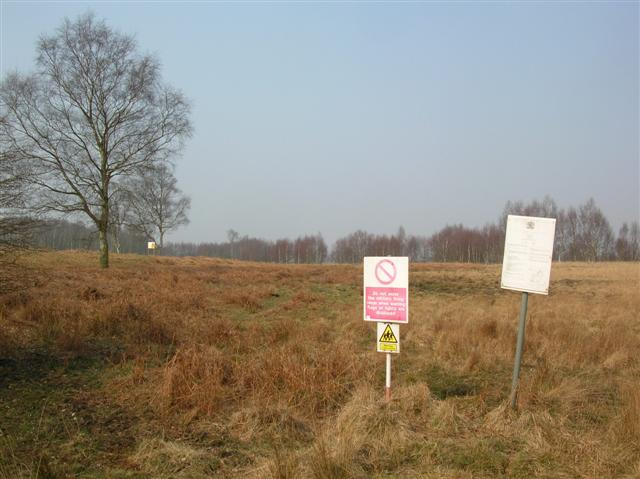
Strensall Common

Strensall Common lies to the east of the village and forms part of the surrounding lowland heath. There are a number of different habitats, such as wet heath, dry heath and birch/oak woodland with areas of standing water. There are over 150 plant species including, marsh cinquefoil, marsh gentian, round-leaved sundew and petty whin.

There are over 60 species of bird including curlew, stonechat, whinchat, and both green and great spotted woodpecker. Amongst the numerous insects to be found are green and purple hairstreaks, the dark-bordered beauty, bog bush cricket and glowworm. Other wildlife seen here include red fox, European hare and harvemouse. Hebridean sheep and Highland cattle graze during summer to keep down vegetation.

The site is maintained by the Yorkshire Wildlife Trust.

== Economy ==
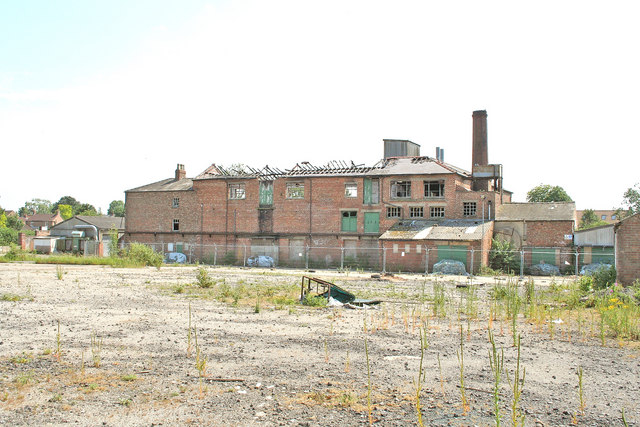
Derelict Tanning Factory

In the 19th century employment was found in a tannery in the village. There were also the Strensall Pottery and Britannia Pottery near the village. Though there is some employment at the local Barracks, the village is mostly a dormitory for commuters to nearby York.

== Transport ==
First York operate a service through the village as part of the York City Centre to Strensall route (Number 5 and 5a).

There are three level crossings within Strensall as it lies on the York to Scarborough line but there is no station any more. Strensall railway station was a minor railway station serving the village. It was opened on 5 July 1845 by the York & North Midland Railway and closed on 22 September 1930.

== Community ==
Strensall has three local grocery shops plus a post office, three pubs, a bakery, a hairdressers, a fish & chip shop and Chinese takeaway. It also has a library and a medical centre. Its sports facilities include 2 playing fields, one with changing rooms; three floodlit tennis courts; two football pitches and one astro pitch and five small parks. There are 20 half plot allotments on New Lane run by the council and were established in 2008. There are also 14 plots run by the Parish Council on Northfield Lane.

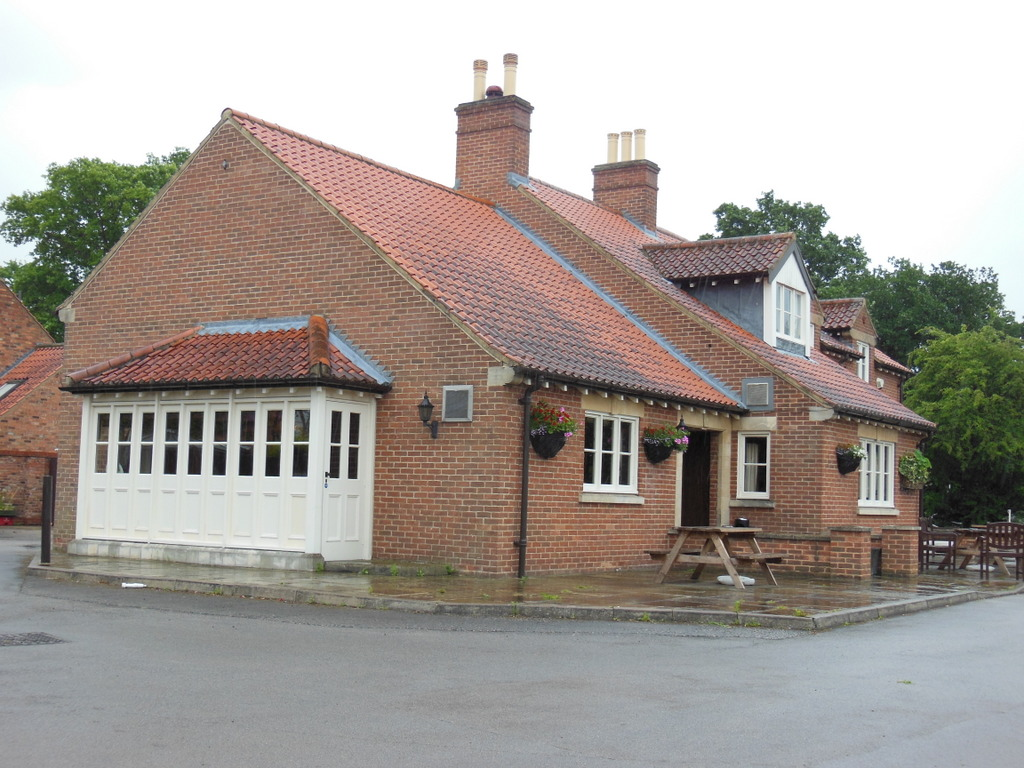
The Six Bells

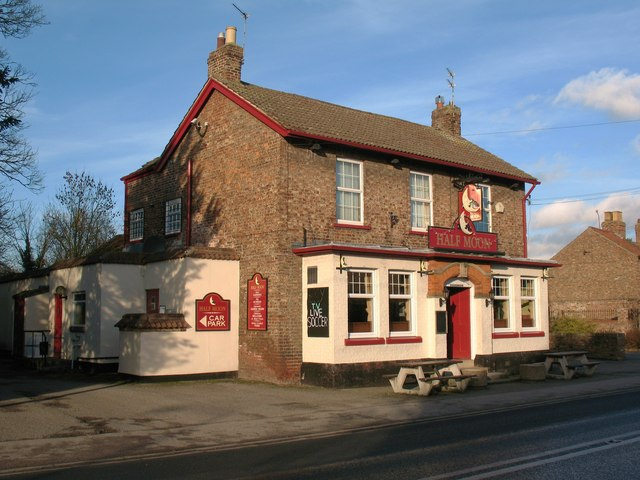
The Half Moon

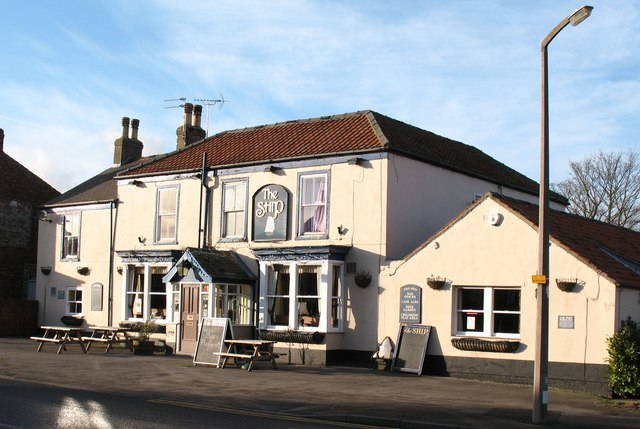
The Ship

== Religious sites ==
A Wesleyan chapel existing in Strensall from 1823 was succeeded by a new building in 1895. Between 1879 and 1889 a Primitive Methodist chapel was built in the village.

The parish church of Strensall is St Mary the Virgin. The current building was designed by J. B. and W. Atkinson, built in sandstone and roofed in Westmoreland slate. It was consecrated by the Archbishop of York in 1866 after the old building, originally dedicated to St James, was destroyed about 1798 or 1800. There are also the Methodist Chapel and St Wilfred's Garrison Church.

== Education ==
Strensall falls within the secondary education catchment areas for Huntington School in the northern outskirts of York. Robert Wilkinson is the local primary school and was founded in 1718 from money left by a local farmer of that name. It moved to its present location on West End in 1972.

== Sports ==
Strensall is the home of the York Golf Club. Strensall Football Club 1XI play in Division Two of the York and District Football League.
