= Flaxton railway station =

Disused railway station in North Yorkshire, England

Flaxton
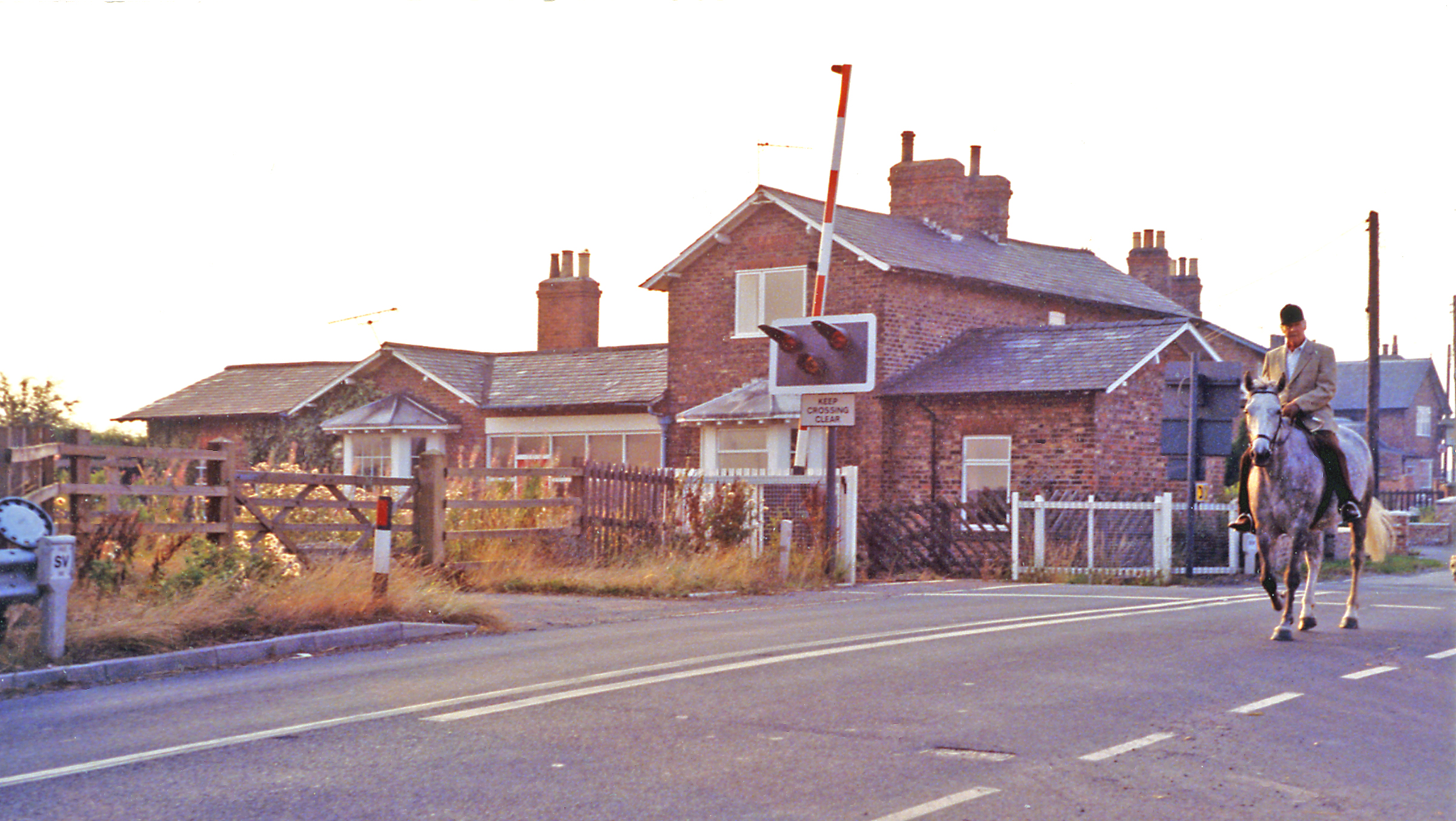
- The former station in 1991

General information
- Location: Flaxton, North Yorkshire; England
- Coordinates: 54.061575°N 0.972711°W
- Grid reference: SE673633
- Platforms: 2

Other information
- Status: Disused

History
- Original company: York and North Midland Railway
- Pre-grouping: North Eastern Railway
- Post-grouping: London and North Eastern Railway

Key dates
- 5 July 1845: opened
- 22 September 1930: closed to passengers
- August 1964: closed to goods traffic
Location

Flaxton railway station was a railway station on the York to Scarborough Line serving the village of Flaxton, North Yorkshire, England.

It was opened to traffic on 7 July 1845 along with all the other stations on the line. Excluding York it was the seventh busiest station on the line in terms of passenger numbers recording an annual average of 13,502 passengers between 1902 and 1914. Thereafter the passenger numbers varied with totals dropping by 60% to 8,100 in 1926.

The station and all other intermediate stations on the line (barring Malton and Seamer) closed to passengers in September 1930. The closures allowed the LNER to speed up holiday traffic to Scarborough, but the station remained open for goods traffic until August 1964.

The station's level crossing is still extant but the signal box closed in 1989. A risk assessment carried out in 2012 stated that it carried 34 trains per day with 1,485 vehicles and 297 pedestrians/cyclists using the crossing per day.

| Preceding station | Historical railways | Following station |
|---|---|---|
| Strensall; Station closed; Line open | Y&NMR; York to Scarborough Line | Barton Hill; Station closed; Line open |
