= Queen Elizabeth Barracks, Strensall =

British Army location in Yorkshire

Queen Elizabeth Barracks
- Strensall
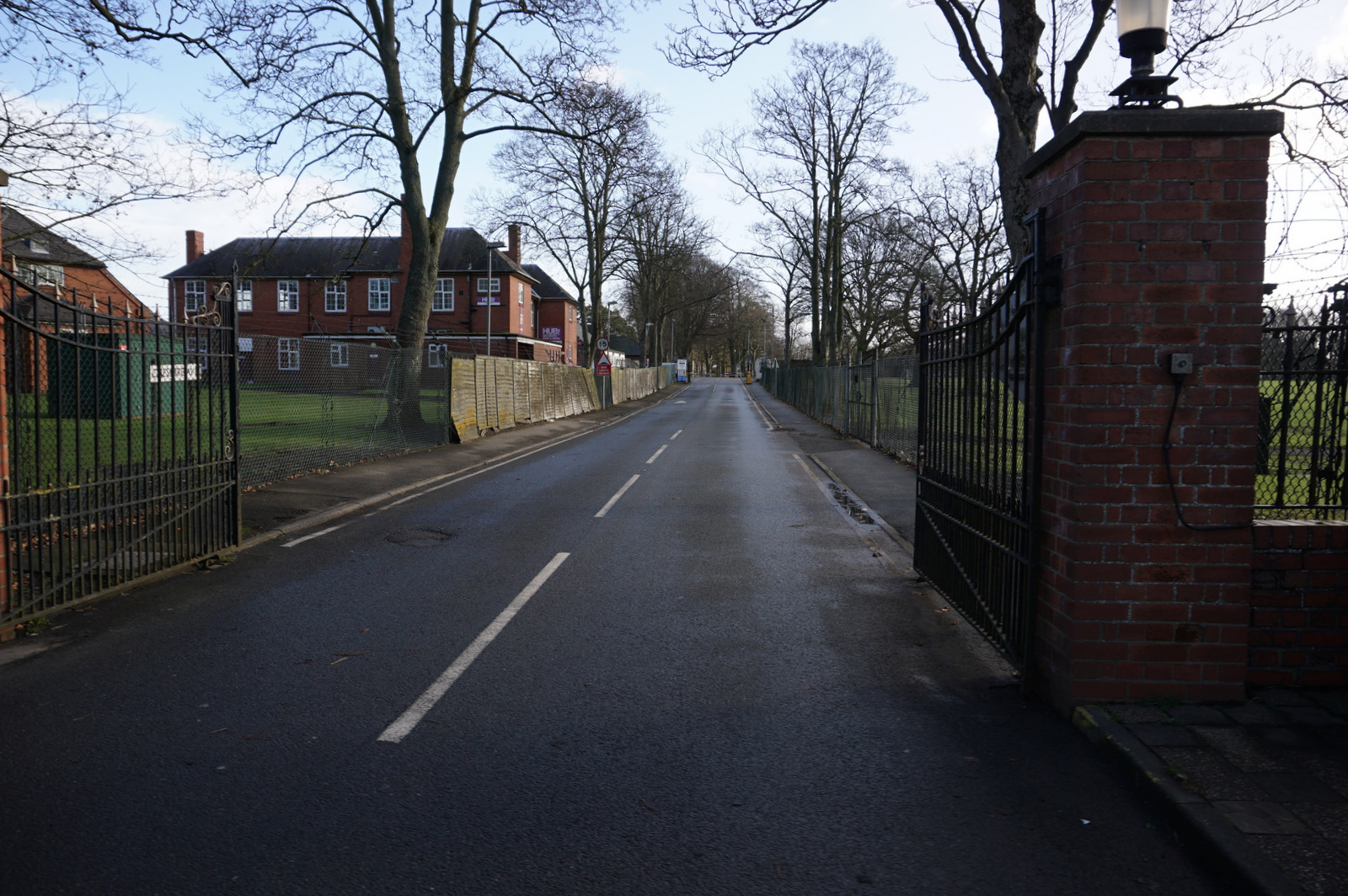
- Entrance to Queen Elizabeth Barracks

Site information
- Type: Barracks
- Owner: Ministry of Defence
- Operator: British Army

Location
- Location within North Yorkshire
- Coordinates: 54°1′39″N 01°2′30″W

Site history
- Built: 1884
- Built for: War Office
- In use: 1884-Present

Garrison information
- Garrison: York
- Occupants: Headquarters, 2nd Medical Brigade

Queen Elizabeth Barracks is a British Army installation in Strensall, North Yorkshire, England. It opened in the 1880s, and since 2016, it has been under threat of closure, but was reprieved in 2024.

== History ==
Strensall Camp, which covers about 1,800 acres (730 ha) and stretches to Towthorpe (to the west), was formed by the War Office in 1884 for training troops. The land that formed the common and Lord's Moor itself was bought in 1876 for £300,000, from the then lord of the manor, Leonard Thompson and other landowners. This arrangement was made permanent through the Strensall Common Act 1884 (47 & 48 Vict. c. ccix). The act was part of the response of the government to the Cardwell Reforms, a series of reforms of the British Army by Secretary of State for War Edward Cardwell between 1868 and 1874 designed to put the British Army on a more professional footing and to create reserve forces stationed around the country. The main purpose of the act was stated as:

Whereas in pursuance of the Military Forces Localisation Act, 1872, (Note: Military Forces Localization Act 1872 (35 & 36 Vict. c. 68)) the Secretary of State for the War Department (in this Act referred to as the Secretary of State) has purchased, by agreement, the soil in the common known as Strensall Common, in the parish of Strensall, in the north riding of the county of York, the uninclosed portions of which are in this Act referred to as Strensall Common:

And whereas the object of such purchase was to obtain an area for a military training ground and store depot in the north of England, including the erection of stores, magazines, rifle practice, and other military purposes, and it is expedient to make such provision hereinafter appears for acquiring the rights of common and other rights in and over Strensall Common, and otherwise respecting the use thereof for military purposes.

Though the Ministry of Defence exercises all legal rights over all of the training area, the Strensall Common Act 1884 enshrines the rights of civilians to have common access rights when not in use for military purposes. When training commenced, it was home to up to 8,0000 soldiers under canvas, until permanent buildings were erected in 1880. The camp was an important mustering point for troops prior to mobilisation for the First World War. During the Second World War, the camp was also the training ground for the local Haxby and Wiggington Home Guard.

The barracks were renamed Queen Elizabeth Barracks in the 1950s, and went on to become the regional centre for infantry training as the Yorkshire Brigade Depot in 1960. This followed the 1957 Defence Review, that resulted in the amalgamation of a number of battalions and regiments, and the renaming of the Yorkshire and Northumberland Brigade to become simply the Yorkshire Brigade.

The barracks then became the depot of the King's Division in 1968, following the unification of the Yorkshire Brigade with the Lancastrian and North Irish Brigades. Recruit basic training included drill, weapons training, fieldcraft as well as recreational opportunities, before passing out.

On 11 June 1974, the Provisional Irish Republican Army planted and exploded devices at the camp, though there was no loss of life.

== Future ==
In November 2016, the Ministry of Defence announced that the site would close in 2021. This was subsequently extended to 2024: however, an announcement in March 2024 stated that the base will be retained as a depot for the British Army's 2 Med Group.

== Site details ==
The current site has capacity for a turnover of 120,000 accommodation spaces to be used in each training year. There is separate messing facilities for Junior Ranks, Senior Non Commissioned Officers and Officers. Other facilities include workshops, Motor Transport (MT) garage and offices. Entrance to the site is from Strensall Road which forms the western boundary of the camp. A number of sporting facilities are also on site and include grass pitches for football, rugby, hockey and cricket. Like a number of military establishments, the barracks has its own church; St Wilfred's.

The geology of the site consists of a bedrock of Sherwood Sandstone. There are drift deposits that belong to the Sutton Sand Formation.

== Current units ==
Current units based at the site are:

=== British Army ===
- Army Training Unit (North East)
- Headquarters, 2nd Medical Brigade
  - Medical Operational Support Group, Royal Army Medical Service (V)
  - 21 Multi-Role Medical Regiment, Royal Army Medical Service
  - 306th Hospital Support Regiment, Royal Army Medical Service (V)
  - 335th Medical Evacuation Regiment, Royal Army Medical Service (V)
  - Central Reserve Headquarters, Royal Army Medical Service (V)
  - Army Medical Service Training Centre

=== Cadets ===
- Headquarters, Yorkshire (North and West) Army Cadet Force
- Strensall Detachment, B Company, Yorkshire (North and West) Army Cadet Force
- 4th Light Brigade Combat Team Cadet Training Team
