= James Demaine =

British architect (1842–1911)

- Born: 1842; Bolton Abbey, West Riding of Yorkshire, England
- Died: 6 May 1911 (aged 68–69); York, England
- Occupation: Architect
- Spouse: Rosalie Agnes Leonard (m. 1891)
- Children: 4 (step)
- Parents: James Demaine (father); Emma Demaine (mother)

James Demaine (1842 – 6 May 1911) was an English architect, mainly active in the Gothic Revival style.

== Life ==
Born at Bolton Abbey to Emma and James Demaine senior, a gardener and farmer, he was an architect's pupil by 1861 and joined the York-based firm of Peter Atkinson II, J. B. and W. Atkinson (now Brierley Groom) in 1870. He became a partner in 1874 after John's death, taking sole control following William's retirement in 1878. Walter Henry Brierley became a partner in 1885, and he and Demaine worked closely together until Demaine's retirement in 1889. He married Rosalie Agnes Leonard, a widow with four children, in early April 1891 in York. He died there in 1911.

== Selected works ==
- St Mary's Church, Haxby (1878)
- Church of St Mark, Bury (1882–83), closed in 1985 and subsequently demolished
- All Saints, Shiptonthorpe (1883), restoration only
- All Saints' Church, Wistow (1883–84), restoration only
- St Michael le Belfrey, York (1885), organ case

=== With Brierley ===
- All Saints' Church, Bolton Percy (1890), restoration only
- All Saints' Church, Rufforth (1895)
- Midland Bank, Doncaster (1897)
