= St Mary's Church, Haxby =

Church in Haxby, North Yorkshire, England

St Mary's Church
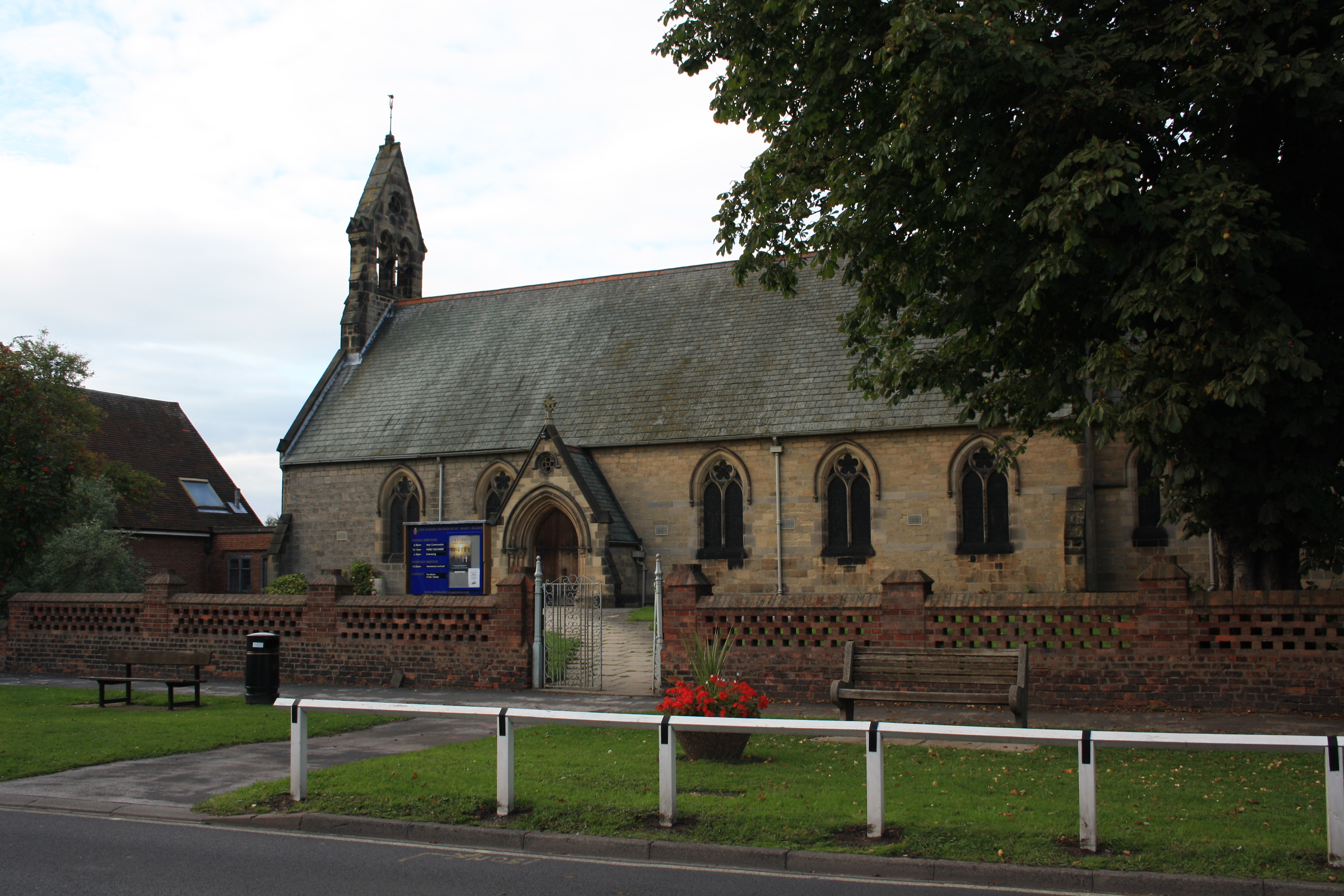
- The church, in 2010
- St Mary's Church
- 54.0169°N 1.0755°W
- OS grid reference: SE 60672 58271
- Location: Haxby, North Yorkshire
- Address: 46 The Village, Haxby
- Country: England
- Denomination: Church of England

History
- Status: Active
- Dedication: Mary, mother of Jesus
- Consecrated: 1878

Architecture
- Architect: James Demaine
- Style: Gothic revival
- Construction cost: £2,300

Specifications
- Materials: Stone

Administration
- Province: York
- Diocese: York
- Archdeaconry: York
- Deanery: York

St Mary's Church is the parish church of Haxby, a town north of York in England.

The first church in Haxby was constructed in about 1328. In the 16th century, it was replaced with a building on a new site, but by the mid 19th century it was in poor repair. It burned down in 1876, and a new church was constructed on the same site, to a design by James Demaine. It is in the Gothic Revival style and was completed in 1878, at a cost of £2,300. In 1911, the nave was extended by three bays, a porch was added, and the turret was replaced by a bellcote, the new work being by C. Hodgson Fowler. A vestry was added in 1921, and the church was reordered in 1985, and a balcony was added.

The church is built of stone, with a slate roof. It has a long nave and a lower chancel. Inside are various memorials to the Hodgson family. There is a single bell, dated 1621.
