= York–Scarborough line =

Railway line in North Yorkshire, England

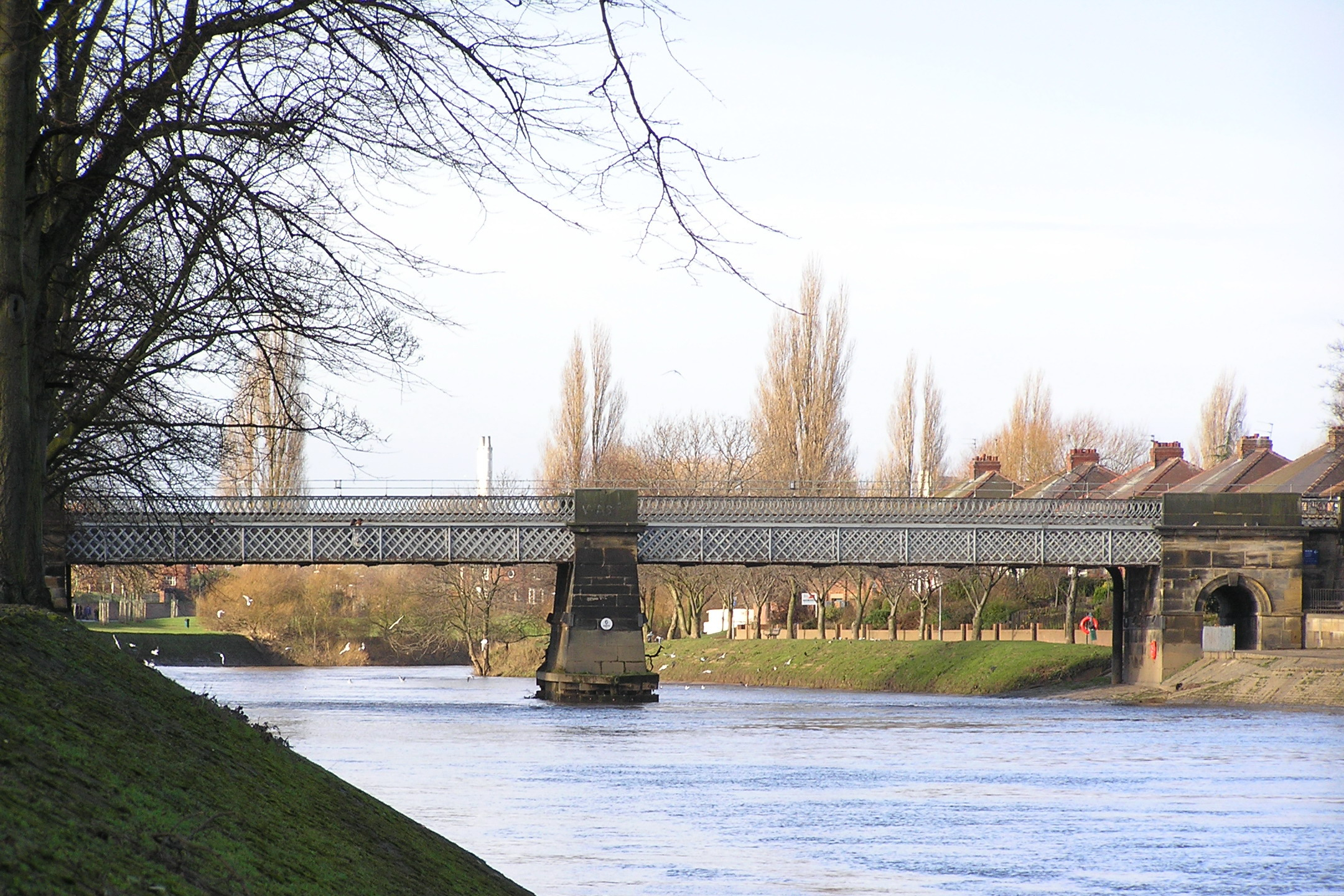
- Scarborough Railway Bridge, York

Overview
- Owner: Network Rail
- Locale: North Yorkshire
- Stations: 4

Service
- Type: Heavy rail
- Operator: TransPennine Express

Technical
- Line length: 42 miles 6 chains (67.7 km)
- Track gauge: 4 ft 8 1/2 in (1,435 mm) standard gauge
Route map
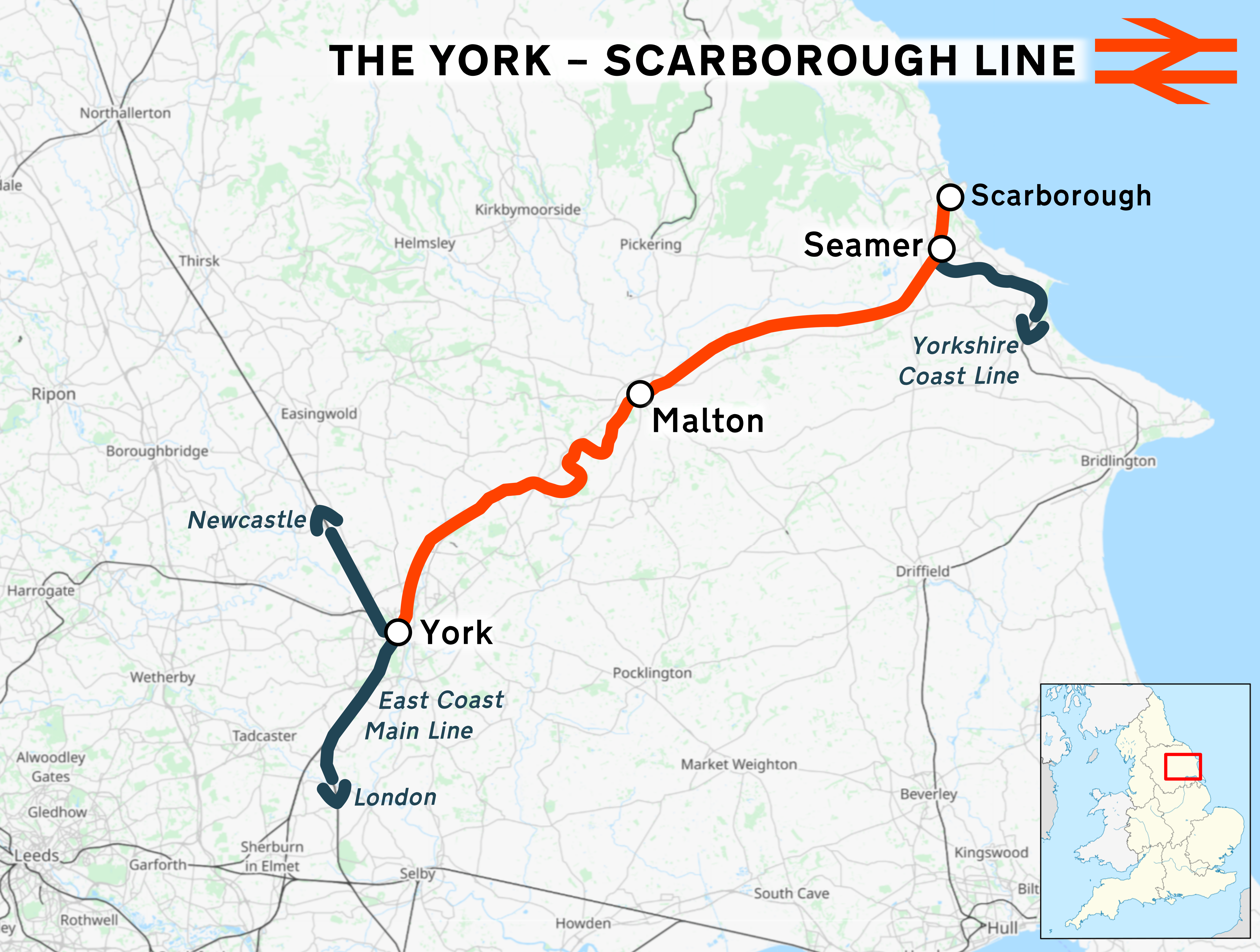
(Click to expand)

The York–Scarborough line runs between the city of York and the town of Scarborough in England. Towns and villages served along the way are Malton, Norton-on-Derwent and Seamer.

== History ==
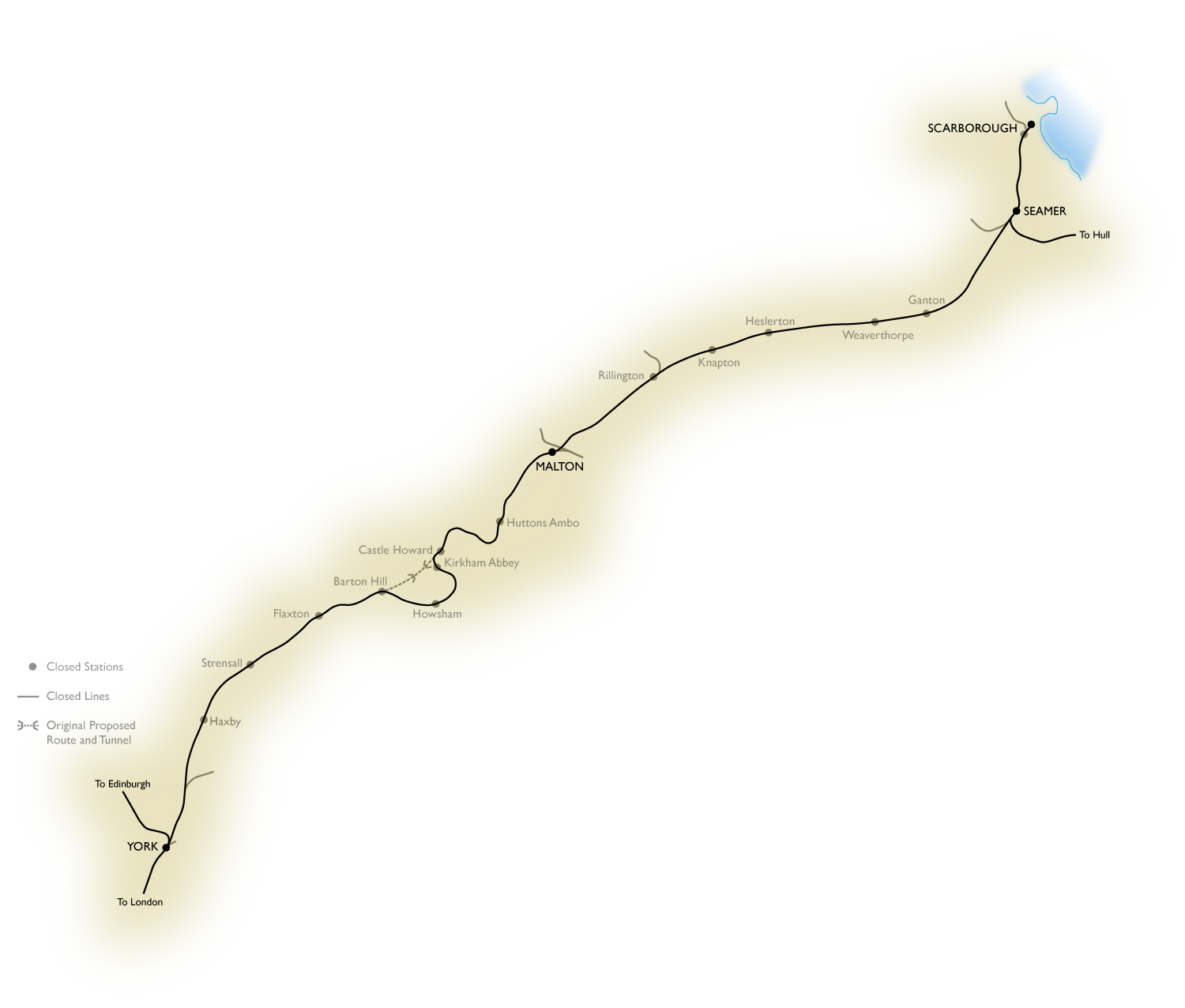
York to Scarborough railway showing closed stations

The line was built by George Hudson's York and North Midland Railway and opened on 7 July 1845. The line was constructed remarkably quickly by the standards of the time, being approved under the York and North Midland Railway (York and Scarborough) Act 1844 (7 & 8 Vict. c. lxi), and taking just one year and three days to complete the 42-mile (68 km) route. This feat was possible because the Y&NMR decided against the more costly and time-consuming option of building a tunnel through the Howardian Hills south of Malton. Instead the chosen route meanders with the River Derwent for around 4 miles (6 km), creating a slower but more scenically pleasant experience for passengers.

The railway line was opened with a ceremony for invited guests who were taken by George Hudson on a train of two engines and 40 first class coaches, which left York at 11:00 am. The line was initially single track and the journey to Scarborough took three and a half hours. In Scarborough the guests were treated to a lunch. After a return journey to York, the guests were treated to dinner in the Guildhall, hosted by the Lord Mayor of York.

The new railway included a 6-mile (10 km) branch from Rillington to Pickering that connected with the horse-worked Whitby and Pickering Railway which the Y&NMR immediately proceeded to take over and upgrade for steam traction.

Most of the intermediate stations on the line were closed to passengers in September 1930 as the number of excursion and holiday trains going straight through to Scarborough during that period meant that the line lacked the capacity to accommodate stopping local services. These services were already seeing a significant decline in passenger numbers prior to their withdrawal due to increased bus competition in the area. The closed stations retained their goods facilities and were maintained for occasional passenger use by excursion trains until the 1960s.

=== Modern ===
There are currently plans to re-open the stations at Haxby and Strensall due to the growth of population in those areas. There have been suggestions to re-open these stations since 1990 when it was pointed out that if they were inside a metropolitan county, then they would be re-opened very quickly. In January 2009 funding to re-open Haxby station was confirmed and in November 2020 it was announced that Haxby station had been successful in its application for money from the New Stations Fund. Construction was expected to start in spring 2025, however, due to financial issues, government money was withdrawn from various railway schemes in July 2024. The City of York Council stated that they remain committed to the scheme. Construction of the new station is now projected to begin during 2026, subject to planning consent and confirmation of funding.

Plans for a station at Strensall have not yet to come to fruition with no progress towards opening a station here having been made since this reopening was announced as part of the 2001 local transport plan.

In 2014, work started on replacing the 1840s built bridge that carries the railway over the River Ouse. Network Rail spent £6 million on the entire project and used boats and pontoons floated on the River Ouse to reach the bridge. The new bridge opened to traffic on 23 February 2015.

The route has 89 level crossings between York and Scarborough; 12 are supervised, 10 automatic and 67 are user-worked crossings. All supervised and automatic crossings and the residual seven signal boxes en route will be closed and control handed over to the York Rail Operating Centre by 2025.

== Services ==
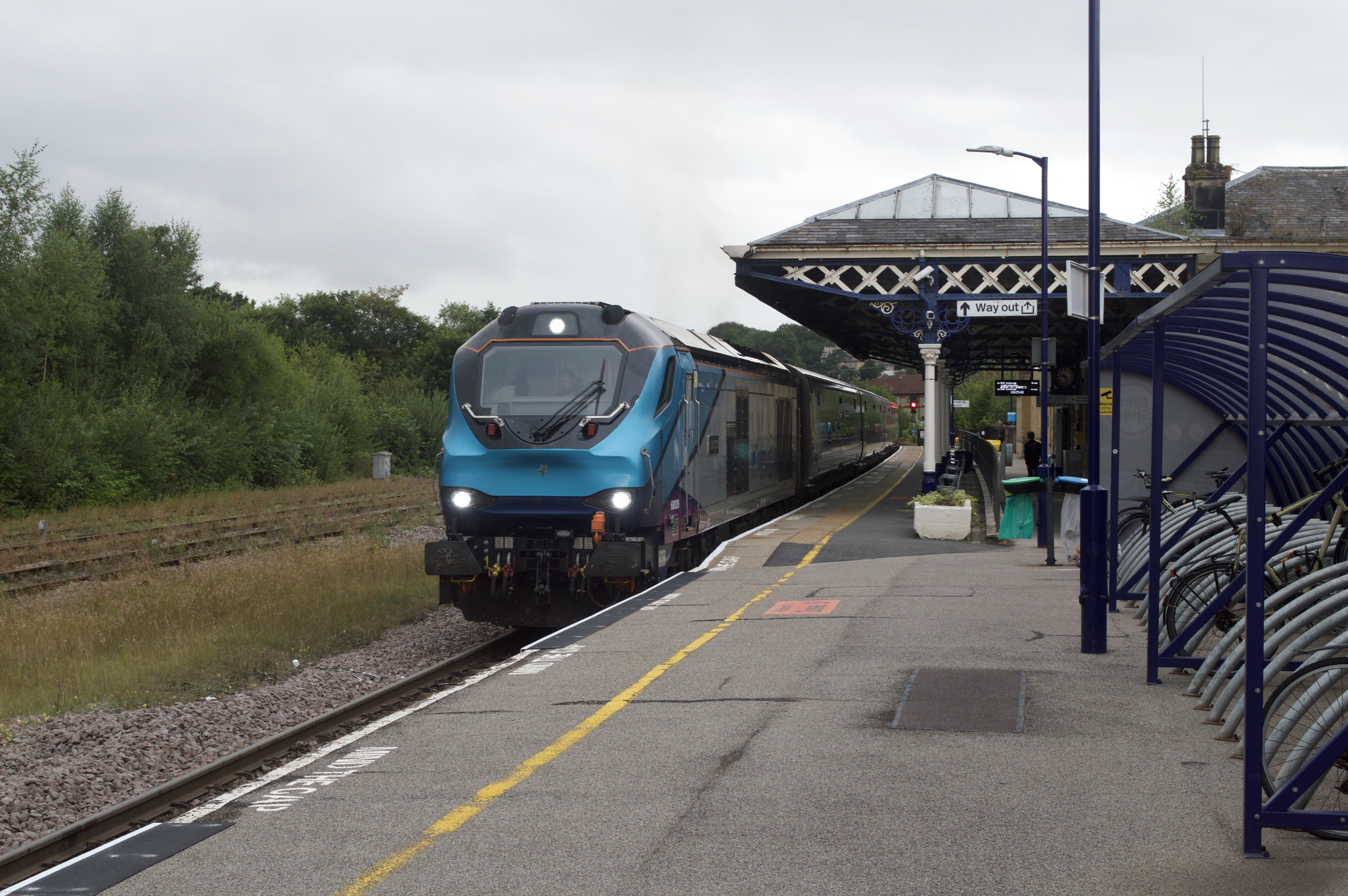
A TransPennine Express Class 68 hauling a Liverpool to Scarborough service through Malton

Services operated along this line are run by TransPennine Express. Services are roughly hourly and operate to and from either York or Manchester. This is part of the North TransPennine route.

Rolling stock on this line has consisted almost entirely of Class 185 DMUs since early 2007. However some Class 802 bi-mode units are also used as of 2025.

Previously, East Midlands Trains ran summer Saturday services between St Pancras and Scarborough, arriving in the morning and returning in the late afternoon. It was quietly phased out, with the service no longer existing under the new operator East Midlands Railway.

Scarborough also sees steam-hauled summer specials from York, hauled by various preserved steam locomotives. These have run most summers since 2002 under the name Scarborough Spa Express.

There is also talk of reinstating the pre-1965 link to Pickering to connect the North Yorkshire Moors Railway to the national network from its southern end, allowing trains from Malton and beyond to reach Whitby. Such a move has been considered but does not seem likely for the foreseeable future.

== Incidents ==
On 25 August 1845 the 12:15 train from York came off the rails 1/4 mile (0.4 km) south of Kirkham Abbey, in the vicinity of Crambe, due to subsidence of an embankment beside the River Derwent. Thomas Cabry was on the engine and hurt his foot in the process. (Brian Lewis 1994: The Cabry Family, p.31).

On 3 February 2009, a car hit the back of a train passing over Knapton level crossing. The driver was taken to hospital, but he was not kept in. There were no casualties on the train. The level crossing is an AHBC – automatic half barrier crossing.
