= Listed buildings in Newton-on-Ouse =

Newton-on-Ouse is a civil parish in the county of North Yorkshire, England. It contains ten listed buildings that are recorded in the National Heritage List for England. All the listed buildings are designated at Grade II, the lowest of the three grades, which is applied to "buildings of national importance and special interest". The parish contains the village of Newton-on-Ouse and the surrounding area. All the listed buildings are in the village, and consist of a church, its lychgate, houses, a public house, an estate lodge, a school and a village hall.

== Buildings ==
Name and location	Photograph	Date	Notes
All Saints' Church; 54.03286°N 1.22140°W		12th century	The church has been altered and extended during the centuries, and was largely rebuilt in 1849 by G. T. Andrews. It is built in rusticated stone, the tower is in sandstone, the spire is in limestone, and the roofs are in stone slate. The church consists of a nave with a clerestory, north and south aisles, a south porch, a chancel with a north vestry, and a west steeple. The steeple has a tower with two stages, and contains slit windows in the lower stage, a west window with a pointed arch, and clock faces. In the upper stages is a band, two-light bell openings, a coved eaves band, gargoyles, an openwork parapet with corner pinnacles, and a recessed spire with thin flying buttresses, lucarnes and a weathervane.
Orchard House; 54.03026°N 1.22033°W	—	Mid-18th century	The house is in red brick with dentilled eaves and a pantile roof. There are two storeys and an attic, and four bays. On the front is a gabled porch, and a doorway with an architrave and a flat soldier-arch. The windows are sashes in architraves, two on the lower floor are tripartite.
Reuse Cottage; 54.03211°N 1.22137°W	—	Mid-18th century	The house is in orange brick on a plinth, with dentilled eaves, and a Welsh slate roof with brick kneelers. There are two storeys and four bays, and a rear outbuilding. The doorway has an architrave and a hood, and the windows are casements under flat brick gauged arches.
The Dawnay Arms; 54.03402°N 1.22154°W		1772	The public house is rendered, with dentilled eaves, and a blue slate roof with shaped kneelers and coping. There are three storeys and four bays, and a later lean-to on the right. On the front is a porch, and a doorway with a plain surround on plinth blocks, and an initialled and dated gabled hood. The windows are sashes, those on the top floor horizontally-sliding.
Norton Lodge; 54.02990°N 1.21956°W		Late 18th century	The lodge at the entrance to the grounds of Beningbrough Hall is in stone. It has a central round-arched gateway on a plinth, with an impost bands extending as cornices, an archivolt with a keystone carved as a head, and flowers in the spandrels. Above it is a corniced pediment with a laurel wreath in the tympanum. The gates are in cast iron. The archway is flanked by single-storey single-bay lodges containing a sash window. On the inner return is a doorway with a plinth, pilasters, a cornice and a blocking course. Flanking the lodges are low coped walls with end piers and capstones, and cast iron railings with spear finials.
Barstow House; 54.03443°N 1.22197°W	—	Early 19th century	The house is in rendered brick, with a modillion cornice and a Welsh slate roof. There are two storeys and five bays, and two rear wings with hipped roofs. In the centre, steps lead to a doorway with pilasters, a fanlight and a cornice. This flanked by bow windows, to the left is a cross window and to the right a French door. The upper floor contains sash windows in architraves, and at the rear is a round-arched stair window.
High Morrow; 54.03376°N 1.22013°W	—	Early 19th century	The house is in red-brown brick with cogged eaves and a pantile roof. There are two storeys and two bays, and a single-storey single-bay addition to the left. The doorway is in the centre, the windows are sashes in architraves, and all the openings have cambered brick arches.
Lychgate; 54.03256°N 1.22106°W		1849 (probable)	The lychgate at the entrance to the churchyard of All Saints' Church was designed by G. T. Andrews. It is in limestone on a chamfered plinth, with quoins, a chamfered waves band, and a stone slate roof with stone coping on corbels, and moulding at the apex. It contains two pointed arches, the left smaller, and a small store room on the left. The arches are double-chamfered, with chamfered quoined jambs, and there are wooden gates with heart finials on the posts.
Old School; 54.03350°N 1.22031°W		1852	The school and master's house to the right are in red brick on a plinth, with stone dressings, quoins, and roofs in Welsh and green slate, with stone coping and ridge cresting. The school has one gabled bay and buttresses, it contains a large mullioned and transomed window with cusped lights, and above it is a cusped spherical triangle and on the apex is a fleur-de-lis finial. The house has two storeys and two bays. On the left is a doorway with a pointed arch and a moulded surround and decorative hinges. To the right is a bay window, and on the upper floor are windows with two round-headed lights.
Parish Hall; 54.03381°N 1.21962°W		1857	An infants' school and master's house, later a parish hall, designed by Rawlins Gould. It is in red brick on a plinth, and has a stone slate roof. There are three bays, the left bay with two storeys and an asymmetrical gable. It contains a doorway with a pointed arch and a quoined surround, and windows with trefoil-headed lights. The bays to the right have a single storey and contain similar windows with a buttress between. In the left return is the doorway to the house, with a quoined and chamfered pointed arch, flanked by mullioned and transomed windows, and to the left is a lean-to.
