= Holy Evangelists' Church, Shipton =

Church in Shipton, North Yorkshire, England

Coordinates: 54°01′25″N 1°09′25″W

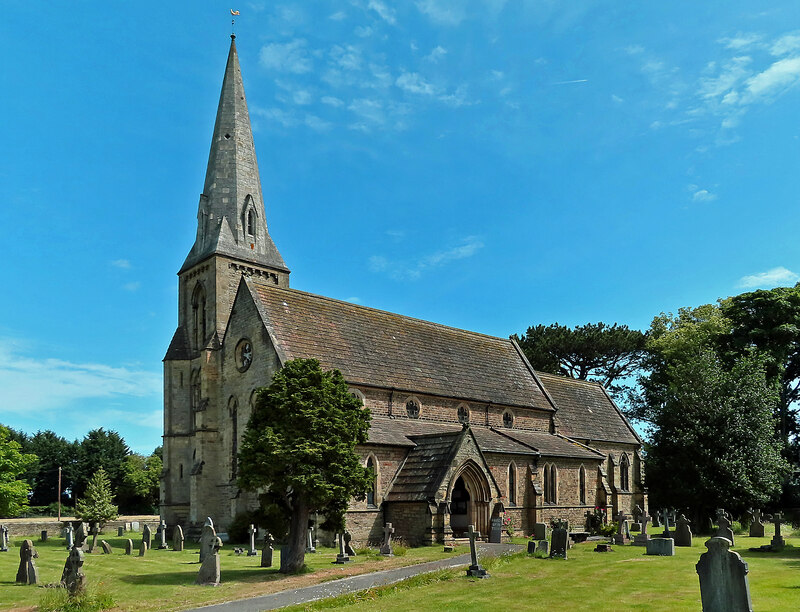
The church, in 2022

Holy Evangelists' Church is the parish church of Shipton-by-Beningbrough, a village in North Yorkshire, in England.

Shipton was historically in the parish of St Cuthbert's Church, Overton. Between 1848 and 1849, a church was constructed in Shipton, funded by Payan Dawnay of Beningbrough Hall. The building was designed by George Townsend Andrews in the Early English style. The building could seat 450 worshippers, and as of 1851 had around 140 attendees across two Sunday services. In 1962, Shipton became the main church of the parish, and later in the decade, the church at Overton was demolished. The church in Shipton was grade II listed in 1986.

The church is built of stone with a stone slate roof. It consists of a nave with a clerestory, north and south aisles, a south porch, a chancel with a north vestry, and a northwest steeple. The steeple has a tower with four stages, a northwest stair turret, angle buttresses, string courses, windows with trefoil heads and hood moulds, bell openings with colonnettes, and a broach spire with lucarnes and small quatrefoils. The clerestory windows are also quatrefoils. Inside, there is a carved and painted reredos and a choir screen with iron gates designed by Temple Moore. The east window has stained glass designed by Thomas Willement.

== See also ==
- Listed buildings in Shipton, North Yorkshire
