= Listed buildings in Bilton, East Riding of Yorkshire =

Bilton is a civil parish in the county of the East Riding of Yorkshire, England. It contains ten listed buildings that are recorded in the National Heritage List for England. All the listed buildings are designated at Grade II, the lowest of the three grades, which is applied to "buildings of national importance and special interest". The parish contains the village of Bilton, the hamlet of Wyton, and the surrounding countryside. The listed buildings consist of houses and associated structures, a chapel and a church.

== Buildings ==
| Name and location | Photograph | Date | Notes |
|---|---|---|---|
| The Old Hall; 53.77937°N 0.24441°W | | Early 13th century | The earliest part is the rear wing, with the main block dating from the late 18th century. The house is in red brick with a dentilled eaves cornice and a pantile roof with raised gables. There are two storeys, and the main block has five bays. The doorway has a fanlight, the windows are sashes, and all the openings have cambered gauged brick arches. The rear wing contains a doorway, and sash windows, some of which are horizontally sliding. |
| Turmer Hall; 53.78692°N 0.24795°W | | 17th century | Parallel rear ranges were added to the house in the early 19th century. The house is in rendered and roughcast brick, on a plinth, with a pantile roof and raised coped gables. On the front is a doorway, and the windows are a mix, including sashes, a lancet window and a replacement window. |
| Southfield Farmhouse; 53.78365°N 0.21116°W | | Mid-18th century | The farmhouse is in colourwashed brick, with a sill band, and a hipped tile roof. There are two storeys, four bays, and a rear wing. Most of the windows are sashes, there are some later replacements, and all have flat gauged brick arches with raised keystones. The entrance is in the rear wing, which is on a plinth and has a floor band. |
| Wyton Abbey; 53.78362°N 0.22028°W | | c. 1765 | The house is in red brick, with floor bands, a modillion eaves cornice and a hipped pantile roof. There are three storeys and five bays. The central doorway has pilasters, a fanlight and a dentilled cornice, and the windows are sashes with flat gauged brick arches and keystones. |
| Wyton Hall; 53.78521°N 0.21229°W | — | 1765 | The house is in colourwashed rendered red brick, with a floor band, an eaves cornice on paired brackets, and a hipped slate roof. There are three storeys, a double depth plan, and a front of three bays, the middle three bays projecting slightly. On the front is a porch with paired Doric columns, a fanlight, a triglyph frieze, a mutule cornice and a blocking course. This is flanked by French windows, and the other windows are sashes under channelled wedge lintels with raised keystones. To the left is a two-storey single-bay extension. |
| The Red House; 53.78329°N 0.21315°W | | Late 18th century | The house is in red brick, with dentilled eaves, raked eaves cornices, and a tile roof with raised coped gables and shaped kneelers. There are two storeys, a double depth plan and five bays, the middle bay projecting slightly under a pediment. In the centre is an Ionic porch and a doorway with sidelights. This is flanked by canted bay windows, and the other windows are sashes with channelled wedge lintels and raised keystones. |
| Ha-ha, Wyton Hall; 53.78475°N 0.21226°W | — | Late 18th to early 19th century | The ha-ha to the south of the house, which is in brick, defines the edge of the former front garden. |
| Wyton Lodge; 53.78367°N 0.21378°W | — | 1836 | The house, designed by J. B. and W. Atkinson, is in grey brick, with stone dressings, a floor band, oversailing eaves and a hipped slate roof. There are two storeys and three bays, the middle bay projecting. On the middle bay is containing a doorway with a rusticated surround, round-headed sidelights and a dentilled pediment. The windows are sashes, those flanking and above the doorway with cambered gauged brick arches, and those on the outer bays of the upper floor with round-headed arches in square-headed openings with rosettes to the spandrels. On the return is a large bow window. |
| Wesleyan Chapel; 53.78241°N 0.21681°W | | 1841 | The chapel is in colourwashed brick, with an eaves cornice and a hipped slate roof. There is a single storey and three bays. In the centre is a doorway under a round-arched window. This is flanked by full-height round-arched windows, all the openings under round gauged brick arches. |
| St Peter's Church; 53.77801°N 0.24674°W | | 1852 | The church, designed by G. T. Andrews in Early English style, is in stone with a stone slate roof. It consists of a nave and a chancel in one unit, a south porch and a north vestry. On the west gable is a bellcote with two pointed openings under a chamfered pointed arch. The windows are lancets. |
