= St Peter's Church, Bilton =

Church in Bilton, East Riding of Yorkshire, England

Coordinates: 53.7780°N 0.2467°W

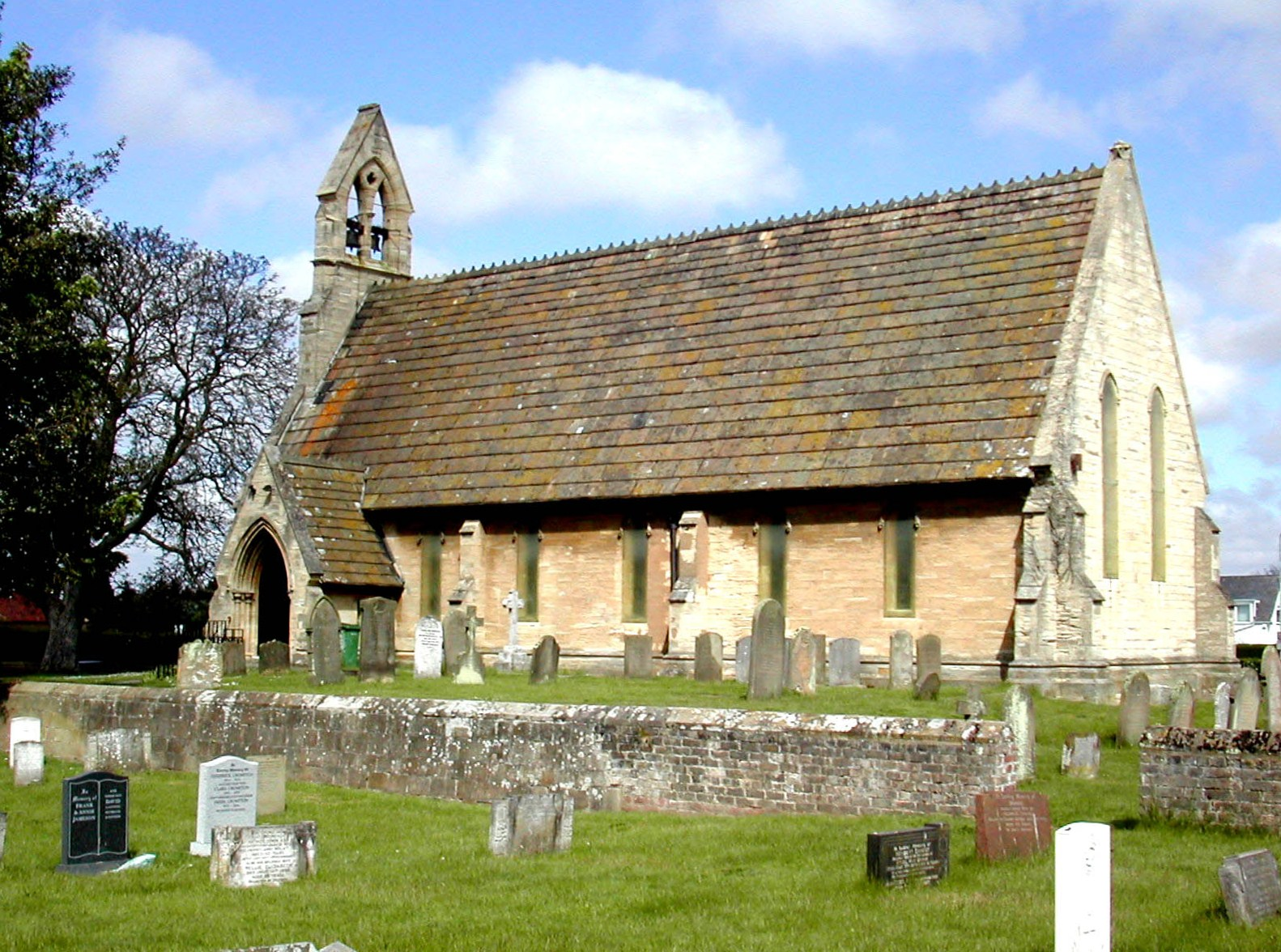
The church, in 2008

St Peter's Church is the parish church of Bilton, East Riding of Yorkshire, a village in England.

There was a church in Bilton in the mediaeval period, originally dedicated to Mary Magdalene, but later to Saint Peter. In 1852, it was rebuilt to a design by G. T. Andrews, on the same plan as the old church, and in a 13th-century style. The building was grade II listed in 1987.

The church is built of stone with a stone slate roof. It consists of a nave and a chancel in one unit, a south porch and a north vestry. On the west gable is a bellcote with two pointed openings under a chamfered pointed arch. The windows are lancets. Inside, there is an octagonal font, a communion rail of Caen stone built in the 1860s, and an ornate reredos installed in 1886. The east and west windows have stained glass from 1852, while the north windows of the nave have glass of 1896 and 1905 by Charles Eamer Kempe.

== See also ==
- Listed buildings in Bilton, East Riding of Yorkshire
