= The Old Hall, Bilton =

Building in Bilton, East Riding of Yorkshire, England

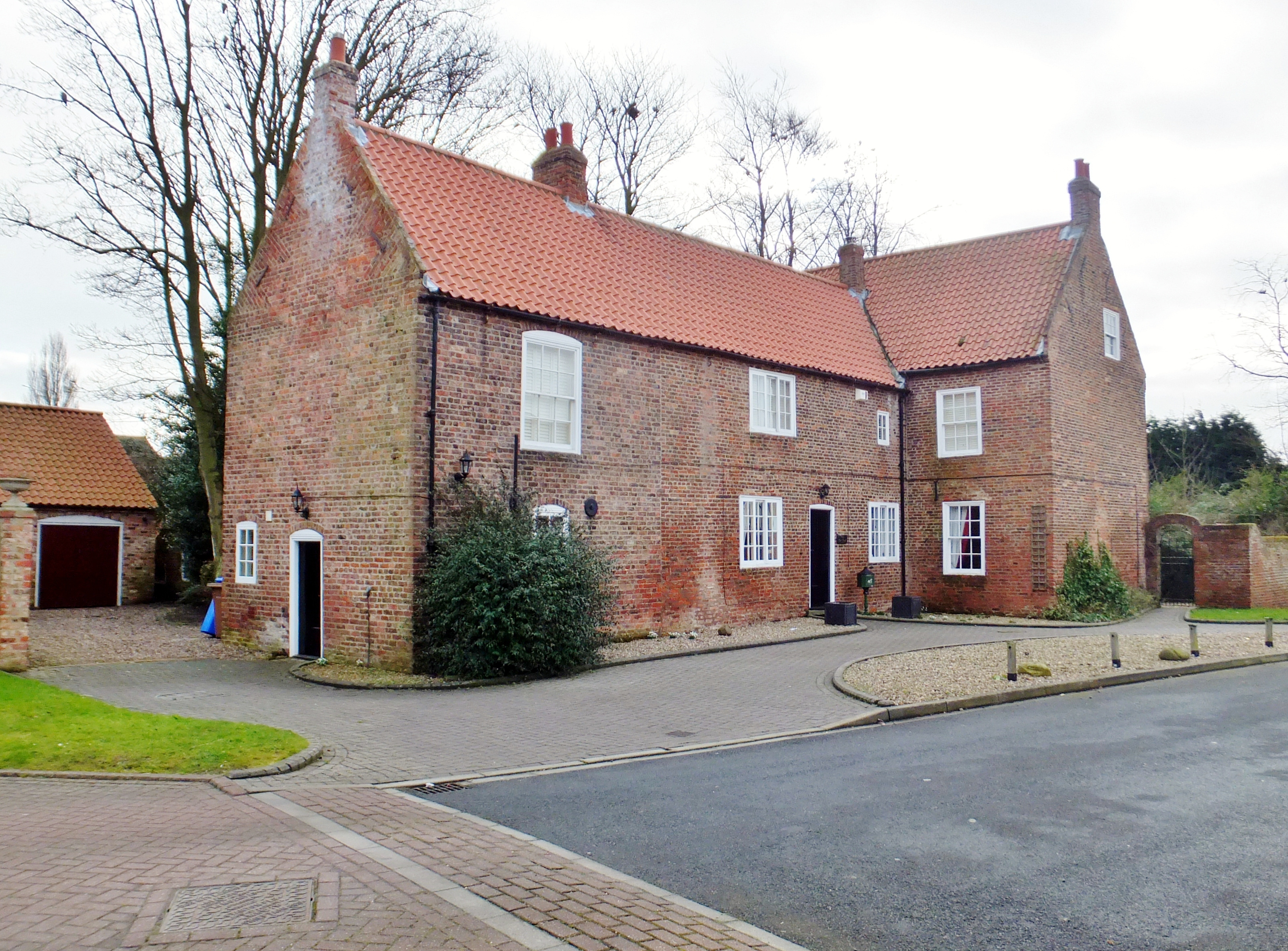
The building, in 2013

The Old Hall is a historic building in Bilton, East Riding of Yorkshire, a village in England.

The building was constructed in the early 13th century. In the late 18th century a larger range was constructed in front of the older building. The building was grade II listed in 1987. It served as a farmhouse for many years, but in 1994 the farmland was built on, and the building was restored as a private house.

The house is built of red brick with a dentilled eaves cornice and a pantile roof with raised gables. It has two storeys, and the main block is five bays wide. The doorway has a fanlight, the windows are sashes, and all the openings have cambered gauged brick arches. The rear wing contains a doorway, and sash windows, some of which are horizontally sliding.

== See also ==
- Listed buildings in Bilton, East Riding of Yorkshire
