= The Dawnay Arms =

Pub in Newton-on-Ouse, North Yorkshire, England

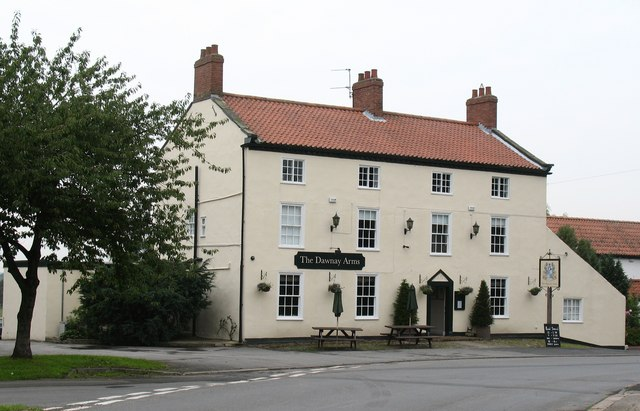
The pub, in 2008

The Dawnay Arms is a historic pub in Newton-on-Ouse, a village in North Yorkshire, in England.

The pub was built in 1772. In the 20th century, it was extended to the right, and a porch was added. The building was grade II listed in 1986. In 2007, the pub was taken over by Kerry Smith and the chef Martel Smith, who restored the building, the work including the removal of the porch. Inside, separate pub and restaurant areas were created, both with stone floors, wooden beams and open fires. By 2022, it appeared in both the Good Food Guide and the Michelin Guide, while in 2020 Tommy Banks selected it as one of the country's best restaurants, recommending it for its Sunday roast.

The pub is rendered, with dentilled eaves, and a blue slate roof with shaped kneelers and coping. It has three storeys and four bays, and a later lean-to on the right. On the front is a doorway with a plain surround on plinth blocks, and an initialled and dated gabled hood. The windows are sashes, those on the top floor horizontally-sliding. Inside, part of the original staircase remains. The top floor was originally one large rooms, but has been subdivided.

== See also ==
- Listed buildings in Newton-on-Ouse
