= Wyton Methodist Church =

Chapel in Wyton, East Riding of Yorkshire, England

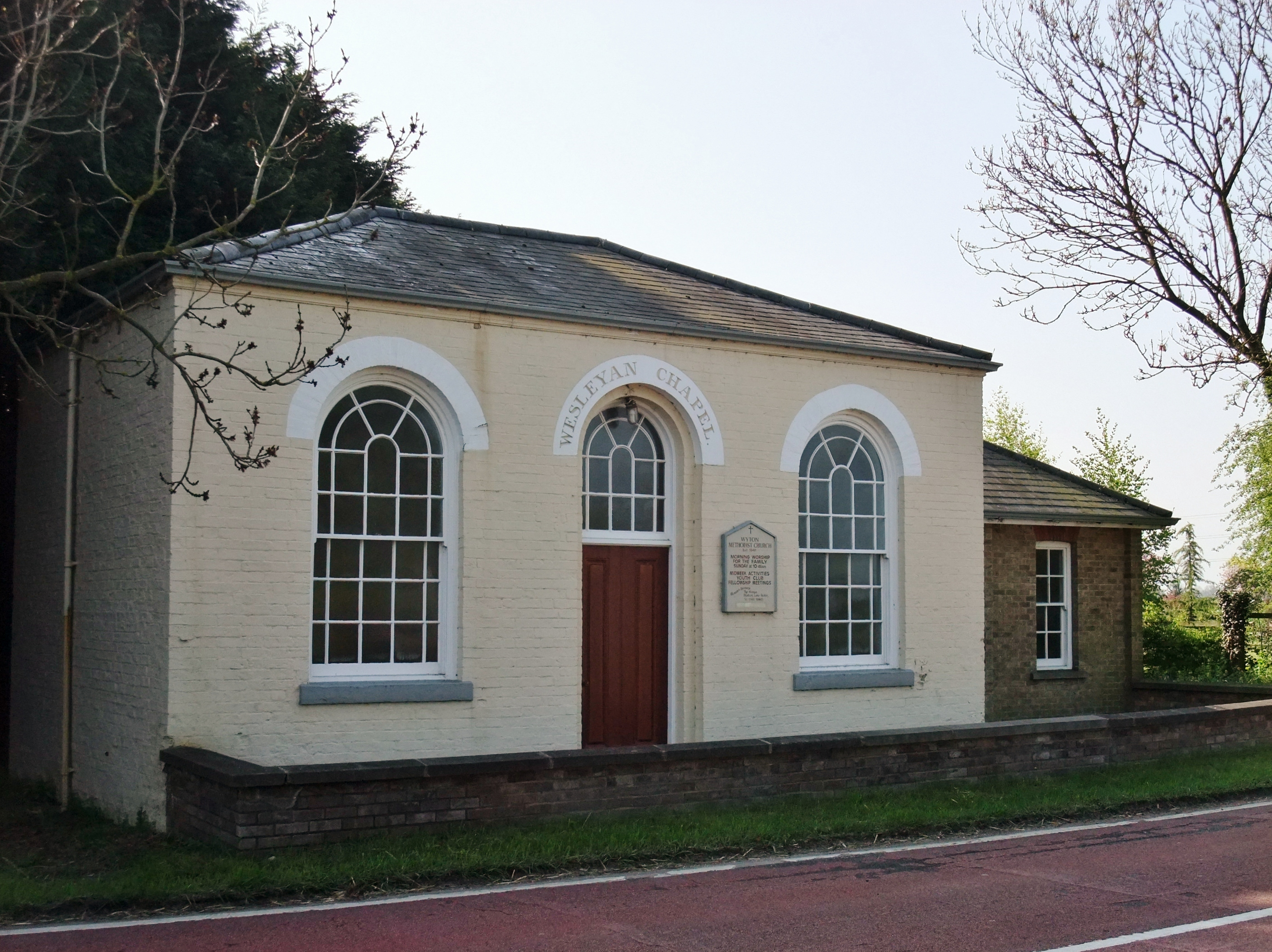
The building, in 2011

Wyton Methodist Church is a Methodist chapel in Wyton, East Riding of Yorkshire, a village in England.

The chapel was built by the Wesleyan Methodist Church in 1841. It had a capacity of 70 worshippers, and by 1851 had an average of 80 attendees each Sunday, across three services. In 1957, it was extended to the rear. The building was grade II listed in 1987. Nikolaus Pevsner described the building as being "as simple as possible".

The chapel is built of colourwashed brick, with an eaves cornice and a hipped slate roof. It has a single storey and is three bays wide. In the centre is a doorway under a round-arched window. This is flanked by full-height round-arched windows, all the openings under round gauged brick arches. The inscription "WESLEYAN CHAPEL" appears on the lintel.

== See also ==
- Listed buildings in Bilton, East Riding of Yorkshire
