= Listed buildings in Shipton, North Yorkshire =

Shipton is a civil parish in the county of North Yorkshire, England. It contains nine listed buildings that are recorded in the National Heritage List for England. All the listed buildings are designated at Grade II, the lowest of the three grades, which is applied to "buildings of national importance and special interest". The parish contains the village of Shipton and the surrounding area. All the listed buildings are in the village, and consist of houses, farmhouses, a public house, a church, a former vicarage, a milepost and a school.

== Buildings ==
Name and location	Photograph	Date	Notes
Dawnay Arms; 54.02108°N 1.15795°W		Early 18th century	A house, later a public house, in pink-red brick on a rendered plinth, with a floor band, stepped eaves, and a pantile roof with tumbled-in gables. There are two storeys, three bays and a rear wing on the left. On the front is a gabled porch, and the windows are sashes.
Hall Farmhouse; 54.02250°N 1.15721°W	—	Mid-18th century	The farmhouse is in red-brown and pinkish brick on a plinth, with a floor band, stepped and dentilled eaves and a stone slate roof. There are two storeys, a double depth plan and five bays. On the front is a stepped gabled porch, and the windows are sashes with gauged brick arches.
School Farmhouse; 54.02120°N 1.15738°W	—	Mid-18th century (probable)	The farmhouse is in red-brown brick on a plinth, with a floor band, an eaves band and a pantile roof. There are two storeys, a double depth plan, and three bays. The central doorway has a fanlight, the windows date from the 20th century, and all the openings have flat gauged brick arches.
The Grange; 54.01972°N 1.15770°W	—	Mid-18th century	The house, later used for other purposes, is in orange-red brick, rendered at the front, with pantile roofs, brick verges and brick kneelers. There are two storeys and three bays, the middle bay projecting, and a three-bay rear wing. On the main front is a glazed portico flanked by canted bay windows. The upper floor contains sash windows in architraves with channelled wedge lintels. The right return has a plinth, a floor band, and a dentilled eaves band and contains sash windows.
Melrose House; 54.02372°N 1.15549°W		1848	Originally a vicarage designed by G. T. Andrews and later used for other purposes, it is in brick on a chamfered plinth, with stone dressings, quoins, oversailing eaves, a stone slate roof, and two storeys. The south front has three bays, the right bay projecting and gabled. The doorway has a pointed arch, a chamfered and quoined surround, a keystone and a hood mould. The windows have quoined surrounds and trefoil heads. In the gale apex is a heraldic shied and a scroll with the date and initials. The left return has three bays, the outer bays gabled. On the left bay is a two-storey canted bay window.
Holy Evangelists' Church; 54.02369°N 1.15689°W		1848–49	The church, designed by G. T. Andrews in Early English style, is in stone with a stone slate roof. It consists of a nave with a clerestory, north and south aisles, a south porch, a chancel with a north vestry, and a northwest steeple. The steeple has a tower with four stages, a northwest stair turret, angle buttresses, string courses, windows with trefoil heads and hood moulds, bell openings with colonnettes, and a broach spire with lucarnes and small quatrefoils. The clerestory windows are also quatrefoils.
Primrose Hill; 54.02306°N 1.15779°W	—	Early 19th century	The house is in red-pink brick on a plinth, and has a pantile roof with shaped stone kneelers and coping. There are two storeys and two bays. In the centre is a doorway with a fanlight, and the windows are sashes with soldier-brick arches.
Milepost; 54.01674°N 1.15699°W		Early to mid-19th century	The milepost is on the east side of the A19 road, and is in cast iron. It has a triangular plan and a sloping top. On the top is the distance to London, on the left side is the distance to York, and on the right side the distance to Easingwold.
School; 54.02157°N 1.15727°W		1850	The school and master's house were designed by G. T. Andrews. They are in brick on a moulded plinth, with stone dressings, quoins and stone slate roofs with coped gables. The house on the left has two storeys and two bays. The doorway has a pointed arch and a quoined and moulded surround, above it is a shouldered arched window, and to the left is a two-storey bay window. The schoolroom forms a gabled cross-wing on the right, and has buttress]es and an eaves band. On the front facing the street is a large canted bay window with a cornice, above which is a clock on a decorative iron bracket, and a quatrefoil in the apex. Along the right return are four bays containing two-light windows with pointed arches, and on the end bay is a porch.
