= Overton, North Yorkshire =

Village and civil parish in North Yorkshire, England

Coordinates: 53.994378°N 1.156567°W

Overton
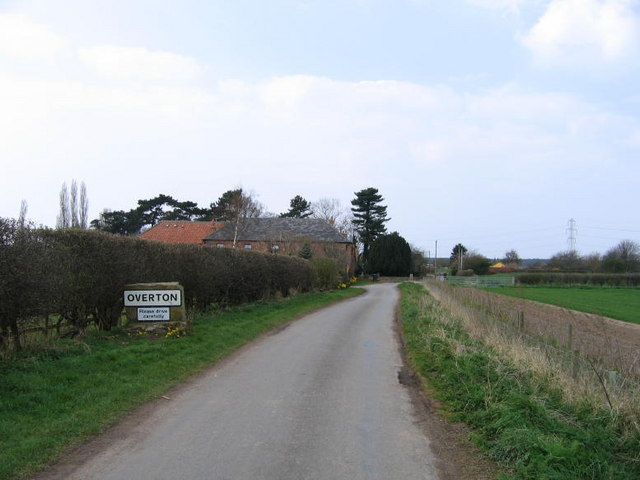
- The Road into Overton

- Location within North Yorkshire
- OS grid reference: SE554557
- Civil parish: Overton
- Unitary authority: North Yorkshire
- Ceremonial county: North Yorkshire
- Region: Yorkshire and the Humber
- Country: England
- Sovereign state: United Kingdom
- Post town: YORK
- Postcode district: YO30
- Police: North Yorkshire
- Fire: North Yorkshire
- Ambulance: Yorkshire
- UK Parliament: Thirsk and Malton

Overton is a small village and civil parish in the county of North Yorkshire, England, about 4 miles (6.4 km) northwest of York. The population of the civil parish taken at the 2011 Census was less than 100. Details are included in the civil parish of Shipton, North Yorkshire.

The East Coast Main Line passes to the east, not far from the village.

== History ==
The name Overton derives from the Old English uferratūn meaning 'higher settlement'.

The village is mentioned three times in the Domesday Book as Ovretun in the Bulford hundred. The manor belonged to Earl Morcar, who had a hall in the village, at the time of the Norman invasion. Some of the land was the possession of the Church of St Peter in York and of Thorbiorn. The manor passed to the Crown and Count Alan of Brittany by 1086. Both granted the manor to St Mary's Abbey, York. The Hall that once stood in the village was the country seat of the Abbots until the dissolution.

The Hall was demolished at some time in the 18th century, though earthworks indicate where the old moat may have been. Eventually the manor and estate came into the hands of the Bourchier, and thence the Dawnay, family at Beningbrough. The parish was once much larger and included the manors of Shipton and Skelton. The remains of the base of a limestone cross are one indication that there was a church in the village at one time. The church was dedicated to St. Cuthbert and built in 1855 to replace a medieval church; however, the church was demolished in the late 1960s and the parish was incorporated into nearby Shipton.

== Geography ==
The nearest settlements are Skelton 1 mile (1.6 km) to the east; Nether Poppleton 0.43 miles (0.69 km) to the south across the River Ouse; Beningbrough 2.3 miles (3.7 km) to the north-west and Shipton 1.9 miles (3.1 km) to the north. It lies on the north bank of the River Ouse.

In 1881 the UK Census recorded the population as 67.

== Governance ==
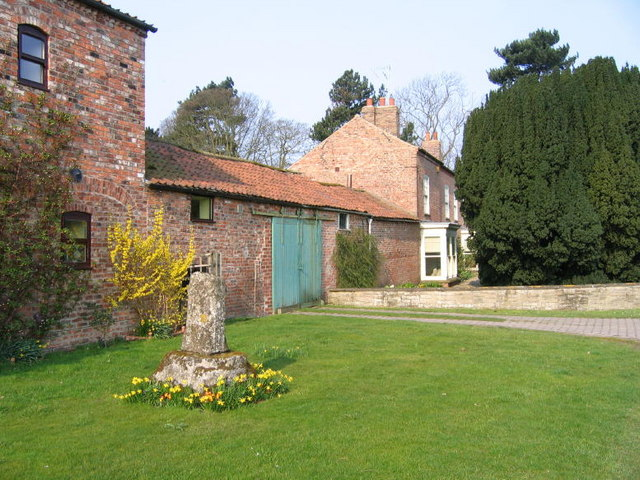
Remains of Cross in Overton

The village lies within the Thirsk and Malton Parliamentary constituency. From 1974 to 2023 it was part of the Hambleton District, it is now administered by the unitary North Yorkshire Council.

== See also ==
- Listed buildings in Overton, North Yorkshire
