= Old School, Newton-on-Ouse =

Building in Newton-on-Ouse, North Yorkshire, England

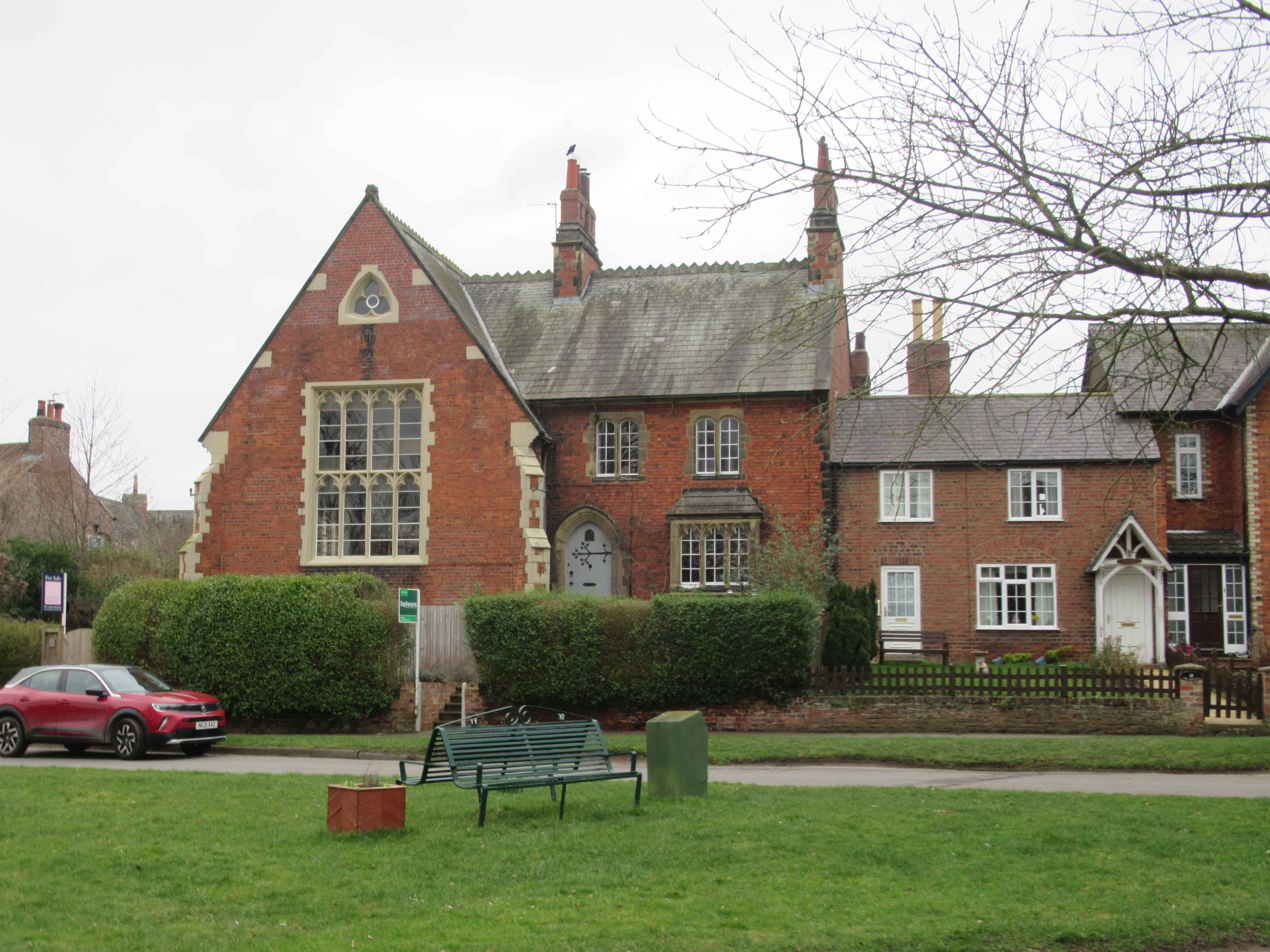
The building, in 2023

The Old School is a historic building in Newton-on-Ouse, a village in North Yorkshire, in England.

The village school and attached schoolmaster's house was built in 1854, to a design by George Townsend Andrews. By 1941, its enrollment had grown to 90 pupils, and a prefabricated extension was constructed. After the war, enrollment fell until in 1986 it had only 7 pupils, and it was closed. The building was grade II listed that year. It remained in the ownership of the parish council but disused until 2018, when it was sold and converted into a house.

The building is constructed of red brick on a plinth, with stone dressings, quoins, and roofs in Welsh and green slate, with stone coping and ridge cresting. The former school has one gabled bay and buttresses, it contains a large mullioned and transomed window with cusped lights, and above it is a cusped spherical triangle and on the apex is a fleur-de-lis finial. The house has two storeys and two bays. On the left is a doorway with a pointed arch and a moulded surround and decorative hinges. To the right is a bay window, and on the upper floor are windows with two round-headed lights.

== See also ==
- Listed buildings in Newton-on-Ouse
