= Listed buildings in Beningbrough =

Beningbrough is a civil parish in the county of North Yorkshire, England. It contains twelve listed buildings that are recorded in the National Heritage List for England. Of these, one is listed at Grade I, the highest of the three grades, and the others are at Grade II, the lowest grade. The most important building in the parish is Beningbrough Hall, which is listed at Grade I. All the other listed buildings are associated with the hall, and are either in close proximity to it, or in its grounds. These include a stable block, a former brew house and a laundry, a ha-ha, farm buildings, a pump house, and various walls and gates.

== Key ==
Grade	Criteria
I	Buildings of exceptional interest, sometimes considered to be internationally important
II	Buildings of national importance and special interest

== Buildings ==
Name and location	Photograph	Date	Notes	Grade
Beningbrough Hall; 54.02052°N 1.21351°W		1716	A country house in red brick with stone dressings, quoin strips, floor bands, paired console brackets, a deep moulded cornice and blocking course, and a hipped Westmorland slate roof. There are two storeys, a basement and attics, a double pile plan, fronts of eleven and five bays, and screen walls linking to pavilions. On the main front, the middle three bays project, and in the centre steps with an iron balustrade lead up to a doorway with an architrave, Doric pilasters, and an entablature with a cornice, over which is a decorated cartouche. The windows are sashes with gauged brick arches. The screen walls contain niches and balustrades. The pavilions have two storeys and fronts of a single bay, and each contains angle pilasters, round arches with imposts and keystones, flat-arched windows, and a dentilled cornice. On the roof is a cupola with an ogee lead roof and a ball and spire finial; the left pavilion has a bell, and the right pavilion has a wind clock. At the rear, the central doorway has channelled quoins, attached Ionic columns, a frieze and a cornice, above which is a cartouche and a segmental pediment.	I
Ha-ha, Beningbrough Hall; 54.01930°N 1.21071°W		18th century	The ha-ha, which has subsequently been repaired, is in red brick. It sweeps round from the northeast corner of the hall buildings and along the south front, with a projecting curve in front of the hall. Towards the west end are steps leading up to a terrace flanked by a coped wall.	II
Stable block, Beningbrough Hall; 54.02078°N 1.21076°W		18th century	The stable block is in brick, with stone dressings, floor bands, stepped eaves, and hipped Westmorland slate roofs. There are two storeys and a U-shaped plan, with a main range of seven bays, and side wings of three bays. The middle three bays of the main range project under a pediment containing an oeil-de-boeuf in the tympanum. In the ground floor is an arcade of three round arches with imposts, above which are three windows and a cornice on paired brackets, and on the roof is a cast iron wind vane. The outer bays contain round-arched doorways with fanlights and windows, and in the upper floor are sash windows with segmental heads. The wings contain segmental-headed carriage entrances.	II
The Brew House, Beningbrough Hall; 54.02065°N 1.21456°W	—	Mid 18th century	The former brew house is in orange brick with a hipped Welsh slate roof. There are two storeys and three bays. It contains a central doorway flanked by sash windows, and all the openings have cambered gauged brick arches.	II
Wall around the laundry and the brew house yard 54.02076°N 1.21422°W	—	Mid 18th century	The wall is in orange brick with stone coping. It has broad buttresses, two entrances, and is ramped down to the right of the laundry house.	II
Garden walls, Beningbrough Hall; 54.02050°N 1.21216°W		Mid to late 18th century	The walls are in orange brick with stone coping, and the entrances have iron gates and sandstone lintels. The north wall was designed to be heated, and has lean-to sheds with segmental-headed windows, stepped dentilled eaves and hipped roofs.	II
The Laundry House, Beningbrough Hall; 54.02078°N 1.21444°W		Early 19th century	The laundry house with accommodation above is in brown brick with a hipped Welsh slate roof. There are two storeys and four bays. It contains a doorway and sash windows, all with cambered brick arches.	II
Cartshed and granary, Home Farm; 54.02095°N 1.20927°W	—	Mid to late 19th century	The building is in red brick, with stone dressings, a stepped dentilled eaves cornice, and a Westmorland slate roof. There are two storeys and four bays. The bays are flanked by corniced pilasters, and in the ground floor are segmental-headed arches over cart doors and windows. The upper floor contains a door, and sash windows with flat brick arches. On the sides, the gables are treated as pediments.	II
Covered yard, Home Farm; 54.02097°N 1.20903°W	—	Mid to late 19th century	The covered yard, which incorporates an earlier building, is in red brick with a roof of Welsh slate and corrugated asbestos. The north front has three gabled bays, with panelled pilasters and round-arched panels. These contain round-arched doorways, oculi in the apices, and decorative crosses in black brick. The eastern front also has three gabled bays.	II
Pump house, Beningbrough Hall; 54.01882°N 1.21793°W		Late 19th to early 20th century	The pump house is in orange, pink and white brick, with stone dressings, clasping buttresses, a stepped and dentilled cornice, and a corbelled embattled parapet. There are three stages, with pilasters in the middle stage, and a square plan with an outshut on the west. On the east front is a doorway with a cambered head, and the west front has a doorway with an elliptical head. The windows in the top two stages are narrow with chamfered lintels.	II
Skating pond lining and tank, Beningbrough Hall; 54.02214°N 1.21419°W	—	c. 1900	The pond has a shallow lining in stone, with an iron grille over a drain, and it has the irregular shape of a gourd with square ends. Outside the pond next to the drain is a stone slab covering a tank.	II
Wall and gates north of Beningbrough Hall; 54.02094°N 1.21340°W		c. 1900	The low wall is in red brick, on a plinth with moulded stone coping, and has flat buttresses, and flat stone coping. At the corners are two gadrooned stone urns. The double gates are in wrought iron, they are decorative, and have a ramped top with scrolls and foliated terminals. Flanking the gates, the walls are curved and have wrought iron railings with similar decoration.	II
