= Dawnay Arms, Shipton =

Pub in Shipton, North Yorkshire, England

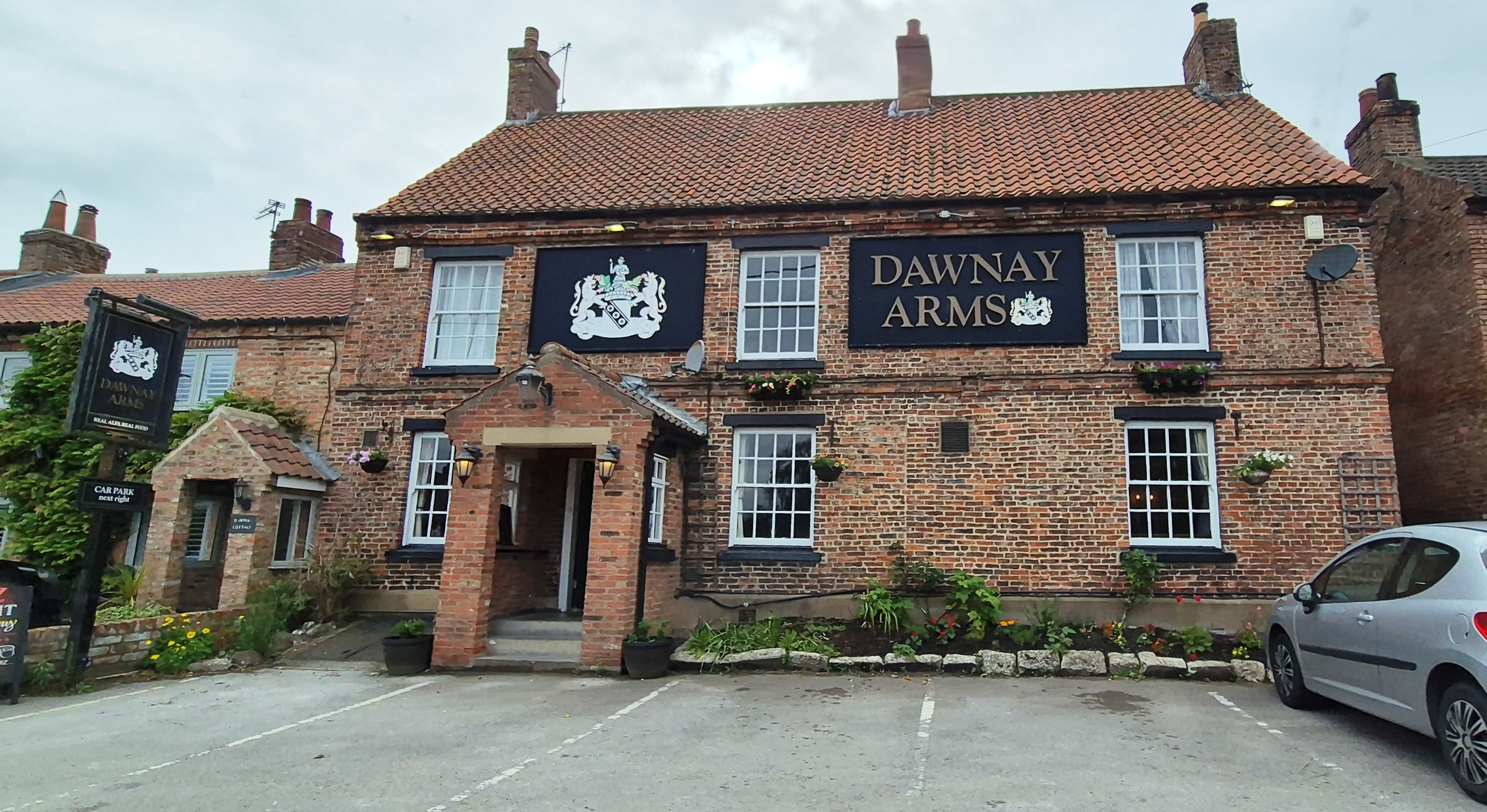
The pub, in 2024

The Dawnay Arms is a historic pub in Shipton-by-Beningbrough, a village in North Yorkshire, in England.

The building was constructed in about 1730 as a house, later being converted into a pub. It was extended in the 20th century. It lies on the A19 road, and as of 2015 served a variety of food and beers. In 2025, it was registered as an asset of community value, at which time, it hosted live music, charity events, various clubs, and annual beer and music festivals. However, later in the year, it cut its opening times to three days per week. The building has been grade II listed since 1986.

The building is constructed of pink-red brick on a rendered plinth, with a floor band, stepped eaves, and a pantile roof with tumbled-in gables. It has two storeys, three bays and a rear wing on the left. On the front is a gabled porch, and the windows are sashes.

== See also ==
- Listed buildings in Shipton, North Yorkshire
