= All Saints' Church, Newton-on-Ouse =

Church in Newton-on-Ouse, North Yorkshire, England

Coordinates: 54°01′58″N 1°13′17″W

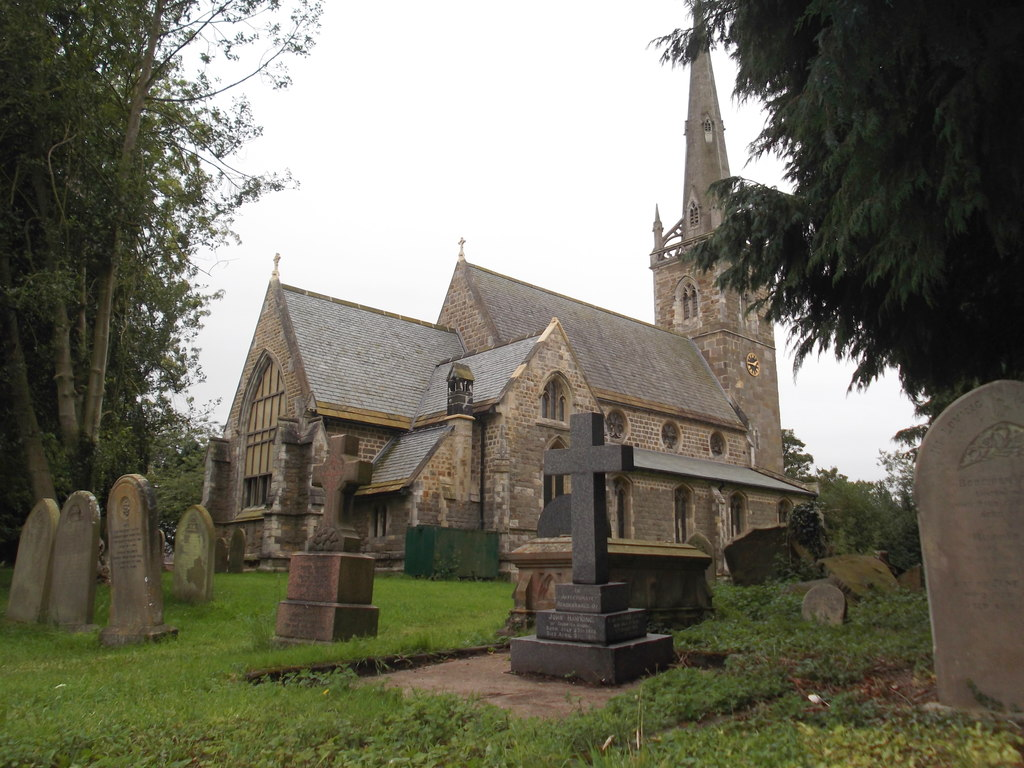
The church, in 2020

All Saints' Church is the parish church of Newton-on-Ouse, a village in North Yorkshire, in England.

The oldest parts of the church is the lower stage of the tower, including the tower arch, which was built in the early 12th century. The remainder of the church was partly rebuilt in 1839, and then entirely rebuilt in 1849, to a design by George Townsend Andrews. The southwest window of the chancel retains stained glass installed in 1827. The building was grade II listed in 1960.

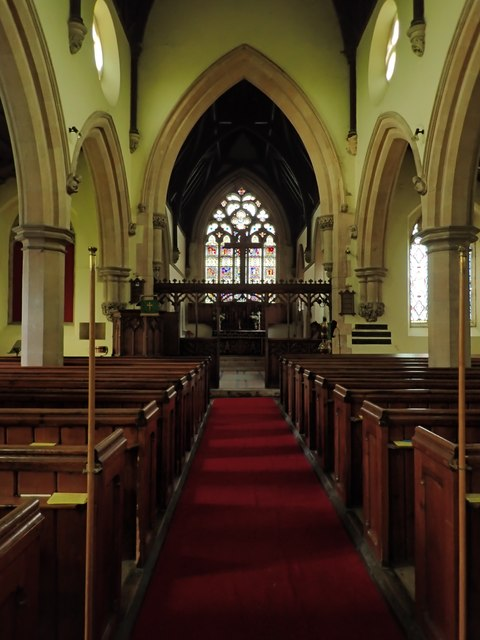
View from the nave into the chancel

The church is built of rusticated stone, the tower is in sandstone, the spire is in limestone, and the roofs are in stone slate. The church consists of a nave with a clerestory, north and south aisles, a south porch, a chancel with a north vestry, and a west steeple. The steeple has a tower with two stages, and contains slit windows in the lower stage, a west window with a pointed arch, and clock faces. In the upper stages is a band, two-light bell openings, a coved eaves band, gargoyles, an openwork parapet with corner pinnacles, and a recessed spire with thin flying buttresses, lucarnes and a weathervane.

== See also ==
- Listed buildings in Newton-on-Ouse
