= Listed buildings in Overton, North Yorkshire =

Overton is a civil parish in the county of North Yorkshire, England. It contains two listed buildings that are recorded in the National Heritage List for England. Both the listed buildings are designated at Grade II, the lowest of the three grades, which is applied to "buildings of national importance and special interest". The parish contains the village of Overton and the surrounding area. Both the listed buildings are in the village, and consist of the remains of a cross, and a farmhouse.

== Buildings ==
Name and location	Photograph	Date	Notes
Overton Cross; 53.99450°N 1.15422°W		15th century (probable)	The cross is in limestone. It has a square base becoming octagonal, with chamfered corners. On it is the stump of a cross, with a square section and a pyramidal-stopped chamfer to corners at the bottom, each chamfer with a saltire cross at its top.
Moat House; 53.99507°N 1.15776°W	—	Mid to late 18th century	The farmhouse, on a moated site, is in mottled pink-brown brick and limestone blocks, with a Welsh slate roof, hipped on the right, and with tumbled-in gables elsewhere. There are two storeys, a front range of three bays, a rear range and a rear wing. The doorway has a fanlight and a cornice, it is flanked by bow windows, and the upper floor contains sash windows. To the left is a single-storey bay with a pantile roof.
