= Ganstead =

Village in the East Riding of Yorkshire, England

Coordinates: 53.790648°N 0.258609°W

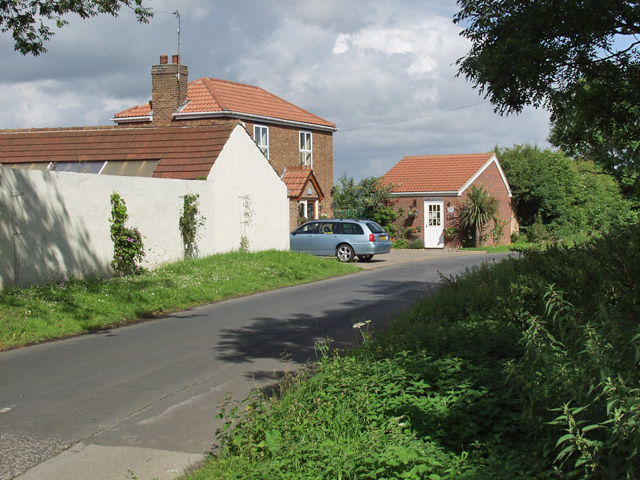
- Swine Lane, Ganstead West

- Location within the East Riding of Yorkshire
- OS grid reference: TA148341
  - London: 160 mi (260 km) S
- Civil parish: Bilton
- Unitary authority: East Riding of Yorkshire
- Ceremonial county: East Riding of Yorkshire
- Region: Yorkshire and the Humber
- Country: England
- Sovereign state: United Kingdom
- Post town: HULL
- Postcode district: HU11
- Dialling code: 01482
- Police: Humberside
- Fire: Humberside
- Ambulance: Yorkshire
- UK Parliament: Beverley and Holderness

Ganstead is a village in the civil parish of Bilton, in the East Riding of Yorkshire, England, in an area known as Holderness. It is situated approximately 5 miles (8 km) north-east of Kingston upon Hull city centre. It is divided into Ganstead East and Ganstead West by the A165 road which passes through the village.

Ganstead was formerly a township in the parish of Swine, in 1866 Ganstead became a civil parish, on 1 April 1935 the parish was abolished and merged with Bilton. In 1931 the parish had a population of 105.

In 1823 Ganstead was in the parish of Swine and in the Wapentake and Liberty of Holderness. Population at the time was 61 and included four farmers and a corn miller.

The name Ganstead derives from the Old Norse Gagnistaðr meaning 'Gagni's place'.
