= Newton-on-Ouse =

Village and civil parish in North Yorkshire, England

Coordinates: 54°01′58″N 1°13′12″W

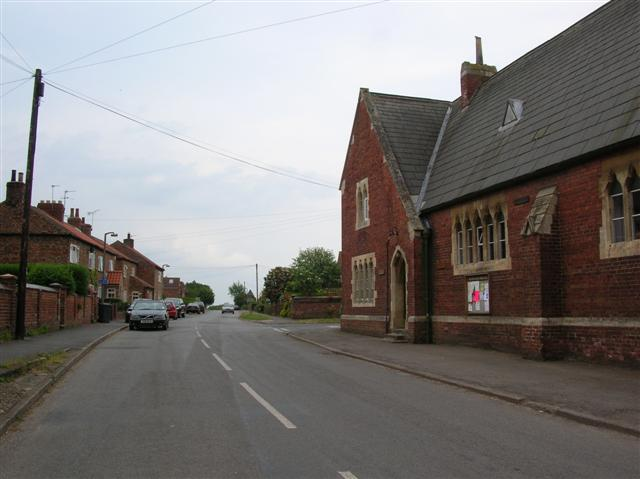
- Newton upon Ouse

- Location within North Yorkshire
- Population: 599 (2011 census)
- OS grid reference: SE512600
- Civil parish: Newton-on-Ouse
- Unitary authority: North Yorkshire
- Ceremonial county: North Yorkshire
- Region: Yorkshire and the Humber
- Country: England
- Sovereign state: United Kingdom
- Post town: YORK
- Postcode district: YO30
- Police: North Yorkshire
- Fire: North Yorkshire
- Ambulance: Yorkshire
- UK Parliament: Wetherby and Easingwold

Newton-on-Ouse is a village and civil parish in the county of North Yorkshire, England, about 7 miles (11 km) north-west of York. It lies on the east bank of the River Ouse

== History ==
The village is mentioned in the Domesday Book as Neuuetone in the Bulford hundred. At the time of the Norman invasion the manor was held by Merleswein the Sheriff and then granted to Ralph Paynel. He founded St Martin's Abbey in Touraine in France and granted some of the land in the parish to the abbey.

The village once had a school built in 1854 in Cherry Tree Avenue.

== Governance ==
The village lies within the Thirsk and Malton Parliamentary constituency. From 1974 to 2023 it was part of the Hambleton District, it is now administered by the unitary North Yorkshire Council.

== Geography ==
The nearest settlements to the village are Linton-on-Ouse 1.2 miles (1.9 km) to the north-west, Nun Monkton 1.3 miles (2.1 km) to the south and Beningbrough 1.6 miles (2.6 km) to the south-east. The River Kyle forms the boundary between the parishes of Linton-on-Ouse and Newton-on-Ouse and joins the River Ouse at the north end of the village.

The 1881 UK census recorded the population as 592. The 2001 UK census recorded the population as 529, of whom 431 were over the age of sixteen years and 269 of those were in employment. There were 242 dwellings, of which 11 were detached.

== Religion ==
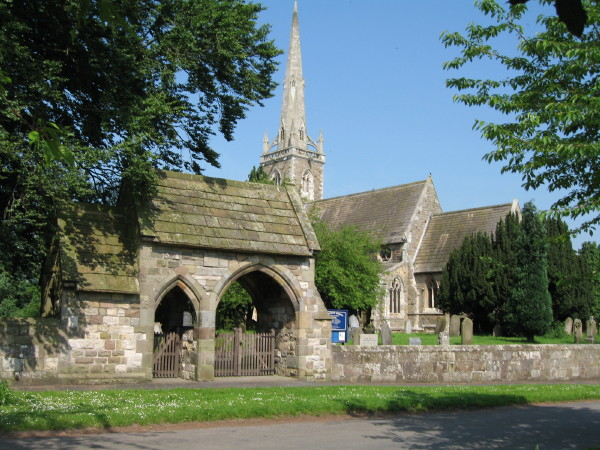
All Saints Church Newton-on-Ouse

There has been a church in Newton since Saxon times. Originally dedicated to All Saints, it was known as St Mary's around 1848–1890 before reverting to All Saints' Church. The current Grade II listed building dates from 1849, although the tower is approximately 900 years old. The church was rebuilt twice in the 19th century, first in 1839 and then again in 1849. Both rebuilds were financed by the Dawnay family who resided at nearby Beningbrough Hall. John Oates was commissioned by the 6th Viscount Downe, William Henry Dawnay, to rebuild the body of the church and this was completed in 1839. Just ten years later Dawnay's daughter, the Hon. Lydia Dawnay, commissioned George Townsend Andrews to rebuild the church and it was at this stage that the magnificent spire, 150 ft from the ground, was added. William Dawnay, 6th Viscount Downe, and his wife are interred in the church with the fine memorial brass that once covered the tomb now fixed to the chancel wall. As of 2015, the Priest-in-Charge was Rev. Malcolm Wainwright.

There used to be a Methodist chapel in the village.

== See also ==
- Listed buildings in Newton-on-Ouse
