= Shipton, North Yorkshire =

Village and civil parish in North Yorkshire, England

Coordinates: 54°01′18″N 1°09′28″W

Shipton
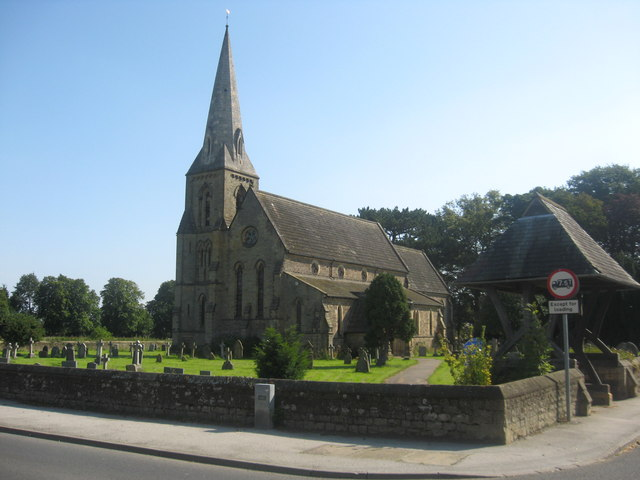
- Holy Evangelists' Church

- Location within North Yorkshire
- Population: 843 (Including Beninbrough and Overton. 2021 census)
- OS grid reference: SE552587
- Civil parish: Shipton
- Unitary authority: North Yorkshire
- Ceremonial county: North Yorkshire
- Region: Yorkshire and the Humber
- Country: England
- Sovereign state: United Kingdom
- Post town: YORK
- Postcode district: YO30
- Police: North Yorkshire
- Fire: North Yorkshire
- Ambulance: Yorkshire
- UK Parliament: Wetherby and Easingwold

Shipton (also known as Shipton-by-Beningbrough) is a village and civil parish in the county of North Yorkshire, England, about 5 miles (8 km) north-west of York.

== History ==
The village was in existence at the time of the Norman invasion, as shown in the OpenDomesday on-line. In the 11th century it was known as Hipton from the Old English words heope and -tun, meaning Rose-hip settlement. Land in the area was held by Count Alan of Brittany around 1086 and by Richard de Camera. Various landowners over the next 150 years gave land to nearby St Mary's Abbey. After the dissolution, John Shipton had leased the manor which John Redman eventually bought from the Crown outright in 1557. By 1625 the manor had passed to William Scudamore of Overton, who eventually sold it the Bouchier family of nearby Beningbrough Hall and thence through succession to the Dawnay family.

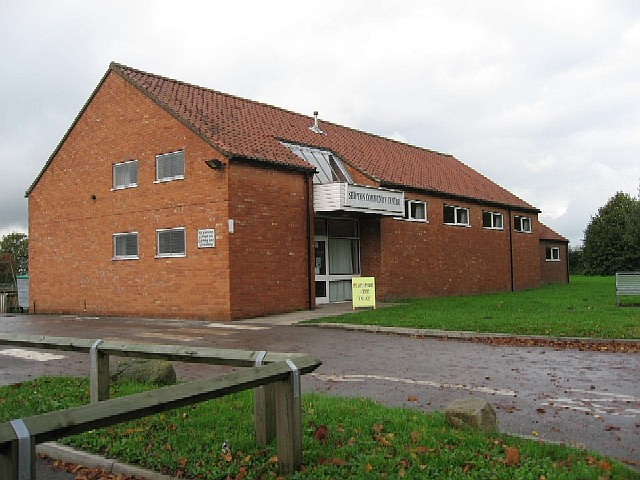
Community Centre

In 1405 the Battle of Shipton Moor was fought as part of an unsuccessful rebellion against the rule of Henry IV.

In 1655, Ann Middleton, a Yorkshire philanthropist and wife of the Sheriff of York, left £1,000 to build a grammar school in the village. She also left 20 shillings a year to the poor of Shipton. The grammar school stood until 1850, when the Lord of the Manor, the Hon. Payan Dawnay, knocked it down, and built a new one.

The village public house was once known as The Bay Horse, and was originally built in 1730. It became the Dawnay Arms in Payan's lifetime and shows the family coat of arms over the door. It is a Grade II Listed building.

Land to the north of the village was used as an airfield (RAF Shipton) during the First World War. In the Second World War it was the base of a crashed aircraft recovery unit and then the site was used between 1953 and 1993 as a location for a government command and control bunker.

On the west side of the village lies the now abandoned Beningbrough railway station which opened in 1841 by the Great North of England Railway on the now East Coast Main Line first known as Shipton until 1898 it closed to passengers in 1958, and then to all traffic in 1965.

== Governance ==
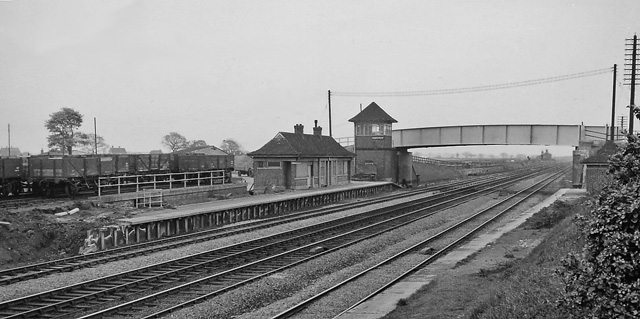
Beningbrough Railway Station

The village lies within the Wetherby & Easingwold Constituency. From 1974 to 2023 it was part of the Hambleton District, it is now administered by the unitary North Yorkshire Council.

=== Police ===
Shipton falls within the North Yorkshire Police area.

== Geography ==
The village lies on what was once the Great North Road, but is now the A19. The nearest settlements are Wigginton 3 miles (4.8 km) to the east; Skelton 1.8 miles (2.9 km) to the south east and Beningbrough 1.5 miles (2.4 km) to the west. This ward had a population at the 2011 Census of 2,672. The 1881 UK Census recorded the population as 430. The 2001 UK Census recorded the population as 691, of which 525 were over the age of sixteen years and 311 of those were in employment. There were 272 dwellings, of which 126 were detached.

== Religion ==
Holy Evangelists' Church, Shipton was built in 1849 by the Dawnay family and is a Grade II Listed building. There used to be a Wesleyan chapel in the village.

== See also ==
- Listed buildings in Shipton, North Yorkshire
