= Bilton, East Riding of Yorkshire =

Village and civil parish in the East Riding of Yorkshire, England

Coordinates: 53.7806°N 0.2385°W

Bilton
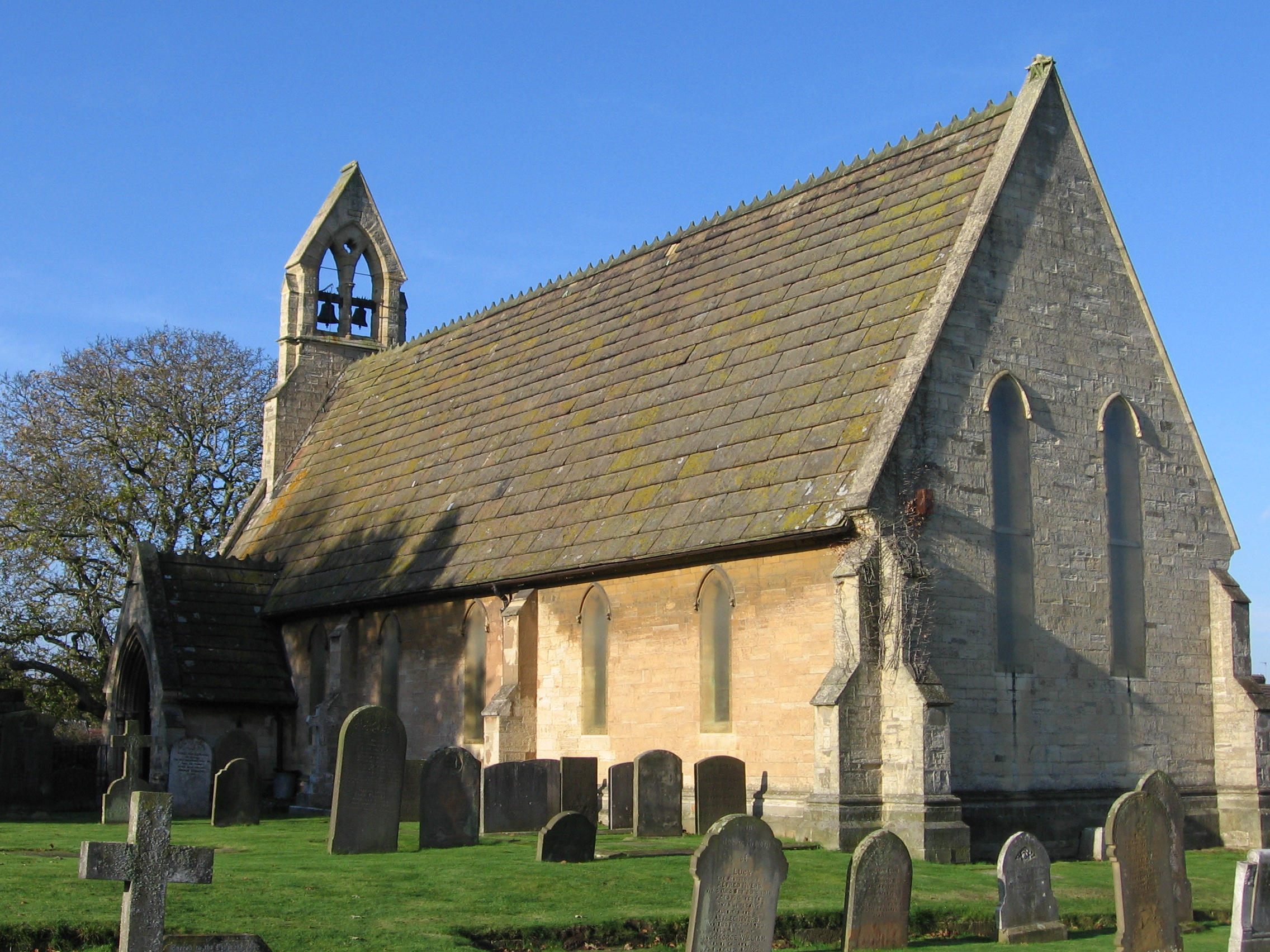
- St Peter's Church, Bilton

- Location within the East Riding of Yorkshire
- Population: 2,220 (2011 census)
- OS grid reference: TA160330
  - London: 155 mi (249 km) S
- Civil parish: Bilton
- Unitary authority: East Riding of Yorkshire
- Ceremonial county: East Riding of Yorkshire
- Region: Yorkshire and the Humber
- Country: England
- Sovereign state: United Kingdom
- Post town: HULL
- Postcode district: HU11
- Dialling code: 01482
- Police: Humberside
- Fire: Humberside
- Ambulance: Yorkshire
- UK Parliament: Beverley and Holderness

Bilton (or Bilton-in-Holderness) is a village and civil parish in the East Riding of Yorkshire, England. It is situated approximately 5 miles (8 km) east of Hull city centre on the B1238 road and adjoining the village of Wyton. According to the 2011 UK census, Bilton parish had a population of 2,220, a decrease on the 2001 UK census figure of 2,340.

The civil parish of Bilton consists of the villages of Bilton, Ganstead and Wyton.

The name Bilton derives from the Old English Billtūn or Billatūn meaning 'Bill's' or 'Billa's settlement'.

St Peter's Church is a Grade II listed building that was designed by G. T. Andrews and built in 1851.

Bilton Community Primary School is situated in Bilton and provides primary education for about 300 pupils from the village and the surrounding area.

A 131-acre (53 ha) site is to be used to construct the biggest solar farm in the UK since 2016. The farm is to be built by Gridserve on behalf of Warrington Borough Council.

== See also ==
- Listed buildings in Bilton, East Riding of Yorkshire
