= Beningbrough =

Village and civil parish in North Yorkshire, England

Coordinates: 54.013013°N 1.193697°W

- Location within North Yorkshire
- OS grid reference: SE529577
  - London: 175 mi (282 km) SSE
- Civil parish: Beningbrough
- Unitary authority: North Yorkshire
- Ceremonial county: North Yorkshire
- Region: Yorkshire and the Humber
- Country: England
- Sovereign state: United Kingdom
- Post town: YORK
- Postcode district: YO30
- Police: North Yorkshire
- Fire: North Yorkshire
- Ambulance: Yorkshire

Beningbrough is a village and civil parish in the county of North Yorkshire, England. The population as taken at the 2011 Census was less than 100. Details are included in the civil parish of Shipton, North Yorkshire.

Beningbrough village is 6 miles (10 km) north-west from York city centre. The parish, which includes Beningbrough Hall and Park, is bordered at the south-west by the River Ouse, historically the border between the North Riding and West Riding of Yorkshire. According to the 2001 Census, parish population was 55.

Beningbrough is within the ecclesiastical parish of Shipton with Overton. The parish church of Holy Evangelists is at Shipton by Beningbrough.

Beningbrough is listed in the 1086 Domesday Book as "Benniburg", meaning a "stronghold associated with a man called 'Beonna'", being an Old English person name. At the time of the Norman Conquest, Beningbrough was in the Bulford Hundred of the North Riding of Yorkshire. The settlement contained five households and five villagers, with one-and-a-half ploughlands, three furlongs of woodland, and six acres of meadow. In 1066, Asfrith was lord, this transferred to Ralph in 1086, with Hugh fitzBaldric becoming tenant-in-chief to king William I.

In 1870 Beningbrough was a township in the parish of Newton-on-Ouse, containing 88 people in 15 houses within an area of 1,070 acres (4.3 km^{2}), and in 1877, 74 people in 1,092 acres (4.4 km^{2}). From 1974 to 2023 it was part of the Hambleton District, it is now administered by the unitary North Yorkshire Council.

Beningbrough railway station was the first station out of York on the main line to Newcastle. The station opened on the GNER line in 1841; closed to passengers in 1958, and to freight in 1965.

The racehorse Beningbrough, winner of the 1794 St Leger Stakes, was named after the village.

== See also ==
- Listed buildings in Beningbrough
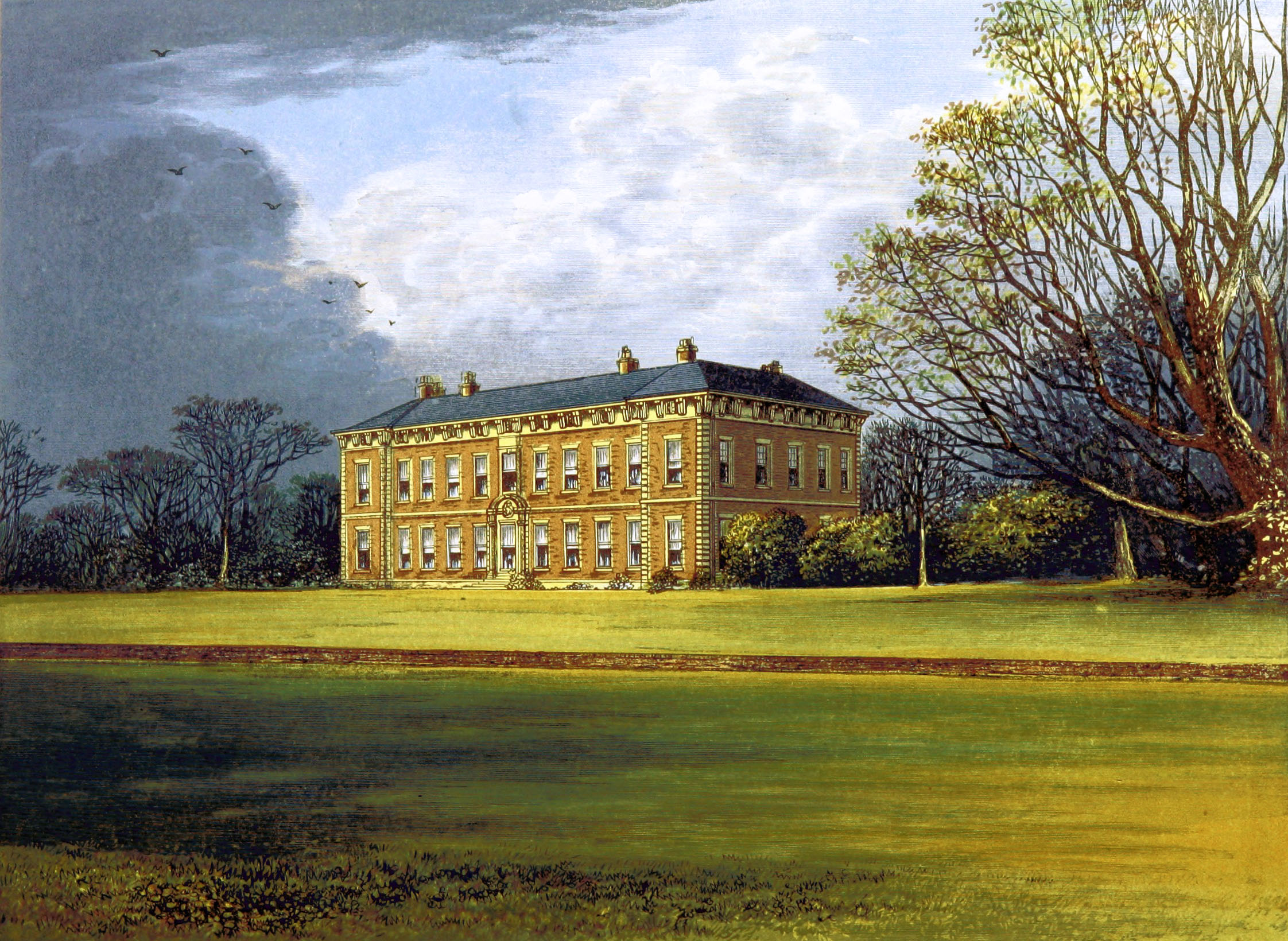
Beningbrough Hall, from Morris's Country Seats (1880)

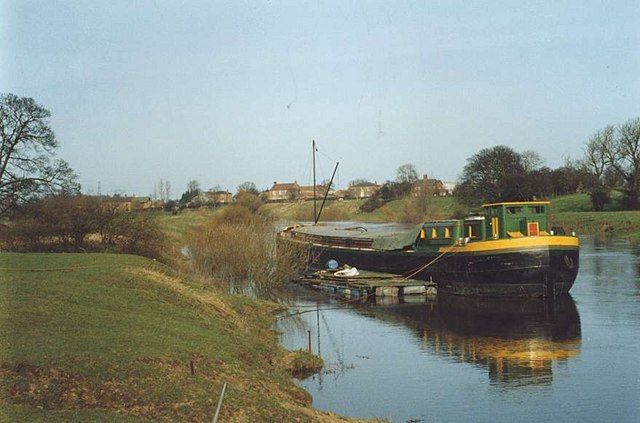
River Ouse at Beningbrough

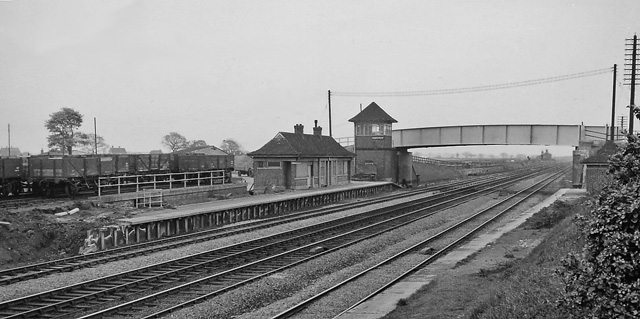
Beningbrough railway station in 1961
