= Wyton, East Riding of Yorkshire =

Hamlet in the East Riding of Yorkshire, England

Coordinates: 53.782544°N 0.214852°W

Wyton
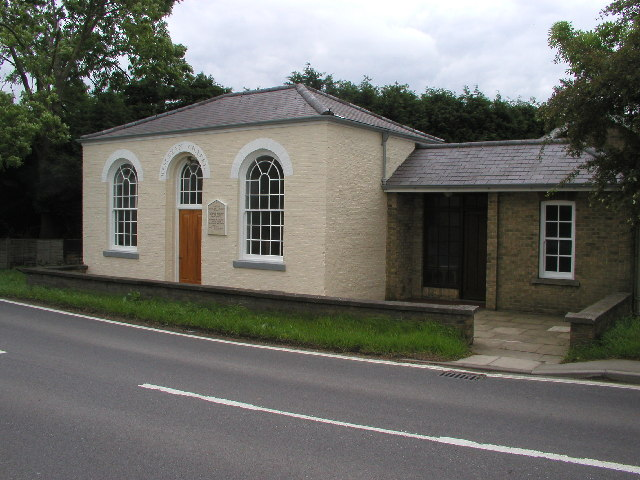
- The Methodist chapel in Wyton

- Location within the East Riding of Yorkshire
- OS grid reference: TA177332
- Civil parish: Bilton
- Unitary authority: East Riding of Yorkshire
- Ceremonial county: East Riding of Yorkshire
- Region: Yorkshire and the Humber
- Country: England
- Sovereign state: United Kingdom
- Post town: HULL
- Postcode district: HU11
- Dialling code: 01482
- Police: Humberside
- Fire: Humberside
- Ambulance: Yorkshire
- UK Parliament: Beverley and Holderness

Wyton is a hamlet in the civil parish of Bilton, in the East Riding of Yorkshire, It is situated approximately 6 miles (9.7 km) east of Kingston upon Hull city centre. Wyton leads from Bilton through to Sproatley.

Wyton was formerly a township in the parish of Swine, in 1866 Wyton became a separate civil parish, on 1 April 1935 the parish was abolished and merged with Bilton. In 1931 the parish had a population of 111.

The name Wyton possibly derives from the Old English wīftūn meaning 'woman's settlement'. Alternatively, the first element could derive from the Old English personal name Wifa/Wife. Another suggestion is that it derives from wīðigtūn meaning 'settlement by the willow'.

Wyton is a small farming village with few houses, it is used for farming because of its rich soil, and large, open space. Its history is small, but was a Quaker village in the 17th century. There are still signs of the Quakers, such as buried ploughing machines, buried clothes and the remains of the houses (more on the Sproatley track, leading from Sproatley to Coniston). Wyton contains a Grade II listed Wesleyan Methodist Church, a milestone and a hall but there are no schools, public houses, post offices, hotels, public telephones or sports centres. Wyton is usually called a hamlet because it is even smaller than a village.
