= Beningbrough Hall =

Listed building in North Yorkshire, England

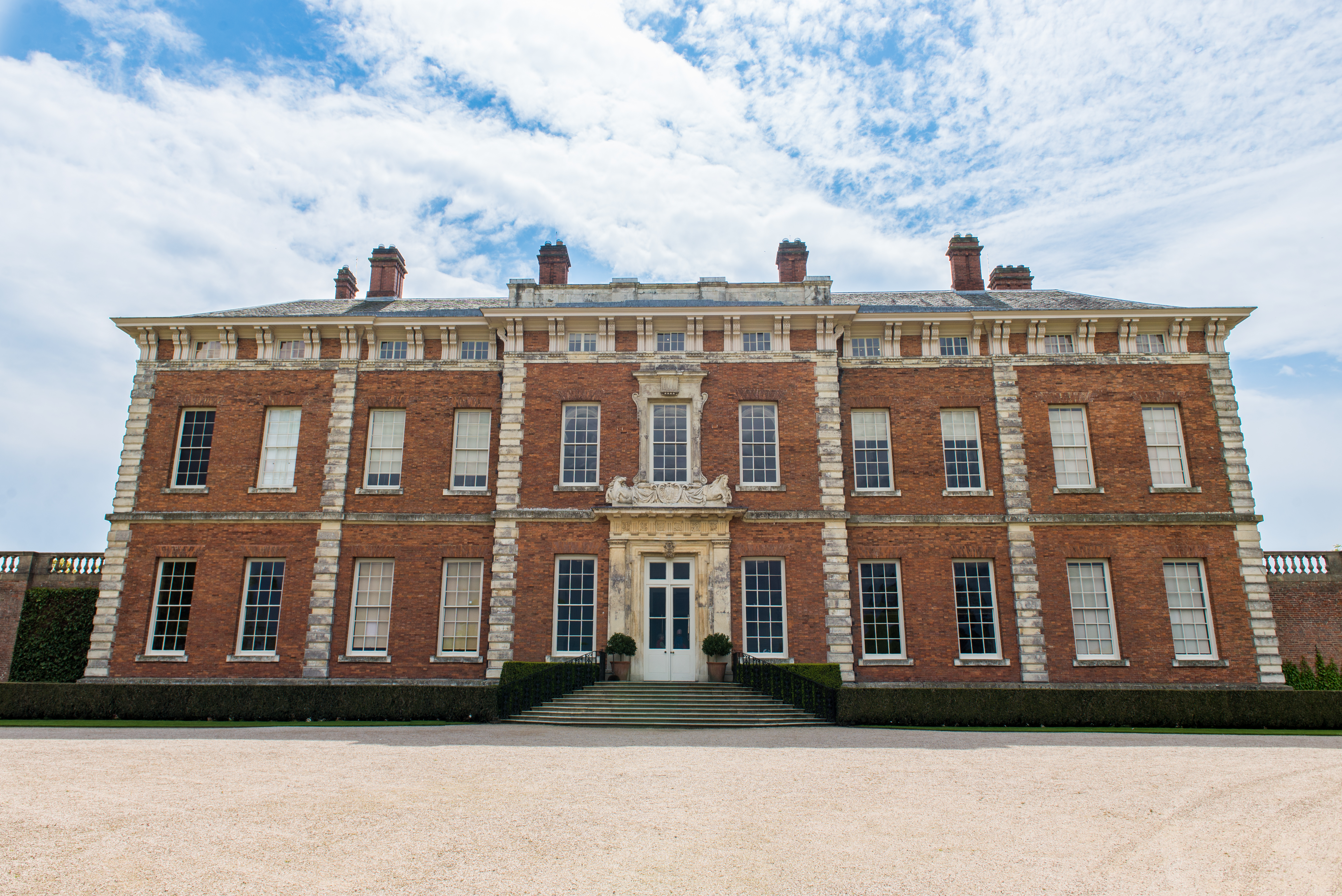
- Front facade of Beningbrough Hall

- Location of Beningbrough Hall in North Yorkshire
- 54.02070°N 1.21060°W
- Type: Country house
- Location: Beningbrough, North Yorkshire

History
- Built: 1716
- Built for: John Bourchier III
- Original use: Private home

Site notes
- Architect: William Thornton
- Architectural style: Baroque
- Current use: Museum
- Owner: National Trust
- Website: nationaltrust.org.uk/beningbrough-hall-gallery-and-gardens

Listed Building – Grade I
- Official name: Beningbrough Hall
- Designated: 28 February 1952
- Reference no.: 1150998

National Register of Historic Parks and Gardens
- Official name: Beningbrough Hall
- Designated: 10 May 1984
- Reference no.: 1001057

Beningbrough Hall is a large Baroque mansion near the village of Beningbrough, North Yorkshire, England, and overlooks the River Ouse.

It has baroque interiors, cantilevered stairs, wood carving and central corridors which run the length of the house. Externally the house is a red-brick Baroque mansion with a grand drive running to the main frontage and a walled garden, The house is home to changing exhibitions on the first floor art gallery and stories of the estate on the ground floor. It has a restaurant, shop and garden shop, and was shortlisted in 2010 for the Guardian Family Friendly Museum Award.

The hall is set in extensive grounds and is separated from them by a ha-ha (a sunken wall) to prevent sheep and cattle entering the estate's gardens or the hall itself. The gardens are undergoing a redesign by garden designer Andy Sturgeon.

== History ==
Beningbrough Hall, situated 6.2 miles (10 km) north-west of York, was built in 1716 by a York landowner, John Bourchier III to replace his family's modest Elizabethan manor, which had been built in 1556 by Sir Ralph Bourchier on his inheritance to the estate. Local builder William Thornton oversaw the construction, but Beningbrough's designer remains a mystery; possibly it was Thomas Archer. Bourchier was High Sheriff of Yorkshire for 1719–1721 and died in 1736 at the age of 52.

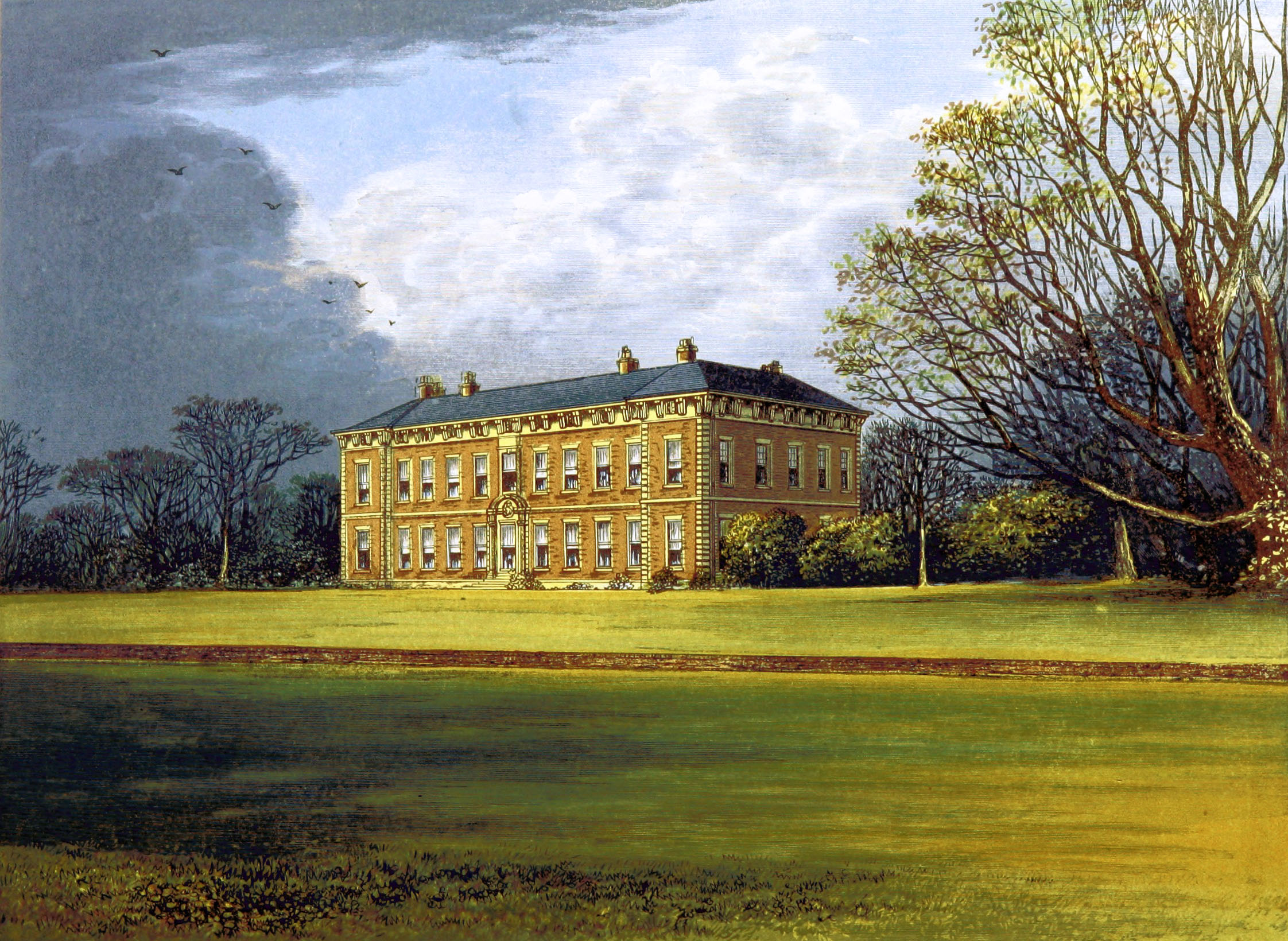
Beningbrough Hall by Alexander Francis Lydon (1880)

John Bourchier (1710–1759) followed his father as owner of Beningbrough Hall and was High Sheriff in 1749. It then passed to Dr. Ralph Bourchier, a 71-year-old physician and from him to his daughter, Margaret, who lived there for 70 years. Today a Bourchier knot is cut into a lawn adjoining the house.

After over 100 years in the Bourchiers' possession, the estate passed in 1827 to the Rev. William Henry Dawnay, the future 6th Viscount Downe, a distant relative. He died in 1846 and left the house to his second son, Payan, who was High Sheriff for 1851. The house was neglected, prompting fears that it might have to be demolished. In 1916, however, a wealthy heiress, Enid Scudamore-Stanhope, Countess of Chesterfield, bought it and immediately set about its restoration, filling it with furnishings and paintings from her husband's ancestral home, Holme Lacy in Herefordshire.

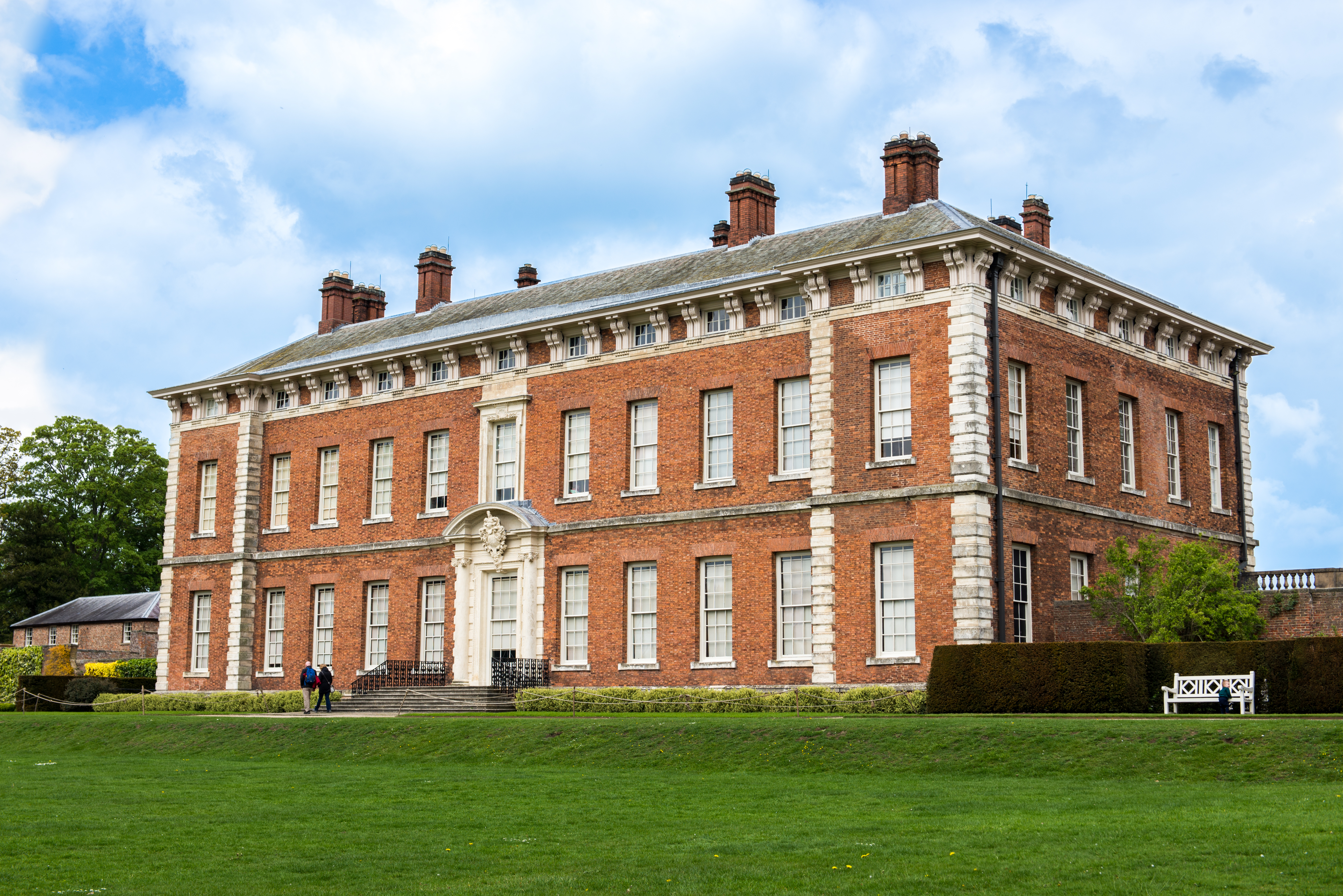
Rear facade of Beningbrough Hall

During the Second World War the hall was occupied by the Royal Air Force then latterly, the Royal Canadian Air Force, when under No. 6 Group of Bomber Command, they took over some of the bases in the region (such as the nearby RAF Linton-on-Ouse and RAF Leeming).

Lady Chesterfield died in 1957, and in June 1958 the estate was acquired by the National Trust after it had been accepted by the government in lieu of death duties at a cost of £29,250. Initially, following the acquisition, the National Trust sought, unsuccessfully, to let the premises out for £1 per week.

In partnership with the National Portrait Gallery the hall now exhibits more than a hundred 18th-century portraits and has seven new interpretation galleries called 'Making Faces: 18th-century Style'. Outside the main building there is a Victorian laundry and a walled garden with fruit and vegetable planting, the produce from which is used by the walled garden restaurant.

Beningbrough Hall includes a wilderness play area, community orchard, an Italianate border and garden shop. It hosts events, activity days, family art workshops, and an annual food and craft festival which in 2010 was a Big Green Festival.

== Architecture ==
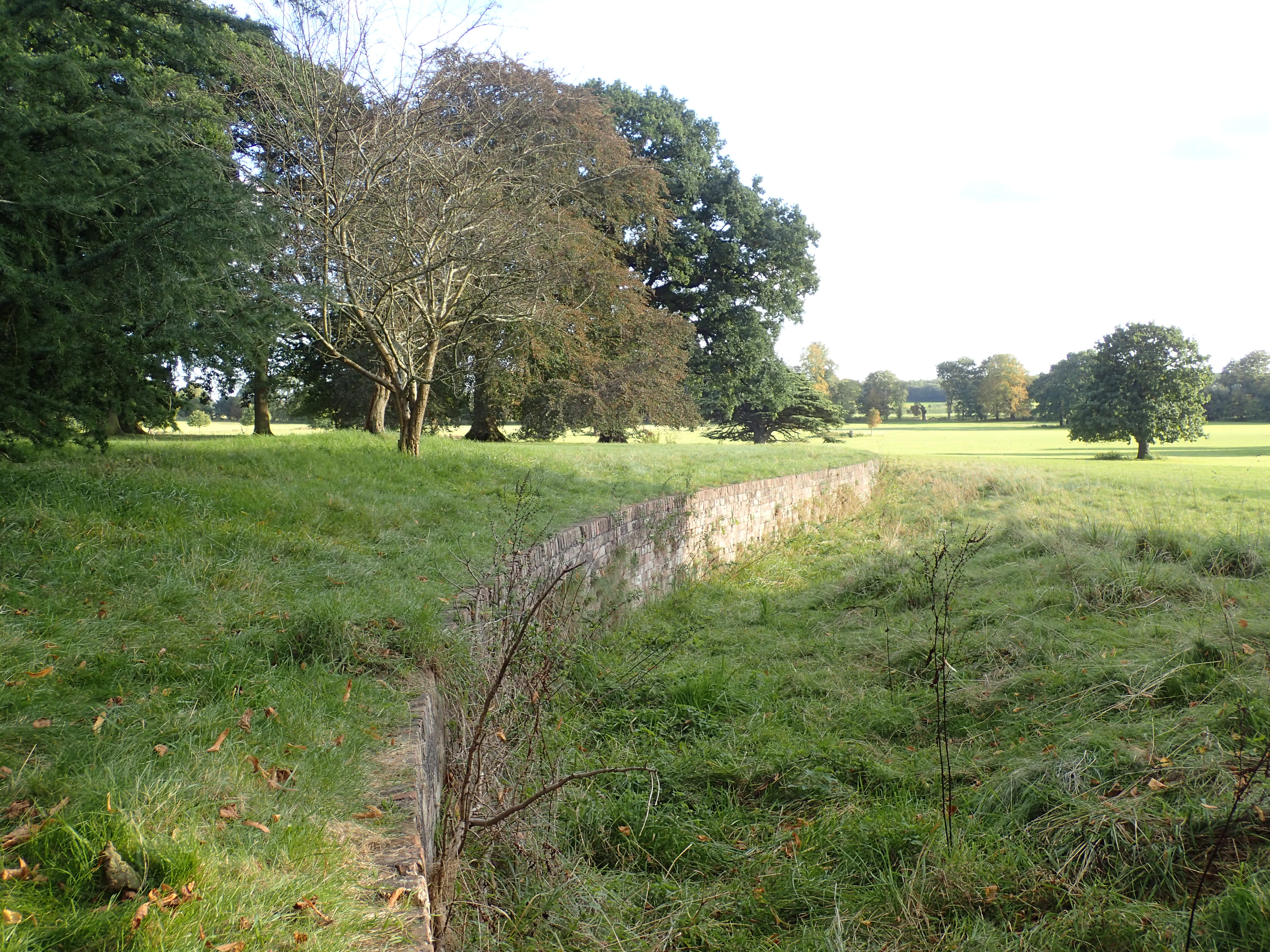
The ha-ha at Beningbrough Hall gardens

=== House ===
The house is built of red brick with stone dressings, quoin strips, floor bands, paired console brackets, a deep moulded cornice and blocking course, and a hipped Westmorland slate roof. There are two storeys, a basement and attics, a double pile plan, fronts of eleven and five bays, and screen walls linking to pavilions. On the main front, the middle three bays project, and in the centre steps with an iron balustrade lead up to a doorway with an architrave, Doric pilasters, and an entablature with a cornice, over which is a decorated cartouche. The windows are sashes with gauged brick arches. The screen walls contain niches and balustrades. The pavilions have two storeys and fronts of a single bay, and each contains angle pilasters, round arches with imposts and keystones, flat-arched windows, and a dentilled cornice. On the roof is a cupola with an ogee lead roof and a ball and spire finial; the left pavilion has a bell, and the right pavilion has a wind clock. At the rear, the central doorway has channelled quoins, attached Ionic columns, a frieze and a cornice, above which is a cartouche and a segmental pediment.

=== Stable Block ===
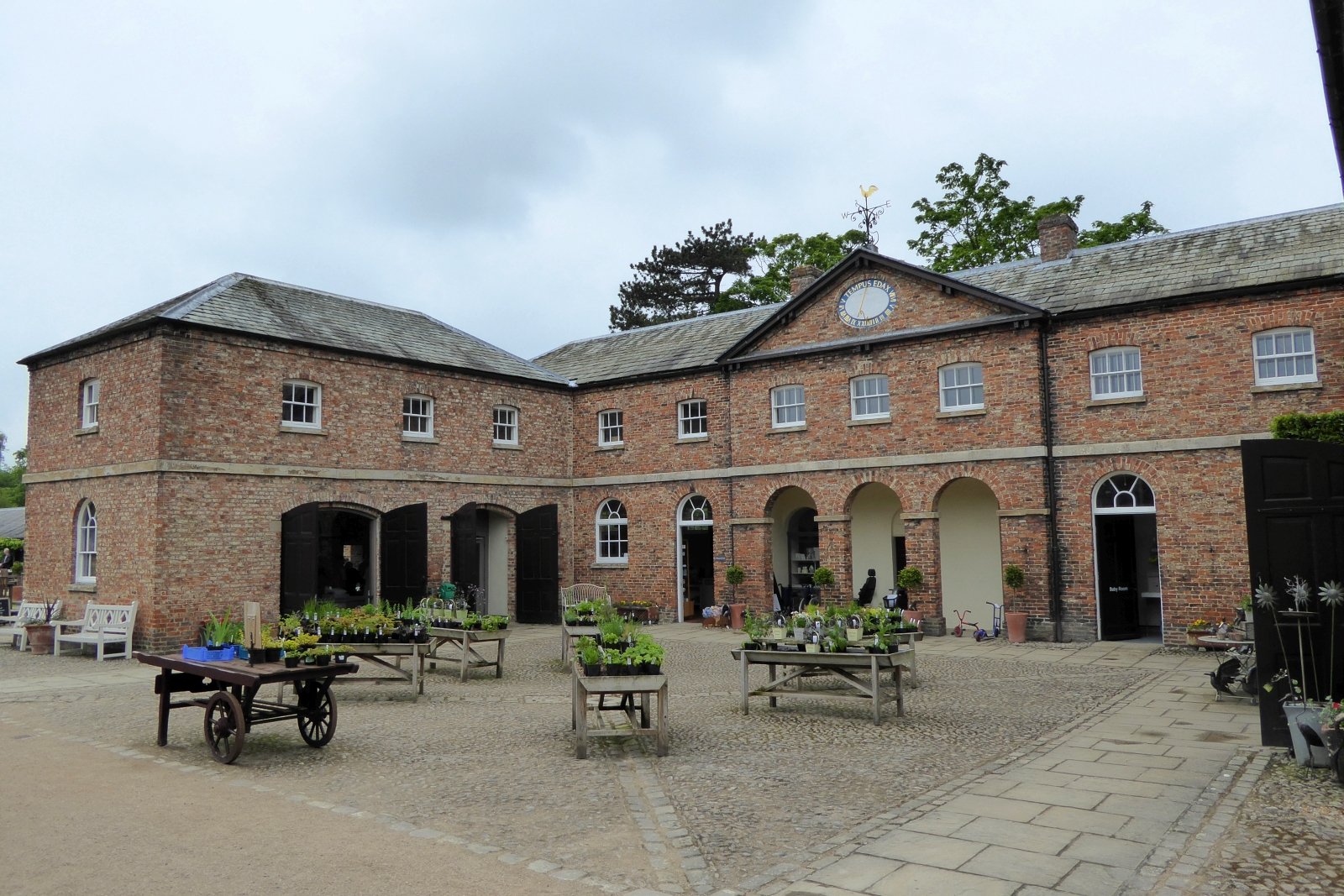
The Stable Block

The grade II-listed Stable Block was built in the mid-18th century. It is built of brick, with stone dressings, floor bands, stepped eaves, and hipped Westmorland slate roofs. There are two storeys and a U-shaped plan, with a main range of seven bays, and side wings of three bays. The middle three bays of the main range project under a pediment containing an oeil-de-boeuf in the tympanum. In the ground floor is an arcade of three round arches with imposts, above which are three windows and a cornice on paired brackets, and on the roof is a cast iron wind vane. The outer bays contain round-arched doorways with fanlights and windows, and in the upper floor are sash windows with segmental heads. The wings contain segmental-headed carriage entrances.

=== Norton Lodge ===
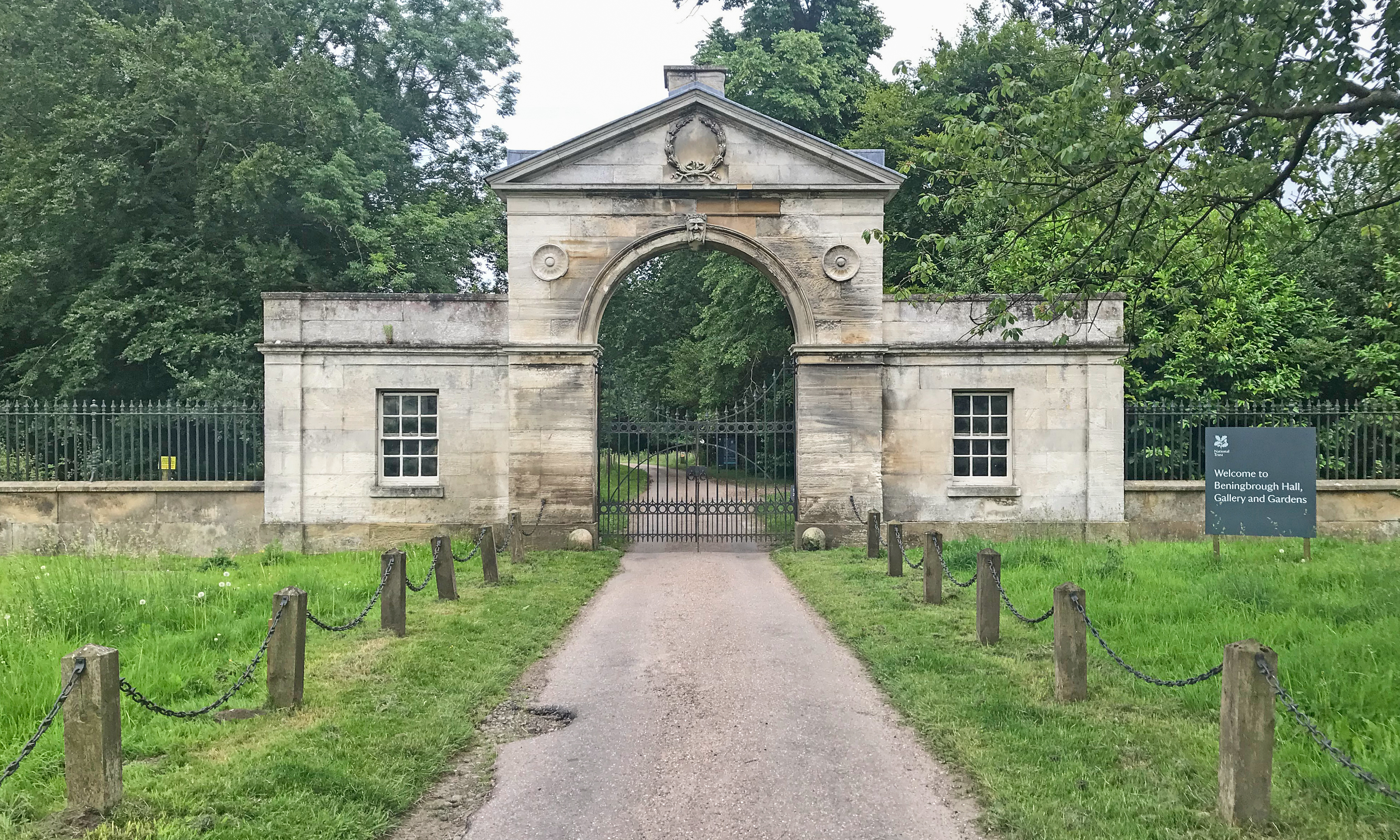
Norton Lodge

Norton Lodge, at the entrance to the grounds, is a late-18th century grade II-listed building. It is built of stone and has a central round-arched gateway on a plinth, with an impost bands extending as cornices, an archivolt with a keystone carved as a head, and flowers in the spandrels. Above it is a corniced pediment with a laurel wreath in the tympanum. The gates are in cast iron. The archway is flanked by single-storey single-bay lodges containing a sash window. On the inner return is a doorway with a plinth, pilasters, a cornice and a blocking course. Flanking the lodges are low coped walls with end piers and capstones, and cast iron railings with spear finials.

== See also ==
- Grade I listed buildings in North Yorkshire (district)
- Listed buildings in Beningbrough
- Bourchier knot, a heraldic representation of the Granny knot or Reef knot used by the Bourchier family.
