= George Townsend Andrews =

British architect (1804–1855)

George Townsend Andrews (19 December 1804 – 29 December 1855) was an English architect born in Exeter. He is noted for his buildings designed for George Hudson's railways, especially the York and North Midland Railway. Andrews' architect's practice in York did not confine itself to railway work, its other buildings including headquarters for two York-based banks and a number of churches.

== Life ==
Andrews' roots lay in Jamaica and in London, but from the 1820s he was mainly in York. He was assistant to Peter Frederick Robinson.

He won a Society of Arts premium in 1824. He was a council member of the Yorkshire Architectural Society, and Sheriff of York in 1846-47, during George Hudson's third term as mayor.

In 1836 he was appointed a Fellow of the Institute of British Architects in London.

He died in York on 29 December 1855.

== Railway work ==
Andrews designed all the buildings, not only the stations, for the York and North Midland Railway (Y&NMR) from the middle of 1839 until the work dried up in 1849 following the downfall of George Hudson. Having designed the new York station jointly for the Y&NMR and the Great North of England Railway (GNER), he went on to design buildings for the GNER as far north as Northallerton. He designed all the buildings for the Newcastle and Darlington Junction Railway and the Yorkshire buildings of the York, Newcastle and Berwick Railway.

The Y&NMR opened its first section from a temporary station outside the walls of York in May 1839 but Hudson wanted to bring the railway into the heart of York, which meant breaching the city walls. Andrews provided the favoured design for the requisite entry in the form of a Tudor arch. The new station was laid out to a plan by Robert Stephenson, which was a development of his plan for Euston station making allowances for York's status as a junction. Andrews designed the station buildings. They comprised two separate trainsheds, joined at each end, producing a hipped appearance, which became one of Andrew's trademarks. Each shed was (like Euston) of 40 ft span and the roof was supported by wrought iron "Euston trusses", giving a more slender airy construction than contemporary wooden station roofs. The train sheds were clad with slate on wooden planking, with the portion nearest the apex being glazed. The main station facilities were ranged along the departure platform with a central booking office flanked by the waiting rooms for each class (and a separate waiting room for ladies); provision was also made for parcels traffic, left luggage, the station master and the maintenance of lamps. On the first floor was the Y&NMR boardroom and offices. Adjacent to the arrivals platform were 1st and 2nd class refreshment rooms and a bar with bedrooms above.

Due to delays in agreeing the building design with the GNER the station was incomplete when services started running to London. It finally opened on 4 January 1841.

The station at York embodied many of the features Andrews was to use in his other medium and large stations for the Y&NMR, in particular the hipped roof supported by "Euston trusses" but in later examples, the glazed portion of the roof was raised and given louvered sides to let smoke and steam out. Locomotives were not originally expected to enter York station but later that roof too was modified. Other features characteristic of Andrew's buildings include marked overhanging eaves and chimney stacks with an arch over the apex of the roof.

== Stations ==
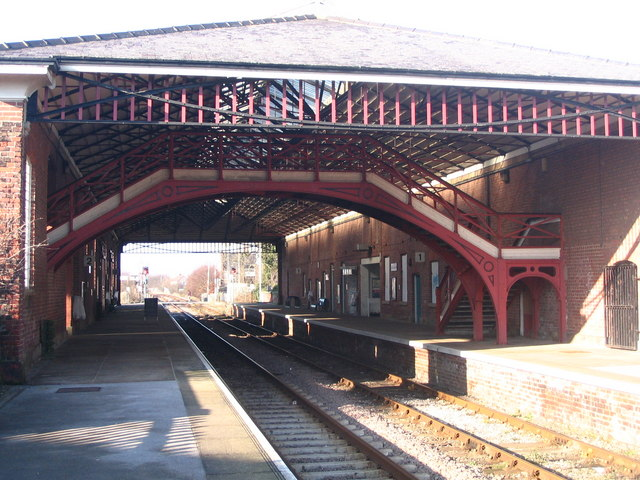
Andrews' Filey railway station

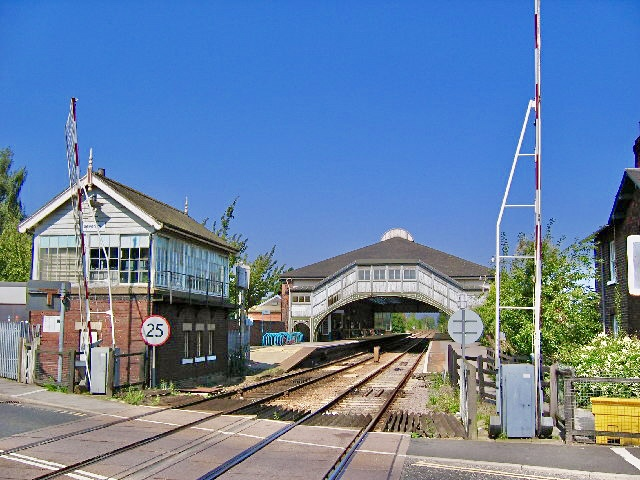
Beverley Station

Stations with an overall roof are denoted thus: Station Name

=== Y&NMR Main Line 1839 ===
- York - opened 1841, Y&NMR station closed 1877, roof removed 1967
- Ulleskelf
- Bolton Percy, closed
- Castleford
- Sherburn-in-Elmet
- Normanton opened 1840, G.T. Andrews "Italian Villa" style station opened September 1841

=== GNER Main Line 1839 ===
- York - opened 1841, Y&NMR station closed 1877, roof removed 1967
- Alne, closed
- Raskelf, closed
- Shipton, closed
- Sessay, closed

=== York to Scarborough, Y&NMR 1845 ===
- Haxby, closed 1930
- Strensall, closed 1930
- Flaxton, closed 1930
- Barton renamed Barton Hill (1853), closed 1930
- Howsham, closed 1849
- Kirkham Abbey, closed 1930
- Castle Howard, closed 1930

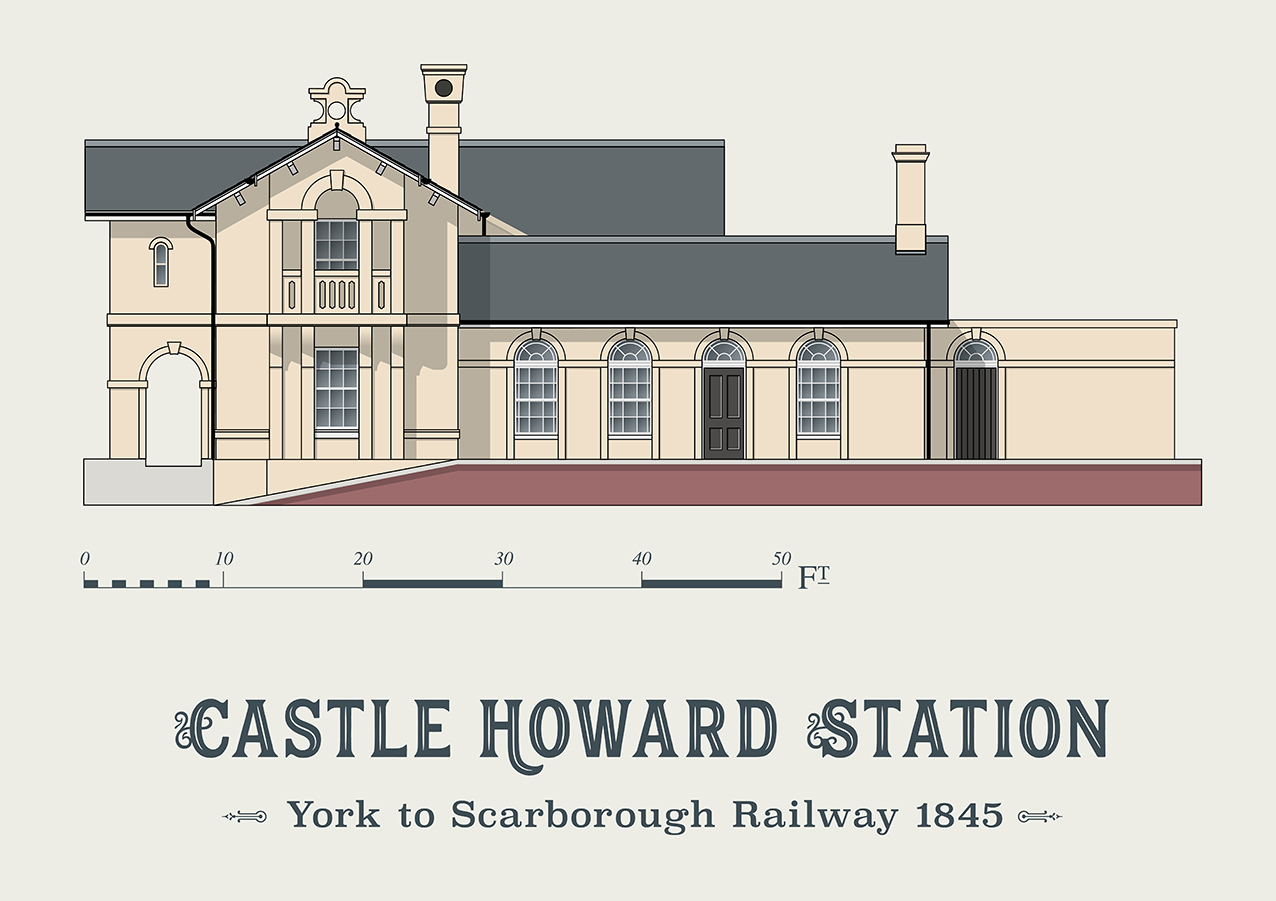
Castle Howard Station Lineside Elevation Drawing

- Huttons renamed Huttons Ambo (1885), closed 1930
- Malton, roof removed 1989
- Rillington, closed 1930, roof removed 1955
- Knapton, closed 1930
- Heslerton, closed 1930
- Sherburn renamed Wykeham (1874), renamed Weaverthorpe (1882), closed 1930
- Ganton, closed 1930
- Seamer
- Scarborough Central - opened 1845

=== Rillington Junction to Whitby, Y&NMR 1845-7 ===
- Marishes Road, closed 1965
- Kirby, closed 1858
- Pickering, roof removed 1952, closed 1965, re-opened (NYMR) 1973, replica GT Andrews design roof now in place..
- Levisham, closed 1965, re-opened (NYMR) 1973
- Goathland (Incline Top), closed 1865
- Grosmont
- Sleights
- Ruswarp
- Whitby, roof removed 1953

=== Seamer to Hull, Y&NMR, 1846-7 ===
- Cayton, closed 1952
- Gristhorpe, closed 1959
- Filey
- Hunmanby
- Speeton, closed 1970
- Bempton
- Marton renamed Flamborough (1884), closed 1970
- Bridlington, roof removed 1961
- Carnaby, closed 1970
- Burton Agnes, closed 1970
- Lowthorpe, closed 1970
- Nafferton
- Driffield, roof removed 1949
- Hutton Cranswick
- Lockington, closed 1960
- Arram
- Beverley
- Cottingham
- Hull Paragon - opened 1848, roof replaced 1904

=== York to Market Weighton, Y&NMR 1847 ===
- Earswick, closed 1965
- Warthill, closed 1959
- Holtby, closed 1939
- Stamford Bridge, closed 1965
- Fangfoss, closed 1959
- Pocklington, closed 1965
- Nunburnholme, closed 1951
- Londesborough, closed 1965
- Market Weighton, roof removed 1947, closed 1965

== Non-railway work ==
- the original buildings of York St John University
- De Grey House 1835
- the De Grey Rooms
- head offices for two banks and the Yorkshire Insurance Company (now Harkers pub on St Helen's Square)
- the Halifax Infirmary
- the Montpelier Baths in Harrogate
- St Mary's Church, Full Sutton 1845
- St Martin's Church, Scampston 1845
- the White Hart Hotel, Harrogate 1846
- Holy Evangelists' Church, Shipton 1849
- St Lawrence's Church, Flaxton 1853
- renovations to some 18 churches, including All Saints' Church, Newton-on-Ouse
- Dewsbury Terrace, York - a terrace of 15 two-storey houses in Bishophill
- Priory Street, York - two pairs of townhouses (no.s 8 & 10, 31 & 33) in Bishophill
- Old School, Newton-on-Ouse
