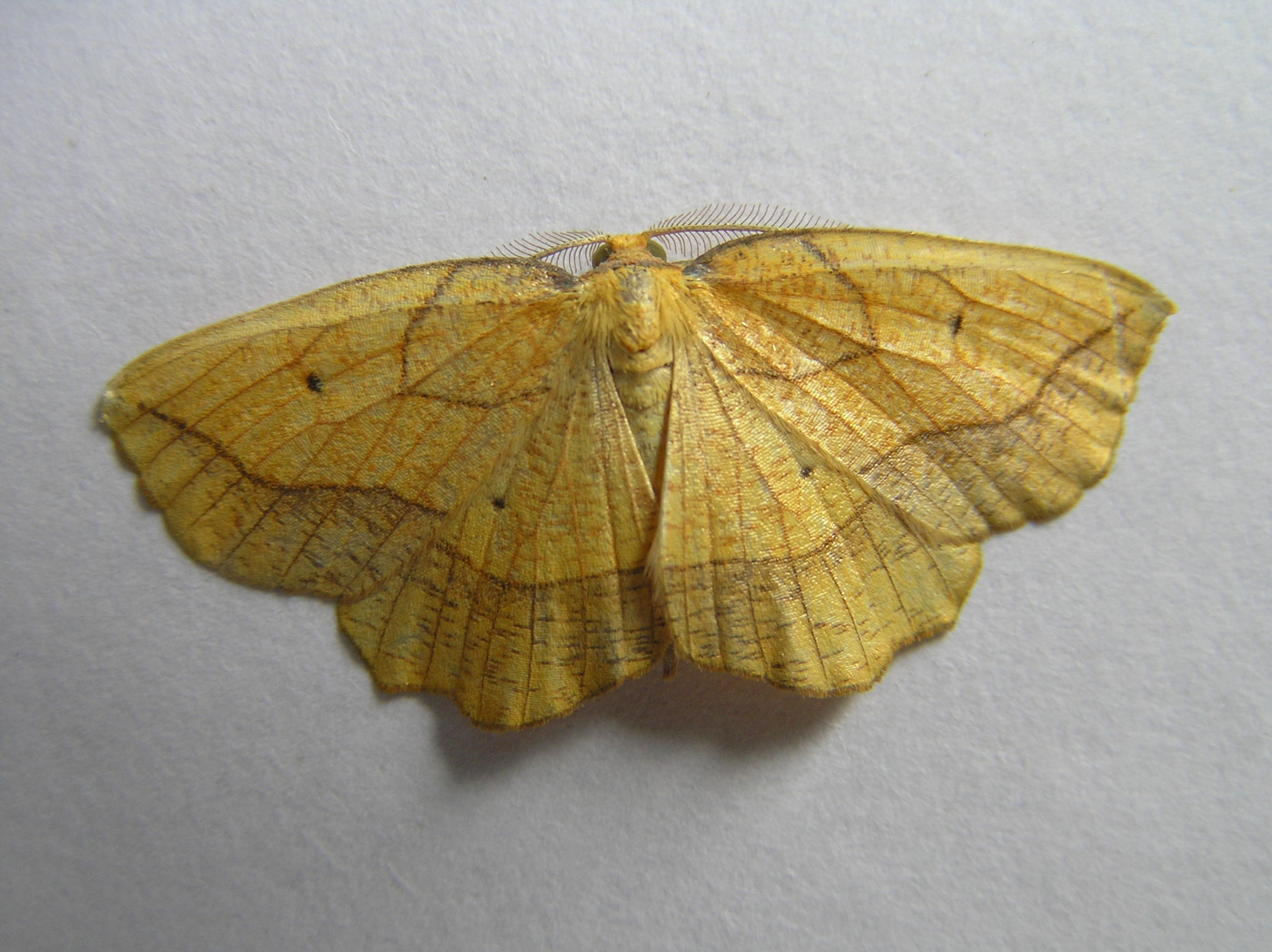

Scientific classification
- Kingdom: Animalia
- Phylum: Arthropoda
- Class: Insecta
- Order: Lepidoptera
- Family: Geometridae
- Genus: Epione
- Species: E. repandaria

Binomial name
- Epione repandaria (Hufnagel, 1767)

= Epione repandaria =

Species of moth

Epione repandaria, the bordered beauty, is a moth of the family Geometridae.

The species can be found in the Palearctic realm from western Europe, to Scandinavia in the north, the Mediterranean in the south, and east to the Caucasus, Russia and Russian Far East, Siberia, Ethiopia and Amur.

== Description ==
The wingspan is 25–30 mm. The length of the forewings is 13–16 mm. The forewing ground colour is yellow with flecks of orange. The wing veins are also orange. The fascia are black-brown. The basal fascia forms a midpoint right angle. The distal fascia ends apically. The distal area is shaded grey and there is a small black discal spot. The hindwing is similar but lacks the basal fascia and the distal fascia does not reach the wing apex.

== Similar species ==
In the similarly coloured Epione vespertaria, the outer transverse line begins at the forewing anterior edge and not at the wing tip

== Biology ==
The moths fly in one generation from July to September.. They are attracted to light.

The caterpillars feed on sallow.

== Notes ==
1. The flight season refers to the British Isles. This may vary in other parts of the range.
