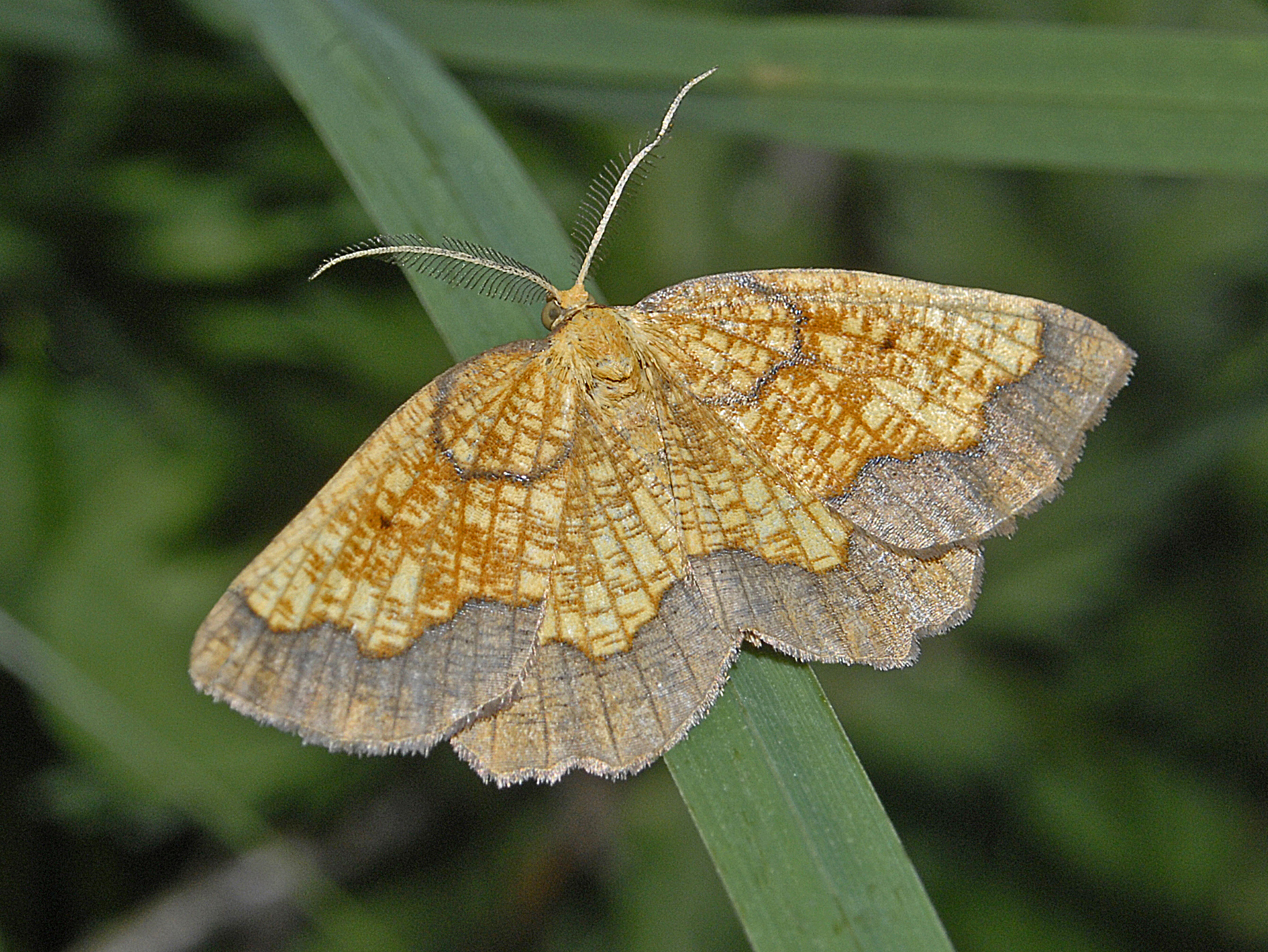
- Male Epione vespertaria

Scientific classification
- Domain: Eukaryota
- Kingdom: Animalia
- Phylum: Arthropoda
- Class: Insecta
- Order: Lepidoptera
- Family: Geometridae
- Tribe: Ourapterygini
- Genus: Epione; Duponchel, 1829

= Epione (moth) =

Genus of moths

Epione is a genus of moths in the family Geometridae first described by Philogène Auguste Joseph Duponchel in 1829.

== Species ==
- Epione emundata (Christoph, 1880)
- Epione exaridaria (Graeser, 1890)
- Epione repandaria (Hufnagel, 1767)
- Epione vespertaria (Linnaeus, 1767)
