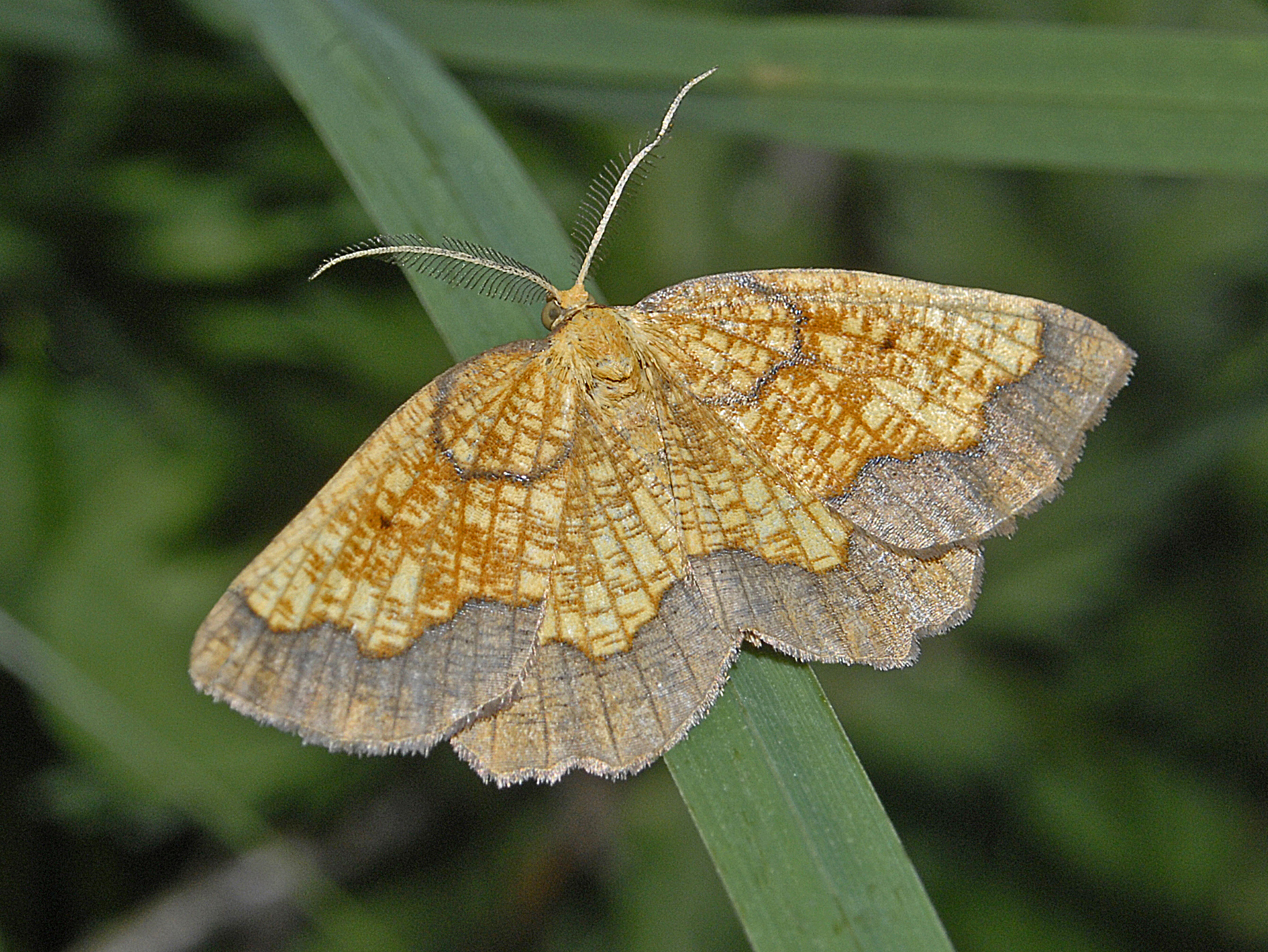
- Epione vespertaria. Male

Scientific classification
- Kingdom: Animalia
- Phylum: Arthropoda
- Clade: Pancrustacea
- Class: Insecta
- Order: Lepidoptera
- Family: Geometridae
- Genus: Epione
- Species: E. vespertaria

Binomial name
- Epione vespertaria (Linnaeus, 1767)

Synonyms
- Phalaena vespertaria Linnaeus, 1767; Epione paralellaria (Denis & Schiffermüller, 1775)

= Epione vespertaria =

Species of moth

Epione vespertaria, the dark bordered beauty, is a moth of the family Geometridae.

== Description ==
The wingspan is 25–30 mm. Adults are sexually dimorphic. In the males the wings are darker and more yellow ocher in colour, while in the females they are pale yellow. Both sexes show on the wings a purplish-grey border of even width (hence the Latin name Epione paralellaria). On the forewings and on the hindwings there is a small black spot. Adults are on wing from the end of June to September in one generation.

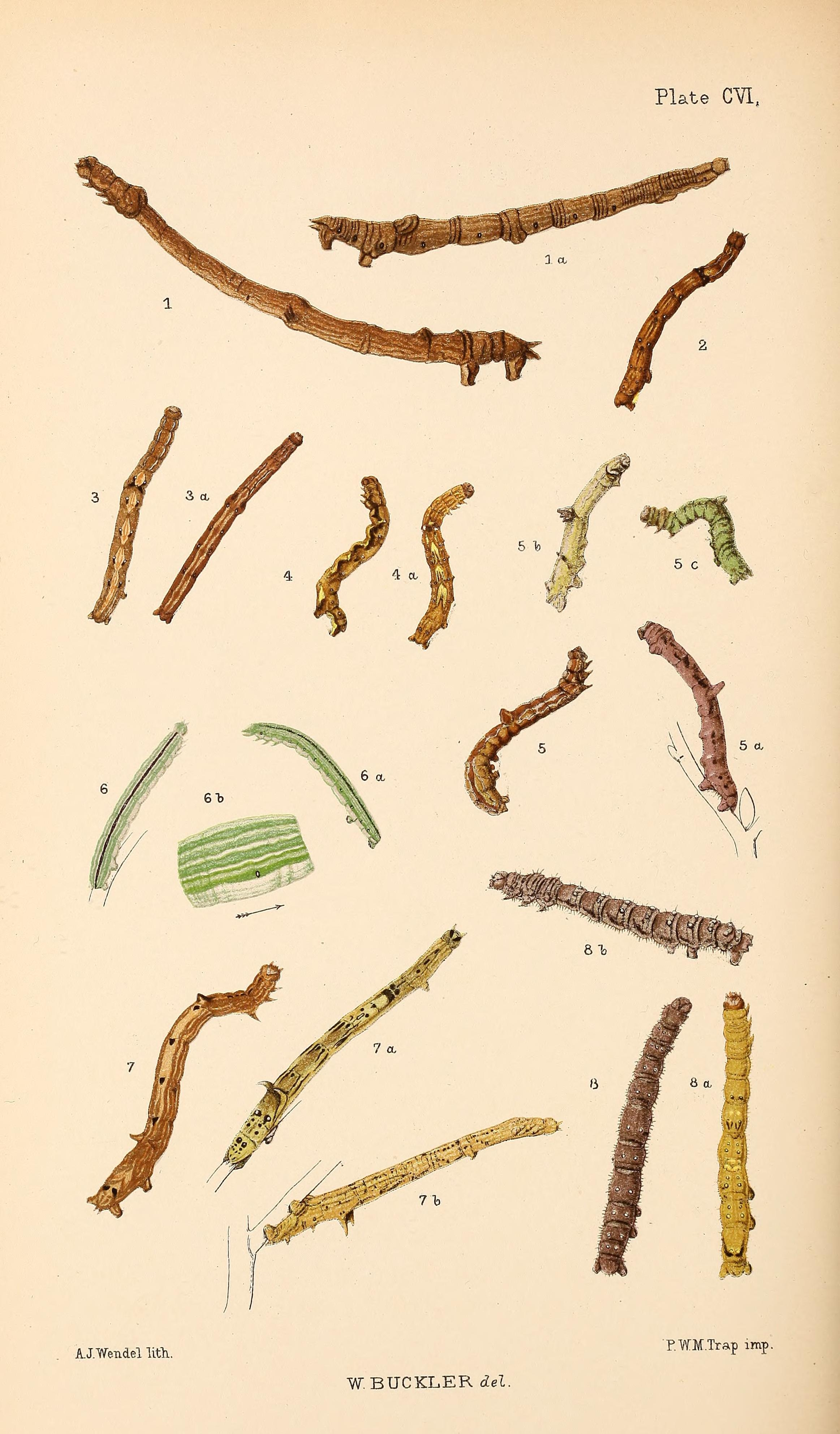
Epione vespertaria larva after final moult on willow

The caterpillars are brown or violet-brown with a whitish tinge underside. They feed on birch (Betula species), hazel (Corylus avellana), aspen (Populus tremula) and willow (Salix species). Larvae can be found from May to June. The species overwinters as an egg.

== Distribution ==
The dark bordered beauty is widespread from western Europe to the Amur River. In England, the species is only recorded at Strensall Common in the City of York, and Wallington Hall, Northumberland.

== Habitat ==
This species can be found in many different habitats (plains, mountains, wet heathlands, damp woodlands, etc.).

== Subspecies ==
- Epione vespertaria vespertaria
- Epione vespertaria amura Wehrli, 1940

== Gallery ==
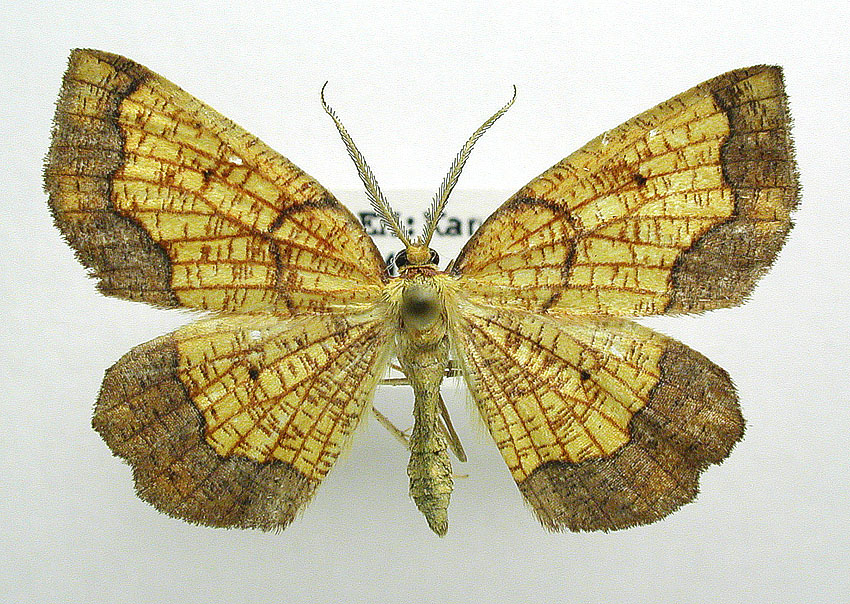
Male of Epione vespertaria. Mounted specimen

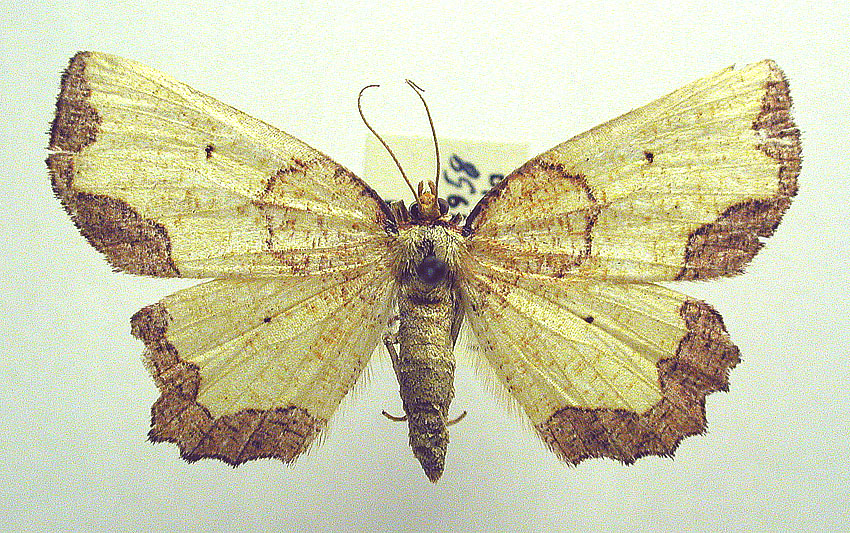
Female of Epione vespertaria. Mounted specimen
