= Listed buildings in the City of York =

There are over 1,600 Listed buildings in City of York, which are buildings of architectural or historic interest.

- Grade I buildings are of exceptional interest.
- Grade II* buildings are particularly important buildings of more than special interest.
- Grade II buildings are of special interest.

The lists follow Historic England’s geographical organisation, with entries grouped by county, local authority, and parish (civil and non-civil).

== City of York unitary authority ==
Parish	Listed buildings list	Grade I	Grade II*	Grade II	Total
Acaster Malbis	Listed buildings in Acaster Malbis	1		3	4
Askham Bryan	Listed buildings in Askham Bryan	1		2	3
Askham Richard	Listed buildings in Askham Richard		1	7	8
Bishopthorpe	Listed buildings in Bishopthorpe	1	3	19	23
Clifton Without	Listed buildings in Clifton Without			1	1
Copmanthorpe	Listed buildings in Copmanthorpe			7	7
Deighton	Listed buildings in Deighton, York			3	3
Dunnington	Listed buildings in Dunnington		1	18	19
Earswick	Listed buildings in Earswick			1	1
Elvington	Listed buildings in Elvington, North Yorkshire		1	11	12
Fulford	Listed buildings in Fulford, North Yorkshire		1	19	20
Haxby	Listed buildings in Haxby			4	4
Heslington	Listed buildings in Heslington		2	30	32
Hessay	Listed buildings in Hessay			4	4
Heworth Without	Listed buildings in Heworth Without			1	1
Holtby	Listed buildings in Holtby			8	8
Huntington	Listed buildings in Huntington, North Yorkshire		1	12	13
Kexby	Listed buildings in Kexby, North Yorkshire		1	1	2
Murton	Listed buildings in Murton, North Yorkshire			4	4
Naburn	Listed buildings in Naburn	1		17	18
Nether Poppleton	Listed buildings in Nether Poppleton		1	14	15
New Earswick	Listed buildings in New Earswick			66	66
Osbaldwick	Listed buildings in Osbaldwick			4	4
Rawcliffe	Listed buildings in Rawcliffe, North Yorkshire			1	1
Rufforth with Knapton	Listed buildings in Rufforth with Knapton			6	6
Skelton	Listed buildings in Skelton, York	1	1	6	8
Stockton-on-the-Forest	Listed buildings in Stockton-on-the-Forest			16	16
Strensall with Towthorpe	Listed buildings in Strensall with Towthorpe			10	10
Upper Poppleton	Listed buildings in Upper Poppleton			9	9
Wheldrake	Listed buildings in Wheldrake	1		23	24
Wigginton	Listed buildings in Wigginton, North Yorkshire			2	2
York (non-civil parish)	Listed buildings in York (within the city walls, northern part); Listed buildings in York (within the city walls, southern part); Listed buildings in York (outside the city walls, northern part); Listed buildings in York (outside the city walls, southern part)	65	159	1,041	1,265
Total		71	172	1,370	1,613

== See also ==
- Grade I listed buildings in North Yorkshire
- Grade II* listed buildings in North Yorkshire
