= Areas of York =

List of areas in York and its district in North Yorkshire, England

York and its district, the City of York, has many distinct localities, suburbs and villages.

== Centre ==
=== Squares ===
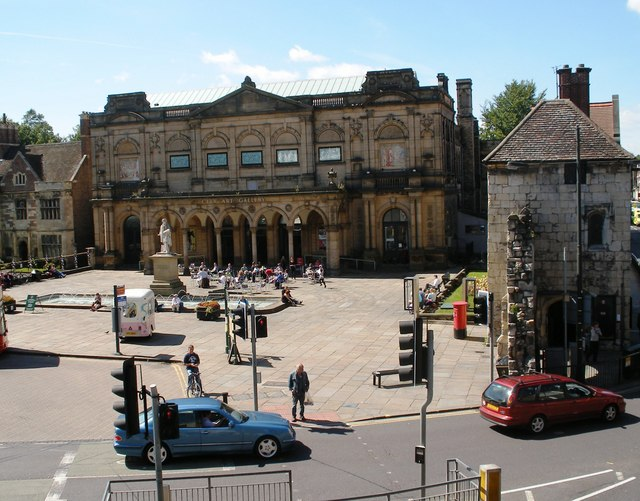
Exhibition Square

York's squares are:

- St Sampson's Square, the old market square at the head of Parliament Street;
- St Helen's Square, anchored by York Mansion House and St Helen's Church on opposing ends of the square, it also links to York Guildhall which is behind the mansion house overlooking the River Ouse;
- King's Square, anchored by York's Chocolate Story;
- Shambles Market Square, developed in the 1950s, the current market square;
- Queen Elizabeth Square, a planned square at Duncombe Place next to the Minster, name in honour of the late Queen Elizabeth II;
- Coppergate Shopping Centre square, developed in the 1980s and anchored by the Jorvik Viking Centre and St Mary's Church museums.
- Exhibition Square, it is anchored by the York Art Gallery and Bootham Bar, it is surrounded by defensive walls from the city wall's differing alignments through history.

=== Middle ===
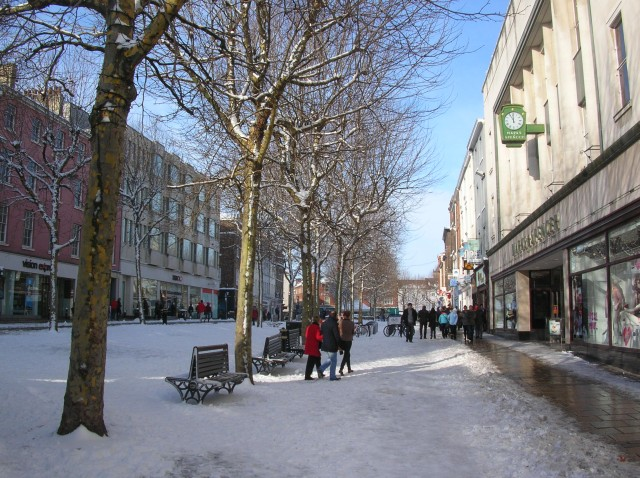
Parliament Street in Winter

Parliament Street is wide, pedestrianised, and lined with large London planes. It is the city centre's main street, central to the network of gates, snickelways and squares. It was created in the early Victorian Era merging two marketplaces, St Sampson's Square and Pavement.

York Castle is to the north of a peninsula formed by the Foss flowing into the Ouse. It is an area with multiple parts such as the Eye of York green, Clifford's Tower, Tower Gardens, the crown court and York Castle Museum.

=== North West ===
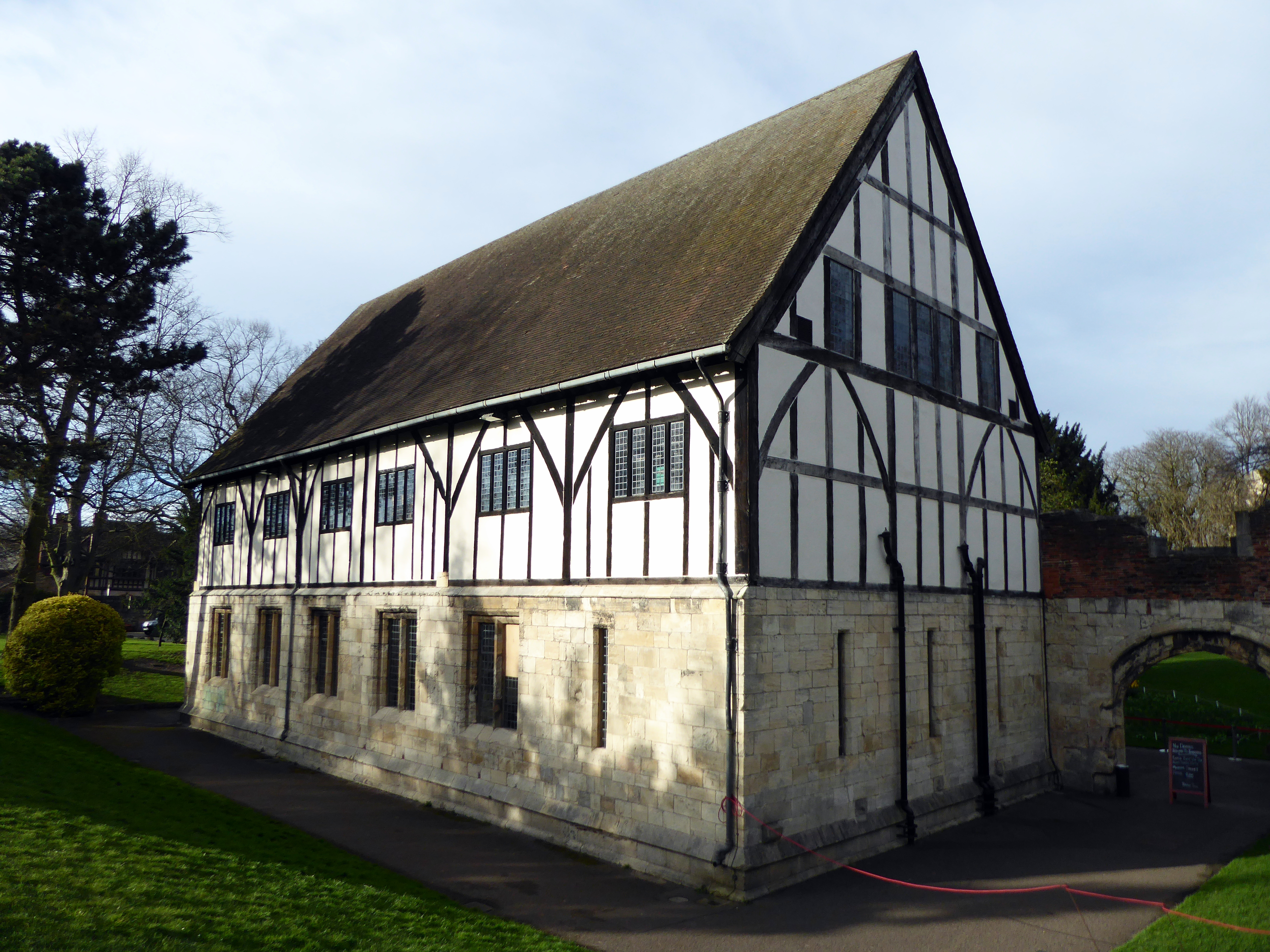
The Hospitium

North west of the centre is the walled Museum Gardens, the Hospitum, St Olave's Church and ruins of St Mary's Abbey. North west of the gardens is Bootham. The city's medical facilities are concentrated at Bootham with Bootham Park Hospital and York Hospital. The latter hospital borders Bootham Stray and Bootham itself borders Clifton.

=== North east ===
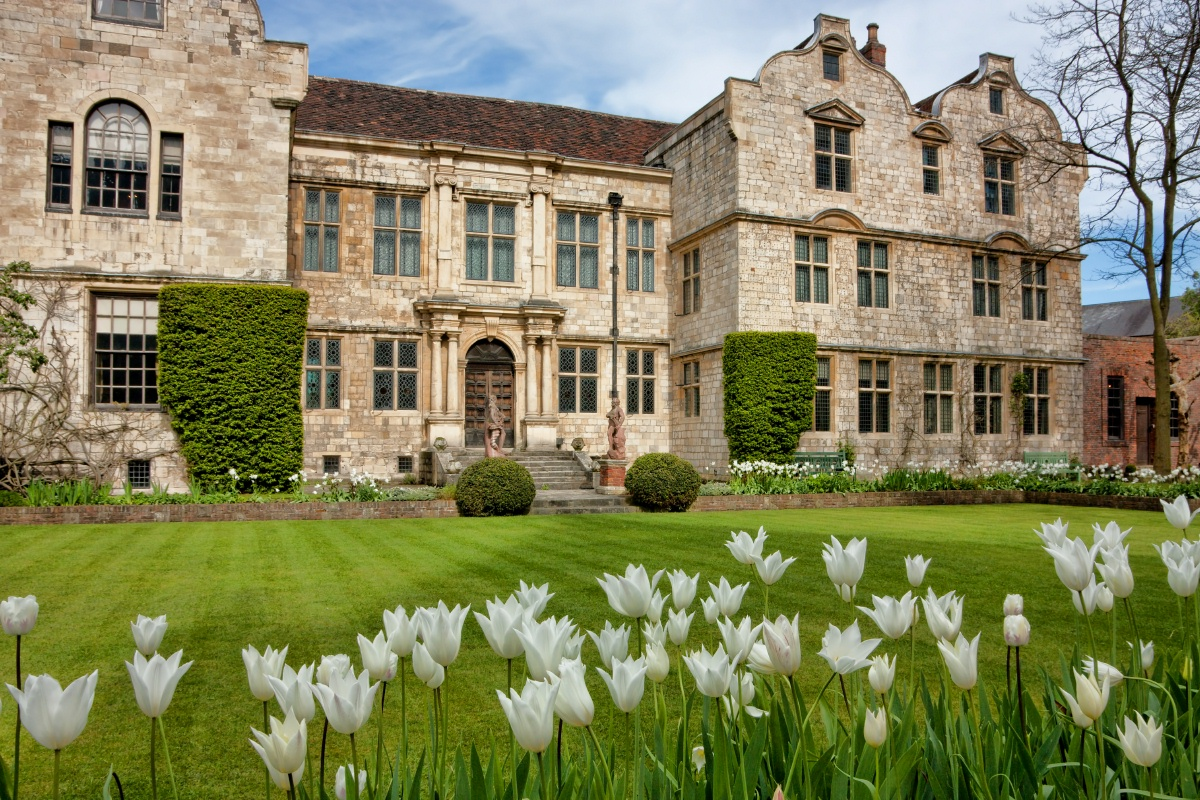
Treasurer's House

North-east from Foss Bridge to Bootham Bar is a quieter area of the city. On the Bootham Bar end is Petergate with the green space of Dean's Park, York Minster and the Treasurer's House. North east of this, outside the walls, is York St John University's Campus.

Halfway down is Goodramgate with shops on the gate and on Monkgate, other streets in the area are for housing. The walls end at Layerthorpe, King's Fishpool formerly existed here, this meant that walls in the area were not needed.

Near the bridge is Fossgate. Apart from Fossgate, the area is high density housing and offices, including the Government's DEFRA. The DIG centre is based here.

=== South east ===
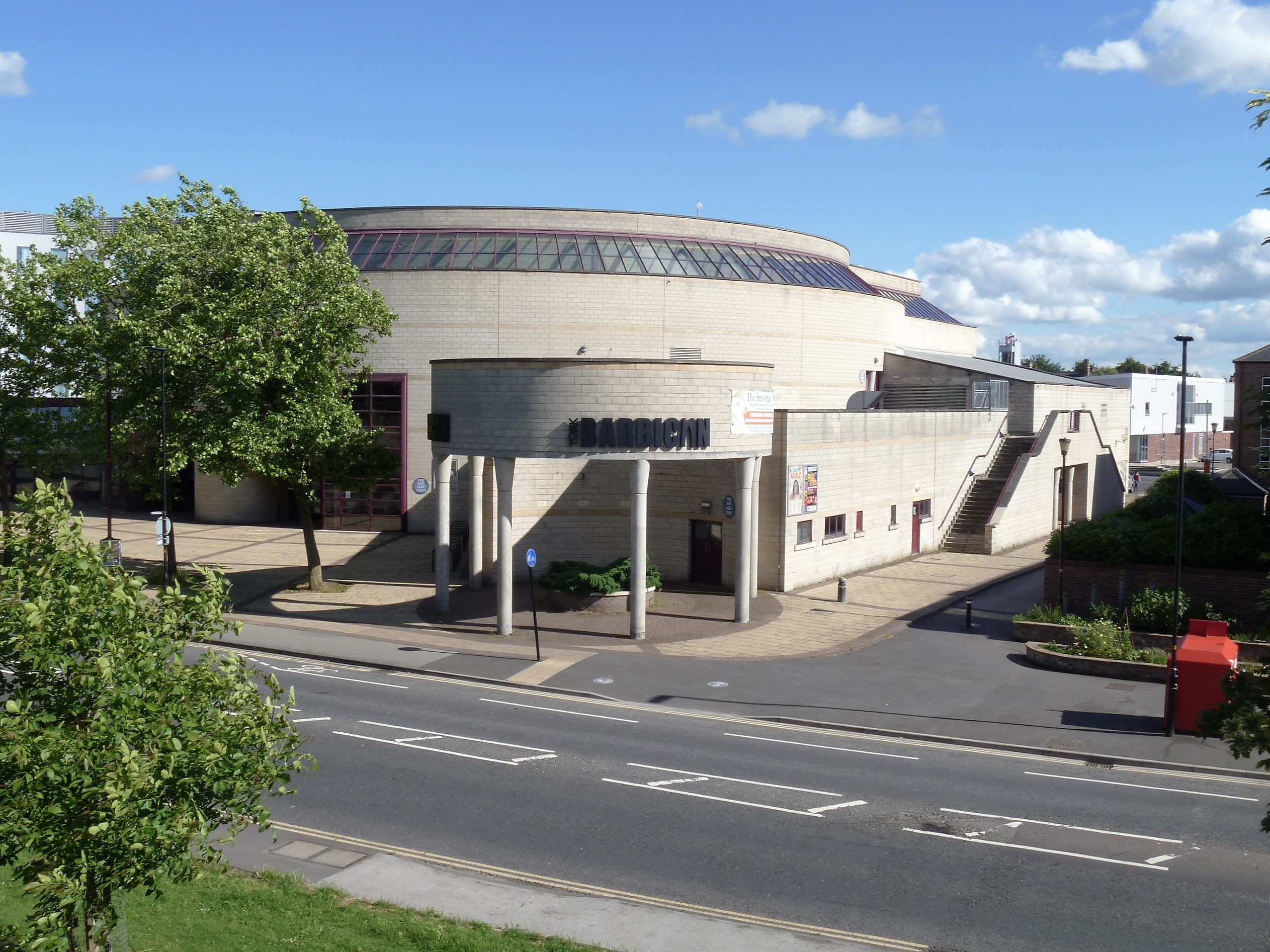
The Barbican Centre

The walled centre's area east of the River Foss is centred upon Piccadilly, Walmgate; after the walls Fishergate and Lawrence Street. Walmgate and Lawrence Street have small shops on both sides creating a main shopping thoroughfare through the area while Piccadilly has hotels.

From just north of Walmgate bar, the area outside the walls is light industrial with a number of supermarkets. From Red Tower to the Layerthorpe, along the Foss, the city walls have been removed. Near Fishergate Bar is York Barbican.

The centre reaches from Walmgate Stray to Monk Stray; neighbouring Fulford, Heslington, Osbaldwick and Heworth.

=== South west ===
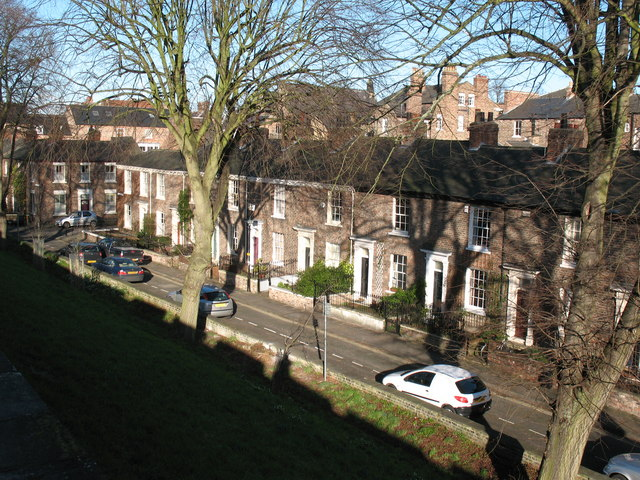
Lower Priory Street

Bishophill is the walled centre's area west of the River Ouse. The area is residential to the south, Micklegate is the main thoroughfare for trade and offices are found along the Ouse (off Skeldergate) and north of Micklegate (off Toft Green and Tanner Row).

North and east of Bishophill is Bishops Fields. The north of Bishophill and Bishops Fields are dominated by the railway; multiple offices, York station and the National Railway Museum.

Micklegate becomes Blossom Street which goes towards the Micklegate Stray, which includes the Knavesmire. This part of the centre neighbours Holgate, Dringhouses, South Bank, Clementhorpe and Middlethorpe.

== Outer ==
The York Built-up area is defined by the Office for National Statistics for census purposes.

Placename	Council ward	Parliament	Population (2001)	Population (2011)	Postcode
Acomb	Acomb, Westfield	York Central	21,419	22,215	YO24
Bishophill	Micklegate	York Central			YO1
Bootham	Guildhall	York Central			YO30
Clifton	Clifton, Rawcliffe & Clifton Without (part)	York Central	12,017	13,548	YO30
Clifton Without	Rawcliffe & Clifton Without	York Outer	5,113	5,246	YO30
Dringhouses	Dringhouses & Woodthorpe	York Outer	10,733	11,084	YO24
Earswick	Strensall	York Outer	819	876	YO32
Fishergate	Fishergate	York Central	7,921	9,844	YO10
Fulford	Fulford & Heslington	York Outer	2,595	2,785	YO10
Groves	Guildhall	York Central			YO31
Heslington	Fulford & Heslington (part), Hull Road (part)	York Outer	4,122	4,792	YO10
Heworth	Heworth, Heworth Without (part)	York Central (part), York Outer (part)	13,725	15,434	YO31
Heworth Without	Heworth Without	York Outer	2,283	2,191	YO31
Holgate	Holgate	York Central	11,564	12,832	YO24
Huntington	Huntington & New Earswick	York Outer	9,277	9,371	YO31
Layerthorpe	Heworth	York Central			YO31
New Earswick	Huntington & New Earswick	York Outer	2,812	2,737	YO32
Osbaldwick	Osbaldwick & Derwent	York Outer	2,726	2,902	YO10
Rawcliffe	Rawcliffe and Clifton Without	York Outer	5,407	6,511	YO30
South Bank	Micklegate	York Central			YO23
Tang Hall	Heworth	York Central			YO31
Woodthorpe	Dringhouses & Woodthorpe	York Outer			YO24
York City Centre	Guildhall, Micklegate	York Central			YO1

== District ==
The individual areas of the City of York are all within the Unitary Authority area as defined by the Fifth Periodical Report, Volume 4, "Mapping for the Non-Metropolitan Counties and the Unitary Authorities as published by the Boundary Commission For England", specifically on pages 106–109. Population details are taken from the UK Census of 2001 and 2011. Some areas that have a population for 2001 are taken from local ecclesiastical parish information and has not been updated for 2011. Other areas without any population information is due to a lack of ecclesiastical parish information, mostly because the area has never been one and is included only due to it being an identifiable and distinct area according to Ordnance Survey maps.

Placename	Council ward	Parliament	Population (2001)	Population (2011)	Postcode
Acaster Malbis	Bishopthorpe	York Outer	578	669	YO23
Askham Bryan	Rural West York	York Outer	582	564	YO23
Askham Richard	Rural West York	York Outer	273	351	YO23
Bishopthorpe	Bishopthorpe	York Outer	3,174	3,237	YO23
Copmanthorpe	Copmanthorpe	York Outer	4,262	4,173	YO23
Crockey Hill	Wheldrake	York Outer			YO19
Deighton	Wheldrake	York Outer	308	291	YO19
Dunnington	Osbaldwick & Derwent	York Outer	3,194	3,230	YO19
Elvington	Wheldrake	York Outer	1,212	1,239	YO41
Haxby (town)	Haxby & Wigginton	York Outer	8,754	8,248	YO32
Hessay	Rural West York	York Outer	181	265	YO26
Holtby	Osbaldwick & Derwent	York Outer	152	166	YO19
Kexby	Osbaldwick & Derwent	York Outer	194	231	YO41
Knapton	Rural West York	York Outer	222		YO26
Middlethorpe	Bishopthorpe	York Outer			YO23
Murton	Osbaldwick & Derwent	York Outer	423	668	YO19
Naburn	Wheldrake	York Outer	470	516	YO19
Nether Poppleton	Rural West York	York Outer	2,077	2,141	YO26
Rufforth	Rural West York	York Outer	560		YO26
Skelton	Rural West York	York Outer	1,640	1,549	YO31
Stockton on the Forest	Strensall	York Outer	1,261	1,214	YO32
Strensall	Strensall	York Outer	3,815		YO32
Towthorpe	Strensall	York Outer	1,967		YO32
Upper Poppleton	Rural West York	York Outer	1,961	1,997	YO26
Wheldrake	Wheldrake	York Outer	1,909	2,107	YO19
Wigginton	Haxby & Wigginton	York Outer	3,174	3,160	YO32
