= List of schools in York =

This is a list of schools in the unitary authority of the City of York.

== State-funded schools ==
=== Primary schools ===
- Acomb Primary School, Acomb
- Archbishop of York's CE Junior School, Bishopthorpe
- Badger Hill Primary Academy, Badger Hill
- Bishopthorpe Infant School, Bishopthorpe
- Burton Green Primary School, Clifton
- Carr Infant School, Acomb
- Carr Junior School, Acomb
- Clifton Green Primary School, Clifton
- Clifton with Rawcliffe Primary School, Rawcliffe
- Copmanthorpe Primary School, Copmanthorpe
- Dringhouses Primary School, Dringhouses
- Dunnington CE Primary School, Dunnington
- Elvington CE Primary School, Elvington
- Fishergate Primary School, Fishergate
- Haxby Road Primary School, Clifton
- Headlands Primary School, Haxby
- Hempland Primary School, Heworth
- Heworth CE Primary Academy, Heworth
- Hob Moor Community Primary Academy, Acomb
- Huntington Primary Academy, Huntington
- Knavesmire Primary School, South Bank
- Lakeside Primary Academy, Clifton Moor
- Lord Deramore's Primary School, Heslington
- Naburn CE Primary School, Naburn
- New Earswick Primary School, New Earswick
- Osbaldwick Primary Academy, Osbaldwick
- Our Lady Queen of Martyrs RC Primary School, Holgate
- Park Grove Primary Academy, The Groves
- Poppleton Ousebank Primary School, Upper Poppleton
- Poppleton Road Primary School, Holgate
- Ralph Butterfield Primary School, Haxby
- Robert Wilkinson Primary School, Strensall
- Rufforth Primary School, Rufforth
- St Aelred's RC Primary School, Tang Hall
- St Barnabas CE Primary School, Holgate
- St George's RC Primary School, Fishergate
- St Lawrence's CE Primary Academy, Heslington
- St Mary's CE Primary School, Askham Richard
- St Oswald's CE Primary School, Fulford
- St Paul's CE Primary School, Holgate
- St Wilfrid's RC Primary School, Monkgate
- Scarcroft Primary School, South Bank
- Skelton Primary School, Skelton
- Stockton-on-the-Forest Primary School, Stockton-on-the-Forest
- Tang Hall Primary Academy, Tang Hall
- Westfield Primary School, Acomb
- Wheldrake with Thorganby CE Primary School, Wheldrake
- Wigginton Primary School, Wigginton
- Woodthorpe Primary School, Woodthorpe
- Yearsley Grove Primary School, Huntington

=== Secondary schools ===
- All Saints School, South Bank
- Archbishop Holgate's School, Tang Hall
- Fulford School, Fulford
- Huntington School, Huntington
- Joseph Rowntree School, New Earswick
- Manor Church of England Academy, Nether Poppleton
- Millthorpe School, South Bank
- Vale of York Academy, Clifton Without
- York High School, Acomb

=== Special and alternative schools ===
- Applefields School, Tang Hall
- Danesgate Community, Fulford
- Hob Moor Oaks Academy, Acomb

=== Further education ===
- Askham Bryan College
- York College

== Independent schools ==
=== Primary and preparatory schools ===
- St Peter's 2-8, Clifton
- York Steiner School, Fulford

=== Senior and all-through schools ===
- Bootham School, Bootham
- The Mount School, South Bank
- OneSchool Global UK, Middlethorpe
- St Peter's School, Clifton
