= Ryedale District =

Former local government district in England

Coordinates: 54.139°N 0.79°W

Ryedale
- Non-metropolitan district
- Ryedale shown within North Yorkshire
- Sovereign state: United Kingdom
- Constituent country: England
- Region: Yorkshire and the Humber
- Ceremonial county: North Yorkshire
- Administrative HQ: Malton (Ryedale House)

Government
  - Type: Ryedale District Council
  - Leadership: Alternative
  - Executive

Area
  - Total: 582 sq mi (1,507 km^{2})

Population (2021)
  - Total: 54,897
  - Density: 94.35/sq mi (36.43/km^{2})
- Time zone: UTC+0 (Greenwich Mean Time)
  - Summer (DST): UTC+1 (British Summer Time)
- ONS code: 36UF (ONS); E07000167 (GSS)
- Ethnicity: 99.4% White
- Website: ryedale.gov.uk

Ryedale was a non-metropolitan district in North Yorkshire, England. It was in the Vale of Pickering, a low-lying flat area of land drained by the River Derwent. The Vale's landscape is rural with scattered villages and towns. It has been inhabited continuously from the Mesolithic period. The economy was largely agricultural with light industry and tourism playing an increasing role.

Towns included Helmsley, Kirkbymoorside, Malton, Norton-on-Derwent, and Pickering. Part of Ryedale lies within the North York Moors National Park. The A64 passed through Ryedale and villages such as Rillington. In the 2011 Census, the population of this primarily rural area of 150,659 hectares, the largest district in North Yorkshire, was 51,700.

== Derivation of name ==
The name refers to the River Rye and was previously used for the Ryedale wapentake of Yorkshire, which covered roughly the same area.

== History ==
In the Middle Ages, there were markets in several Ryedale towns; Malton, Pickering, Kirkbymoorside, and Helmsley. A monastery was built at Lastingham in 654. Over the centuries, Celts, Romans and Anglo Saxons all inhabited the area around Pickering. The district had many ancient Saxon churches and some can still be visited, including St Peter's in Scrayingham, St Martin's in Wharram Percy, St Martins in Bulmer, St Helens in Amotherby, All Saints in Appleton-le-Street, St Peter and St Paul's Church, Pickering, All Saints in Hovingham, Holy Trinity in Stonegrave, St Gregory's Minster, Kirkdale built around 1055-1065, All Saints in Sinnington and St Andrews in Ailsby/Middleton. The Kirkdale sundial above St Gregory's door dates to the 11th century (c. 1055 to 1065).

Several abbeys and priories were also built in the 12th century, including Kirkham Priory, the very large Byland Abbey, and the finest ruined abbey in Yorkshire, Rievaulx Abbey near Helmsley; it was seized in 1538 during the dissolution of the monasteries. All can be seen but all are ruins. Ampleforth Abbey and the Catholic Ampleforth College were acquired by the English Congregation of Benedictines in 1802.

Ryedale has two impressive castles, both now ruins. The traditional style Pickering Castle was a royal hunting lodge with a moat, while Helmsley Castle was a fine medieval structure with double earthworks. The latter was extensively damaged during the Civil War, in 1644.

Ryedale District Council was established on 1 April 1974 under the Local Government Act 1972, and was a merger of urban district of Norton and Norton Rural District, from the historic East Riding of Yorkshire, along with the urban districts of Malton and Pickering with Flaxton Rural District, Helmsley Rural District, Kirkbymoorside Rural District, Malton Rural District and Pickering Rural District, all from the North Riding of Yorkshire. Ryedale District Council elections were held every four years. The district lost about half of its population in 1996, when an expanded City of York became a unitary authority area, specifically the parishes of Clifton Without, Earswick, Haxby, Heworth Without, Holtby, Huntington, Murton, New Earswick, Osbaldwick, Rawcliffe, Skelton, Stockton-on-the-Forest, Strensall, Towthorpe, and Wigginton. According to the 2001 census, those parishes that were moved into York had a combined population of 50,163, while the population of those parishes remaining in Ryedale district, which numbered 50,872.

In July 2021 the Ministry of Housing, Communities and Local Government announced that in April 2023, the non-metropolitan county would be reorganised into a unitary authority. Ryedale District Council was abolished and its functions transferred to a new single authority for the non-metropolitan county of North Yorkshire.

== Economy ==
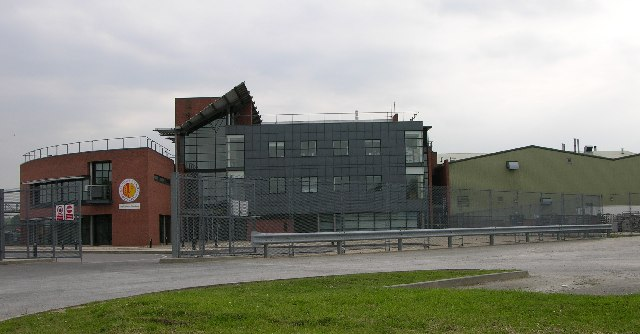
Once the Malton Bacon Factory was the town's largest employer; Karro Foods now has a processing plant here

The market towns of Helmsley, Kirkbymoorside, Pickering and Malton were the largest centres of population in the Ryedale District with about half of the population living there. The eastern part of the area is dominated by the influence of Scarborough. Each of the market towns within the Ryedale District had areas set aside for industrial use and small firms engaged in light industry and the service industries occupy these. The largest employer in the district was the pork processor Karro Food Group (once known as The Malton Bacon Factory), now employing around 1,100 people in this location.

The village of Sherburn in what was eastern Ryedale is home to factories of both Severfield and the Kingspan Group who purchased the local Ward Brothers steelworks business. The Kingspan factory also hosts a 5 MW solar array, one of the largest commercial rooftop solar projects in the UK.

Between 1981 and 2022, the district had hosted the Ryedale Festival, which features concerts and performances at various venues during the summer months.

== Media ==
In terms of television, the area is served by both BBC Yorkshire and ITV Yorkshire broadcasting from either the Emley Moor or Oliver's Mount TV transmitters and BBC North East and Cumbria and ITV Tyne Tees which broadcast from the Bilsdale TV transmitter which is near Helmsley.

Radio stations for the area are BBC Radio York, Greatest Hits Radio York and North Yorkshire, YO1 Radio, This is The Coast, and Coast & County Radio.

Ryedale is served by the following local newspapers:

- Malton and Pickering Mercury
- Gazette and Herald
- The York Press.
- The Northern Echo

== Notable residents ==
- One Night Only, Indie-pop band
- Richard Buck, athlete
- Francis Jackson, organist and composer
- James Martin, chef and television personality
- James Norton, actor
- Selina Scott, television presenter
- Ryan Swain, television and radio presenter, skateboarder

== Demographics ==
Of all districts in the Yorkshire and the Humber region, Ryedale had the lowest rate of teenage pregnancy between 2000 and 2013, and remained below the national average for England.
