= Listed buildings in Askham Bryan =

Askham Bryan is a civil parish in the unitary authority of the City of York, North Yorkshire, England. It contains three listed buildings that are recorded in the National Heritage List for England. Of these, one is listed at Grade I, the highest of the three grades, and the others are at Grade II, the lowest grade. The parish contains the village of Askham Bryan and the surrounding area. All the listed buildings are in the village, and consist of a church, a house and a war memorial.

== Key ==
Grade	Criteria
I	Buildings of exceptional interest, sometimes considered to be internationally important
II	Buildings of national importance and special interest

== Buildings ==
Name and location	Photograph	Date	Notes	Grade
St Nicholas' Church; 53.92945°N 1.15807°W		Late 12th century	The church, which has been altered through the centuries, is in magnesian limestone and sandstone, with a red tile roof. It consists of a continuous nave and chancel, a south porch and a north vestry. On the west end is a bell turret with a single-arched opening on a corbel frieze, with a cross. The porch has a round arch with three orders, with chevron moulding and decorated capitals, and two orders of nook shafts. The windows have round-arched heads, chamfered surrounds and hood moulds, and there is a round-headed priest's door. At the east end are three windows and an oculus above.	I
The Doctor's House; 53.92849°N 1.16361°W		Early to mid-18th century	The house, which has been extended, is in pinkish-brown brick, with stone dressings, brick quoins, a floor band, a wooden eaves band, and a roof of pantile and Welsh slate. There are two storeys and an L-shaped plan, with a front of four bays and a later wing on the left. The doorway has reeded pilasters with acanthus caps, and an entablature, with a dentilled cornice on acanthus consoles. The windows are sashes in architraves, and at the rear are three bow windows.	II
War memorial 53.92924°N 1.15835°W		1919	The war memorial is in the churchyard of St Nicholas' Church and is in Portland stone. It consists of a Latin cross with a moulded foot, on a square plinth, on a square base of one step. The cross head and shaft have an ornate Celtic knot work design in relief. In the centre of the cross head is a carved symbol of a cross within a circle. On the plinth are inscriptions and the names of those lost in the First World War.	II
