= Listed buildings in New Earswick =

New Earswick is a model village and civil parish in the unitary authority of City of York in the ceremonial county of North Yorkshire, England. It contains 66 grade II listed buildings that are recorded in the National Heritage List for England.

This list is based on the information retrieved online from Historic England.

== Key ==
Grade	Criteria
I	Buildings that are of exceptional interest
II*	Particularly important buildings of more than special interest
II	Buildings that are of special interest

== Listing ==
Name	Grade	Location	Type	Completed (Note: The date given is the date used by Historic England as significant for the initial building or that of an important part in the structure's description.)	Date designated	Grid ref. (Note: The grid reference is based on the British national grid reference system, sometimes known as OSGB36, used by the Ordnance Survey.) Geo-coordinates	Notes	Entry number (Note: The "List Entry Number" is a unique number assigned to each listed building and scheduled monument by Historic England.)	Image	Wikidata
1-7, Chestnut Grove	II	1-7, Chestnut Grove			12 December 1986	SE6098055291; 53°59′24″N 1°04′17″W		1173100	Upload Photo	Q26467877
2-8, Chestnut Grove	II	2-8, Chestnut Grove			12 December 1986	SE6101055303; 53°59′25″N 1°04′16″W		1315986	Upload Photo	Q26602322
9-15, Chestnut Grove	II	9-15, Chestnut Grove			12 December 1986	SE6095755351; 53°59′26″N 1°04′18″W		1149171	Upload Photo	Q26442097
10-16, Chestnut Grove	II	10-16, Chestnut Grove			12 December 1986	SE6099955328; 53°59′25″N 1°04′16″W		1149162	Upload Photo	Q26442088
18 and 20, Chestnut Grove	II	18 and 20, Chestnut Grove			12 December 1986	SE6098655357; 53°59′26″N 1°04′17″W		1149163	Upload Photo	Q26442089
21-27, Chestnut Grove	II	21-27, Chestnut Grove			12 December 1986	SE6098955420; 53°59′28″N 1°04′17″W		1173025	Upload Photo	Q26467802
22 and 24, Chestnut Grove	II	22 and 24, Chestnut Grove			12 December 1986	SE6098855377; 53°59′27″N 1°04′17″W		1315987	Upload Photo	Q26684477
26 and 28, Chestnut Grove	II	26 and 28, Chestnut Grove			12 December 1986	SE6100355387; 53°59′27″N 1°04′16″W		1149164	Upload Photo	Q26442090
29-35, Chestnut Grove	II	29-35, Chestnut Grove			12 December 1986	SE6100655436; 53°59′29″N 1°04′16″W		1315953	Upload Photo	Q26602291
30-36, Chestnut Grove	II	30-36, Chestnut Grove			12 November 1986	SE6102655414; 53°59′28″N 1°04′15″W		1315988	Upload Photo	Q26602324
37-51, Chestnut Grove	II	37-51, Chestnut Grove			12 December 1986	SE6101355448; 53°59′29″N 1°04′15″W		1149170	Upload Photo	Q26442096
50-56, Chestnut Grove	II	50-56, Chestnut Grove			12 December 1986	SE6107255462; 53°59′30″N 1°04′12″W		1149165	Upload Photo	Q26442091
53-59, Chestnut Grove	II	53-59, Chestnut Grove			12 December 1986	SE6104855483; 53°59′30″N 1°04′13″W		1172986	Upload Photo	Q26467764
58-64, Chestnut Grove	II	58-64, Chestnut Grove			12 December 1986	SE6110255504; 53°59′31″N 1°04′10″W		1149166	Upload Photo	Q26442092
61 and 63, Chestnut Grove	II	61 and 63, Chestnut Grove			12 December 1986	SE6106655504; 53°59′31″N 1°04′12″W		1149169	Upload Photo	Q26442095
65-71, Chestnut Grove	II	65-71, Chestnut Grove			12 December 1986	SE6109755587; 53°59′34″N 1°04′11″W		1172965	Upload Photo	Q26467742
66 and 68, Chestnut Grove	II	66 and 68, Chestnut Grove			12 December 1986	SE6110655512; 53°59′31″N 1°04′10″W		1315989	Upload Photo	Q26602325
70 and 72, Chestnut Grove	II	70 and 72, Chestnut Grove			12 December 1986	SE6112055529; 53°59′32″N 1°04′09″W		1149167	Upload Photo	Q26442093
73 and 75, Chestnut Grove	II	73 and 75, Chestnut Grove			12 December 1986	SE6110455610; 53°59′35″N 1°04′10″W		1315952	Upload Photo	Q26602290
74-80, Chestnut Grove	II	74-80, Chestnut Grove			12 December 1986	SE6111955547; 53°59′32″N 1°04′09″W		1172941	Upload Photo	Q26467709
77-83, Chestnut Grove	II	77-83, Chestnut Grove			12 December 1986	SE6111055636; 53°59′35″N 1°04′10″W		1172958	Upload Photo	Q26467734
82-88, Chestnut Grove	II	82-88, Chestnut Grove			12 December 1986	SE6113155585; 53°59′34″N 1°04′09″W		1315951	Upload Photo	Q26602289
90-96, Chestnut Grove	II	90-96, Chestnut Grove			12 December 1986	SE6113555598; 53°59′34″N 1°04′08″W		1172950	Upload Photo	Q26467723
98-104, Chestnut Grove	II	98-104, Chestnut Grove			12 December 1986	SE6114055637; 53°59′35″N 1°04′08″W		1149168	Upload Photo	Q26442094
Hall Cottage	II	Hawthorne Terrace			12 December 1986	SE6085855251; 53°59′23″N 1°04′24″W		1296375	Upload Photo	Q26584037
The Folk Hall	II	Hawthorne Terrace			12 December 1986	SE6084355196; 53°59′21″N 1°04′25″W		1315956	Upload Photo	Q26602294
Western House and the Surgery	II	Hawthorne Terrace			12 December 1986	SE6085355282; 53°59′24″N 1°04′24″W		1149174	Upload Photo	Q26442100
The Village School	II	Hawthorne Terrace			12 December 1986	SE6084455537; 53°59′32″N 1°04′24″W		1173129	Upload Photo	Q26467905
1-4, Hawthorne Terrace	II	1-4, Hawthorne Terrace			12 December 1986	SE6090855244; 53°59′23″N 1°04′21″W		1315954	Upload Photo	Q26602292
5-8, Hawthorne Terrace	II	5-8, Hawthorne Terrace			12 December 1986	SE6090855261; 53°59′23″N 1°04′21″W		1173102	Upload Photo	Q26467879
9-12, Hawthorne Terrace	II	9-12, Hawthorne Terrace			12 December 1986	SE6091155320; 53°59′25″N 1°04′21″W		1149172	Upload Photo	Q26442098
13-16, Hawthorne Terrace	II	13-16, Hawthorne Terrace			12 December 1986	SE6092655361; 53°59′27″N 1°04′20″W		1173111	Upload Photo	Q26467888
17-20, Hawthorne Terrace	II	17-20, Hawthorne Terrace			12 December 1986	SE6093455392; 53°59′28″N 1°04′20″W		1149173	Upload Photo	Q26442099
21-24, Hawthorne Terrace	II	21-24, Hawthorne Terrace			12 December 1986	SE6094155454; 53°59′30″N 1°04′19″W		1173120	Upload Photo	Q26467897
Red Oaks	II	27, Hawthorne Terrace			12 December 1986	SE6093355546; 53°59′33″N 1°04′20″W		1315955	Upload Photo	Q26602293
1-5, Ivy Place	II	1-5, Ivy Place			12 December 1986	SE6095255247; 53°59′23″N 1°04′19″W		1149175	Upload Photo	Q26442101
6-12, Ivy Place	II	6-12, Ivy Place			12 December 1986	SE6099455269; 53°59′24″N 1°04′16″W		1173169	Upload Photo	Q26467942
Numbers 13-15 and Archway to Right	II	13-15, Ivy Place			12 December 1986	SE6103055268; 53°59′24″N 1°04′14″W		1149176	Upload Photo	Q26442102
16-20, Ivy Place	II	16-20, Ivy Place			12 December 1986	SE6103855258; 53°59′23″N 1°04′14″W		1296324	Upload Photo	Q26583986
2-8, Poplar Grove	II	2-8, Poplar Grove			12 December 1986	SE6099255062; 53°59′17″N 1°04′17″W		1149177	Upload Photo	Q26442103
10-16, Poplar Grove	II	10-16, Poplar Grove			12 December 1986	SE6100855081; 53°59′17″N 1°04′16″W		1173218	Upload Photo	Q26467990
18-24, Poplar Grove	II	18-24, Poplar Grove			12 December 1986	SE6103855129; 53°59′19″N 1°04′14″W		1149178	Upload Photo	Q26442104
1-7, Station Avenue	II	1-7, Station Avenue			12 December 1986	SE6091455201; 53°59′21″N 1°04′21″W		1296334	Upload Photo	Q26583996
9-21, Station Avenue	II	9-21, Station Avenue			12 December 1986	SE6096755201; 53°59′21″N 1°04′18″W		1149179	Upload Photo	Q26442105
10-16, Station Avenue	II	10-16, Station Avenue			12 December 1986	SE6100255154; 53°59′20″N 1°04′16″W		1149180	Upload Photo	Q26442106
18-24, Station Avenue	II	18-24, Station Avenue			12 December 1986	SE6106055153; 53°59′20″N 1°04′13″W		1173241	Upload Photo	Q26468011
23-31, Station Avenue	II	23-31, Station Avenue			12 December 1986	SE6099555201; 53°59′21″N 1°04′16″W		1173233	Upload Photo	Q26468004
1-7, Sycamore Avenue	II	1-7, Sycamore Avenue			12 December 1986	SE6109155558; 53°59′33″N 1°04′11″W		1149181	Upload Photo	Q26442107
2 and 4, Sycamore Avenue	II	2 and 4, Sycamore Avenue			12 December 1986	SE6107855526; 53°59′32″N 1°04′12″W		1149141	Upload Photo	Q26442068
6 and 8, Sycamore Avenue	II	6 and 8, Sycamore Avenue			12 December 1986	SE6104455532; 53°59′32″N 1°04′13″W		1173308	Upload Photo	Q26468079
9-17, Sycamore Avenue	II	9-17, Sycamore Avenue			12 December 1986	SE6105555569; 53°59′33″N 1°04′13″W		1296308	Upload Photo	Q26583972
10 and 12, Sycamore Avenue	II	10 and 12, Sycamore Avenue			12 December 1986	SE6103255532; 53°59′32″N 1°04′14″W		1315976	Upload Photo	Q26602313
14 and 16, Sycamore Avenue	II	14 and 16, Sycamore Avenue			12 December 1986	SE6100855535; 53°59′32″N 1°04′15″W		1173287	Upload Photo	Q26468058
18 and 20, Sycamore Avenue	II	18 and 20, Sycamore Avenue			12 December 1986	SE6099455538; 53°59′32″N 1°04′16″W		1149140	Upload Photo	Q26442067
19-27, Sycamore Avenue	II	19-27, Sycamore Avenue			12 December 1986	SE6098855579; 53°59′34″N 1°04′17″W		1149182	Upload Photo	Q26442108
22 and 24, Sycamore Avenue	II	22 and 24, Sycamore Avenue			12 December 1986	SE6097455542; 53°59′32″N 1°04′17″W		1173269	Upload Photo	Q26468040
Hartside	II	26, Sycamore Avenue			12 December 1986	SE6095555542; 53°59′32″N 1°04′18″W		1149139	Upload Photo	Q26442066
29-35, Sycamore Avenue	II	29-35, Sycamore Avenue			12 December 1986	SE6096055582; 53°59′34″N 1°04′18″W		1173259	Upload Photo	Q26468030
3 and 4, Sycamore Place	II	3 and 4, Sycamore Place			12 December 1986	SE6097155627; 53°59′35″N 1°04′17″W		1173340	Upload Photo	Q26468110
5-9, Sycamore Place	II	5-9, Sycamore Place			12 December 1986	SE6099055641; 53°59′36″N 1°04′16″W		1315977	Upload Photo	Q26602314
14-18, Sycamore Place	II	14-18, Sycamore Place			12 December 1986	SE6105555632; 53°59′35″N 1°04′13″W		1173346	Upload Photo	Q26468115
19 and 20, Sycamore Place	II	19 and 20, Sycamore Place			12 December 1986	SE6106955614; 53°59′35″N 1°04′12″W		1149142	Upload Photo	Q26442069
1 and 2, Western Terrace	II	1 and 2, Western Terrace			12 December 1986	SE6091855146; 53°59′20″N 1°04′21″W		1173357	Upload Photo	Q26468127
3, 4, 5 and 6, Western Terrace	II	3, 4, 5 and 6, Western Terrace			12 December 1986	SE6093155145; 53°59′20″N 1°04′20″W		1149143	Upload Photo	Q26442070
7-13, Western Terrace	II	7-13, Western Terrace			12 December 1986	SE6095955092; 53°59′18″N 1°04′18″W		1315978	Upload Photo	Q26602315
14-16, Western Terrace	II	14-16, Western Terrace			12 December 1986	SE6097055038; 53°59′16″N 1°04′18″W		1173374	Upload Photo	Q26468141

== See also ==
- Grade I listed buildings in North Yorkshire
- Grade II* listed buildings in North Yorkshire
