= Vale of York (constituency) =

UK Parliament constituency (1997–2010)

Coordinates: 54.098°N 1.190°W

- Former county constituency for the House of Commons
- Boundary of Vale of York in North Yorkshire for the 2005 general election

- Location of North Yorkshire within England
- County: North Yorkshire
- Major settlements: Haxby, Rawcliffe, Clifton Without, Thirsk, Bedale, Easingwold

1997–2010
- Seats: One
- Created from: Ryedale, Richmond, Yorks, Harrogate, Skipton and Ripon
- Replaced by: See text

Vale of York was a county constituency represented in the House of Commons of the Parliament of the United Kingdom. It elected one Member of Parliament (MP) by the first past the post system of election.

== History ==
The constituency was created in 1997 from parts of the seats of Ryedale, Harrogate, Skipton and Ripon, & Richmond (Yorks). It was abolished in 2010.

== Boundaries ==
The District of Hambleton wards of Bedale, Carlton Miniott, Crakehall, Crayke, Easingwold, Helperby, Hillside, Huby-Sutton, Leemming, Shipton, Sowerby, Stillington, Tanfield, The Thorntons, Thirsk, Tollerton, Topcliffe, and Whitestonecliffe, the District of Ryedale wards of Clifton Without, Haxby North East, Haxby West, New Earswick, Rawcliffe, Skelton, and Wigginton, and the Borough of Harrogate wards of Boroughbridge, Claro, Marston Moor, Nether Poppleton, Newby, Ouseburn, Spofforth, Upper Poppleton, and Wathvale.

This constituency covered the more northerly parts of the Vale of York and included the north-western suburbs of York and the market towns of Easingwold, Bedale, Boroughbridge and Thirsk. The three largest settlements were from the York suburbs.

The reconfiguration of North Yorkshire's constituencies by the Boundary Commission for England saw the creation of a York Central and a York Outer. The populous York suburbs became part of York Outer. Easingwold, Thirsk and surrounding villages joined rural Ryedale to form a new Thirsk and Malton constituency. Bedale rejoined the Richmond constituency. Boroughbridge became part of an enlarged Harrogate seat, while Skipton & Ripon regained some of the surrounding villages. The enlarged Selby and Ainsty seat now encompasses Marston Moor and Spofforth.

== Members of Parliament ==
Election	Member	Party
1997	Anne McIntosh	Conservative
2010	constituency abolished: see York Outer, Thirsk and Malton, Richmond (Yorks), Harrogate and Knaresborough, Selby and Ainsty & Skipton and Ripon	

== Elections ==
=== Elections in the 2000s ===
General election 2005: Vale of York
Party	Candidate	Votes	%	±%
Conservative	Anne McIntosh	26,025	51.7	+0.1
Labour	David Scott	12,313	24.4	−1.4
Liberal Democrats	Jeremy Wilcock	12,040	23.9	+3.7
Majority		13,712	27.3	+1.5
Turnout		50,378	66.3	+0.2
Conservative hold		Swing	+0.7	

General election 2001: Vale of York
Party	Candidate	Votes	%	±%
Conservative	Anne McIntosh	25,033	51.6	+6.9
Labour	Chris Jukes	12,516	25.8	−0.7
Liberal Democrats	Greg Stone	9,799	20.2	−3.6
UKIP	Peter Thornber	1,142	2.4	New
Majority		12,517	25.8	+7.6
Turnout		48,490	66.1	−9.9
Conservative hold		Swing		

=== Elections in the 1990s ===
General election 1997: Vale of York
Party	Candidate	Votes	%	±%
Conservative	Anne McIntosh	23,815	44.7	
Labour	Matt Carter	14,094	26.5	
Liberal Democrats	Charles Hall	12,656	23.8	
Referendum	Clive Fairclough	2,503	4.7	
SDP	Tony Pelton	197	0.4	
Majority		9,721	18.2	
Turnout		53,265	76.0	
Conservative win (new seat)				

== See also ==
- List of parliamentary constituencies in North Yorkshire
