= Listed buildings in Deighton, York =

Deighton is a civil parish in the unitary authority of the City of York, North Yorkshire, England. It contains three listed buildings that are recorded in the National Heritage List for England. All the listed buildings are designated at Grade II, the lowest of the three grades, which is applied to "buildings of national importance and special interest". The parish contains the village of Deighton and the surrounding countryside, and the listed buildings consist of two houses and a farmhouse.

== Buildings ==
| Name and location | Photograph | Date | Notes |
|---|---|---|---|
| Deighton Hall; 53.88809°N 1.05159°W | | Early 18th century | The house is in orange brick, with a three-course floor band, moulded stone sills, and a roof of pantile and stone slate. There are two storeys and five bays, and a square plan. The central doorway has a fanlight, the windows are sashes, and all the openings are under flat arches of red rubbed brick. On the left side is an opening under an elliptical arch. Inside the house is older furniture moved from elsewhere. |
| Swan Farmhouse; 53.88964°N 1.04391°W | — | Mid-18th century | The farmhouse is in pinkish-brown brick, with red rubbed brick dressings, quoins, a four-course floor band, a modillion eaves band, stone sills and a Welsh slate roof. There are two storeys and four bays. The doorway has a fanlight, the windows are sashes, and all the openings have flat arches of rubbed brick and red brick quoined surrounds. |
| Holly House; 53.89240°N 1.04883°W | — | Mid to late 18th century (probable) | The house is in pinkish-brown brick, with red brick dressings, a stepped floor band, a dentilled eaves band, and a pantile roof. There are two storeys and five bays, and a rear outshut. The central doorway has a fanlight, the windows are horizontally sliding sashes, and all the openings are under flat arches of red rubbed brick. |
