= St Nicholas' Church, Askham Bryan =

Grade I listed church in York, England

Coordinates: 53.929423°N 1.158071°W

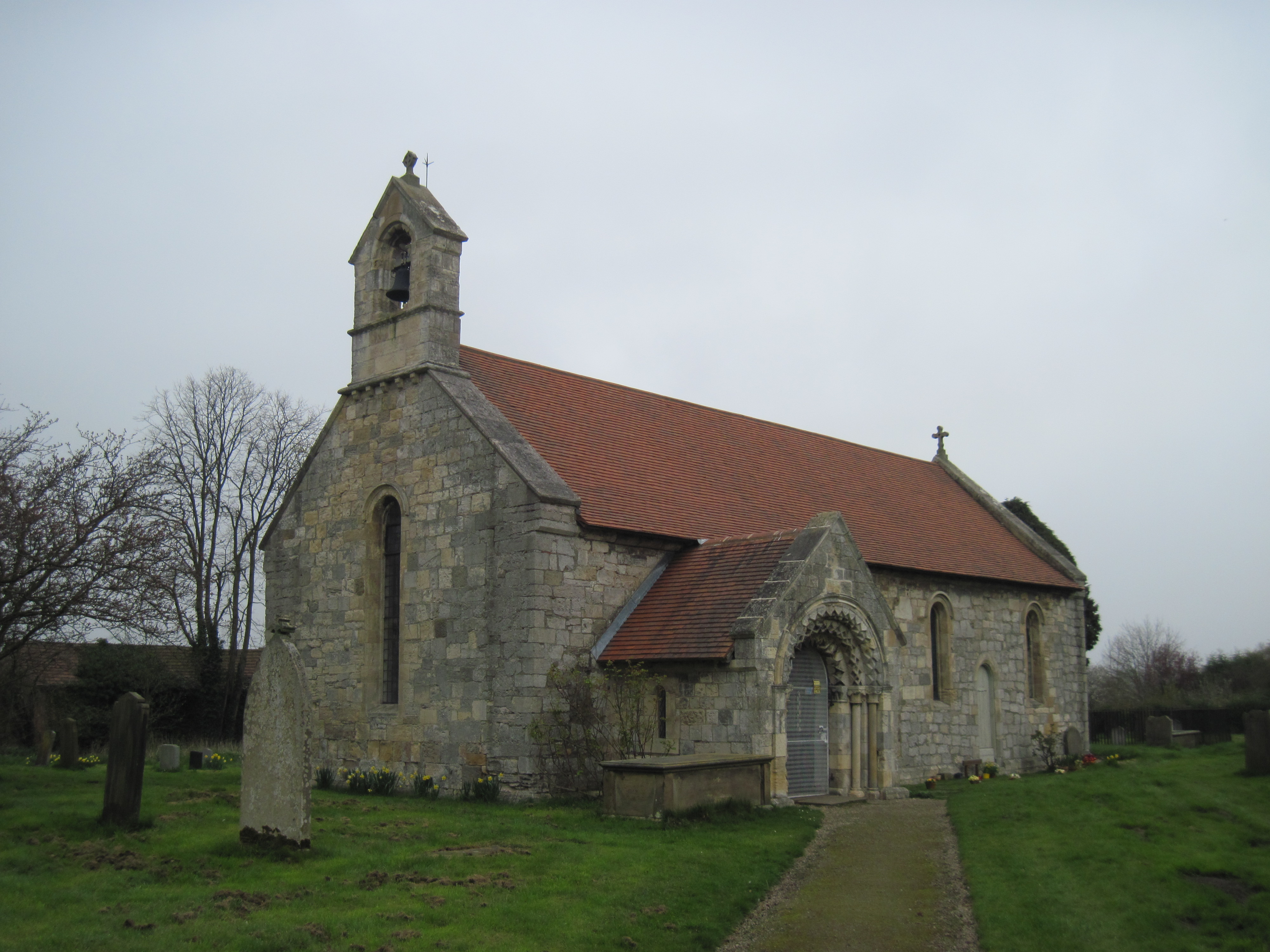
The church, in 2015

St Nicholas' Church is the parish church of Askham Bryan, near York in England, and is a Grade I listed building.

The church was constructed in the 12th-century, while the parish was in the possession of William de Tykhill. It is in the Norman style, constructed with a mixture of limestone ashlar, sandstone rubble, and some reused Roman bricks. The nave and chancel form a single space, while there is a porch to the south, and a vestry to the north. There is a single round-arched window at the west end, and three smaller similar windows in each of the north and south walls, and also in the east end, which has a round window above.

The roof is tiled, with a belfry on top, added in 1611, and a cross atop that. The porch has a triple round-headed archway, with zig-zag and small leaf mouldings. Inside there is a Jacobean pulpit and communion rail.

== See also ==
- Grade I listed buildings in the City of York
- Listed buildings in Askham Bryan
