= Rural West York =

Electoral division of the City of York, North Yorkshire, England

Coordinates: 53.95°N 1.17°W

- Location within North Yorkshire
- Population: 8,113 (Census 2021)
- OS grid reference: SE545506
- Unitary authority: City of York
- Ceremonial county: North Yorkshire
- Region: Yorkshire and the Humber
- Country: England
- Sovereign state: United Kingdom
- Post town: YORK
- Postcode district: YO23, YO26, YO30
- Dialling code: 01904
- Police: North Yorkshire
- Fire: North Yorkshire
- Ambulance: Yorkshire
- UK Parliament: York Outer

Rural West York is one of the outer wards of the unitary authority of City of York, England.

The ward is situated to the west of the city and includes the villages of Askham Bryan, Askham Richard, Hessay, Knapton, Nether Poppleton, Rufforth, Skelton and Upper Poppleton.

== Governance ==
As of the 2023 elections it is represented by Councillors Anne Hook and Emilie Knight who are both members of the local Liberal Democrats. It is a part of the UK Parliamentary Constituency of York Outer. Until January 2020 it also fell within the boundaries of the Yorkshire and the Humber European Parliament constituency.
