= Vale of York Academy =

Location
- Rawcliffe Drive, Clifton; York, North Yorkshire, YO30 6ZS; England
- Coordinates: 53.9761°N 1.1005°W

Information
- Type: Academy
- Motto: Always the best
- Established: As Canon Lee School in 1941 / As Vale of York Academy in 2015
- Local authority: City of York
- Trust: Heartwood Learning Trust
- Department for Education URN: 143864 Tables
- Ofsted: Reports
- Principal: Gill Mills
- Gender: Co-educational
- Age: 11 to 16
- Enrolment: 701 (August 2025)
- Colour: Maroon
- Website: https://voy.hslt.academy/

Vale of York Academy, previously called Canon Lee School, is a co-educational secondary school located in Clifton, York, England. The school is still often referred to locally as Canon Lee.

== History ==
Canon Lee was built in Clifton to serve the north-west suburbs of Rawcliffe, Clifton and Skelton. The doors opened in 1941. The first headmaster was Mr J Storey, and because of World War II the school was also used as a hospital and refuge shelter.

In 1972 the first extension was built to accommodate the large number of pupils and to bring the school up to date; this included a gym, science labs, and maths and textile classrooms. It was extended again at a cost of £4 million in 1999 to accommodate the influx of students when Queen Anne's School closed.

In 2012, an all-weather 3G football pitch was opened at the school by former England manager Steve McClaren.

The school was placed in special measures following an Ofsted inspection in 2015. In September 2016 it was announced that Canon Lee would be renamed as the Vale of York Academy as part of a series of changes that include becoming part of Hope Learning Trust, which later combined with Hull-based Sentamu Academy Learning Trust to form the Hope Sentamu Learning Trust, now called Heartwood Learning Trust.
