= Askham Bryan =

Village and civil parish in North Yorkshire, England

Coordinates: 53.929°N 1.159°W

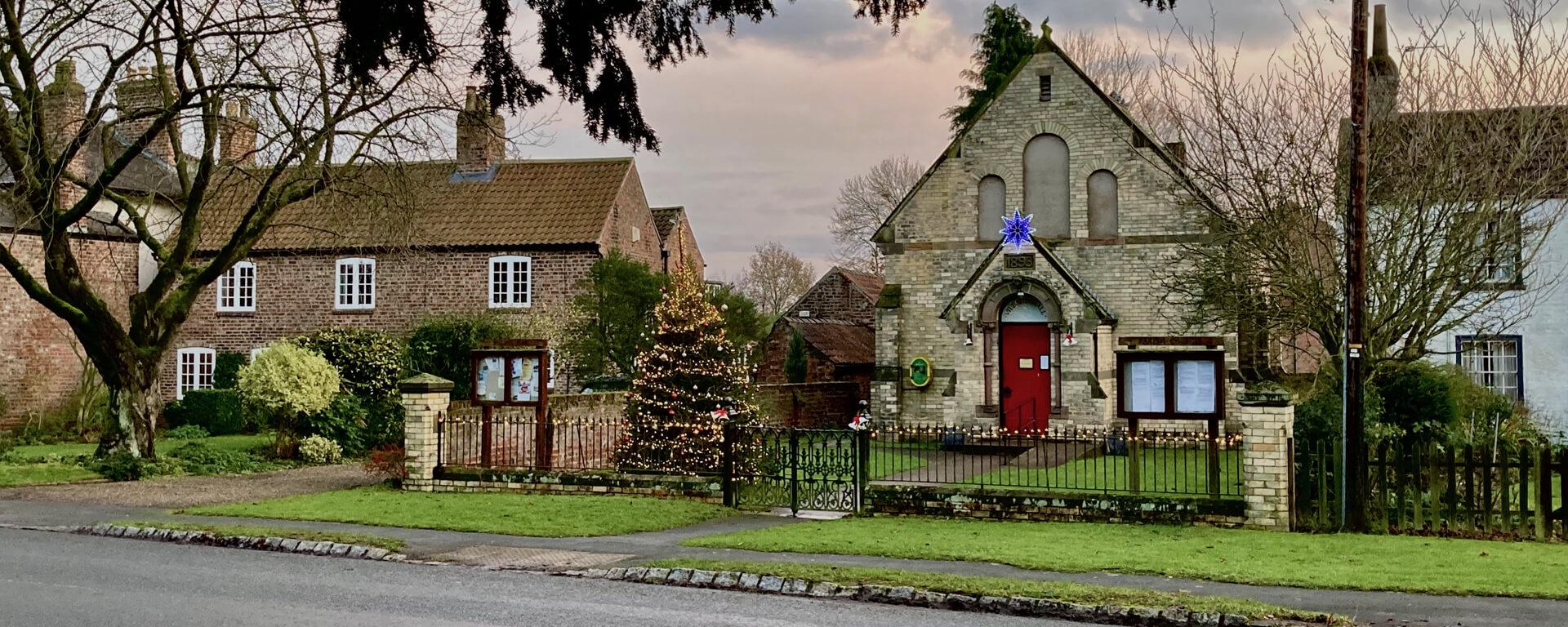
- Askham Bryan

- Location within North Yorkshire
- Population: 564 (2011)
- OS grid reference: SE553484
- Unitary authority: City of York
- Ceremonial county: North Yorkshire
- Region: Yorkshire and the Humber
- Country: England
- Sovereign state: United Kingdom
- Post town: YORK
- Postcode district: YO23
- Dialling code: 01904
- Police: North Yorkshire
- Fire: North Yorkshire
- Ambulance: Yorkshire
- UK Parliament: York Outer

Askham Bryan is a village and civil parish in the unitary authority area of City of York in the north of England. It is 6 miles (10 km) south-west of York, west of Bishopthorpe, and close to Askham Richard and Copmanthorpe. According to the 2001 census the parish had a population of 582, reducing to 564 at the 2011 census.

The village was historically part of the West Riding of Yorkshire until 1974. It was then a part of the district of Selby District in North Yorkshire from 1974 until 1996. Since 1996 it has been part of the City of York unitary authority.

Askham Bryan is mentioned in the Domesday Book. The name comes from Ascam or Ascha meaning "enclosure of ash tree". "Bryan" is Bryan FitzAlan. He and his heirs held the manor from the 12th century.

In the village is Askham Hall and nearby is Askham Bryan College of Agriculture. The village became a Conservation Area in 1980.

== History ==
The name of the village is derived partly from Bryan FitzAlan, who was granted the lands by the warden of Richmond Castle. Other notable local families to have been titled Lord of the manor for the village include the Mowbrays, Stapletons, and Greys. The village has sometimes been called East or Great Askham. Harry Croft Esq. was one of the last to be recorded as being Lord of the manor of Askham Bryan in 1890.

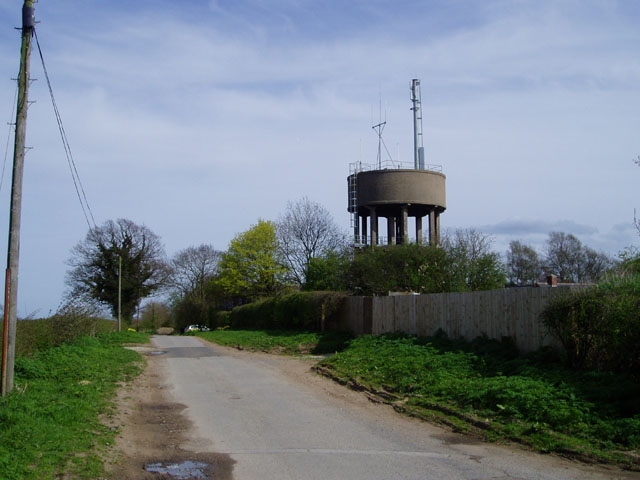
Water Tower on the Copmanthorpe link road

The villages of Askham Bryan and close by Askham Richard were once just one manor around the time of Edward the Confessor and belonged to Edwin, Earl of Mercia. When Edwin's lands were confiscated by William the Conqueror, the village was granted to Roger de Mowbray who then passed the manor to his friend, William de Tykhill, a former Warden of Foss Bridge. It eventually came into the hands of Bryan Fitzalan. During the reign of Edward III of England (reigned 1327- 1377), the manor passed from the Grey family via marriage to Sir John Deincourt. The last known hereditary Lord of the manor of Askham Bryan was Sir John Devede in the reign of Richard III of England (1483–1485).

== Governance ==
Askham Bryan lies in the Rural West York Ward of the City of York Unitary Authority. It is a part of the UK Parliamentary Constituency of York Outer.

== Demography ==
The population of the village has fluctuated from 332 in 1811 to 342 inhabitants in 1848 to about 300 inhabitants in 1890. The population in 2001 stood at 582. In 2011 the population had reduced to 564.

== Geography ==
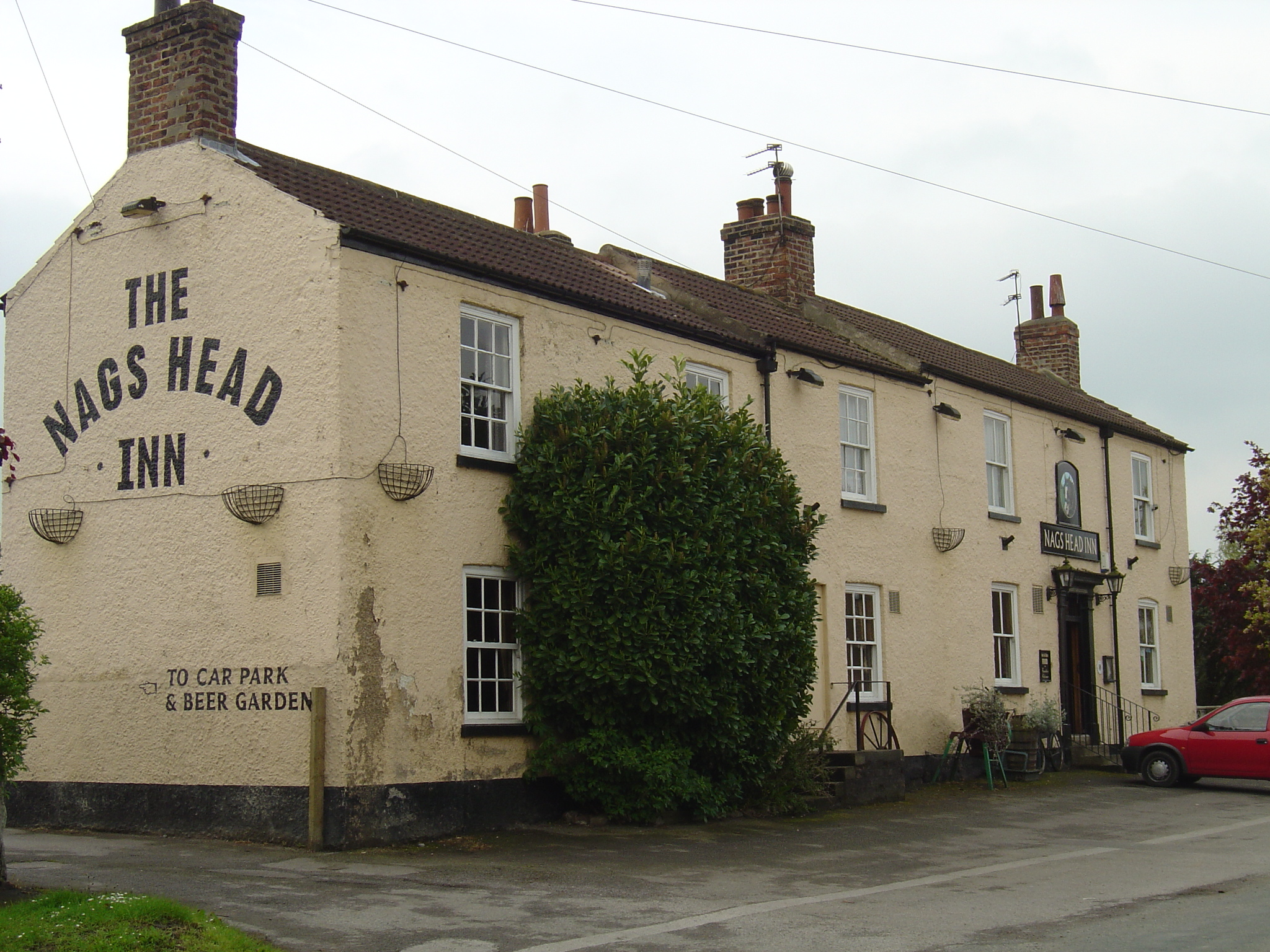
The Nag's Head Pub

The soil in and around the village is composed chiefly of gravel and clay. The village consists of two main streets, Main Street and Askham Fields Lane, which are surrounded by closes and cul-de-sacs. There is a small duck pond opposite the church which was believed to have been dug as part of a medieval drainage system. Several species of waterbirds, including mallard, moorhen and the Canada goose have been seen on and around the pond. The centre of the village is the oldest part of Askham Bryan but it also includes the 18th century Nag's Head pub, the Victorian Doctor's House and the old school, which was closed in the 1960s when it merged with St. Mary's C. of E. Primary School in Askham Richard. The Village Hall was built in 1836 and is a former Methodist Chapel.

=== Climate ===
Climate data for Askham Bryan 32m amsl (1991–2020)
Month	Jan	Feb	Mar	Apr	May	Jun	Jul	Aug	Sep	Oct	Nov	Dec	Year
Mean daily maximum °C (°F)	7.4 (45.3)	8.1 (46.6)	10.9 (51.6)	13.8 (56.8)	17.1 (62.8)	20.0 (68.0)	21.6 (70.9)	21.8 (71.2)	18.9 (66.0)	14.4 (57.9)	10.8 (51.4)	7.4 (45.3)	14.4 (57.8)
Daily mean °C (°F)	4.6 (40.3)	4.7 (40.5)	6.7 (44.1)	9.1 (48.4)	12.3 (54.1)	15.2 (59.4)	16.8 (62.2)	17.2 (63.0)	14.4 (57.9)	11.0 (51.8)	7.6 (45.7)	4.4 (39.9)	10.3 (50.6)
Mean daily minimum °C (°F)	1.7 (35.1)	1.2 (34.2)	2.5 (36.5)	4.4 (39.9)	7.4 (45.3)	10.3 (50.5)	12.1 (53.8)	12.5 (54.5)	9.8 (49.6)	7.6 (45.7)	4.3 (39.7)	1.4 (34.5)	6.3 (43.3)
Average rainfall mm (inches)	46.6 (1.83)	52.0 (2.05)	28.7 (1.13)	59.6 (2.35)	41.1 (1.62)	55.2 (2.17)	62.2 (2.45)	78.6 (3.09)	42.4 (1.67)	76.4 (3.01)	55.6 (2.19)	52.3 (2.06)	650.7 (25.62)
Average rainy days (≥ 1.0 mm)	11.0	10.6	7.4	10.6	9.0	9.0	9.8	10.8	7.8	13.2	10.0	9.0	118.2
Source: Meteoclimat

== Economy ==
The village is mainly a commuter village for nearby cities, though there is still some agriculture. The nearby Askham Bryan College of Agriculture and Horticulture provides some local employment.

== Transport ==
York Pullman buses serve Askham Bryan 2/3 times a day (Monday-Saturday) in each direction as part of route 37 between York and Tadcaster.

== Education ==
The old Victorian school is the first building encountered when entering the village from the east. Built in 1856 by a charitable body known as the "Friends and Guardians of the Poor of the Village of Askham Bryan", it was later adopted by the Church of England. In 1862, the school had 69 children, later dwindling to 12 in 1967. In 1972, after 115 years as a school, the Askham Bryan Church of England school was sold to become a private residence.

As of 2010, Primary Education is catered for at St Mary's Church of England Voluntary Community School in nearby Askham Richard. For secondary education, the village is in the catchment area of York High School on Cornlands Road in nearby Acomb, though most pupils choose to attend Tadcaster Grammar School in whose catchment area it remains despite the village falling within the City of York boundaries. There is a daily bus service available to the Grammar School.

Nearby is Askham Bryan College of Agriculture and Horticulture. The college was originally known as the Yorkshire Institute of Agriculture, which opened in 1948. It became Askham Bryan College of Agriculture and Horticulture in 1967. It now includes equine management, animal management, land management, business, food production, engineering and bioscience. The college lay on coach transport to many Yorkshire destinations, including Northallerton, for students.

== Sports ==
Askham Bryan Cricket Club fondly called as ABCC, is cricket club based in Askham Bryan, York. The Club have two teams in the York Vale league, first XI in division 1 and the second XI in division 4. Askham Bryan Cricket Club has been competing in one form or another for roughly 100 years.

== Religion ==
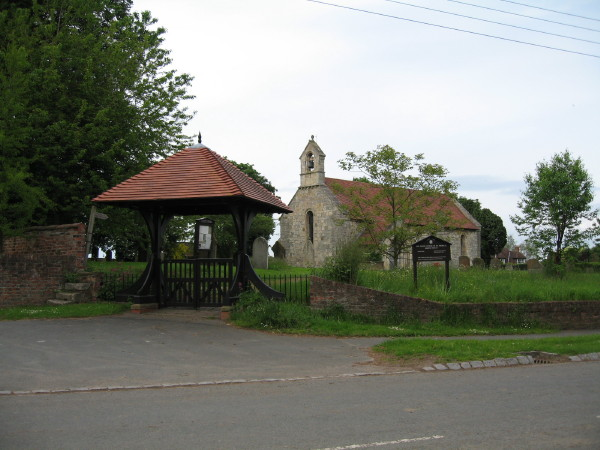
St Nicholas Church

The parish church of St Nicholas can be found near the centre of the village and dates back to the 11th century and is of an original Norman design though with a working 17th century bell tower. The church is a Grade I listed building and the war memorial in the churchyard is Grade II listed.

== See also ==
- Listed buildings in Askham Bryan
