= Earswick =

Village and civil parish in North Yorkshire, England

Coordinates: 54.00842°N 1.05653°W

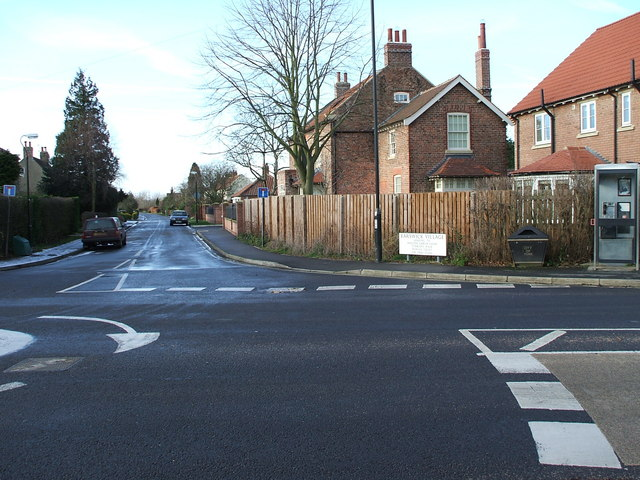
- Main street, Earswick

- Location within North Yorkshire
- Population: 876 (2011)
- OS grid reference: SE619573
- Civil parish: Earswick
- Unitary authority: City of York
- Ceremonial county: North Yorkshire
- Region: Yorkshire and the Humber
- Country: England
- Sovereign state: United Kingdom
- Post town: YORK
- Postcode district: YO32
- Police: North Yorkshire
- Fire: North Yorkshire
- Ambulance: Yorkshire
- UK Parliament: York Outer

Earswick is a village and civil parish in the unitary authority of the City of York in North Yorkshire, England. It lies between Huntington and Strensall about 4 miles (6.4 km) north of York.

According to the 2001 census the parish had a population of 819, increasing to 876 at the 2011 Census.

The village was historically part of the North Riding of Yorkshire until 1974. It was then a part of the district of Ryedale in North Yorkshire from 1974 until 1996. Since 1996 it has been part of the City of York unitary authority.

The name Earswick derives from the Old English Aethelricswīc meaning 'Aethelric's trading settlement'.
