= Deighton, York =

Village and civil parish in North Yorkshire, England

Coordinates: 53.890°N 1.045°W

Deighton
- Location within North Yorkshire
- Population: 291 (2011 census)
- OS grid reference: SE628441
- Civil parish: Deighton
- Unitary authority: City of York
- Ceremonial county: North Yorkshire
- Region: Yorkshire and the Humber
- Country: England
- Sovereign state: United Kingdom
- Post town: YORK
- Postcode district: YO19
- Police: North Yorkshire
- Fire: North Yorkshire
- Ambulance: Yorkshire

Deighton is a village and civil parish in the unitary authority of the City of York, North Yorkshire, England. The population of the civil parish as of the 2011 census was 291. It lies on the A19 about five miles south of York. According to the 2001 census the parish had a population of 308.

The village was historically part of the East Riding of Yorkshire until 1974. It was then a part of the Selby District in North Yorkshire from 1974 until 1996. Since 1996 it has been part of the City of York unitary authority.

The parish also includes most of the hamlet of Crockey Hill.

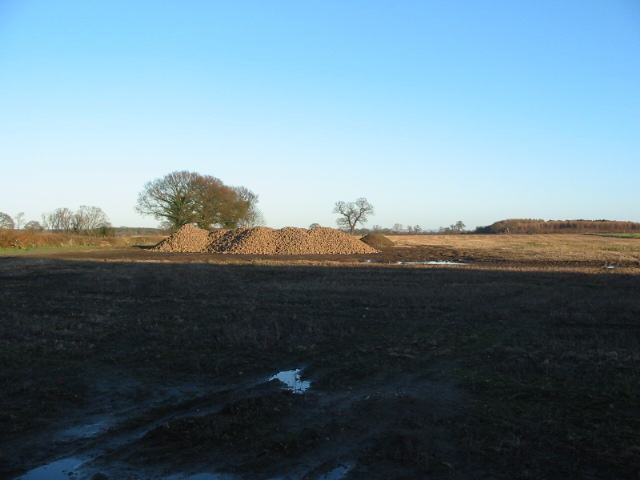
Piles of harvested sugar beet at Swan Farm by Deighton

The name Deighton comes from Old English and means farmstead surrounded by a ditch.

== Governance ==
The parish is currently part of Wheldrake Ward in the City of York. As of 2023 it is represented by Cllr Christian Vassie from the local Liberal Democrats.

== See also ==
- Listed buildings in Deighton, York
