= Askham Richard =

Village and civil parish in North Yorkshire, England

Coordinates: 53.925°N 1.185°W

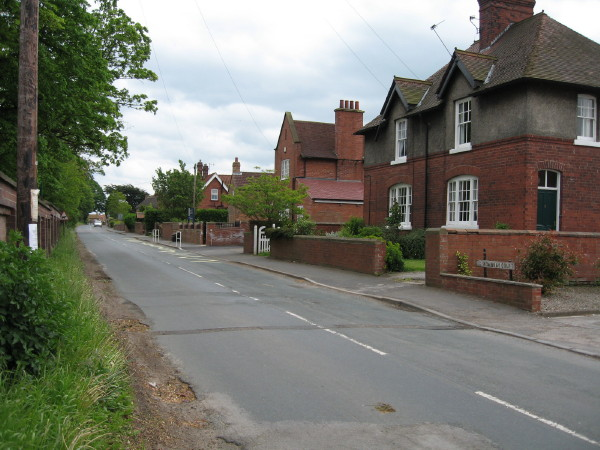
- Askham Richard

- Location within North Yorkshire
- Population: 351 (2011)
- OS grid reference: SE536480
- Unitary authority: City of York
- Ceremonial county: North Yorkshire
- Region: Yorkshire and the Humber
- Country: England
- Sovereign state: United Kingdom
- Post town: YORK
- Postcode district: YO23
- Dialling code: 01904
- Police: North Yorkshire
- Fire: North Yorkshire
- Ambulance: Yorkshire
- UK Parliament: York Outer

Askham Richard is a village and civil parish in the unitary authority of City of York in the north of England, 6.5 miles (10.5 km) south-west of York, close to Copmanthorpe, Bilbrough and Askham Bryan. The population of the civil parish at the 2011 census was 351. The village became a Conservation Area in 1975. Nearby is Askham Bryan College of Agriculture.

The village was historically part of the West Riding of Yorkshire until 1974. It was then a part of the district of Selby District in North Yorkshire from 1974 until 1996. Since 1996 it has been part of the City of York unitary authority.

== History ==
The village is mentioned in the Domesday Book. The name comes from ascam or ascha meaning "enclosure of ash-tree". It has been also known as "Little" or "West" Askham". The "Richard" in the village name is reputed to be that of Richard, 1st Earl of Cornwall.

Before the Conquest the villages of Askham Richard and nearby Askham Bryan were one manor belonging to Edwin, Earl of Mercia. When Edwin's lands were confiscated by William the Conqueror, the village was granted to Roger de Mowbray who then passed the Manor to his friend, William de Tykhill, a former Warden of Foss Bridge.

== Governance ==
Askham Richard lies in the Rural West York Ward of the City of York Unitary Authority. It is a part of the UK Parliamentary Constituency of York Outer.

== Demography ==
In 1848, parish records show the population as 232. In 1881, the National Census showed the population as 226. According to the 2001 census the parish had a population of 273. The 2011 census recorded the population as 351.

== Geography ==
The village consists of one main street, where the main village green and duck pond are located, and a couple of small lanes. The soil consists of gravel and clay.

The village is 1.7 miles west of Askham Bryan, 2.3 miles south of Rufforth, 1.5 miles north-east of Bilbrough.

== Economy ==
Within the village is Her Majesty's Prison Askham Grange. Also in the village is the Rose and Crown pub. There are three farms, but the remainder are dwellings. The nearby Askham Bryan College of Agriculture and Horticulture provides some local employment.

== Transport ==
York Pullman serves the village 2/3 times a day (Monday-Saturday) in each direction on service 37 which runs between Tadcaster to York.

== Education ==
Primary education is catered for at St. Mary Church of England primary school. Nearby is Askham Bryan College of Agriculture and Horticulture. The college was originally known as the Yorkshire Institute of Agriculture, which opened in 1948. It became Askham Bryan College of Agriculture and Horticulture 19 years later. It now includes equine management, animal management, land management, business, food production, engineering and bioscience.

== Religious sites ==
St Mary's Church is Grade II* listed. There is record of a church here from 1086 but most of the existing building dates from 1887, a simple Victorian design with no tower (it has a bellcote). The rebuilding however retained some fabric of the earlier church, notably the porch doorway (much restored), with two orders of colonettes and zig-zag pattern across the roll moulding. This fits with a late 11th century date for the original church. It is one of a local group of churches with Norman doorways (see Ainsty). At nearby St Nicholas Askham Bryan the door has similar motifs (leaves in the teeth of the zigzags) and may well have been made by the same hands. The doorway to the church, as opposed to the porch, is less grand but also late C11th, and there is an unusually plain west doorway of comparable age.

== Notable people ==
Mary Flora Bell lived and worked here for a while. She also spent some time at the HM Prison Askham Grange.

== See also ==
- Listed buildings in Askham Richard

== Gallery ==
Views of Askham Richard
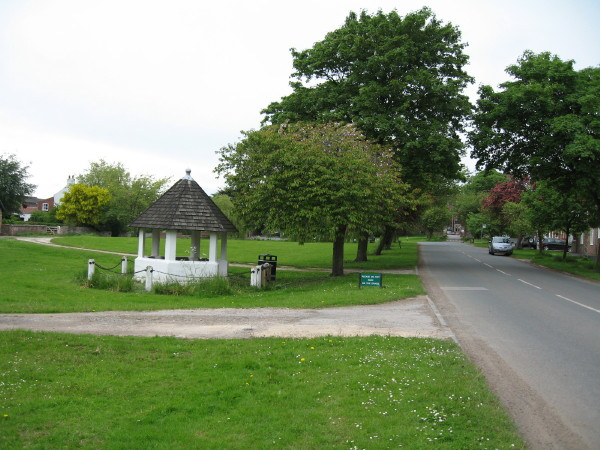
Askham Richard Village Centre

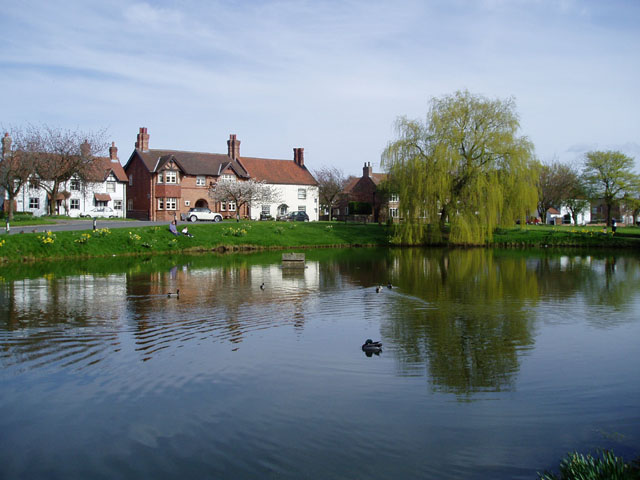
Askham Richard village pond

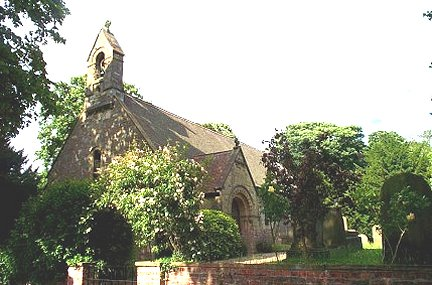
Askham Richard, St Mary's Church; the cricketer Archibald Fargus was vicar here in 1913.

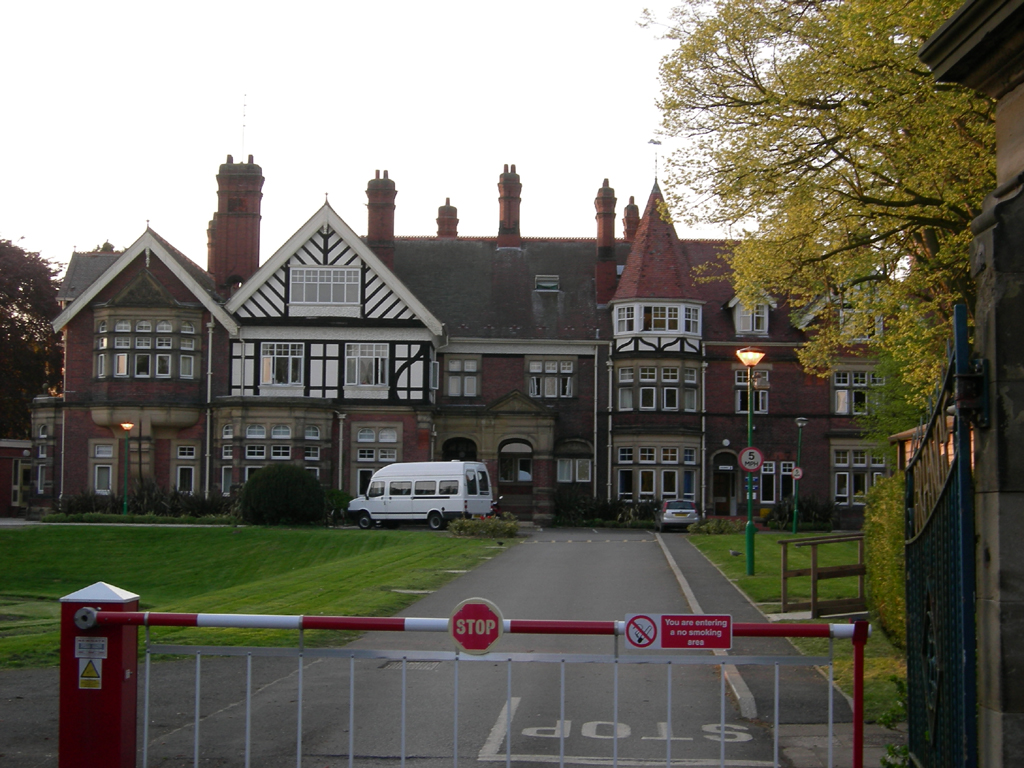
H.M. Prison Askham Grange
