= Upper Poppleton =

Village and civil parish in North Yorkshire, England

Coordinates: 53.980°N 1.153°W

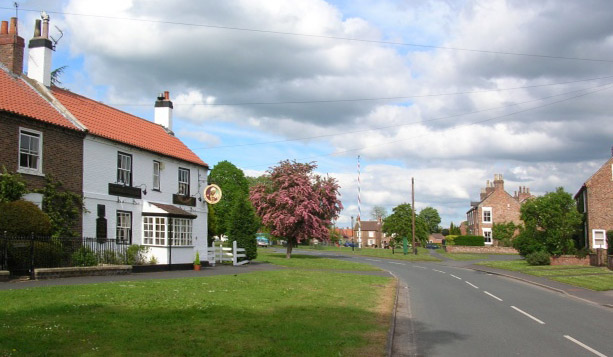
- The pub and maypole in Upper Poppleton

- Location within North Yorkshire
- Population: 1,997 (2011 census)
- OS grid reference: SE5554
  - London: 175 mi (282 km) SSE
- Civil parish: Upper Poppleton
- Unitary authority: City of York
- Ceremonial county: North Yorkshire
- Region: Yorkshire and the Humber
- Country: England
- Sovereign state: United Kingdom
- Post town: YORK
- Postcode district: YO26
- Dialling code: 01904
- Police: North Yorkshire
- Fire: North Yorkshire
- Ambulance: Yorkshire
- UK Parliament: York Outer

Upper Poppleton is a village and civil parish in the unitary authority of the City of York in North Yorkshire, England. It is situated by the west bank of the River Ouse adjacent to Nether Poppleton, and west of York close to the A59 from York to Harrogate. The village is served by Poppleton railway station on the Harrogate Line. According to the 2001 census, the parish had a population of 1,961, increasing to 1,997 at the 2011 Census. Before 1996, it was part of the Borough of Harrogate.

The name is derived from popel (pebble) and tun (hamlet, farm) and means "Pebble Farm" because of the gravel bed upon which the village was built. Upper Poppleton has been referred to as "Land Poppleton" and the neighbouring village of Nether Poppleton as "Water Poppleton" indicating their position relative to the river.

The village is mentioned in the Domesday Book and the Anglo-Saxon Chronicles. It became a Conservation Area in 1993.

== History ==
In 972, the village was recorded in the Anglo-Saxon Chronicles as "Popeltun" and in the Domesday Book as "Popeltune". The villages and lands were given by Osbert De Arches to the Abbot of St Mary's in York. It was, therefore, under the ecclesiastical rule of the Parish of St Mary-Bishophill Junior.

During the reign of Richard II the village was the scene of the murder of a Mayor of York.

In 1644 the 25,000 strong Scottish and Parliament Armies, led by the Earl of Manchester, laid siege to the city of York. To facilitate communications, they built a "Bridge of Boats" at Poppleton. This bridge was eventually taken by Prince Rupert and his Royalist Forces, but he subsequently lost the battle at Marston Moor.

The village benefitted from the growth in the railways in the 19th century, when the York, Knaresborough and Harrogate Railway routed their line through Poppleton and erected a station.

The village was historically part of the West Riding of Yorkshire until 1974. It was then a part of the Borough of Harrogate in North Yorkshire from 1974 until 1996. Since 1996 it has been part of the City of York unitary authority.

== Governance ==
Upper Poppleton lies within the Rural West York ward of the City of York unitary authority. It is a part of the UK Parliamentary Constituency of York Outer.

Locally there is a Parish Council with eight council members.

== Economy ==
The Poppletons were formerly agricultural settlements with many farms, but the modern village is mostly a dormitory for commuters to the nearby towns and cities. It has benefited from its good road and rail links. The village has local retail facilities, including a post office, and some small enterprises.

== Demography ==
In the 19th century the population varied between 284 and 346. The census of 2001 recorded the population as 1,961.

== Community ==
There are two allotment sites in the village of Upper Poppleton. One is located at the end of Beech Grove and the other is in Main Street next to the Library. There are eight allotments on the Beech Grove Allotments, each approximately 300 square metres. The land is owned by the Parish Council. Main Street Allotments have seven plots.

There is a Youth Club and Scout Troop in the village.

== Education ==
In 1797, local ironmonger John Dodsworth founded a Church of England School. This was converted into accommodation for the School Master when a new building was built in 1850. As of 2010 Poppleton Ousebank Primary provides primary education for both Poppletons.

For secondary education, the village is in the catchment area of York High School on Cornlands Road in nearby Acomb, though the nearest secondary school is Manor CE on Millfield Lane. Manor is a Church of England School and has its own admissions policy separate from the local City Council. It was originally built in 1813 at Kings Manor and has moved several times before being sited in Millfield Lane.

== Transport ==
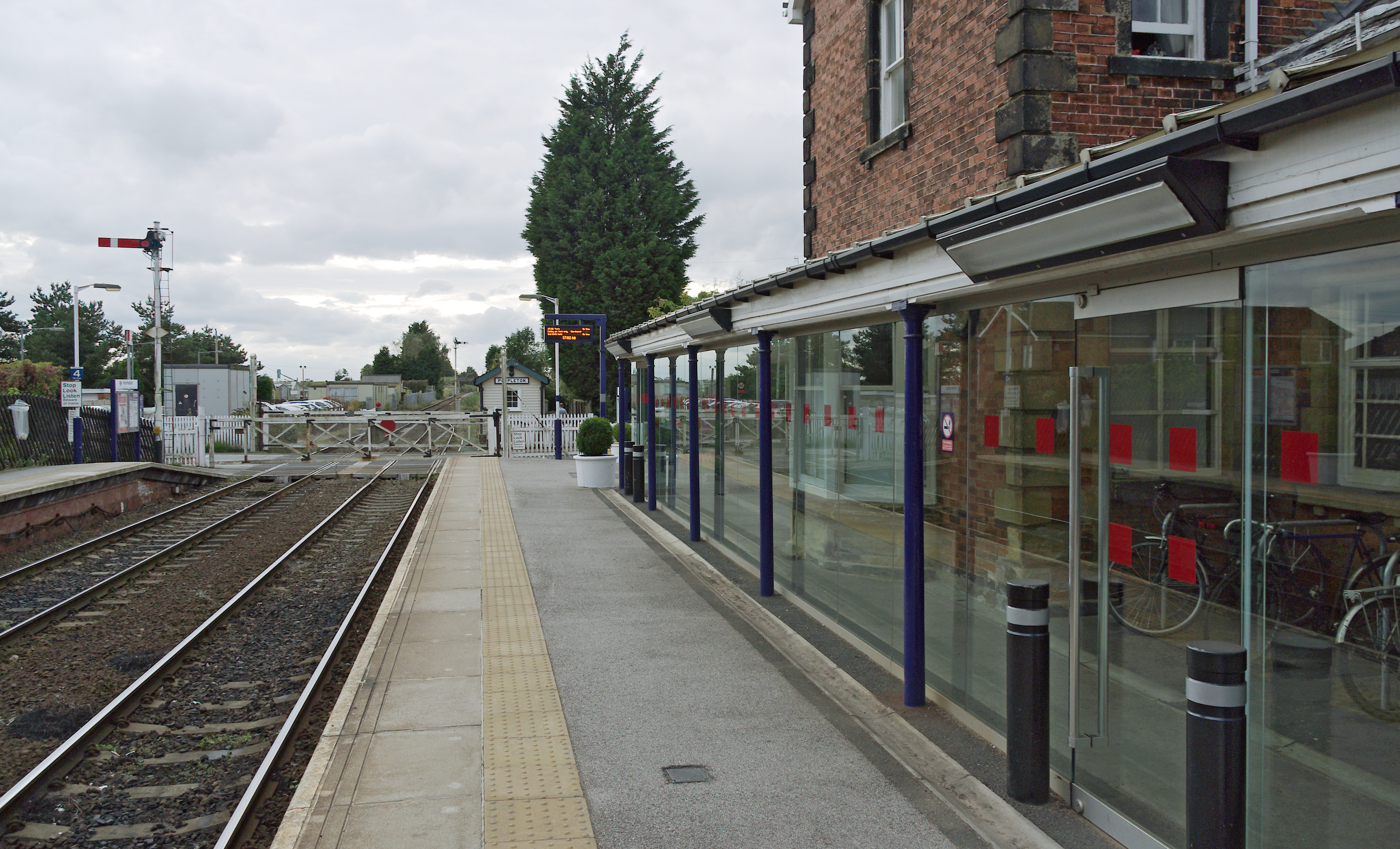
Poppleton railway station

East Yorkshire (bus company) buses run past the village as part of the York to Ripon route.

First York buses operate in the village as part of the Nether Poppleton route to York/Stamford Bridge.

A Park and Ride (Poppleton Bar) was constructed by the A59 in 2015, with Park and Ride buses (route 59) running from Poppleton to York centre, generally every fifteen minutes. In 2020 the site was used as a drive-through COVID-19 testing centre. This has now been reopened as a park and ride.

Northern Rail operates a stopping service on the line between York and Leeds via Harrogate. Poppleton station is the first station after York. Trains from Leeds via Harrogate are billed with Poppleton as the final destination on the boards at Leeds but the train will continue to York.

== Religion ==
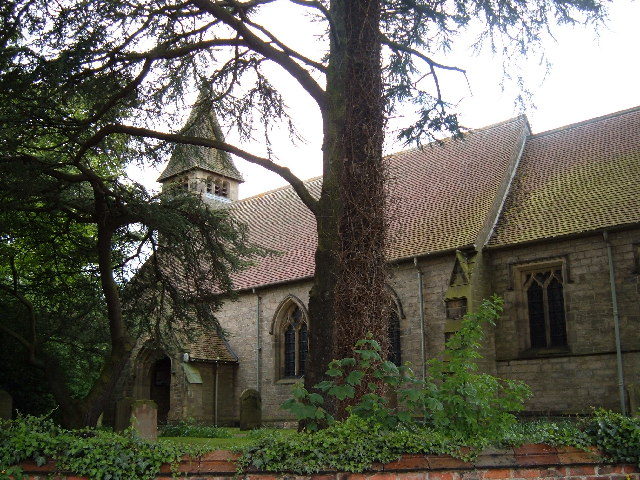
All Saints Church

The old Norman 'Chapel of All Hallows' in Upper Poppleton was demolished in 1890 to make way for the Victorian All Saints' Church. The 'new' church was designed by Hodgson Fowler of Durham.

In 1866, the two Poppleton Parishes were united to form the Parish of Nether Poppleton with Upper Poppleton. All Saints' Church is situated on The Green in Upper Poppleton.

The present Methodist Chapel on the Green replaced two previous buildings on the site built in 1817 and 1819 respectively.

== Sports ==
Poppleton United 1st XI play in York Football League Premier Division, as of 2010, and play next to the Community Centre on Main Street. The 2nd XI play in Reserve Division C. Poppleton Tigers Junior Football Club is located in Nether Poppleton, but serves both villages.

There is a Lawn Tennis Club with artificial and all weather courts in Main Street. As of 2010 the Men's 1st and second team play in Division One of the Tyke Petroleum Tennis League and the 3rd team play in Division Six. The Ladies 1st team also compete in the Ladies section of the same League, with the 1st team playing in Division One, the 2nd team in Division Three and the 3rd team in Division Three as of 2010. They also enter five teams in the Mixed Section in Divisions One, Two, Six Eight and Eleven.
