= Wigginton, North Yorkshire =

Village and civil parish in North Yorkshire, England

Coordinates: 54.0187°N 1.0936°W

Wigginton
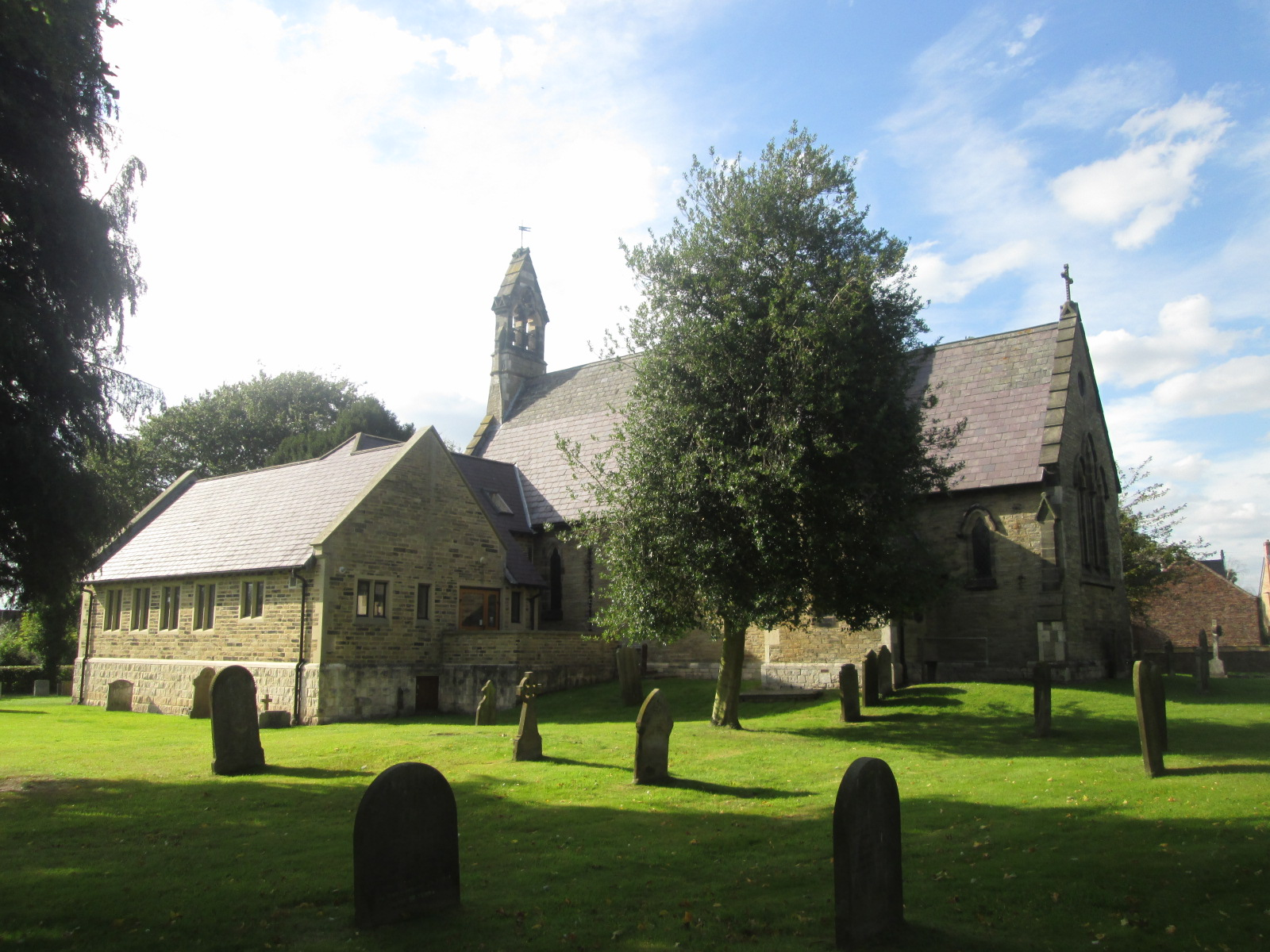
- St Nicholas Church

- Location within North Yorkshire
- Population: 3,610 (2011)
- OS grid reference: SE594585
- Civil parish: Wigginton
- Unitary authority: City of York
- Ceremonial county: North Yorkshire
- Region: Yorkshire and the Humber
- Country: England
- Sovereign state: United Kingdom
- Post town: YORK
- Postcode district: YO32
- Police: North Yorkshire
- Fire: North Yorkshire
- Ambulance: Yorkshire
- UK Parliament: York Outer

Wigginton is a village and civil parish in the unitary authority of the City of York in North Yorkshire, England. It is situated 4 miles (6.4 km) north of York. According to the 2001 census the parish had a population of 3,714, reducing to 3,610 at the 2011 Census.

The village was historically part of the North Riding of Yorkshire until 1974. It was then a part of the district of Ryedale in North Yorkshire from 1974 until 1996. Since 1996 it has been part of the City of York unitary authority.

Wigginton is bordered on the east by the township of Haxby, the A1237 York Outer ring Road to the south, the B1363 to the west and open farmland to the north.

== History ==
The village name derives from the Old English pre-7th century personal name "Wicga", meaning "a beetle", plus the Old English suffix, "-tun", meaning a "settlement or enclosure, hence "Wigca's settlement".

The village was named in the Domesday Book and noted as belonging to the cathedral church of St Peter in York. The name of the village has been recorded as Wichestun in the 11th century and Wygynton in the 13th century. The first recorded owners of the manor were the Askebys, who may have been connected with the neighbouring village of Haxby, and of Roger de Haxbey, who owned nearby land during the reign of Edward I. Hugh de Moresby, Lord of Moresby in Cumberland, was in possession of the manor of Wigginton in 1337. Through inheritance and marriage the manor passed to Anne Pickering and her second husband, Sir Henry Knyvett. She sold the manor with others in 1541 to Henry VIII, but his heir, Edward VI, granted them back to Anne and Henry in 1548.

== Governance ==
Wigginton Parish Council

Type
- Type: Parish council

Leadership
- Chairman: John Gates
- Clerk: Marie Harrison
- Seats: 10 Councillors

Elections
- Voting system: Plurality-at-large
- Last election: 7 May 2019
- Next election: 2 May 2023

Website
- www.wiggintonparishcouncil.gov.uk

Wigginton Parish Council

Haxby and Wigginton Ward Committee (City of York Council)

The village lies within the Haxby and Wigginton Ward of the City of York Council (a Unitary Authority). Haxby and Wigginton Ward is represented by three City of York Council Members, and these three Members constitute the local Ward Committee; which has a small budget for local highways improvements and grants for local organisations. Elections to the City Council are held every four years. As of May 2019 Haxby and Wigginton Ward is represented by Councillors Ian Cuthbertson, Andrew Hollyer and Edward Pearson, all of whom are members of the Liberal Democrat Party.

City of York Council is responsible for a number of statutory local services, including adult social care, children and education, waste services such as household waste and recycling bin collections, transport and highways, library services etc.

York Outer Member of Parliament

Wigginton was in the Vale of York parliamentary constituency until the 2010 general election when it was transferred to the newly created constituency of York Outer. In that election the Conservative Party candidate, Julian Sturdy, was elected having received 43% of the vote and a majority of 3,688 over the Liberal Democrat candidate. Sturdy has retained the seat in subsequent elections in 2015, 2017, and 2019.

== Demography ==
In 1872 the population was recorded as 349. In the National Census of 1881 the population had risen to 399. According to the 2001 census the parish had a population of 3,714.

== Geography ==
The village sits on flat ground consisting mostly of clay with soil that is sand and alluvium. To the west of the village is Westfield Beck. The nearby town of Haxby now merges with Wigginton though the old Parish Boundary map still shows the dividing line. This runs east to west along the back of the houses on Wheatfield Drive on its southern edge as far as Barley Drive. Here it turns northward cutting across Greenshaw Drive until it reaches the road known The Village. The boundary follows this road until it turns west. The boundary at this point continues northward cutting across Windsor Drive near Ripley Grove and then out into the countryside.

== Economy ==
Wigginton has expanded from a mainly agricultural origin to become mostly a commuter village for York. Wigginton has a number of businesses, a garden centre, two farm shops, hairdressers and chiropodists, a nursing home, a village store and three public houses. Also a small arcade of shops are on Sutton Road.

== Transport ==
As of 2019 First York operate a bus service in the village as part of the Chapelfields to Wigginton route. The Acomb Park to Haxby route is operated by ConneXionsbuses. Yorkshire Coastliner operate the Rawcliffe to Monks Cross and Osbaldwick bus service which stops in the village. Reliance Motor Services operate a service that stops in the village on the B1363 as part of its York to Easingwold route.

== Education ==
Primary education is catered for at Wigginton Primary School. As of 2018, the village is within the catchment area of Joseph Rowntree Secondary School.

== Religious sites ==
The present parish church is dedicated to St Nicholas. The first specific mention of a church building was in 1424 and of a chapel at Wigginton in the middle of the 13th century. The present church of St Nicholas was rebuilt in 1860, and re-dedicated in 2008. Currently united with nearby St Marys of Haxby, it is also known under the collective title of 'St Mary and St Nicholas'.

== Sport ==
As of 2010, Wigginton Grasshoppers F.C.82 football club 1st XI play in the York and District Premier Division and the Reserve Team play in the Reserve Division A. They also provide teams across the full age range to various local weekend leagues.

The village is also the home of Wigginton Squash and Racketball Club, a 3 court Squash & Racketball Club. The club has been men's Yorkshire League Champions on 3 occasions, and supports the local York & District Squash leagues with 6 men's & 2 ladies teams. Juniors also play league squash for the club. The club currently have one Yorkshire League team.

== Bibliography ==
A Hundred Years at Sunnyside (in the village of Wigginton near York), written by John Edwin Gates and published by blurb.com, is an account of life in Wigginton from 1912 to 2011. Stephen Lewis of the York Press wrote: "A Hundred Years at Sunnyside gives some delightful glimpses into the life of a York Butcher 100 years ago... an affectionate tribute to the family and the childhood home John left behind in York, as well as to a way of life sadly now long vanished".

== Gallery ==
Views of Wigginton
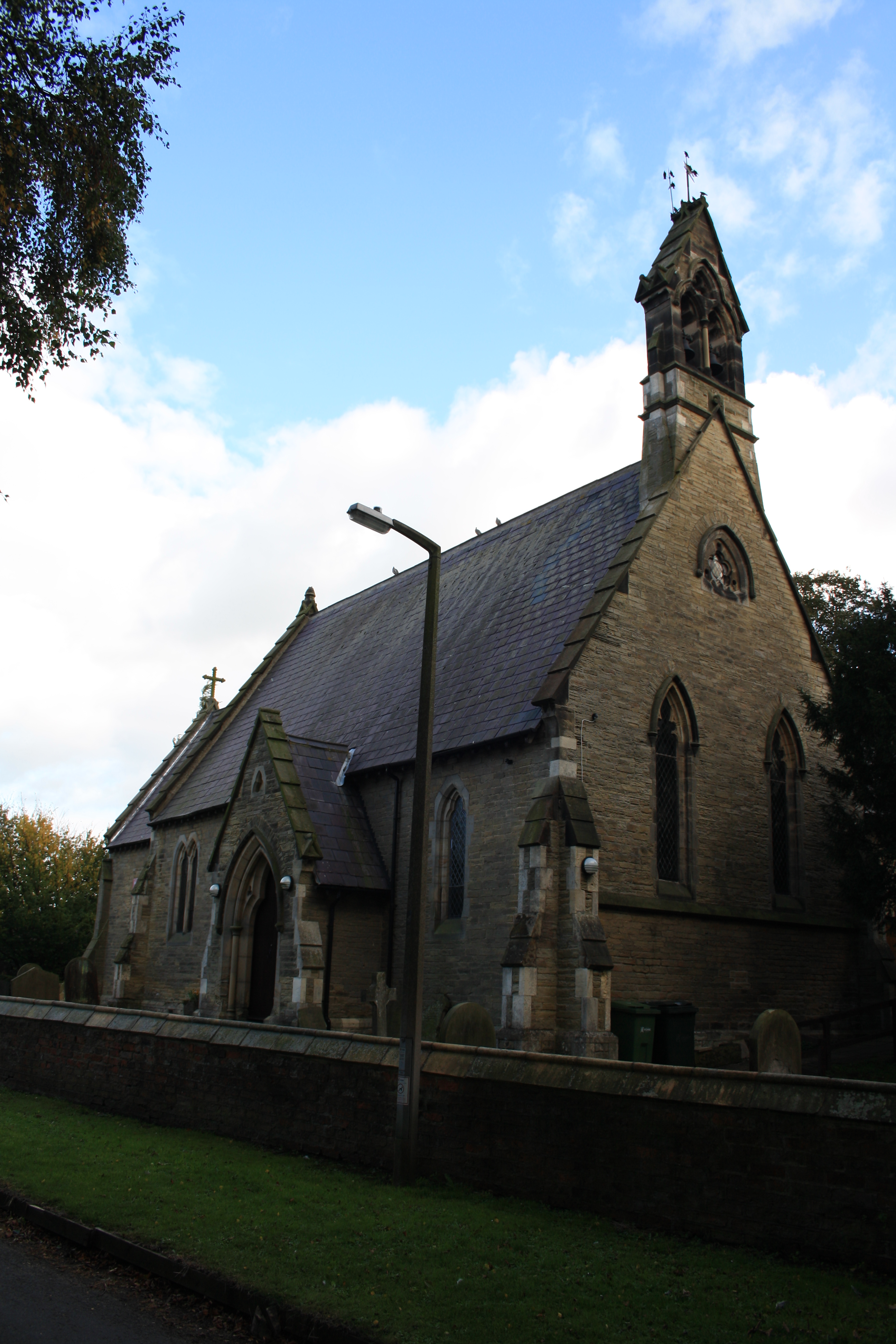
St Nicholas church

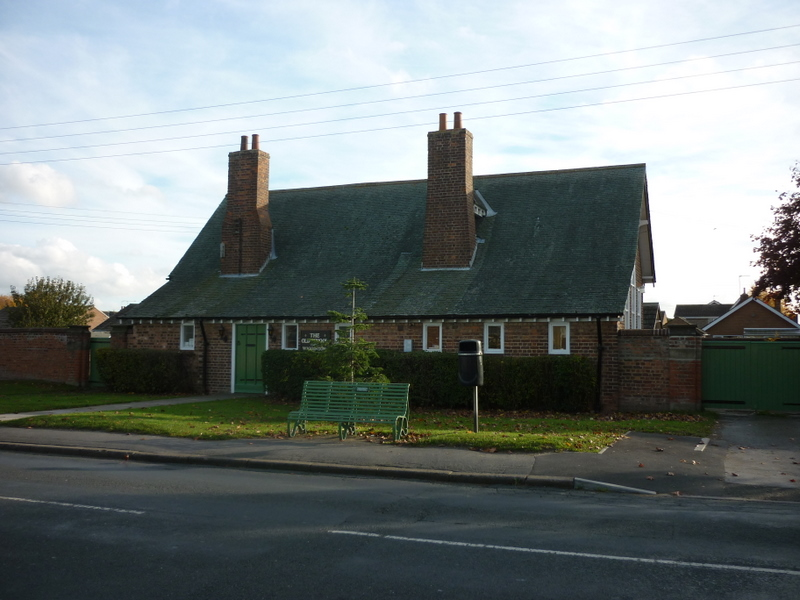
Wigginton Old School building

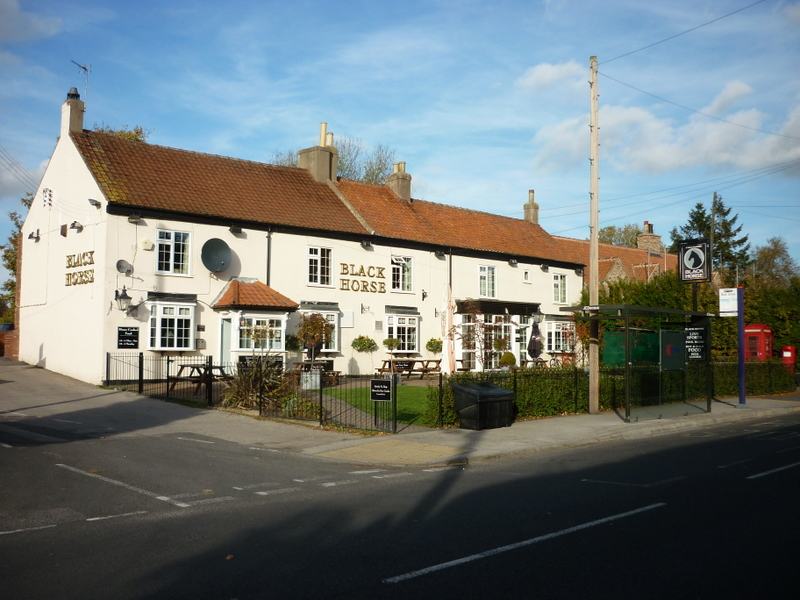
Wigginton Black Horse public house

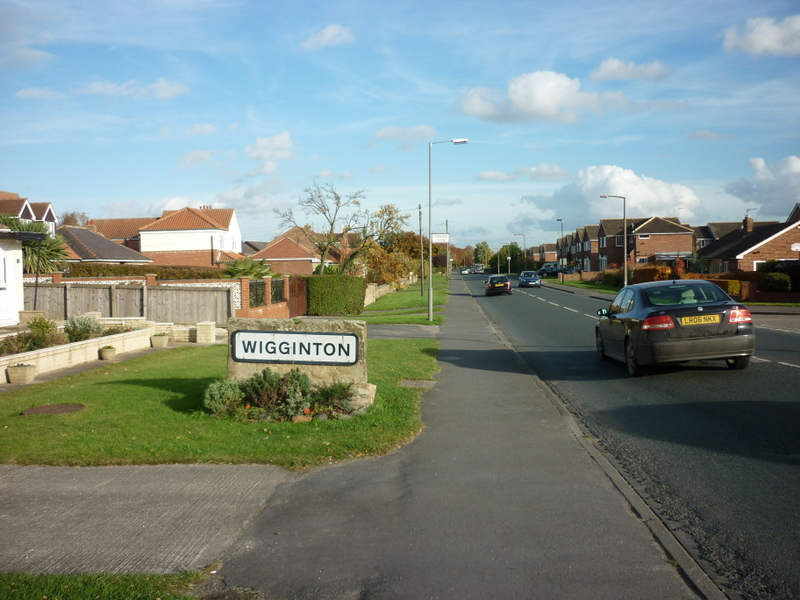
Wigginton
