= Heworth Without =

Civil parish and ward in the City of York, North Yorkshire, England

Coordinates: 53.988°N 1.0399°W

Heworth Without is a civil parish and a ward in the City of York district, in the ceremonial county of North Yorkshire, England. Its boundary has changed over time. The ward is not coterminous with Heworth Without parish. While it consists today largely of those parts of Heworth that lay beyond the (pre-1996) city boundary, some areas such as Straylands Grove are within Heworth Without ward, but were also within the old city boundaries.

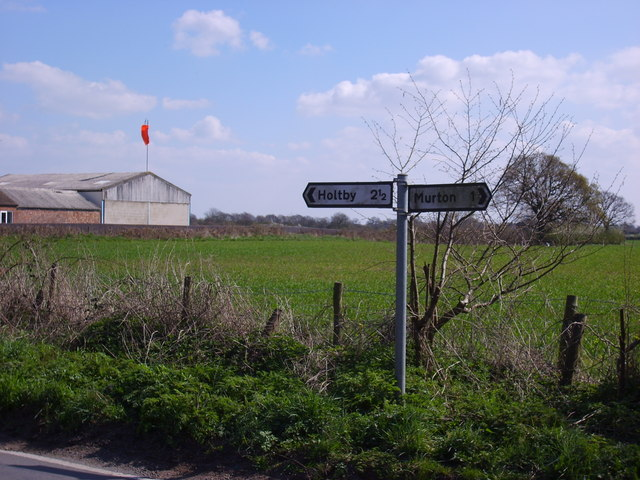
End of Bad Bargain Lane in Yorkshire

The village was historically part of the North Riding of Yorkshire until 1974. It was then a part of the district of Ryedale in North Yorkshire from 1974 until 1996. Since 1996 it has been part of the City of York unitary authority.

According to the 2001 census the parish had a population of 2,283, reducing to 2,191 at the 2011 Census.
