= Rawcliffe, North Yorkshire =

Village and civil parish in North Yorkshire, England

Coordinates: 53.98084°N 1.11339°W

Rawcliffe
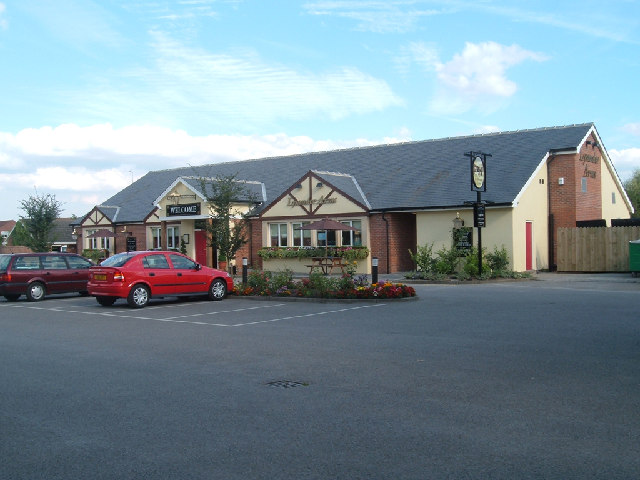
- The Lysander Arms in the centre of Rawcliffe

- Location within North Yorkshire
- Population: 6,511 (2011 census)
- OS grid reference: SE582542
- Civil parish: Rawcliffe
- Unitary authority: City of York
- Ceremonial county: North Yorkshire
- Region: Yorkshire and the Humber
- Country: England
- Sovereign state: United Kingdom
- Post town: YORK
- Postcode district: YO30
- Police: North Yorkshire
- Fire: North Yorkshire
- Ambulance: Yorkshire
- UK Parliament: York Outer

Rawcliffe is a village and civil parish in the unitary authority of the City of York in North Yorkshire, England. It is bordered by the A19 and A1237, and lies about 3 miles (4.8 km) north-west of York between Skelton and Clifton Without.

According to the 2001 census the parish had a population of 5,407, increasing to 6,511 at the 2011 Census. Before 1996 it had been part of the Ryedale district.

The area is mainly residential but is known for its wildlife reservations that border the River Ouse which flows along its western border. Wildlife found in the area includes foxes and rabbits.

The village was historically part of the North Riding of Yorkshire until 1974. It was then a part of the district of Ryedale in North Yorkshire from 1974 until 1996. Since 1996 it has been part of the City of York unitary authority.

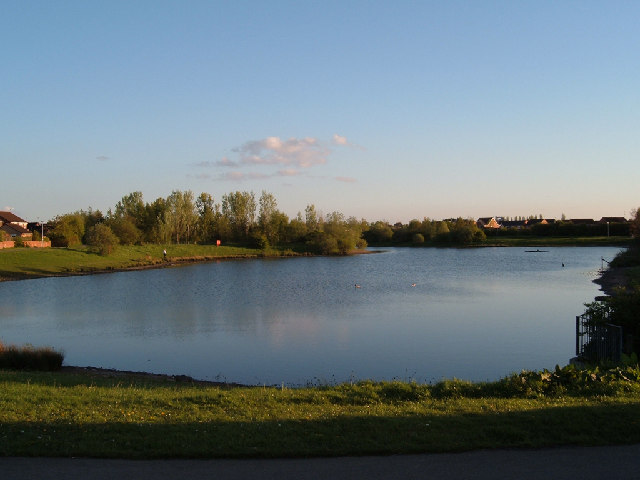
Rawcliffe Lake
