= York Outer =

UK Parliament constituency (since 2010)

Coordinates: 53.97°N 1.04°W

- County constituency for the House of Commons
- Boundaries since 2024
- Boundary of York Outer in Yorkshire and the Humber
- County: North Yorkshire
- Electorate: 72,739 (December 2019)
- Major settlements: Huntington, Haxby, Rawcliffe, Clifton Without, Heslington

Current constituency
- Created: 2010
- Member of Parliament: Luke Charters (Labour)
- Seats: One
- Created from: Ryedale, Vale of York, City of York, Selby

York Outer is a constituency (Note: A borough constituency (for the purposes of election expenses and type of returning officer)) represented in the House of Commons of the Parliament of the United Kingdom since 2024 by Luke Charters of the Labour Party. (Note: As with all constituencies, the constituency elects one Member of Parliament (MP) by the first past the post system of election at least every five years.)

== Constituency profile ==
The constituency is in the form of a ring surrounding the York Central constituency, and thus includes the outer areas of York itself and the surrounding rural areas. The Army's Queen Elizabeth Barracks, Strensall, and the former RAF Elvington and RAF Rufforth lie in the constituency, as did the University of York. Residents' health and wealth are around average for the UK. The area is currently ranked in the top 10 least deprived constituencies in the UK.

== Boundaries ==
The Boundary Commission for England reviewed parliamentary constituencies between 2000 and 2007. In York, taking into consideration that York had been enlarged and become a unitary authority in 1996, the Commission settled on two constituencies, one representing the urban constituency and one representing the rural constituency, named York Central and York Outer.

2010–2024: The City of York Council wards of: Bishopthorpe; Derwent; Dringhouses and Woodthorpe; Fulford, Haxby and Wigginton; Heslington; Heworth Without; Huntington and New Earswick; Osbaldwick; Rural West York; Skelton, Rawcliffe and Clifton Without; Strensall; and Wheldrake as they existed on 12 April 2005.

2024–present: The City of York Council wards of: Bishopthorpe; Copmanthorpe; Dringhouses & Woodthorpe; Fulford & Heslington; Haxby & Wigginton; Heworth Without; Huntington & New Earswick; Osbaldwick & Derwent; Rawcliffe & Clifton Without; Rural West York; Strensall; and Wheldrake as they existed on 1 December 2020.

Minor changes due to revised ward boundaries.

== Members of Parliament ==
Election	Member	Party
2010	Julian Sturdy	Conservative
2024	Luke Charters	Labour

== Elections ==
=== Elections in the 2020s ===
General election 2024: York Outer
Party	Candidate	Votes	%	±%
Labour	Luke Charters	23,161	45.3	▲15.4
Conservative	Julian Sturdy	13,770	26.9	▼22.7
Reform UK	John Crispin-Bailey	5,912	11.6	▲11.1
Liberal Democrats	Andrew Hollyer	5,496	10.8	▼7.9
Green	Michael Kearney	2,212	4.3	▲4.3
Yorkshire	David Eadington	260	0.5	new
Independent	Keith Hayden	141	0.3	new
Independent	Hal Mayne	88	0.2	new
Independent	Darren Burrows	66	0.1	new
Majority		9,391	18.4	
Turnout		51,106	67.3	▼8.3
Registered electors		76,228		
Labour gain from Conservative		Swing	+19.1	

=== Elections in the 2010s ===
2019 notional result
Party	Vote	%
Conservative	27,173	49.6
Labour	16,391	29.9
Liberal Democrats	10,222	18.7
Others	692	1.3
Brexit Party	263	0.5
Green	9	<0.1
Turnout	54,750	75.3
Electorate	72,720	

General election 2019: York Outer
Party	Candidate	Votes	%	±%
Conservative	Julian Sturdy	27,324	49.4	−1.7
Labour	Anna Perrett	17,339	31.3	−5.4
Liberal Democrats	Keith Aspden	9,992	18.1	+7.8
Independent	Scott Marmion	692	1.3	New
Majority		9,985	18.1	+3.7
Turnout		55,347	74.1	−1.6
Conservative hold		Swing	+1.8	

General election 2017: York Outer
Party	Candidate	Votes	%	±%
Conservative	Julian Sturdy	29,356	51.1	+2.0
Labour	Luke Charters-Reid	21,067	36.7	+11.9
Liberal Democrats	James Blanchard	5,910	10.3	−1.3
Green	Bethan Vincent	1,094	1.9	−2.8
Majority		8,289	14.4	−9.9
Turnout		57,427	75.7	+7.1
Conservative hold		Swing	−4.95	

General election 2015: York Outer
Party	Candidate	Votes	%	±%
Conservative	Julian Sturdy	26,477	49.1	+6.1
Labour	Joe Riches	13,348	24.8	+7.7
Liberal Democrats	James Blanchard	6,269	11.6	−24.5
UKIP	Paul Abbott	5,251	9.7	+7.6
Green	Ginnie Shaw	2,558	4.7	New
Majority		13,129	24.3	+17.4
Turnout		53,903	68.6	−2.5
Conservative hold		Swing	−0.8	

General election 2010: York Outer
Party	Candidate	Votes	%	±%
Conservative	Julian Sturdy	22,912	43.0	+6.7
Liberal Democrats	Madeleine Kirk	19,224	36.1	−0.7
Labour	James Alexander	9,108	17.1	−9.9
UKIP	Judith Morris	1,100	2.1	New
BNP	Cathy Smurthwaite	956	1.8	New
Majority		3,688	6.9	+7.4
Turnout		53,300	71.1	+6.7
Conservative win (new seat)				

== See also ==
- List of parliamentary constituencies in North Yorkshire
- List of parliamentary constituencies in the Yorkshire and the Humber (region)
