= Clifton Without =

Area of the City of York, North Yorkshire, England

Coordinates: 53.975781°N 1.103031°W

Clifton (Without)
- Location within North Yorkshire
- Population: 5,246 (2011 census)
- OS grid reference: SE585543
- Civil parish: Clifton Without
- Unitary authority: City of York
- Ceremonial county: North Yorkshire
- Region: Yorkshire and the Humber
- Country: England
- Sovereign state: United Kingdom
- Post town: YORK
- Postcode district: YO30
- Dialling code: 01904
- Police: North Yorkshire
- Fire: North Yorkshire
- Ambulance: Yorkshire
- UK Parliament: York Outer

Clifton Without is a suburb and civil parish in the unitary authority area of the City of York, North Yorkshire, England. It consists of those parts of Clifton that lie outside, i.e. Without, the (pre-1996) city boundaries and Clifton Moor. It lies on the A19 about two miles north-west of central York.

According to the 2001 census it had a population of 5,113, increasing to 5,246 at the 2011 Census. Before 1996 it formed part of the Ryedale district. The Parish is bounded by the River Ouse to the west and the B1363 road and River Foss in the east, and from the Clifton Moor retail park in the north to near Clifton Green in the south. The parish contains a diverse mix of industrial and retail areas, to residential areas in the rest of the parish. The area also includes the natural areas of Clifton Ings and Clifton Backies and Rawcliffe Lake.

== History ==
On 27 May 1933 an air circus visited York and flew from Rawcliffe meadow, now the site of Clifton Moor Retail Park. It demonstrated the viability of the area for a commercial airfield for York. In 1934 York Corporation compulsorily purchased parts of Clifton (Without) and Rawcilffe and on, 4 July 1936 York Municipal Aerodrome opened. Before the outbreak of the Second World War, the airfield was managed by Yorkshire Air Services and Country Club Ltd, who ran a flying club and an air taxi service, but no scheduled flights. On 1 September 1939 the airfield was requisitioned by the government for military use and was renamed RAF Clifton. It was host to a flight of Whitley Bombers.

Following an upgrade in status, the airfield became host to reconnaissance aircraft such as the Westland Lysander and the North American Mustang. The airfield also contained a large civilian staffed repair facility for the Halifax bomber. The repair centre was closed in 1948, after which the airfield returned to its former role as a flying club. Due to the high rents charged by the Air Ministry, which had not de-commissioned the site, the club closed in the 1950s and fell into disuse. Parts of the airfield can still be seen around the area, including a small portion of the runway to the north of the York Outer Ring Road. The airfield is now covered by the Clifton Moor Retail Park.

The village was historically part of the North Riding of Yorkshire until 1974. It was then a part of the district of Ryedale in North Yorkshire from 1974 until 1996. Since 1996 it has been part of the City of York unitary authority.

== Governance ==
Clifton Without is part of the Rawcliffe and Clifton Without Ward in the City of York. As of 2023 the Ward is represented by Councillors Darryl Smalley, Derek Wann and Sam Waudby, all from the local Liberal Democrats. It is also has its own parish council consisting of 10 councillors.

== Geography ==
The parish is bounded to the west by the River Ouse and the B1363 and River Foss to the east. To the north the parish meets the parish of Rawcliffe. To the south the boundary runs past Homestead Park from the Ouse then northward along the A19 to turn east along Brompton Road, then it turns north up Water Lane before going east again along Lilbourne Drive and then following the waterway known as Bur Dyke. Where Bur Dyke reaches Bootham Stray it extends an arm towards the Nestle Factory they and ends at the River Foss.

The parish contains Clifton Backies Nature Reserve which, in 2002, was designated as a local nature reserve. The diverse habitats support many different species of mammal, bird, insect and plant life. It was part of the former Clifton Airfield but after its last use in the Berlin Airlift in the late 1940s, it was allowed to return to nature. The land originally belonged to St Mary's Abbey, but after the dissolution of the monasteries the land was part of a furlong or field known as 'Moor Broats' and cultivated under the strip farming system in medieval times. The current ridge and furrow appearance of the fields shows its previous history.

The meadows are home to short-tailed vole, with the Bur Dyke home for water voles, rabbits, fox, weasel, common shrew, hedgehog, bank vole, wood mouse and roe deer have been seen on the site. Bats can also be seen over the meadows. Suitable breeding habitats for the common frog and smooth newt are provided by seasonal ponds. The Bur Dyke supports a population of three-spined stickleback. Birds that frequent the area include blackbird, blue tit, great tit, wren, dunnock, robin, common chaffinch, bullfinch, blackcap, whitethroat, willow warbler, fieldfare, redwing, heron, kingfisher and chiffchaff. A recent survey identified 22 species of butterfly on the site, including speckled wood, holly blue, small copper, brown argus and marbled white.

Amongst the flora in the area are many species of wildflowers and grasses, including dog's tail, knapweed, red clover, great burnet, pignut, with such waterside plants as watercress and water forget-me-not.

== Economy ==
The parish includes the Clifton Moor Retail and Industrial Park where there are many nationwide and local stores, small and medium-sized enterprises, as well as entertainment venues.

== Transport ==
Due to the A19 and Clifton Retail Park being within the Parish boundary, Clifton Without is served by many bus routes.

== Education ==
Primary education is catered for by the Clifton with Rawcliffe Federation. This is a partnership of the Rawcliffe Infant and Nursery School on Eastholme Drive in nearby Rawcliffe, where pupils up to Year 2 are taught prior to going to Clifton with Rawcliffe Junior School on Rawcliffe Lane. Secondary Education is provided at Vale of York Academy, located on the same site as Clifton with Rawcliffe Junior School on Rawcliffe Lane. This school has been designated a specialist arts college. The school was opened in April 1941 and is an 11-16 comprehensive with catchment from the city centre to the village of Skelton.

== Religious sites ==
Clifton Moor Church opened in September 1998, and is a partnership of two churches. It has links to both the Church of England and the Methodist Church. York Council gave the land, and the local Church raised the money to pay for the building.

== Sports ==
York Sports Club is located in the south of the parish on the A19 near Clifton Ings. It provides facilities for four sports club; York Cricket Club; York Rugby Union Football Club; York Squash Club and York Tennis Club.

York Cricket Club has been in existence for over 200 years. It first played matches on the Knavesmire in 1790 before moving to the site of the York District Hospital on Wigginton Road. It moved to its present site upon purchase of land from the Clifton Hospital in 1967. York Cricket Club was a founding member of the Yorkshire Cricket League in 1935, which it has won on 10 occasions. It also won the National Knockout Cup in 1975. As of 2010 it has five senior men's teams, nine junior teams, ranging from U9s to U17s, and one ladies’ team.

York RUFC moved to its present location a t the same time as the Cricket Club. It fields four senior sides as well as juniors, seniors and veterans. They have won the Yorkshire Shield three times. The 1st XV play in the Yorkshire 1 league, the 2nd XV play in the Yorkshire 2nd XV Merit League Division 1 and the 3rd XV play in the North Yorkshire Merit Table. The 4th XV are a social side and play friendlies.

York Squash Club has eight men's teams and two ladies teams in the York and District League. As of 2010 York Men's 1st, 2nd and 3rd all play in Division 1. York Men's 4th and 5th play in Division 3, York Men's 6th in Division 4 and the Men's 7th and 8th in Division 5.

York Tennis Club was formed in 1966 following the merger of Clifton and Tanh Hall clubs, who were both facing eviction from their grounds. The club run 16 teams in both local and county leagues. Facilities include six carpet based courts with some floodlit courts and shale courts. The club have one Ladies and one Men's team in the Yorkshire League Doubles competition. One men's team plays in both singles and doubles competitions in the National League. They have six mixed doubles teams in the York & District Mixed Doubles League and four teams in the Men's Local Doubles League with 2 Ladies teams in the Ladies Local Doubles League.

== Gallery ==
Views of Clifton Without
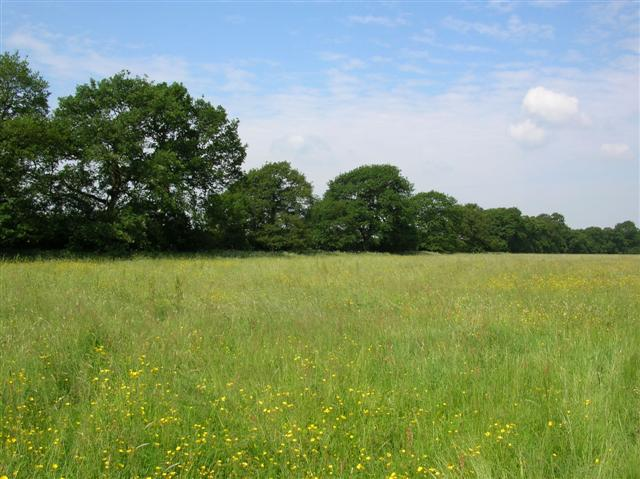
Clifton Ings near Sustrans cycle route 65

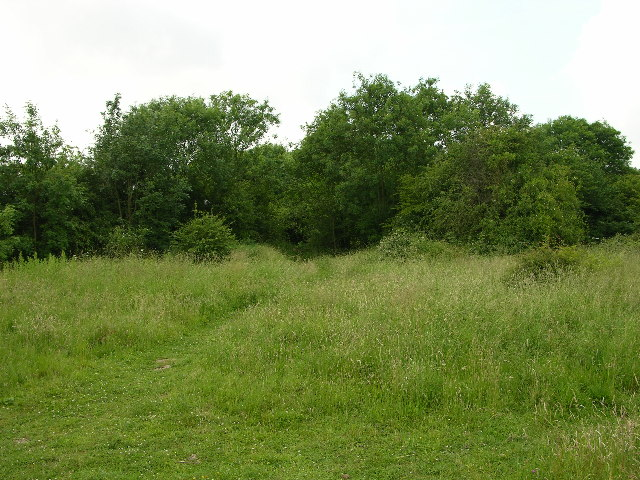
Clifton Backies Local Nature Reserve near the old aerodrome buildings

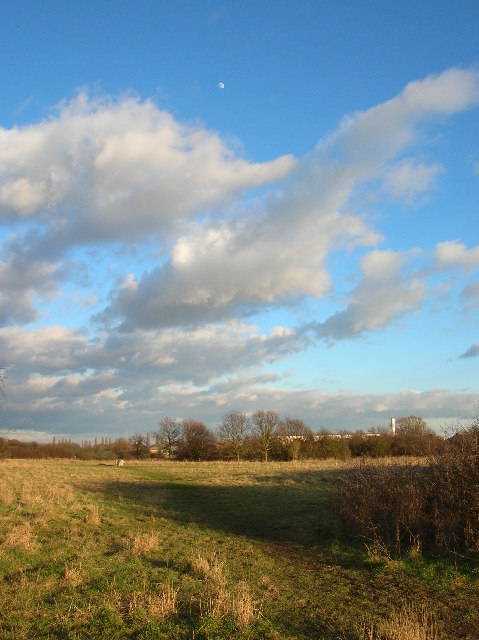
Clifton Backies on the edge of the Clifton Moor industrial estate

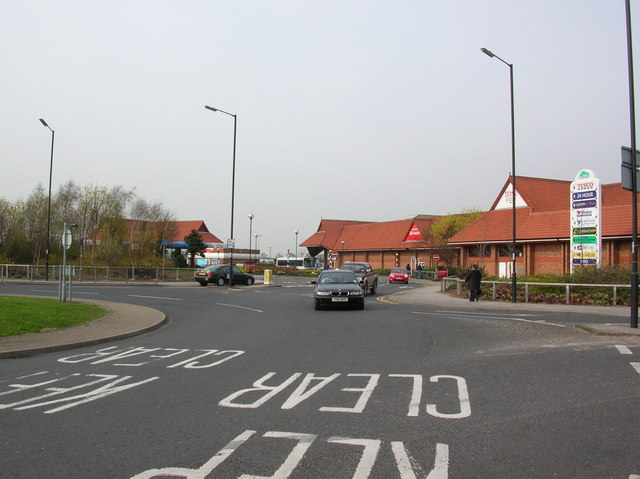
Entrance to Clifton Moor Retail Park
