= City of York =

Unitary authority area in North Yorkshire, England

- Unitary authority area with city status
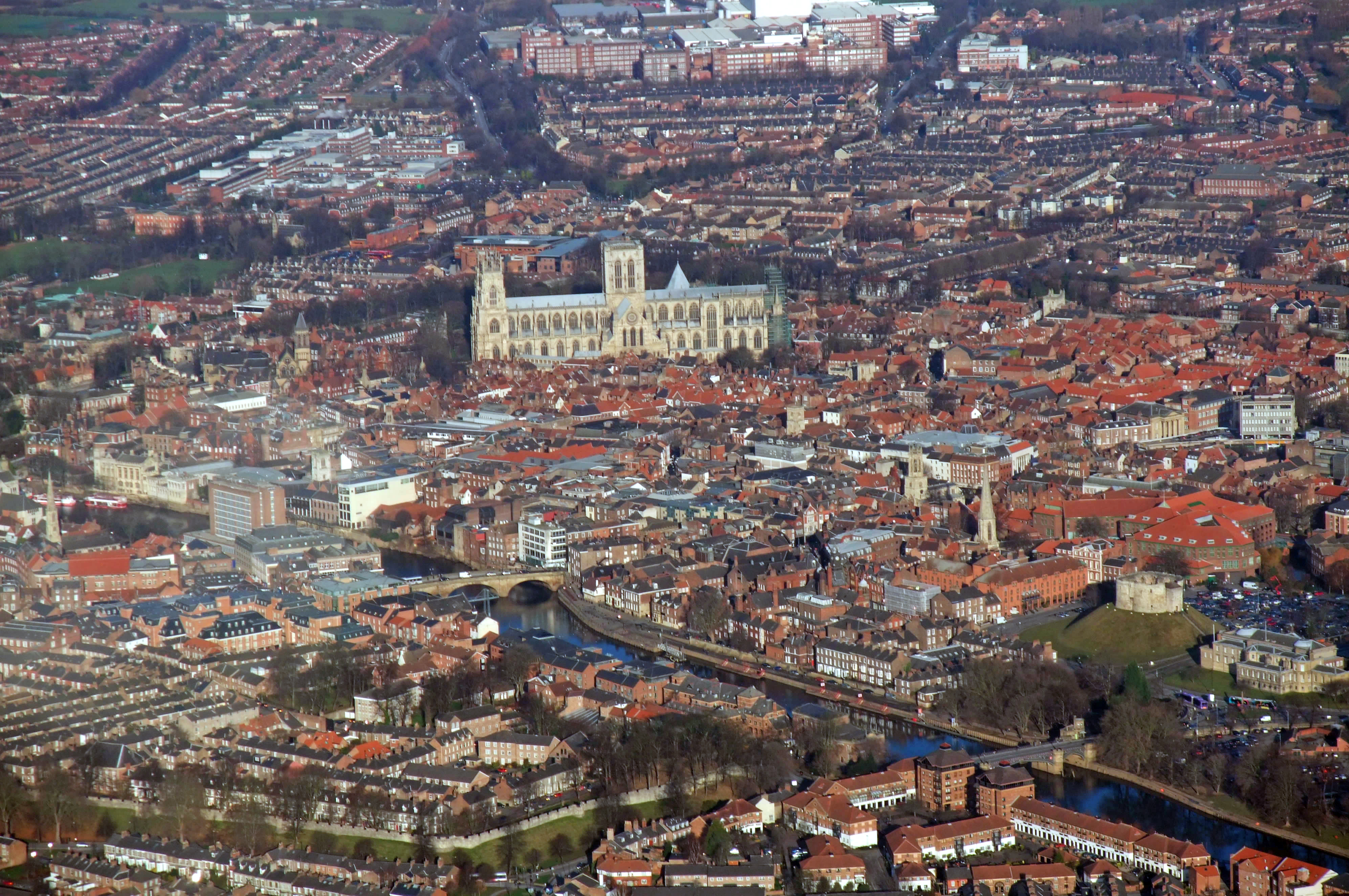
- York city centre and its minster from above

- Flag Coat of arms
- Nickname: Chocolate City
- Motto: Let the Banner of York Fly High
- York shown within North Yorkshire
- Coordinates: 53°57′30″N 1°4′49″W
- Sovereign state: United Kingdom
- Country: England
- Region: Yorkshire and the Humber
- Ceremonial county: North Yorkshire
- Combined authority: York and North Yorkshire
- Incorporated: 1 April 1974
- Unitary authority: 1 April 1996
- Administrative HQ: West Offices

Government
  - Type: Unitary authority
  - Body: City of York Council
  - Executive: Leader and cabinet
  - Control: Labour
  - MPs: Rachael Maskell (L); Luke Charters (L)

Area
  - Total: 105 sq mi (272 km^{2})
  - Rank: 129th

Population (2024)
  - Total: 209,301
  - Rank: 97th
  - Density: 2,000/sq mi (770/km^{2})

Ethnicity (2021)
  - Ethnic groups: List: 92.8% White; 3.8% Asian; 1.8% Mixed; 0.7% Black; 1.0% other

Religion (2021)
  - Religion: List: 46.1% no religion; 43.9% Christianity; 1.2% Islam; 0.5% Buddhism; 0.5% Hinduism; 0.1% Judaism; 0.1% Sikhism; 0.6% other; 6.9% not stated
- Time zone: UTC+0 (GMT)
  - Summer (DST): UTC+1 (BST)
- Postcode areas: YO
- Dialling codes: 01904
- ISO 3166 code: GB-YOR
- GSS code: E06000014
- Website: york.gov.uk

The City of York is a unitary authority area with city status in the ceremonial county of North Yorkshire, England.

The district's main settlement is York, and its coverage extends to the town of Haxby and the villages of Earswick, Upper Poppleton, Nether Poppleton, Copmanthorpe, Bishopthorpe, Dunnington, Stockton on the Forest, Rufforth, Askham Bryan and Askham Richard, among other villages and hamlets. The district had a population of 202,800 in the 2021 Census The City of York is administered by the City of York Council based in The Guildhall.

== Governance ==
York's first citizen and civic head is the Lord Mayor, who is the chairperson of the City of York Council. The appointment is made by the city council each year in May, at the same time as appointing the Sheriff, the city's other civic head. The offices of lord mayor and sheriff are purely ceremonial. The Lord Mayor carries out civic and ceremonial duties in addition to chairing full council meetings. The incumbent lord mayor since 23 May 2024 is Councillor Margaret Wells, the sheriff is Fiona Fitzpatrick.

As a result of the 2023 City of York Council election, the Labour Party gained a majority of the seats on the council, receiving 24 seats. The Liberal Democrats have 19 councillors, while the Conservative Party had 3 councillors with one Independent councillor, who subsequently moved to Restore Britain in 2026. The Green Party lost all 3 of the seats it held before this election. Claire Douglas was sworn in as the new leader of the Labour administration on 25 May 2023.

Party	Seats	City of York Council (2023 election)
Labour	24	
Liberal Democrats	19	
Conservative	3	
Restore	1	

== Civil parishes ==
The district contains the unparished area of York and 31 civil parishes:

- Acaster Malbis
- Askham Bryan
- Askham Richard
- Bishopthorpe
- Clifton Without
- Copmanthorpe
- Deighton
- Dunnington
- Earswick
- Elvington
- Fulford
- Haxby
- Heslington
- Hessay
- Heworth Without
- Holtby
- Huntington
- Kexby
- Murton
- Naburn
- Nether Poppleton
- New Earswick
- Osbaldwick
- Rawcliffe
- Rufforth with Knapton
- Skelton
- Stockton-on-the-Forest
- Strensall with Towthorpe
- Upper Poppleton
- Wheldrake
- Wigginton

== Wards ==
York is divided into 21 electoral wards: Acomb, Bishopthorpe, Clifton, Copmanthorpe, Dringhouses and Woodthorpe, Fishergate, Fulford and Heslington, Guildhall, Haxby and Wigginton, Heworth, Heworth Without, Holgate, Hull Road, Huntington and New Earswick, Micklegate, Osbaldwick and Derwent, Rawcliffe and Clifton Without, Rural West York, Strensall, Westfield, and Wheldrake.

== History ==
The unitary authority area was formed on 1 April 1996 by creating a new non-metropolitan district and coterminous non-metropolitan county, both called York, and the City of York Council by creating a new district council with the powers of a county council. The area was created from parts of the non-metropolitan county of North Yorkshire: the entirety of the non-metropolitan district of York, four parishes from the district of Harrogate, (Note: Hessay, Nether Poppleton, Rufforth, and Upper Poppleton) fifteen parishes from the district of Ryedale, (Note: Clifton Without, Earswick, Haxby, Heworth Without, Holtby, Huntington, Murton, New Earswick, Osbaldwick, Rawcliffe, Skelton, Stockton-on-the-Forest, Strensall, Towthorpe, and Wigginton) and thirteen parishes from the district of Selby. (Note: Acaster Malbis, Askham Bryan, Askham Richard, Bishopthorpe, Copmanthorpe, Deighton, Dunnington, Elvington, Fulford, Heslington, Kexby, North Yorkshire, Naburn and Wheldrake) It ceased to be part of the non-metropolitan county of North Yorkshire, but remained part of the ceremonial county of the same name.

The 1974–1996 district of York had itself replaced a county borough with the same boundaries. As the abolition of the previous district also abolished its city status and the right of the mayor and deputy mayor to style themselves "The Right Honourable", on 1 April 1996 new letters patent were issued conferring this status and right on the new district.

== Ceremonial ==
York is within the ceremonial county of North Yorkshire and, until 1974, was within the jurisdiction of the Lord Lieutenant of the County of York, West Riding and the County of The City of York. The city retains the right to appoint its own Sheriff. The holder of the Royal dukedom of York has no responsibilities, either ceremonially or administratively, pertaining to the city.
