= Brandsby =

Village in North Yorkshire, England

Coordinates: 54.14°N 01.11°W

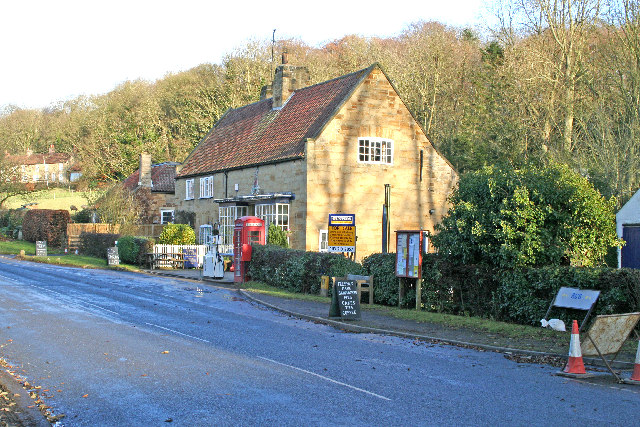
- Brandsby

- Location within North Yorkshire
- Population: 234
- OS grid reference: SE5872
- Unitary authority: North Yorkshire
- Ceremonial county: North Yorkshire
- Region: Yorkshire and the Humber
- Country: England
- Sovereign state: United Kingdom
- Post town: YORK
- Postcode district: YO61
- Police: North Yorkshire
- Fire: North Yorkshire
- Ambulance: Yorkshire
- UK Parliament: Thirsk and Malton (UK Parliament constituency)

Brandsby is a village in North Yorkshire, England. The village is the main constituent of the Brandsby-cum-Stearsby civil parish. The village is mentioned in the Domesday Book. It lies between Easingwold and Hovingham, some 12.3 miles (19.8 km) north of York.

== History ==
The village toponymy is of Scandinavian origin named after a Norseman called Brand and the suffix of by meaning settlement or habitation. At the time of the Norman conquest, it was held by Cnut, son of Karli and afterwards by Hugh, son of Baldric. Later the village and the surrounding lands were given to Baron Roger de Mowbray. It was part of the Bulford Hundred. The Baron left the lordship of the manor to Nicholas de Riparia (or de le Ryver, or Delariver).

In the reign of Henry VIII, Thomas Delariver enclosed common land used as pasture by Brandsby farmers near Down Wood. William Swayll and John Gray complained by sending a petition to the King. They said Delariver had sent armed men to Down Wood in June 1532 to threaten them. Thomas Delariver's response was to claim that he held all rights to the lands, and the farmer's complaint was stirred up by a rival landowner John a Barton.

In the reign of Queen Elizabeth I the lordship passed via marriage to the Cholmeley family, descended from the Cholmondeley family of Cheshire. They provided a long lineage of Brandsby squires but, unfortunately, few records of this period exist as one of the Cholmeleys lost his mind and not only destroyed the family archives but threw his wife to her death (it is said) from an upper window of the Hall, giving rise to a ghost story!

Roger Cholmeley of Brandsby travelled to Wingfield Manor to meet Mary, Queen of Scots on 24 August 1569. He wrote a letter to his friend Thomas Markenfield describing the visit and invited him to his "poor house at Brandsbye". The letter was intercepted and passed to William Cecil. In 1767, Francis Cholmeley set about the complete rebuilding of Brandsby Hall. He was a self-taught architect and had acted as agent to the Fairfax family at Gilling Castle. On his initiative, the ruinous Norman church adjoining the Hall was pulled down. He donated a fresh site, to the north-east of the Hall, and also met almost the entire cost of building the new church in 1770. The result was the distinguished edifice which the village has inherited today; the only church in the district built in the classical style.

The lordship ended with the last of the Cholmeley family, Hugh Charles Fairfax-Cholmeley, who died in 1940 after a reign of 51 years.

Later in the 20th century, the village was the site for the York 37 Royal Observer Corps Post (Brandsby). The Nuclear Monitoring Post is located on the road between the village and Crayke at Zion Hill Farm. It was part of the York No' 20 Group ROC HQ and was opened in June 1964 and closed in September 1991. It is now a Grade II Listed building and although the Post had been restored the restorer has allegedly been evicted due to getting the Post listed against the farmer's wishes. The Post website has been taken over by a company selling sunglasses.

== Economy ==
During the 13th and 14th centuries, Brandsby was the production centre for the Brandsby-type ware of Medieval ceramic.

== Governance ==
The village lies within the UK parliamentary constituency of Thirsk and Malton. From 1974 to 2023 it was part of the Hambleton District, it is now administered by the unitary North Yorkshire Council.

The Parish Council is made of five councillors including the Chair.

== Geography ==
The village is situated near the Howardian Hills, south of the North York Moors. At the latter end of the nineteenth century, the population was around 300, which has fallen to 234 according to the 2001 UK Census. There are 117 dwellings in the parish. Of the total population, 202 are over the age of sixteen, of which 115 are in employment.

On the west side of the village is Brandsby Beck, which flows into the River Foss. The nearest settlements are Yearsley, 1.27 miles (2.04 km) to the north; Stearsby, 1.5 miles (2.4 km) to the west-south-west; Stillington, 2.9 miles (4.7 km) to the south and Crayke, 2 miles (3.2 km) to the south-west. The B1363 road between York and Oswaldkirk passes through the village.

The soil in the parish is made of sand and gravel on top of Lias and Oolite.

== Education ==
The village lies within the Northallerton Local Education Authority area. The nearest Primary education can be found in either Crayke or Stillington. Secondary education is provided in Easingwold.

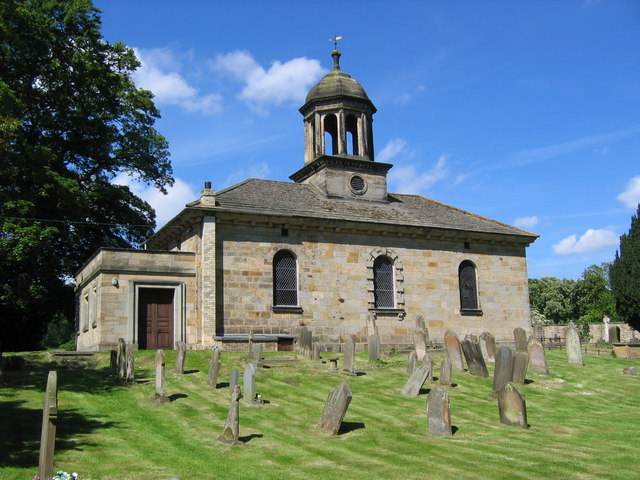
All Saints Church, Brandsby

== Religion ==
All Saints' Church, Brandsby, is situated in what used to be the grounds of Brandsby Hall. As stated above, it was built to replace the old church by the York architect Thomas Atkinson for Francis Cholmeley of Brandsby Hall in 1770. It was restored by the London architect Temple Lushington Moore in 1905 and is a Grade II* listed building.

== Notable landmarks and residents ==
Brandsby Hall was constructed to an Italianate design for Francis Cholmeley in 1745 on the site of an old mansion (see above). It is built of sandstone in 3 storeys to a U-shaped plan, with a 7-bay frontage. It is a Grade II* listed building. The chapel on the grounds is now the village church.

The Old Rectory dates from 1565 and was built by the incumbent, Robert Wilson. It was remodelled by the then rector, Walter Smith, in 1807. It is also listed Grade II*.

Cherry Hill is an arts and crafts country house, designed in 1909 by Fred Rowntree.

Notable residents include England and Yorkshire cricketeer, Paul Gibb, and author, Justin Hill.

== See also ==
- Listed buildings in Brandsby-cum-Stearsby
