= Brandsby Hall =

Grade II* building in North Yorkshire, England

Coordinates: 54°08′20″N 1°05′12″W

Brandsby Hall is a historic building in Brandsby-cum-Stearsby, a village in North Yorkshire in England.

The hall was built between 1742 and 1748, on the initiative of Francis Cholmeley, on the site of an earlier house. In about 1785, it was altered, probably by Thomas Atkinson. The Chomeley family sold the house in 1912, following which it had a various private owners. It was Grade II* listed in 1952. In 2015, it was placed on the market for £4.75 million. At the time, it had a drawing room, study, billiards room, kitchen/breakfast room, nine bedrooms and eight bathrooms.

A country house in sandstone with a hipped Westmorland slate roof, three storeys and a U-shaped plan. The south front has seven bays, and there are five bays in the returns. The south front has a plinth, rusticated quoins, floor bands, a moulded cornice and a parapet. The windows are sashes in architraves with keystones.

== See also ==
- Grade II* listed buildings in North Yorkshire (district)
- Listed buildings in Brandsby-cum-Stearsby
