= Listed buildings in Brandsby-cum-Stearsby =

Brandsby-cum-Stearsby is a civil parish in the county of North Yorkshire, England. It contains 16 listed buildings that are recorded in the National Heritage List for England. Of these, three are listed at Grade II*, the middle of the three grades, and the others are at Grade II, the lowest grade. The parish contains the villages of Brandsby and Stearsby, and the surrounding countryside. Most of the listed buildings are houses, cottages and associated structures, farmhouses and farm buildings, and the others include a church and two mileposts.

== Key ==
Grade	Criteria
II*	Particularly important buildings of more than special interest
II	Buildings of national importance and special interest

== Buildings ==
Name and location	Photograph	Date	Notes	Grade
Stearsby Grange; 54.13602°N 1.06824°W	—	Early to mid 15th century	A farmhouse in sandstone that has a pantile roof with moulded coping and shaped kneelers. There are two storeys and an attic, and three bays. In the centre is a doorway, and the windows are sashes, all with flat arches and voussoirs.	II
The Old Rectory; 54.14097°N 1.08651°W		16th century	The rectory, later a private house, was extended at right angles in 1807, and is in sandstone. The original part has a red and blue pantile roof, two low storeys, seven bays, and a rear outshut. It contains double-chamfered mullioned windows with four-centred arched lights and sunken spandrels. The later range has a hipped Westmorland slate roof, two storeys and five bays. It is on a plinth, and has a floor band, a cornice and a parapet. In the centre is a portico with Tuscan half-columns and a pediment, and a doorway with a traceried fanlight. The windows are sashes with cantilevered lintels and keystones.	II*
Seaves Farmhouse and Cottage; 54.13605°N 1.10521°W	—	Early 18th century	The farmhouse and cottage are in sandstone and have pantile roofs with stone coping and shaped kneelers, and two storeys. The farmhouse has three bays, an eaves band, and a blocked doorway. The windows are sashes, those in the upper floor horizontally-sliding. The cottage to the right is taller and has two bays. It contains a doorway with a fanlight and sash windows, and has a rear wing.	II
Farm building and wall, Seaves Farmhouse; 54.13594°N 1.10523°W	—	Early 18th century	The farm building is in sandstone, with quoins, an eaves band, and a pantile roof with moulded coping and shaped kneelers. There is a single storey and a loft, and three bays. It contains a doorway, a stable door and a shuttered window, and in the gable end is a Diocletian window. Attached is a screen wall containing a doorway.	II
Spellar Park; 54.13219°N 1.08394°W	—	Early to mid 18th century	A farmhouse, later a private house, it is in sandstone and has pantile roofs with stone coping and moulded kneelers. There are two ranges, each with two bays and eaves bands. The lower range has a single storey and an attic, and contains a canted bay window, a doorway with a fanlight and a lintel with a keystone, and dormers above. The taller range has two storeys and an attic, a plinth, a floor band, and sash windows, those in the upper floor horizontally-sliding, with lintels and keystones.	II
Barn northeast of Warren House; 54.15103°N 1.08051°W	—	Early to mid 18th century	The barn is in sandstone, and has a pantile roof with moulded coping and shaped kneelers. There are two storeys and four bays. The openings include segmental-arched cart entries, some blocked or altered, and slit vents.	II
Brandsby Hall; 54.13895°N 1.08681°W	—	c. 1742–48	A country house in sandstone with a hipped Westmorland slate roof, three storeys and a U-shaped plan. The south front has seven bays, and there are five bays in the returns. The south front has a plinth, rusticated quoins, floor bands, a moulded cornice and a parapet. The windows are sashes in architraves with keystones.	II*
Warren House and Cottage; 54.15072°N 1.08086°W	—	c. 1745	The house and attached cottage are in sandstone and have pantile roofs with moulded coping and shaped kneelers. The house has two storeys and an attic and three bays, a plinth, a floor band, an eaves band, a central doorway and sash windows, some horizontally-sliding. The openings have cantilevered lintels and projecting keystones. The cottage is lower, with two storeys and one bay, and a floor band, and it contains sash windows with flat arches.	II
Stables, Brandsby Hall; 54.13939°N 1.08674°W	—	1745–48	The stable block is in sandstone with Westmorland slate roofs. There are nine bays, the middle three bays projecting, with two storeys. They have a chamfered rusticated ground floor on a plinth, and contain three round-arched openings with keystones, linking impost bands and doorways with fanlights. Above is a floor band, sash windows in architraves, a clock face, a moulded cornice, and a hipped roof. On the roof is a square cupola with a louvred opening, pediments and a weathervane. The wings have one storey and a loft, they contain doorways and windows, and above are Diocletian windows.	II
Icehouse, Brandsby Hall; 54.14012°N 1.08620°W	—	Mid 18th century (probable)	The icehouse has a stone exterior, and consists of a rounded structure over an entrance tunnel. At the west end is an embattled gable with a round-arched opening. Inside is a short barrel-arched tunnel leading to a deep tapering cylindrical ice chamber in brick with domed roof.	II
All Saints' Church; 54.13981°N 1.08557°W		1767–70	The church was designed by Thomas Atkinson and restored in 1905 by Temple Moore. It is built in sandstone with a hipped stone slate roof, and consists of a nave and a chancel with three bays in one range, a south porch and a vestry. Over the middle bay is a cupola with an oculus in the square base, eight round-arched openings with three-quarter columns, a Doric frieze, and a stone dome with a ball finial and a weathervane. The windows on the sides of the church have round-arched heads, some with Gibbs surrounds, and at the east end is a Venetian window.	II*
Stable block, The Old Rectory; 54.14124°N 1.08642°W	—	c. 1810	The stable block is in sandstone with a pantile roof, and consists of a two-storey coach house flanked by single-storey stables. In the centre is a segmental-headed coach entrance, above which is an oculus, a six-hole dovecote, an eaves band, and a hipped roof. Each of the outer bays contains a casement window with a cantilevered lintel and a keystone.	II
Gateway, Brandsby Hall; 54.13940°N 1.08427°W	—	Early 19th century (probable)	The entrance to the drive is flanked by low sandstone walls with segmental coping. The railings, gates and gate [piers are in wrought iron. The gates have Vitruvian scroll motifs, and the gate piers have a box section, scrolled panels and ogee finials.	II
Milepost near junction with Yearsley Road; 54.14590°N 1.09783°W		Late 19th century	The milepost on the north side of Brandsby Bank (B1363 road) is in cast iron and has a triangular plan and a sloping top. On the top is inscribed "BULMER WEST H.D" and on the sides are pointing hands. The left side indicates the distance to Helmsley, and on the right side is the distance to York.	II
Milepost south of Water End; 54.13398°N 1.10434°W		Late 19th century	The milepost on the west side of the B1363 road is in cast iron and has a triangular plan and a sloping top. On the top is inscribed "BULMER WEST H.D" and on the sides are pointing hands. The left side indicates the distance to Helmsley, and on the right side is the distance to York.	II
Mill Hill; 54.14230°N 1.09899°W	—	c. 1892	The house was designed by Detmar Blow, it was enlarged in 1903 by Alfred Powell, and a wing was added at right angles in 1977 by Martin Stanclifffe. It is in sandstone with pantile roofs, and has an irregular L-shaped plan, with two storeys and a loft. The windows are a mix of horizontally-sliding sashes and casements with segmental-arched heads.	II
