= Middlethorpe, North Yorkshire =

Hamlet in North Yorkshire, England

Coordinates: 53.931200°N 1.087900°W

Middlethorpe
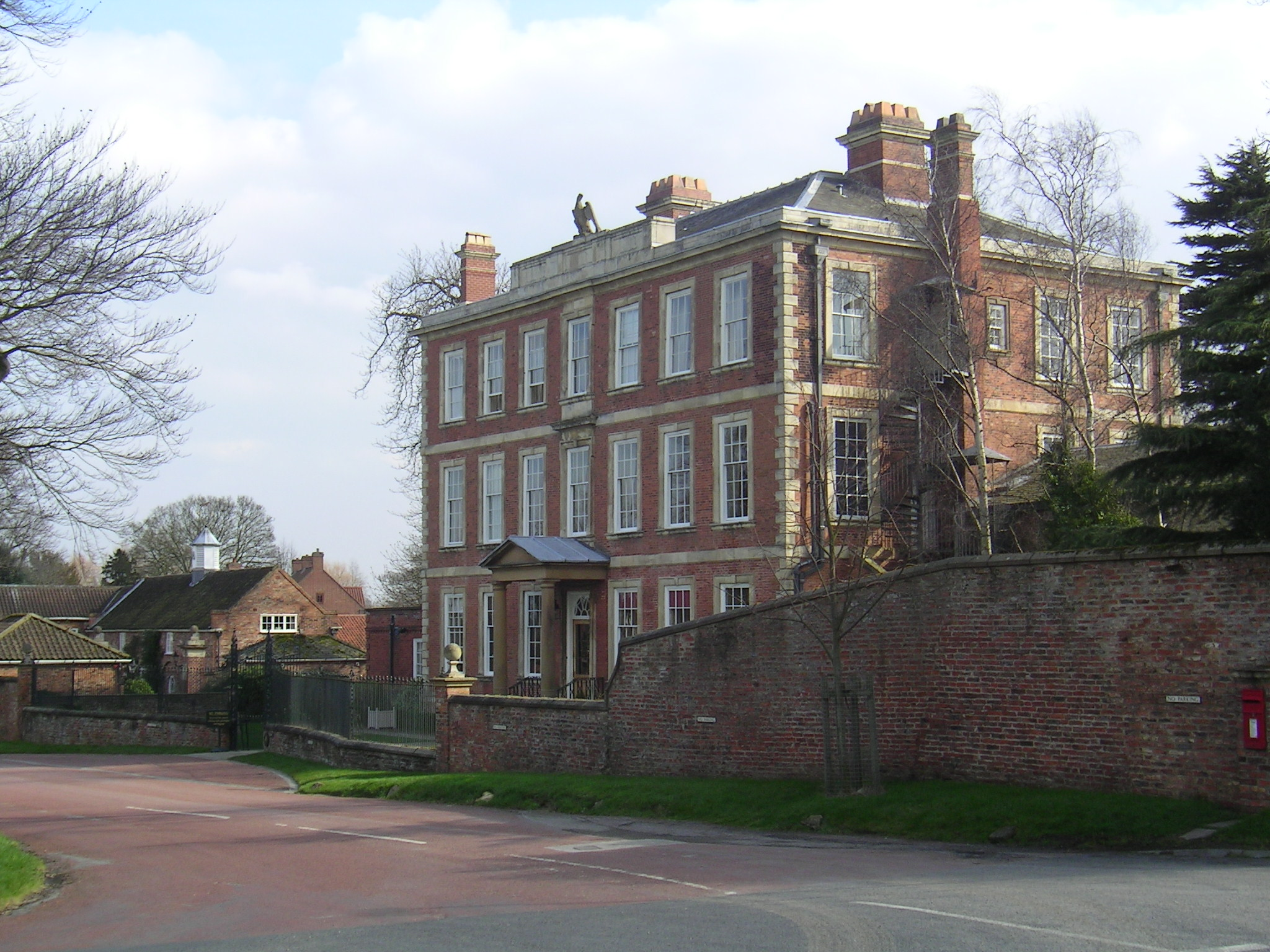
- Middlethorpe Hall

- Location within North Yorkshire
- OS grid reference: SE599487
- Civil parish: Bishopthorpe
- Unitary authority: City of York
- Ceremonial county: North Yorkshire
- Region: Yorkshire and the Humber
- Country: England
- Sovereign state: United Kingdom
- Post town: YORK
- Postcode district: YO23
- Police: North Yorkshire
- Fire: North Yorkshire
- Ambulance: Yorkshire
- UK Parliament: York Outer

Middlethorpe is a hamlet in the civil parish of Bishopthorpe, in the unitary authority area of City of York, in North Yorkshire, England.

The village was made a Conservation Area in 1975. Middlethorpe Hall dates from 1699 and Middlethorpe Manor from about 1700.

Middlethorpe was formerly a township in the parish of St. Mary-Bishopshill-Senior, in 1866 Middlethorpe became a separate civil parish, in 1894 the parish was abolished and split to form Middlethorpe Within from the part in the County Borough of York and Middlethorpe Without from the rural part. In 1891 the parish had a population of 128.

The name Middlethorpe derives from the Old English middel meaning 'middle', and the Old Norse þorp meaning 'secondary settlement'.

== See also ==
- Listed buildings in Bishopthorpe
