= Listed buildings in Bishopthorpe =

Bishopthorpe is a civil parish in the unitary authority of the City of York, North Yorkshire, England. It contains 23 listed buildings that are recorded in the National Heritage List for England. Of these, one is listed at Grade I, the highest of the three grades, three are at Grade II*, the middle grade, and the others are at Grade II. The parish contains the villages of Bishopthorpe and Middlethorpe, and the surrounding area. The most important building in the parish is Bishopthorpe Palace, the official residence of the Archbishop of York, which is listed, together with a number of associated structures. The other listed buildings include houses and associated structures, a church and the ruins of its predecessor, a public house, and a war memorial.

== Key ==
Grade	Criteria
I	Buildings of exceptional interest, sometimes considered to be internationally important
II*	Particularly important buildings of more than special interest
II	Buildings of national importance and special interest

== Buildings ==
Name and location	Photograph	Date	Notes	Grade
Bishopthorpe Palace and chapel 53.92310°N 1.09214°W		13th century	The official residence of the Archbishop of York, it has been altered and extended through the centuries, including remodelling between 1763 and 1769 by Thomas Atkinson. It is built in magnesian limestone and in pinkish-red and brown brick, and has an irregular plan. The entrance front has two storeys and a semi-basement, and seven bays. The porch has three narrow pointed arches on the front with hood moulds, and one on the sides. The main windows are sashes with depressed arches and hood moulds, and at the top is a parapet of openwork battlements, rising to a pediment in the centre. The chapel, also dating from the 13th century, is on the south side, and contains lancet windows.	I
Sundial, Bishopthorpe Palace; 53.92299°N 1.09169°W		Medieval	The sundial in the grounds to the southeast of the house is in magnesian limestone. The base is the older part, with the sundial dating probably from the 18th century. The base is circular and about 1 metre (3 ft 3 in) in height.	II
Dovecote, Middlethorpe Hall; 53.93046°N 1.08896°W	—	Late 17th century	The dovecote, later used for other purposes, is in red brick, with a floor band, the eaves are enclosed by a timber landing platform on shaped brackets with dove holes above, and it has a tile pyramidal roof. There is a square plan, and two storeys. On the west is a doorway with a segmental arch, and on the roof is an octagonal lantern with diamond lattice glazing and a lead ogee roof. Inside, it is lined with nesting boxes.	II
Middlethorpe Manor; 53.93110°N 1.08636°W	—	Late 17th century	A house that was later extended, it is stuccoed, on a shallow stone plinth, with a projecting moulded timber cornice, and hipped slate roofs. There are two storeys, a central range of three bays, recessed between a three-bay wing on the left and a two-bay wing on the right. In the centre is a gabled porch, and the windows are sashes. On the right return is a full-height semicircular bow window, and there are three box dormers on the central range.	II
Middlethorpe Hall; 53.93065°N 1.08994°W		c. 1700	A country house, later a hotel, in red brick on a plinth, with stone dressings, rusticated quoins, floor bands, a moulded cornice, and hipped slate roofs. On the roof at the front and the rear is a centrepiece surmounted by an eagle. There are three storeys and a basement, seven bays, and recessed single-storey wings. In the centre is a Tuscan porch with a pediment, and a doorway and a fanlight with a moulded surround. The windows are sashes, those above the porch with eared and fasciated surrounds, and the others with keystones. The basement windows are mullioned. At the rear is a porch with a frieze and a cornice. There are three-bay single-storey flanking wings with Corinthian pilasters, an entablature and a brick parapet with stone balustrading.	II*
The Cottage; 53.92202°N 1.09363°W		Early 18th century	Two houses combined into one, in colourwashed brick with a pantile roof. There are two storeys and four bays. On the front is a projecting porch with a doorway on the right return, to its left is a bow window, and the other windows are sashes, some horizontally sliding, and some with wedge lintels.	II
Chestnut Cottage; 53.92194°N 1.09396°W		Early to mid-18th century	The house is in whitewashed brick, with a dentilled cornice, and a pantile roof. There are two storeys and four bays. The doorway has pilasters and a triangular pediment. Most of the windows are sashes, there is one horizontally sliding sash window. and one replacement casement window.	II
The Chantry; 53.92201°N 1.09182°W		Early to mid-18th century	A vicarage, later a private house, in colourwashed brick on a three-course plinth, with stone dressings, and a Welsh slate roof with tumbled-in brick on the gables. There are two storeys and five bays. The doorway is on the right gable end, and has an oblong fanlight and a gable-ended hood. The original entrance has been replaced by a casement window, and the other windows are sashes with flat arches of gauged brick and keystones.	II
Brewster's cottage and brewhouse 53.92336°N 1.09429°W		Mid-18th century	The building, later a house, is in pinkish-brown brick, with a three-course floor band, a stepped eaves band, and a hipped tile roof. There are two storeys and three bays, and an outshut on the right. The left entrance has a segmental head of gauged brick, and the right entrance has an elliptical arch. The windows are a mix of sashes and casements, most under elliptical heads.	II
Priory Corner; 53.92232°N 1.09418°W		Mid-18th century	The house is in brown brick, with red brick dressings, floor bands, a modillion eaves band, and a roof of tile at the front and pantile at the rear. There are three storeys and three bays, a two-storey outshut on the right, and a central stair turret at the rear. In the centre of the front is a portico with freestanding slender columns, engaged pilasters, a frieze, a dentilled cornice and a pediment. The cornice continues over the flanking canted bay windows. The upper floors contain sash windows, those on the middle floor with architraves and flat brick arches.	II
Ebor Inn; 53.92148°N 1.09563°W		Mid-18th century	The public house is in colourwashed and rendered brick, with a wooden modillion eaves band and a Welsh slate roof. There are two storeys, an L-shaped plan, a front of four bays, and outshuts at the front and rear. On the front is a porch, some of the windows are bow windows, and the others are sashes.	II
Stables, Bishopthorpe Palace; 53.92325°N 1.09398°W		1761–63	The stables, coach house and dovecote, later two dwellings, are in pinkish-brown brick, with stone dressings, rusticated quoins, a floor band, and a tile roof. The central bay has three storeys, and is flanked by two-storey three-bay ranges, ending in projecting two-storey single-bay wings. In the centre is a segmental-headed carriage entrance with a quoined surround, above which is Venetian window in a round-headed recess breaking into an open pediment. Over this is a semicircular recess containing a blind semicircular panel, and a segmental pediment. The flanking ranges contain similar carriage arches, and on the right range is a doorway with a quoined surround. On the upper floor are sash windows under flat arches of gauged brick. Each outer wing contains a carriage entrance, above which is a Venetian window breaking into an open pediment.	II*
Gatehouse and walls, Bishopthorpe Palace; 53.92280°N 1.09343°W		1763–65	The gatehouse, designed by Thomas Atkinson, is in magnesian limestone and brown stone, with a lead roof. There are two storeys, one bay, and a square plan. It contains a segmental-headed archway with a moulded surround and a coat of arms under an ogee-headed hood mould. Above it is a four-light window with a hood mould, and a clock face in the gable that has an embattled parapet and a modillion cornice. The gatehouse is flanked by angle buttresses rising to crocketed pinnacles. On the hipped roof is an open turret with a conical roof and a weathercock. On each side are embattled walls with four-centred arched openings, and buttresses with pinnacles.	II*
Wall and archway, Bishopthorpe Palace; 53.92281°N 1.09200°W		1763–65	The wall adjoining the house to the right is in magnesian limestone. It is embattled, with an L-shaped plan, and contains cross-shaped slits. In the wall is a round-headed archway with a moulded surround under an ogee-headed hood mould with finials.	II
Folly, Bishopthorpe Palace; 53.92556°N 1.09272°W	—	Mid to late 18th century	The folly in the grounds of the palace is in magnesian limestone, with an interior in pinkish-brown brick, a modillion cornice, and a broken parapet, and it is without a roof. There is a circular plan and a single tall storey. The folly contains a round-arched entrance with a brick surround, three blocked round arches with stone surrounds and keystones, and above one arch is a blocked window.	II
Old St Andrew's Church; 53.92232°N 1.09126°W		1766	Only the west front of the church has survived, together with the foundations of the other parts. It contains a Tudor arched doorway under a hood mould, above which is a three-light pointed window with a hood mould. On each side is an ogee-headed niche with crockets and a finial. The front is flanked by angle buttresses with crocketed pinnacles, the gable has an embattled parapet, and on the centre is a bell turret with a cross finial.	II
Kitchen gardens, buildings and stream, Bishopthorpe Palace; 53.92632°N 1.09524°W	—	1767	A heated wall was added to the kitchen garden by 1785. The walls enclose a large rectangular area and a smaller area to the southeast. They are in red brick with stone coping, and are about 12 feet (3.7 m) in height. The south wall of the main garden is heated, and on the north side of the wall are lean-to work sheds with pantile roofs, one containing two furnaces. A canalised stream runs through much of the length of the main garden.	II
The Whitehouse; 53.92207°N 1.09316°W		Early to mid-19th century	The house is in pinkish-brown brick, with painted stucco on the front, on a plinth, with stone dressings, and a hipped Welsh slate roof. It consists of a central block with three storeys and three bays, a left wing with two storeys and two bays, and a right wing with two storeys and three bays. Steps lead up to the central doorway with a radial fanlight, under a projecting Tuscan portico with a segmental hood and a panelled soffit, and the windows are sashes.	II
Stables, wall and gate piers, The Whitehouse; 53.92209°N 1.09274°W	—	Early to mid-19th century	The buildings are in pale brown brick on a plinth, with dressings in red brick and stone. The stables have a slate roof, two storeys and three bays. The middle bay projects under a pediment, it contains a recessed panel in red gauged brick round arch, and above it is a round window with radial glazing and a red brick surround. The outer bays contain sash windows, on the ground floor with flat gauged brick arches, and on the upper floor with segmental arches. The walls have stone coping, and pilaster buttresses on the left. The gate piers on the right have stone caps and ball finials.	II
St Andrew's Church; 53.92378°N 1.09543°W		1898–1902	The church, designed by C. Hodgson Fowler, is in sandstone with a tile roof. It consists of a nave with a clerestory, north and south aisles, a south porch, a chancel with a clerestory, a south aisle and a north vestry, and a west tower. The tower has three stages, diagonal buttresses, two-light bell openings with hood moulds, and an embattled parapet.	II
Bishopthorpe Garth; 53.92482°N 1.10053°W	—	1908	The house, designed by Walter Brierley, is in pinkish-brown brick with moulded sill bands, and a pantile roof with moulded brick decoration to the gables. There is a dog-leg plan, the central range with a single storey and an attic and two bays, a two-storey two-bay wing on the left, and a slightly projecting two-storey single-bay wing to the right. Between the left wing and the centre is a porch, the windows are leaded casements, and on the catslide roof of the centre range is a straight-headed dormer.	II
Garth Cottage and Garth Mews; 53.92472°N 1.10164°W		c. 1908	A pair of cottages by Walter Brierley forming gatehouses to Bishopthorpe Garth. They are in pinkish-brown brick, partly rendered, with a pantile roof. There is a single storey with attics, and six bay, with a central carriage arch, and a three-bay outshut on the right. The windows are casements with moulded sills and header arches. Both cottages have an entrance under a hood, and on the outshut are pilasters.	II
War memorial 53.92302°N 1.09464°W		1921	The war memorial by the entrance to the churchyard of St Andrew's Church is in Portland stone. It consists of a floriated cross head on a tapering column, it is about 2 metres (6 ft 7 in) in height, and stands on a tapered plinth on two steps. On the column, near the base, is a cusped niche with crocketed finials, containing a statuette depicting Saint George and the Dragon. On the plinth are inscriptions and the names of those lost in the two World Wars.	II
