= Bishopthorpe Palace =

Grade I listed building in York, England

Coordinates: 53.9245°N 1.0920°W

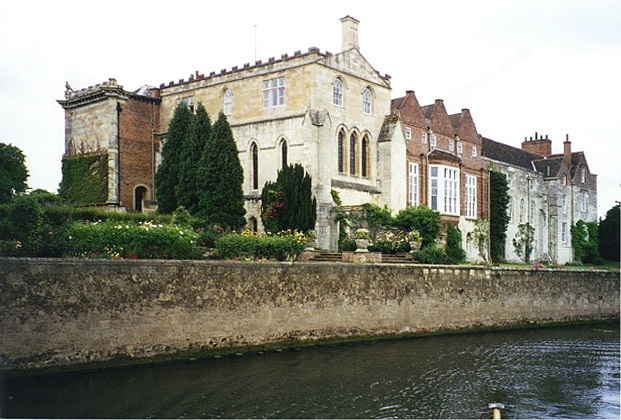
Bishopthorpe Palace viewed from the Ouse, July 1995

Bishopthorpe Palace, City of York

Bishopthorpe Palace is the official residence of the Archbishop of York at Bishopthorpe, North Yorkshire, England. The palace is located on the River Ouse and is approximately 3 miles (4.8 km) south of York, which is the location of the diocese's cathedral, York Minster.

== Background ==
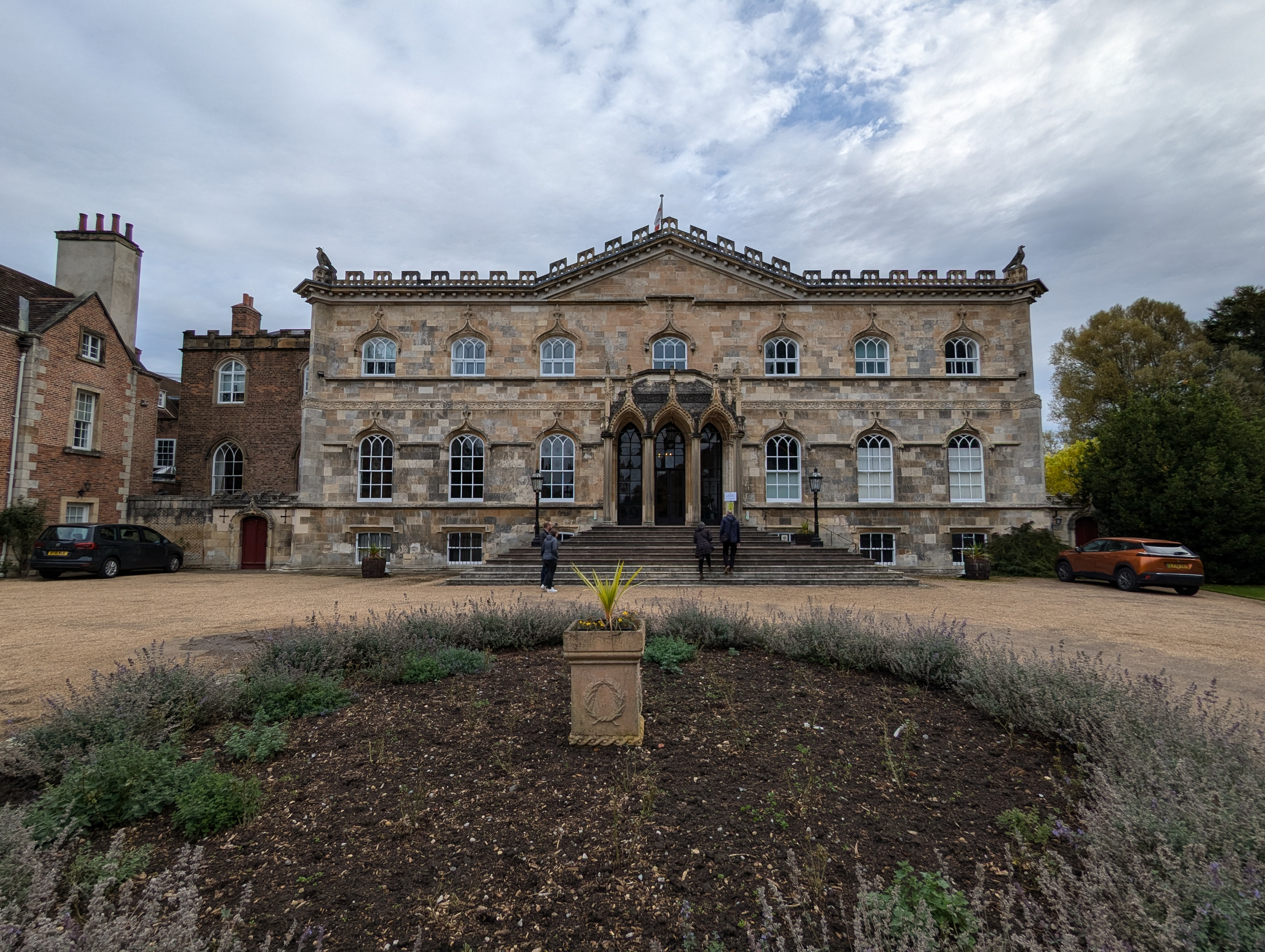
Entrance front of the palace

In 1226, Archbishop Walter de Gray bought the manor house at what was then St. Andrewthorpe and gave it to the Dean and Chapter of York Minster. Since then, the village became known as Bishopthorpe. In 1241 he built a Manor House and Chapel on the site. A red brick north wing was built in the fifteenth century and the Gatehouse was built in 1765. In 1863, a water tower was built to extract water from a well, rather than using river water for drinking. The tower was demolished in 1946 but some foundations are still visible in garden of Iona Lodge.

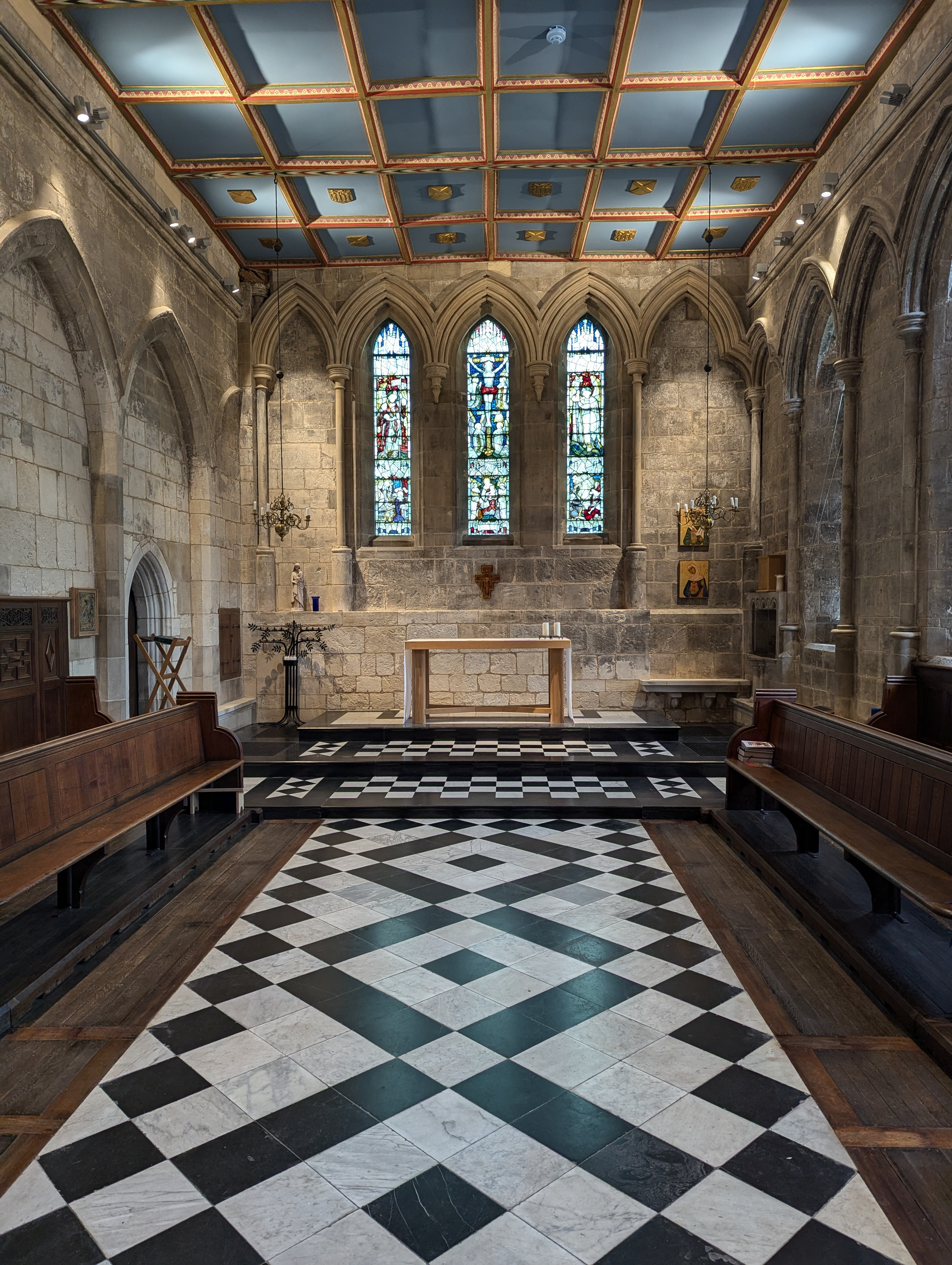
The chapel

The palace is a Grade I listed building in a wooded, rural setting and includes a gatehouse, stables, a brewhouse and brewster's cottage. It was remodelled by Thomas Atkinson between 1763 and 1769.

John Sentamu, who was Archbishop from 2005 to 2020, did not initially move into the palace, as it was just beginning a major renovation and restoration at the time.

== See also ==
- Grade I listed buildings in the City of York
- Listed buildings in Bishopthorpe
