= The Old Rectory, Brandsby =

Grade II* building in North Yorkshire, England

Coordinates: 54°08′27″N 1°05′11″W

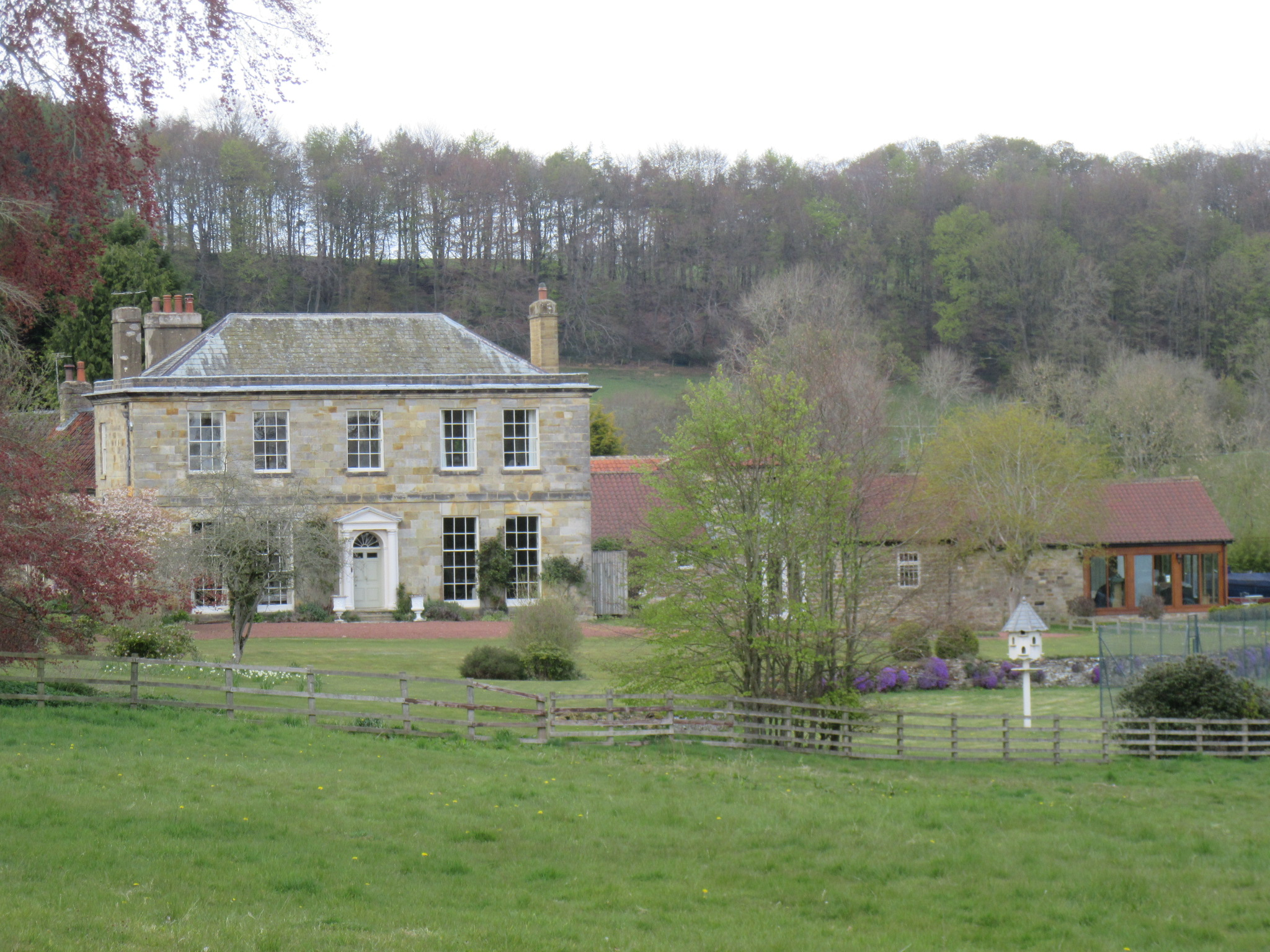
The building, in 2021

The Old Rectory is a historic building in Brandsby-cum-Stearsby, a village in North Yorkshire, in England.

The rectory was originally built in 1565, by Reverend Robert Wilson. It was a long, low building, with a T-shaped plan, and originally had a thatched roof. In 1809, Reverend William Smith commissioned an extension, at right-angles to the original building. The building was sold as a private house in 1938, and it was grade II* listed in 1952. In 2012, it was marketed for sale for £3.25 million. At the time, it had six bedrooms, three reception rooms and three bathrooms, plus two two-bedroom cottages, stables, a former coach house housing a swimming pool, and 18 acres of land.

The house is built of sandstone. The original part has a red and blue pantile roof, two storeys, seven bays, and a rear outshut. It contains double-chamfered mullioned windows with four-centred arched lights and sunken spandrels. The later range, containing the main front, has a hipped Westmorland slate roof, two storeys and five bays. It is on a plinth, and has a floor band, a cornice and a parapet. In the centre is a portico with Tuscan half-columns and a pediment, and a doorway with a traceried fanlight. The windows are sashes with cantilevered lintels and keystones.

== See also ==
- Grade II* listed buildings in North Yorkshire (district)
- Listed buildings in Brandsby-cum-Stearsby
