= Old St Andrew's Church, Bishopthorpe =

Grade II listed church in York, England

Coordinates: 53.9223°N 1.0910°W

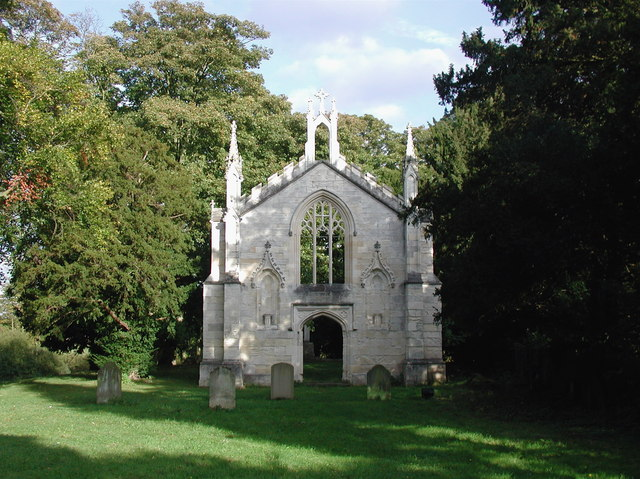
The ruin, in 2007

Old St Andrew's Church is a ruined building in Bishopthorpe, a village south of York in England.

The first church on the site was built in the early 13th century. It was cruciform, and had a central tower. By 1768, it was in very poor condition, and was demolished on the orders of Robert Hay Drummond, with only its foundations retained. He commissioned Thomas Atkinson to design a new church, which was largely built of brick, and retained the cruciform plan. Its windows were relocated from the chapel at Cawood Castle, and their glass was designed by William Wailes. However, located next to the River Ouse, it regularly flooded.

In 1842, Edward Venables-Vernon-Harcourt paid £2,000 to replace the roof and floor, add a south vestry, and porches to each transept. He also built a stone wall on the riverbank, to reduce the risk of floods. Gas lighting was added in 1868, a new organ was installed in 1870, and the pews were replaced in 1872. In 1892, the church suffered a further major flood, and it was decided to build a new St Andrew's Church, away from the river. The new church was completed in 1899, and the old church was largely demolished, with just the west front retained. In 1985, the ruin was Grade II listed.

The ruin is built of brick, covered in Magnesian Limestone. It is in the Gothick style, including a Tudor-style central doorway, with a three-light pointed window above. Other than the west front, the foundations of the nave, transepts and chancel survive, as does the head of one window.

== See also ==
- Listed buildings in Bishopthorpe
