= Ebor Inn =

Listed pub in North Yorkshire, England

- The pub in 2025, prior to reopening in 2026
- Former names: Brown Cow
- Alternative names: The Ebor

General information
- Type: Public house
- Location: 46 Main Street, Bishopthorpe, North Yorkshire, England
- Coordinates: 53°55′17″N 1°05′44″W
- Year built: Mid-18th century
- Renovated: 19th and 20th century (altered and added)
- Owner: Samuel Smith's

Design and construction
- Designations

Listed Building – Grade II
- Official name: The Ebor Inn
- Designated: 12 July 1985
- Reference no.: 1316652

The Ebor Inn is a Grade II listed public house on Main Street in Bishopthorpe, a village in the City of York, England. The mid‑18th‑century building, altered in the 19th and 20th centuries, was trading as the Brown Cow by 1822 and had adopted the name The Ebor by 1881. It was added to the Bishopthorpe conservation area in 1989. The pub was run by Gordon Watkins for nearly forty years until his death in 2021, after which it saw periods of closure. Internal alterations were approved in 2025, and Samuel Smith's subsequently renovated the building. The pub reopened in mid‑May 2026.

== History ==
The building is a mid-18th‑century inn with later 19th and 20th‑century alterations and additions. It had become a public house by at least 1822, when it traded as the Brown Cow, and by 1881 it was known as The Ebor.

On 12 July 1985, the Ebor Inn was designated a Grade II listed building, and in 1989 the site was included within the newly established Bishopthorpe conservation area.

The Ebor was run by Gordon Watkins for almost forty years until his death in March 2021. The pub then remained shut before reopening in March 2024 under new management, but it closed again in 2025. In July 2025 a planning application was submitted for internal changes, including reinstating a wall in the tap room, reducing the size of the lobby and relocating the bar servery, and the scheme received approval in September. Samuel Smith's, the freehold owner as of October 2026, subsequently carried out renovation work on the building, including removing the white render to reveal the original brick. Following this work, Watkins's daughter, Sally Watkins, became the licensee, and the pub reopened in mid‑May 2026.

== Architecture ==
The rendered pub in 2020

The building was rendered and whitewashed when it was listed, with a Welsh slate roof. It has an L‑shaped layout, later extended to link with an 18th‑century stable block at the rear, and has 20th‑century additions at the front and back. It has two storeys, with four windows on the upper floor. The entrance sits between the second and third windows. On the ground floor there are two 16‑pane sash windows and a three‑part bow window, the centre section having 20 panes and the side sections ten panes each. The first floor has two bow windows with 20 panes to the left and two 16‑pane sash windows to the right. A timber band runs along the eaves, and there are chimneys at the end and to the rear. A three‑part sash window is set into the back of the building.

== See also ==
- Listed buildings in Bishopthorpe
