= Middlethorpe Hall =

Listed building near York, England

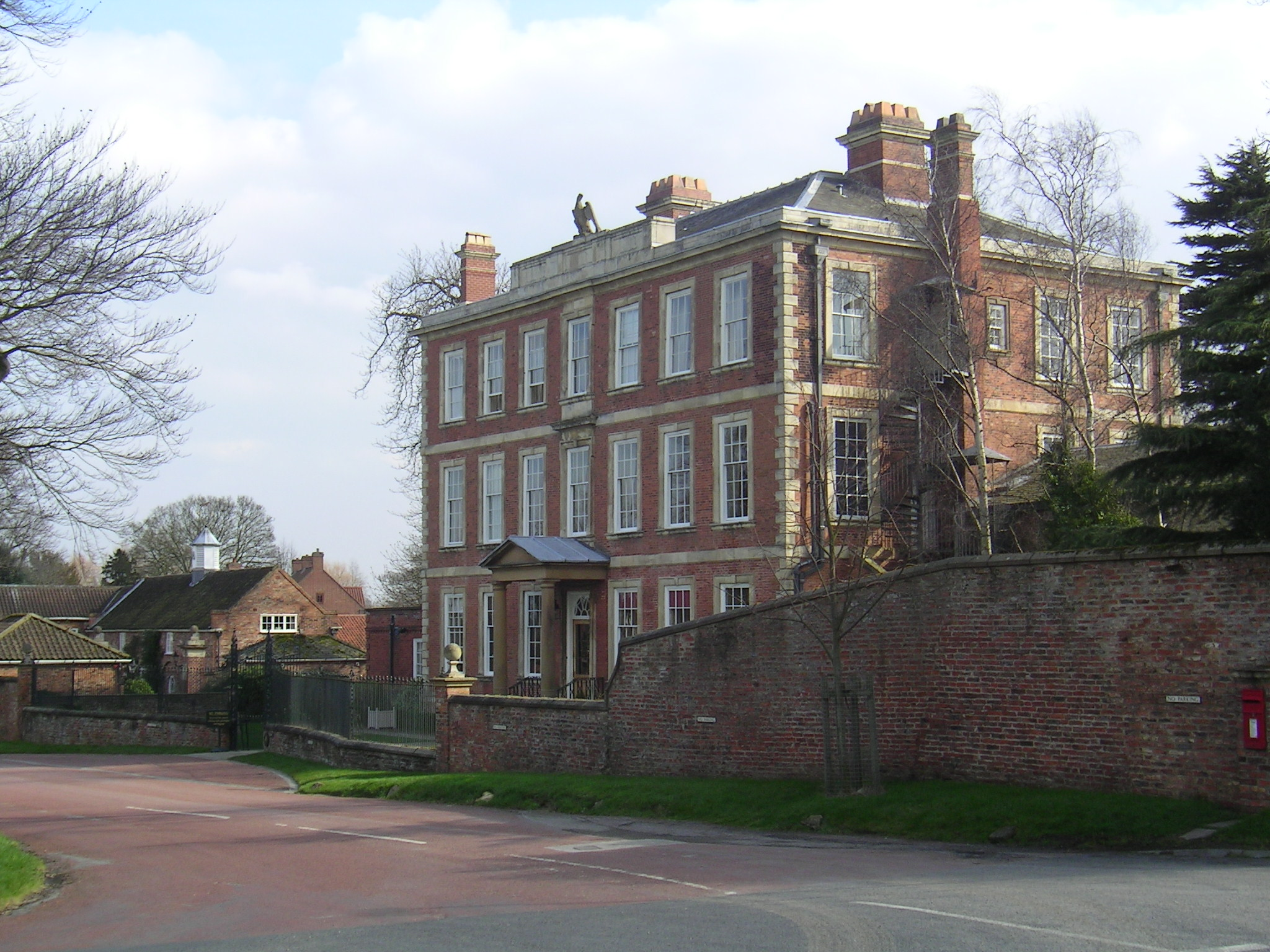

General information
- Location: Bishopthorpe, York, England
- Coordinates: 53°55′50″N 1°05′24″W
- Completed: c. 1700
- Renovated: Mid-18th century (flanking wings); Early 19th century (altered extensively); 20th century (alterations) c. 1980 (restored)
- Owner: National Trust

Technical details
- Floor count: 2

Design and construction
- Designations

Listed Building – Grade II*
- Official name: Middlethorpe Hall
- Designated: 14 June 1954
- Reference no.: 1259554

Website
- www.middlethorpe.com

Middlethorpe Hall is a 17th-century English country house standing in 20 acres (8 ha) of grounds in Middlethorpe, York, North Yorkshire. It is a perfectly symmetrical red brick and stone house built in 1699 and since 2008 has been owned by the National Trust. It is currently used as a hotel.

== Description ==
The house is quite close to the road which is unusual for its architectural standard. Like many grand houses of the time, it is influenced indirectly by Sir Christopher Wren, especially Hampton Court Palace with a similar horizontal skyline and pattern of red brick, white sash windows and stone quoins and window surrounds. The north entrance front of seven bays and three storeys plus a basement is surrounded by a stone eagle, the Barlow family crest. The pedimented porch over the front door is an early 19th-century addition and the curved railings and gates enclosing the forecourt were added in 1983.

The south front, the main façade of the house, is surmounted by a raised stone parapet of three panels containing carved festoons and crowned by another stone eagle. It is more impressive than the north front because of the flanking wings added in the mid-18th century by Francis Barlow. The bays of these single storey additions are divided by pilasters with well carved composite capitals and are surmounted by a balustraded parapet.

The front door leads straight into the stone-flagged entrance hall, as in a medieval house. Beyond to the south is a carved oak staircase with fluted and foliated balusters, a York motif, standing on steps with scrolled panelled ends. The staircase is supported by a Corinthian column and may have been moved at some point. The floor is paved with black and white marble squares. There is a panelled drawing room leading to an enormous ballroom occupying the western of the two wings added c. 1750. The dining room dates from the original period and has round head panels flanked by Ionic pilasters.

== History ==
The house was built in c. 1699–1701 for Thomas Barlow, a prosperous master cutler who bought the Middlethorpe estate in 1698 as a bid to establish himself as a country gentleman. In 1712, Thomas Barlow and his son Francis went on the Grand Tour and let the house in August 1713 for a year to Lady Mary Wortley and her Daughter Lady Mary Anne Wortley who married John Stuart Montague 3rd Earl of Bute in 1736 in their absence. Francis later served as High Sheriff of Yorkshire in 1734–36.

The house descended in the Barlow family to Frances Barlow, who married Manchester based physician Matthew Alexander Eason Wilkinson (1813–1878) and moved away. Frances Wilkinson died after a brief marriage but her husband and his second wife Louisa Letitia, née Walker (c. 1826–1889) lived at the hall with their six children. The gardens at Middlethorpe Hall are credited with inspiring the career of their daughter Fanny Wilkinson, the first professional female landscape designer in Britain.

For most of the 19th and early 20th century, the house remained in the Wilkinson family but was let to various tenants. From 1851 it was occupied by a girls' boarding school for 30 years. In 1972, it became "Brummels" night club.

In 1980, it was acquired by Historic House Hotels, who improved and restored the grounds and outbuildings with hundreds of trees planted and the addition of a ha-ha and lake. A dilapidated late 17th-century dovecote was restored, the kitchen garden was replanted, and stable buildings were converted and extended for additional hotel accommodation.

The hall and grounds were then gifted to the National Trust by the directors of Historic House Hotels (HHH). The hall continues its present use as a hotel under the existing HHH management. Three National Trust directors joined the HHH board and all profits will go to Trust funds to provide for the long-term care of the house. The gift had been under discussion for almost 30 years and in 1997 the National Trust accepted restrictive covenants over the property.

Trustees of the National Trust completed the transfer deal in September 2008 by declaring the hall together with two other properties inalienable. It is envisaged that arrangements will be put in place for the gardens and grounds of the hall to be open to visitors, along with tours of the ground floor rooms. Members of the Trust are welcome as hotel guests, as are members of the public.

== See also ==
- Grade II* listed buildings in the City of York
- Listed buildings in Bishopthorpe
