= Bishopthorpe Garth =

House in York, North Yorkshire, England

Coordinates: 53°55′29″N 1°06′02″W

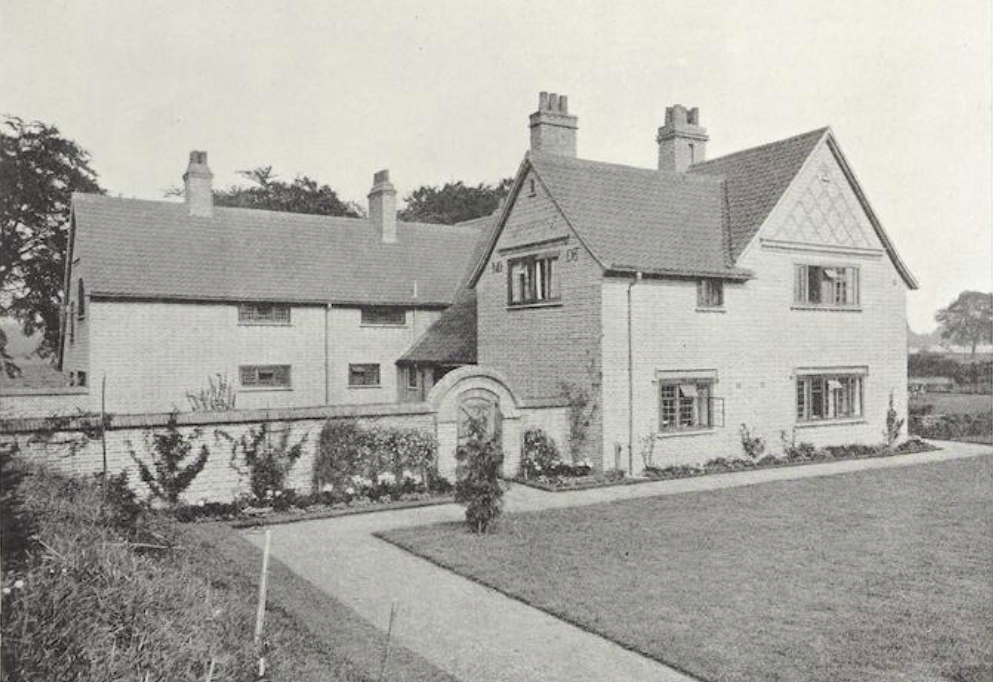
The house, in 1912

Bishopthorpe Garth is a grade II listed house on the edge of Bishopthorpe, a village south of York, in England.

The house was designed by 1908 by Walter Brierley, for the colliery owner Arthur Toward Wilson. Patrick Nuttgens described it as a precursor of Brierley's work at Goddards House and Garden. Its gardens were designed by Gertrude Jekyll. Brierley also designed a gatehouse on Sim Balk Lane, consisting of two cottages with a carriage arch between them. The house was requisitioned by the army during the Second World War and remained vacant until the 1950s. Various additions to the house were made over the years, and both the house and gatehouse were grade II listed in 1985. In the early 2000s, it was owned by Kevin Linfoot, a property developer. In 2022, it was placed on the market for £4.75 million, although this was later reduced to £3.5 million, including the gatehouse.

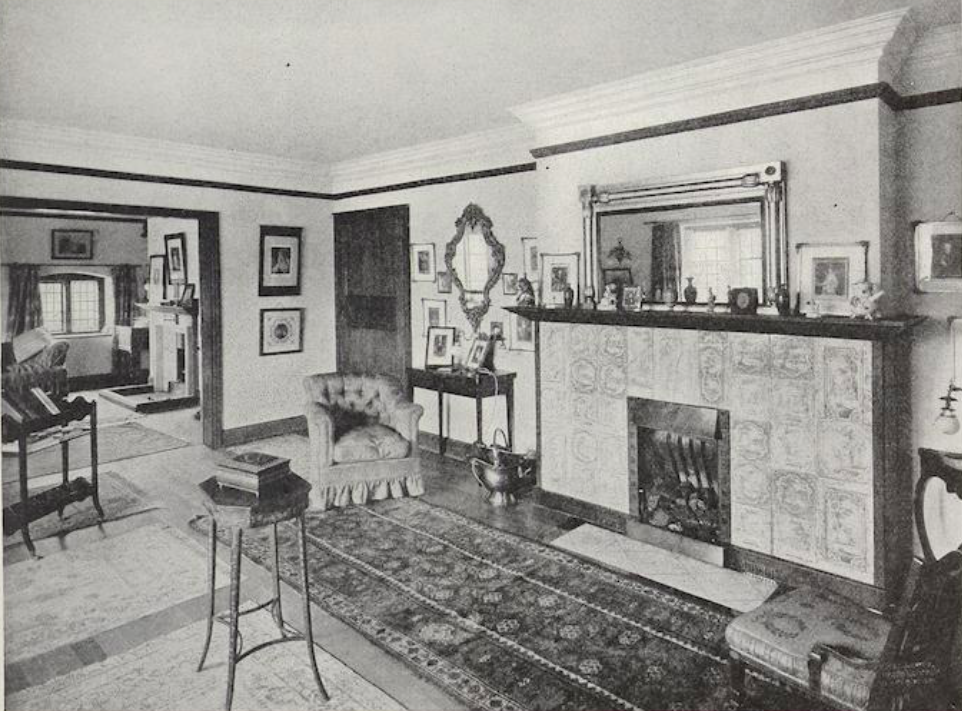
Interior view, in 1912

The arts and crafts house is built of hand-made bricks, some with mouldings, and a pantile roof. It has two wings with two storeys, the left-hand one of two bays, and the right-hand one of a single bay. The central section is also of two bays, with a single main storey and an attic. The entrance is through a panelled oak door, and the windows throughout are leaded casements. The interior is partly in the Jacobethan style, with many original features, including an open-well oak staircase.

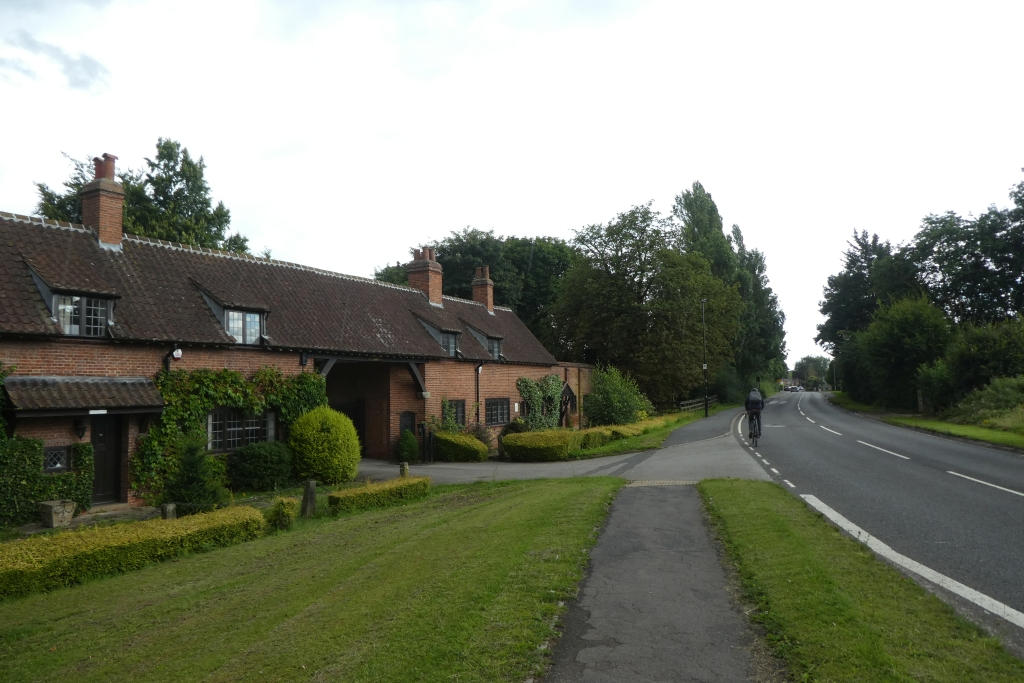
The gatehouse

The gatehouse is similarly built of hand-made brick, with some render, and a pantile roof. It is a single storey, with an attic, and the walls bow towards the carriage entrance.

== See also ==
- Listed buildings in Bishopthorpe
