= St Andrew's Church, Bishopthorpe =

Grade II listed church in York, England

Coordinates: 53°55′25″N 1°05′44″W

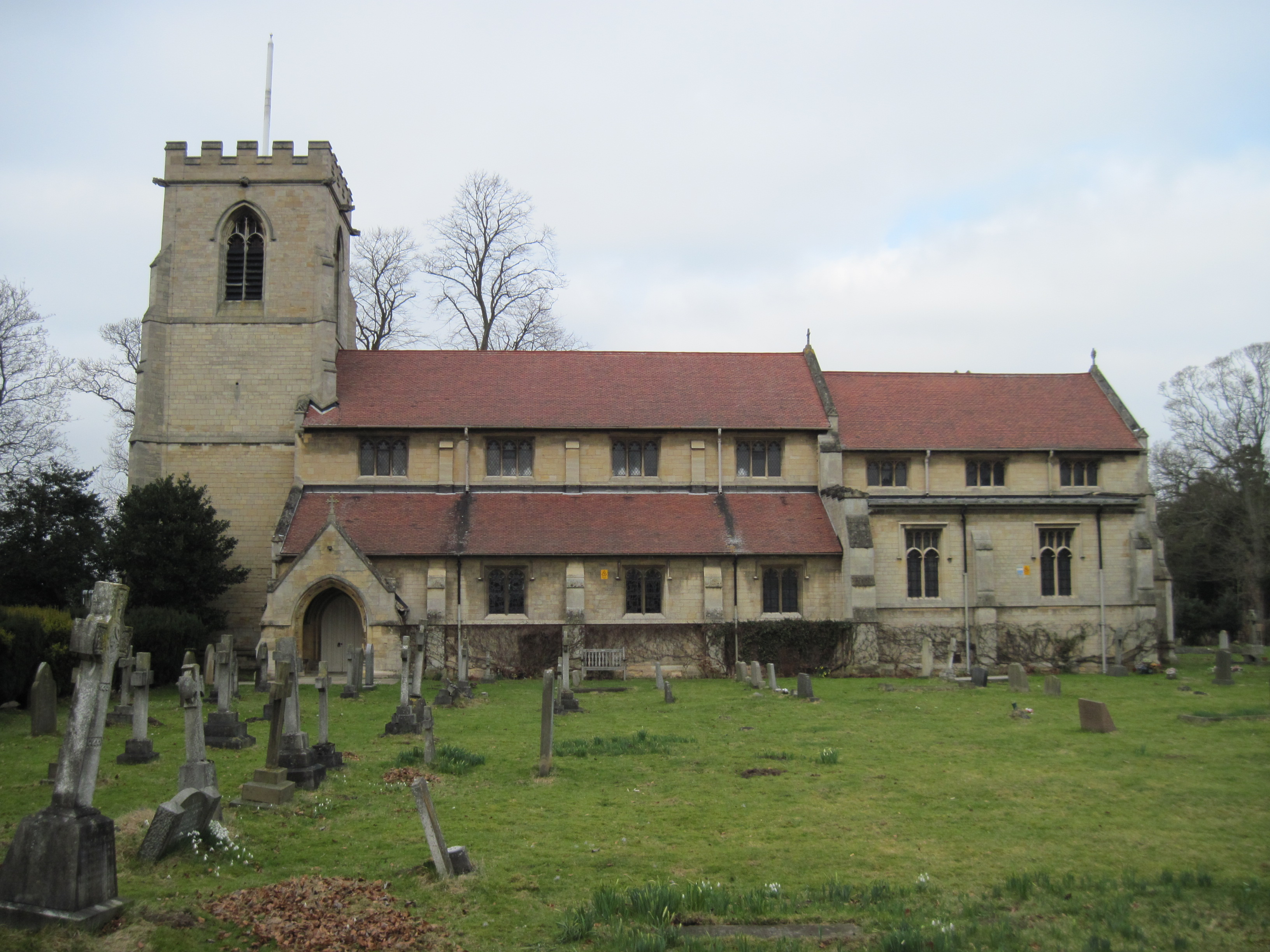
The church, in 2010

St Andrew's Church is the parish church of Bishopthorpe, a village in the City of York in England.

Bishopthorpe had a church from the 13th century, with Old St Andrew's Church dating from 1768. However, the building regularly flooded, and following a major inundation in 1892, it was decided to construct a new building, on a site further from the river. It was designed by C. Hodgson Fowler, and work started in February 1898. In December, the Archbishop of York ascended scaffolding to affix a cross to the gable end of the roof. The church was consecrated on 25 July 1899. The construction cost £5,893, more than budgeted, which meant that more fundraising was required before a tower could be added. Ultimately, the archbishop personally paid for a tower, which was constructed in 1903.

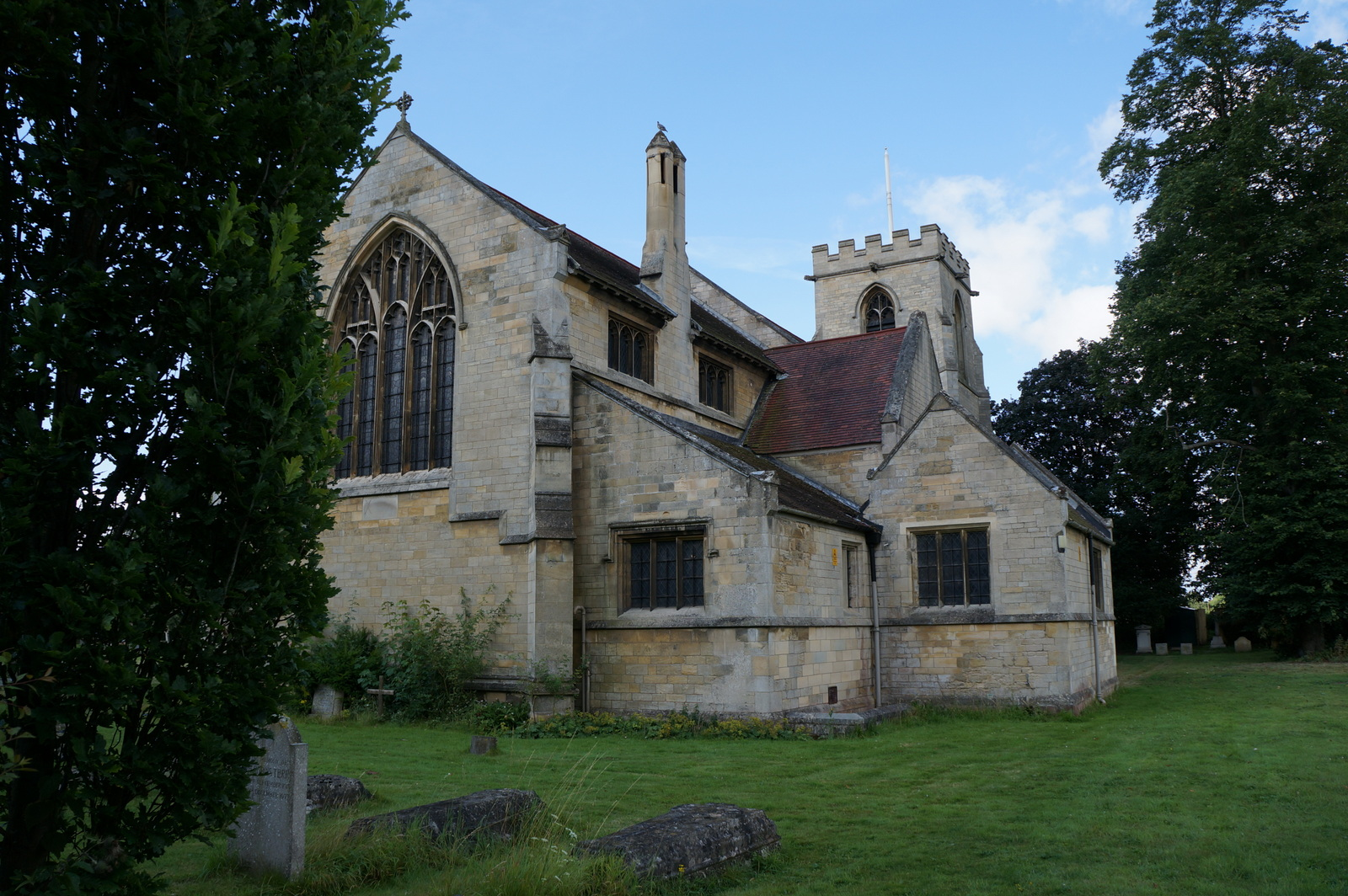
The building from the north-east, in 2014

View from the nave into the chancel

The church is built of sandstone, with a tile roof. It is in the Gothic Revival style. It consists of a nave with aisles, a south porch, and a chancel with a south aisle and north vestry. There is a tower at the west end, with three stages, diagonal buttresses, and battlements. Most of the windows have Perpendicular tracery. It has been Grade II listed since 1985.

== See also ==
- Listed buildings in Bishopthorpe
