= All Saints' Church, Brandsby =

Grade II* listed church in North Yorkshire, England

Coordinates: 54°08′23″N 1°05′08″W

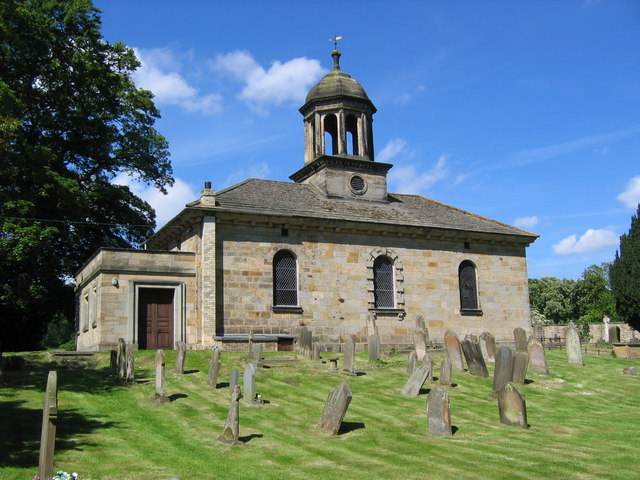
The church, in 2006

All Saints' Church is the parish church of Brandsby-cum-Stearsby, a village in North Yorkshire, in England.

Brandsby was recorded in the Domesday Book as having a church. The Mediaeval church was demolished in the 1760s, and replaced by a building on a new site. It was commissioned by Frances Cholmeley of Brandsby Hall, and designed by Thomas Atkinson, who had previously designed the hall. Work started in 1767, and the building was completed in 1770. In 1905, the building was restored by Temple Moore, and in 1913, a baptistry, porch and vestry were added by H. Rutherford. The church was Grade II* listed in 1960.

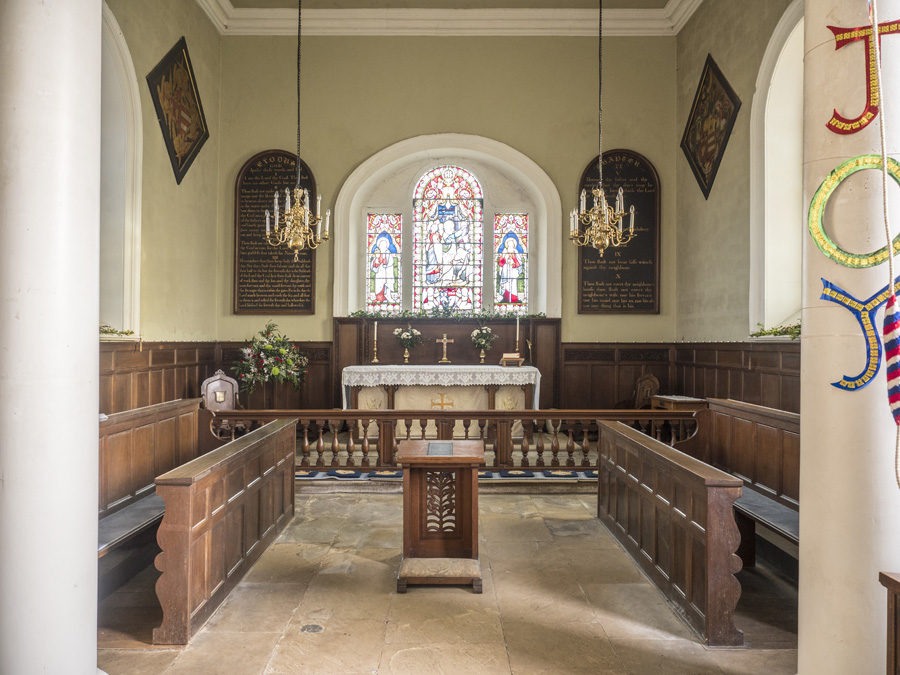
View into the chancel

The church is built of sandstone with a hipped stone slate roof, and consists of a nave and a chancel with three bays in one range, a south porch and a vestry. Over the middle bay is a cupola with an oculus in the square base, eight round-arched openings with three-quarter columns, a Doric frieze, and a stone dome with a ball finial and a weathervane. The windows on the sides of the church have round-arched heads, some with Gibbs surrounds, and at the east end is a Venetian window. The glass in the west window is by Charles Eamer Kempe, while the oak pulpit and lectern are by Temple Moore.

== See also ==
- Grade II* listed churches in North Yorkshire (district)
- Listed buildings in Brandsby-cum-Stearsby
