= Bishopthorpe =

Village and civil parish in North Yorkshire, England

Coordinates: 53°55′11″N 1°05′54″W

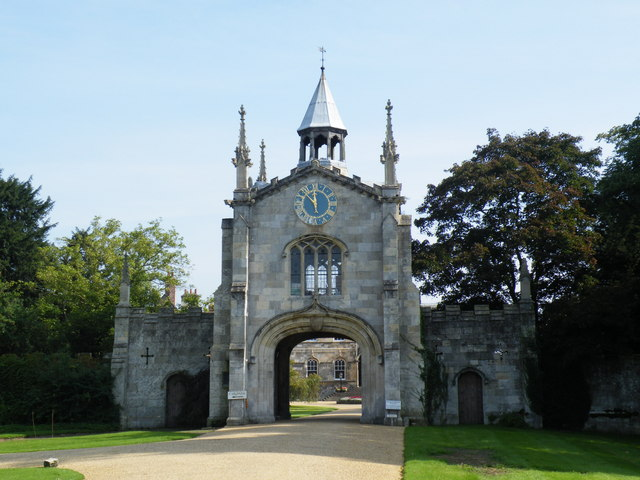
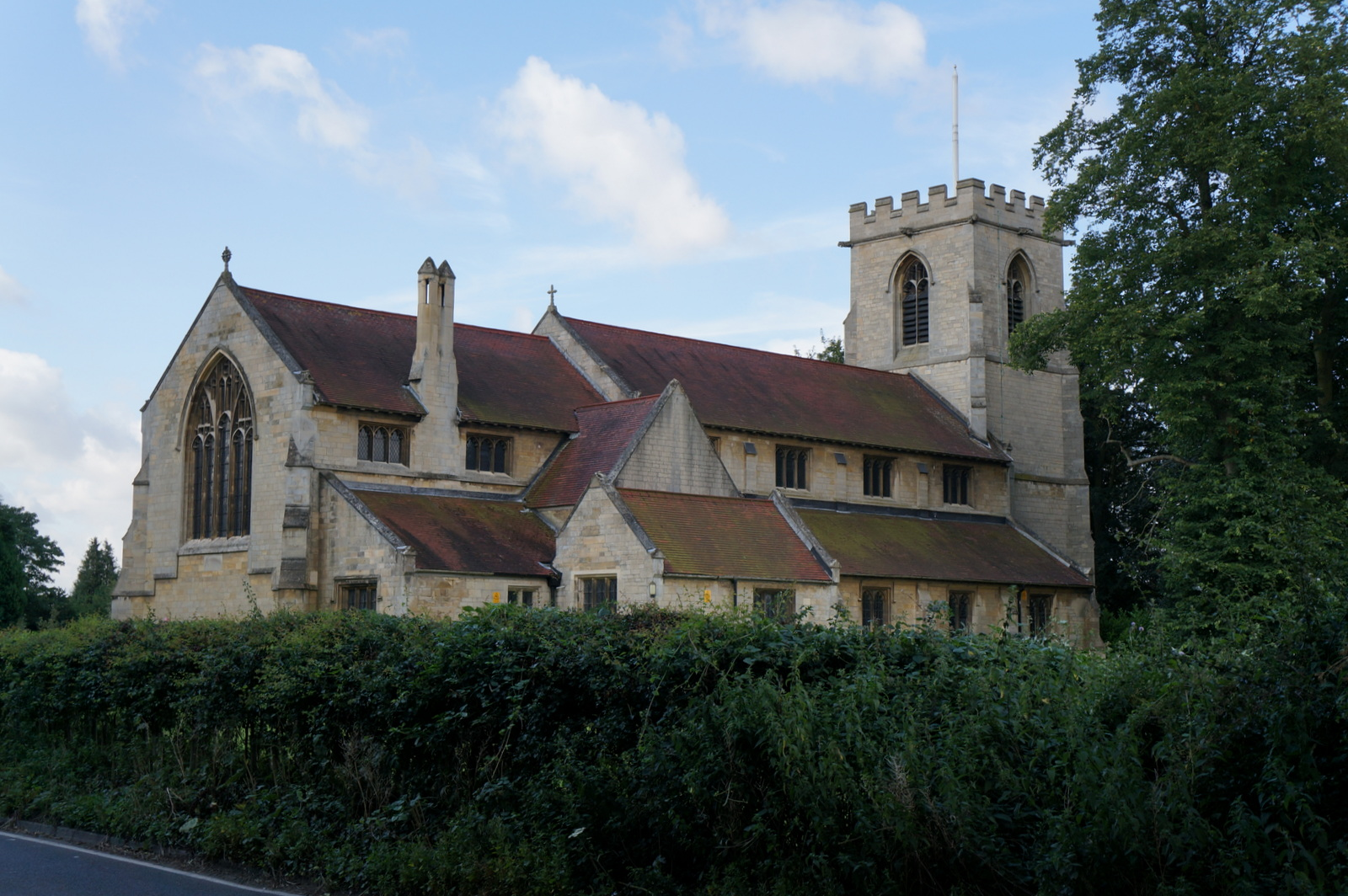
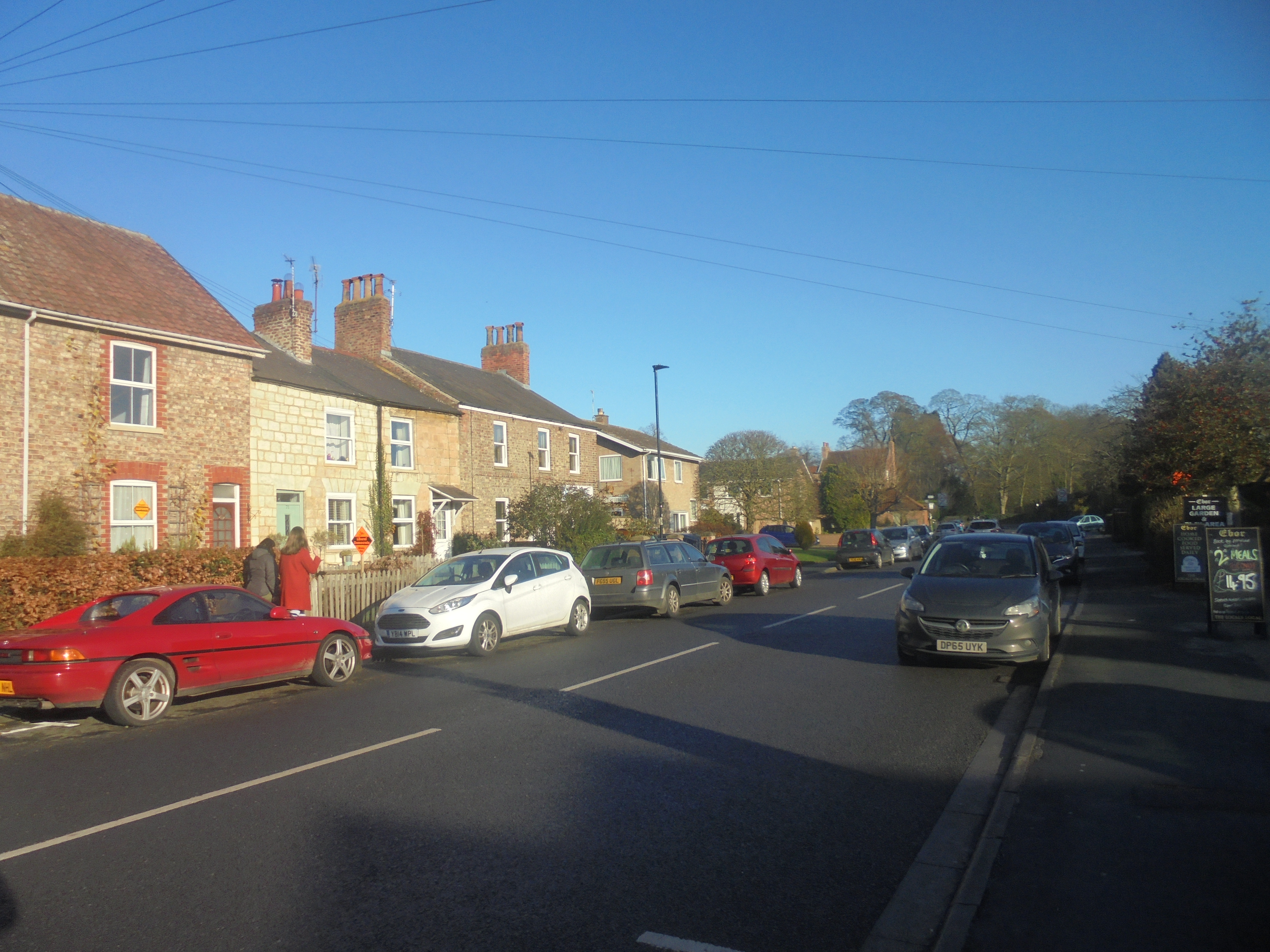
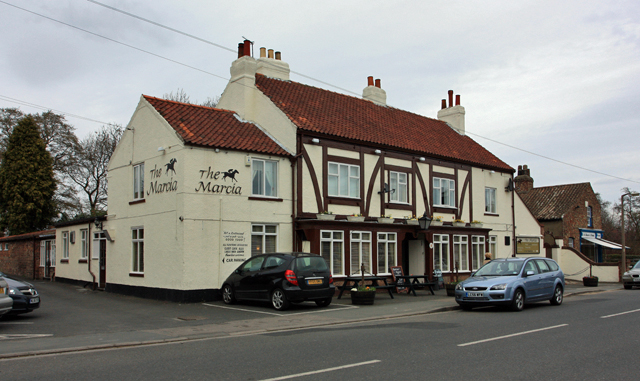
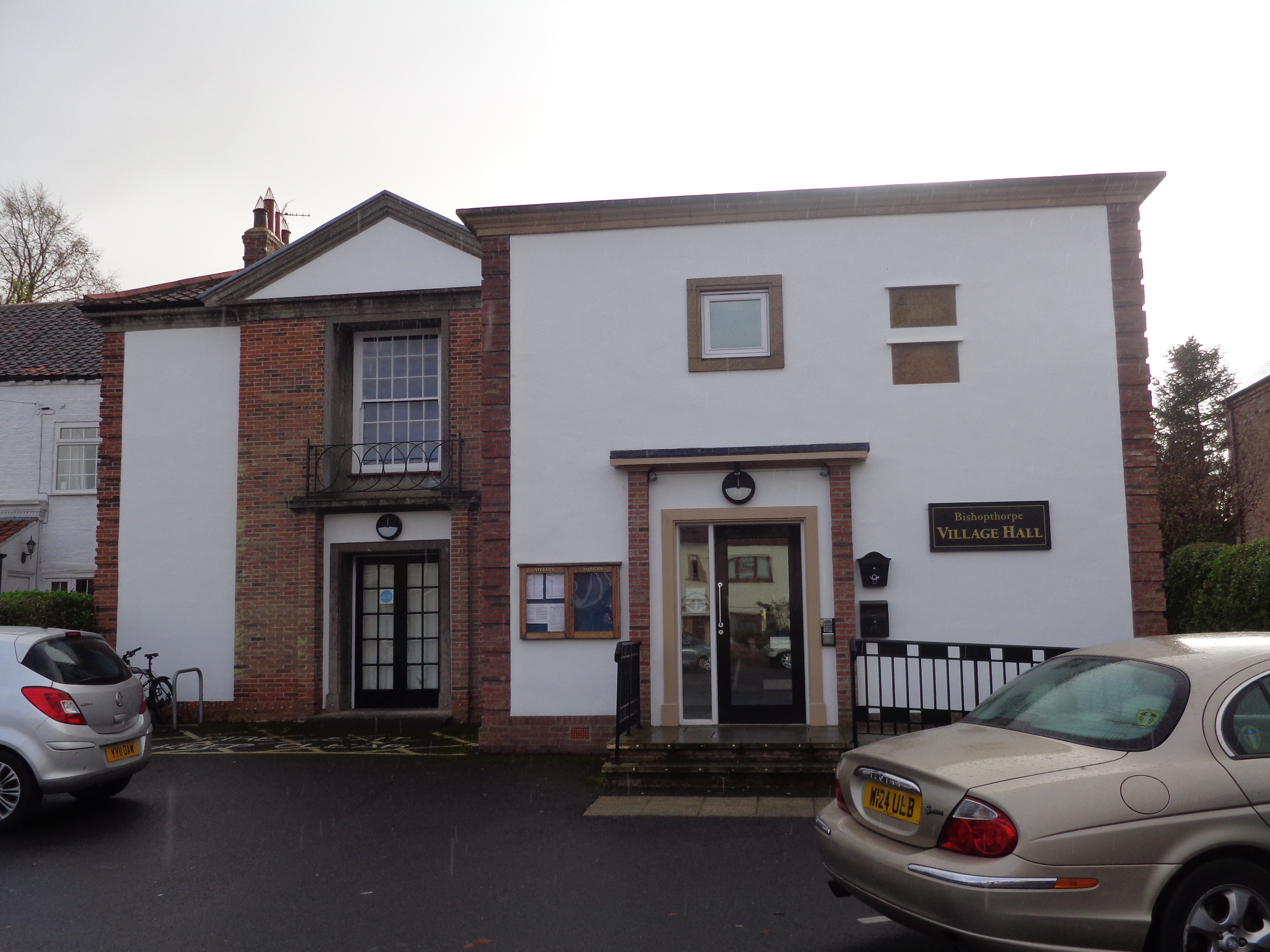
- The Palace Parish Church Main Street The Marcia Village Hall

- Location within North Yorkshire
- Population: 3,237 (2011 census)
- OS grid reference: SE590473
- Civil parish: Bishopthorpe
- Unitary authority: City of York
- Ceremonial county: North Yorkshire
- Region: Yorkshire and the Humber
- Country: England
- Sovereign state: United Kingdom
- Post town: YORK
- Postcode district: YO23
- Dialling code: 01904
- Police: North Yorkshire
- Fire: North Yorkshire
- Ambulance: Yorkshire
- UK Parliament: York Outer

Bishopthorpe is a village and civil parish three miles south of York in the City of York unitary authority area and ceremonial county of North Yorkshire, England. Bishopthorpe is close to the River Ouse, and has a population of 3,174, increasing to 3,237 at the 2011 Census. The area of Main Street and the Palace were made a conservation area in 1989 along with other open areas of the village.

The village was historically part of the West Riding of Yorkshire until 1974. It was then a part of the district of Selby District in North Yorkshire from 1974 until 1996. Since 1996 it has been part of the City of York unitary authority.

It was formerly known as St Andrewthorpe, but in the 13th century, Archbishop Walter de Grey bought the manor house and gave it to the Dean and Chapter of York Minster. This became Bishopthorpe Palace, the residence of the Archbishop of York. Many of the roads in Bishopthorpe are named after past Archbishops.

== History ==
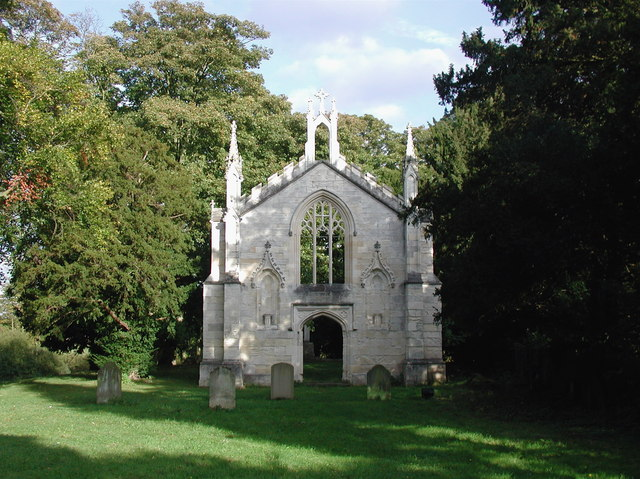
Old St Andrew's Church

The village is mentioned in the Domesday Book of 1086, where it is referred to as Torp/Thorpe or Badetorps, depending on which translation is used. It came to be known as Thorp-super-Usam or Thorpe-on-Ouse in 1194. By 1275 the earliest written record of the name Bishopthorpe, spelt "Biscupthorpe", appears in documents. In 1202, the Prior and monks of St Andrew’s at Fishergate built the first church here and dedicated it to their patron saint. The name Thorp-super-Usam was therefore gradually superseded by Andrewthorpe or Thorpe St. Andrew. In 1226, Archbishop Walter de Gray bought property which once belonged to the Abbot of Kirkstall Abbey and the Priory of St. Andrews. By the year 1241, Archbishop Gray had built a Manor House and Chapel by the river. He conveyed this property to the Dean and Chapter of York, thus ensuring that it remained with successive Archbishops and did not fall into the king's hands during a vacancy.

Bishopthorpe was the site, in 1323, of great council to agree a truce between King Edward II and Robert the Bruce, whose forces had been harrying Yorkshire following the Battle of Bannockburn, ending the Scots’ Great Raid of 1322.

After the 1405 Northern Rising, Archbishop Scrope was accused of being a traitor by Henry IV and was beheaded in a field near the nunnery of St Clements, now Clementhorpe. In 1763, Archbishop Drummond transformed the Palace by building the now familiar 'Strawberry Gothick' west front and gatehouse. Controversy surrounding the 1832 Reform Bill saw rioters from York attempt to invade the Palace, angered by initial lack of support from Archbishop Harcourt.

Bishopthorpe Inclosure Act 1757
- Act of Parliament
- Parliament of Great Britain
- Long title: An Act for establishing and rendering effectual certain Articles of Agreement, for the dividing and enclosing the Common Fields, Common Meadow Grounds, and Common or Waste, in the Township of Bishopthorpe, in the County of the City of York; and for other Purposes therein mentioned.
- Citation: 30 Geo. 2. c. 32 Pr.
- Territorial extent: Great Britain

Dates
- Royal assent: 6 May 1757
- Commencement: 2 December 1756 (Note: Start of session.)

Status: Current legislation

The Bishopthorpe Inclosure Act 1757 (30 Geo. 2. c. 32 Pr.) saw common land enclosed, thus placing strictures on where local people could graze their animals.

In 1763, a school was founded by local yeoman, Charles Crosby and supported by the parish. The twenty boys and girls were taught to read and write and "instructed in the principles of the Christian religion." In 1846, Archbishop Harcourt built a new village school. The former school, built in 1763 and situated in School Lane, was used as a girls' school and a house for the master, but was divided into three houses in the 1890s.

The main line of the North Eastern Railway was being constructed in 1871 and cut through the west end of the parish running east of Bridge Road.

In 1894, Bishopthorpe became part of the Bishopthorpe Rural District, a rural district which was abolished in 1937 by a County Review Order. In 1895, Bishopthorpe Parish Council was formed.

Bishopthorpe Garth was designed by Walter Brierley in 1908. The War Memorial was erected in 1921 to parish men who made the supreme sacrifice during the First World War.

The Almshouses, built in 1846 by the Archbishop of York Edward Venables-Vernon-Harcourt, were demolished in 1963 due to their deterioration and the need to widen the increasingly busy junction at Sim Balk Lane and Main Street.

== Governance, demography and economy ==
=== Governance ===
Bishopthorpe lies in the Ward of the same name of Unitary Authority of the City of York. It forms part of the UK Parliamentary Constituency of York Outer. The Ward also includes the nearby Village of Acaster Malbis. As of the 2023 elections it is represented by Councillor Michael Nicholls, Conservative.

=== Demography ===
By 1801 the population was 218 and by 1901 it had risen to 439 (104 houses) centred on Main Street and Chantry Lane. J Simpson began building houses in the 1930s. Later developer were Bradley Homes and Shepherd Homes who built on the defunct railway land in the 1980s.

In 1971 the village population of 2,350 almost doubles due to house building during the 1960s on the Bradley Estate in Acaster Lane. By 1949, the first council houses, made up of twenty semi-detached dwellings, were built in the village in Maple Avenue. The 2001 census showed that the population was 3,174. There were 1,424 dwellings, of which 33.9% were detached and 62.3% were semi-detached or terraced. House ownership was recorded at 86.9%. The largest Age Group within the population, 29.5%, were between 45 and 64 years old with 25.3% between 25 and 44 years old. Of the population aged between 16 and 74 years old, 64.99% declared they were in some form of employment and 31.1% said they were retired. The 2011 census recorded the population as 3,237.

=== Economy ===
Bishopthorpe has been a traditional farming community, though nowadays it serves as a commuter base for workers in nearby York and Leeds. There is a range of retail shops including a Post office.

== Culture and community ==
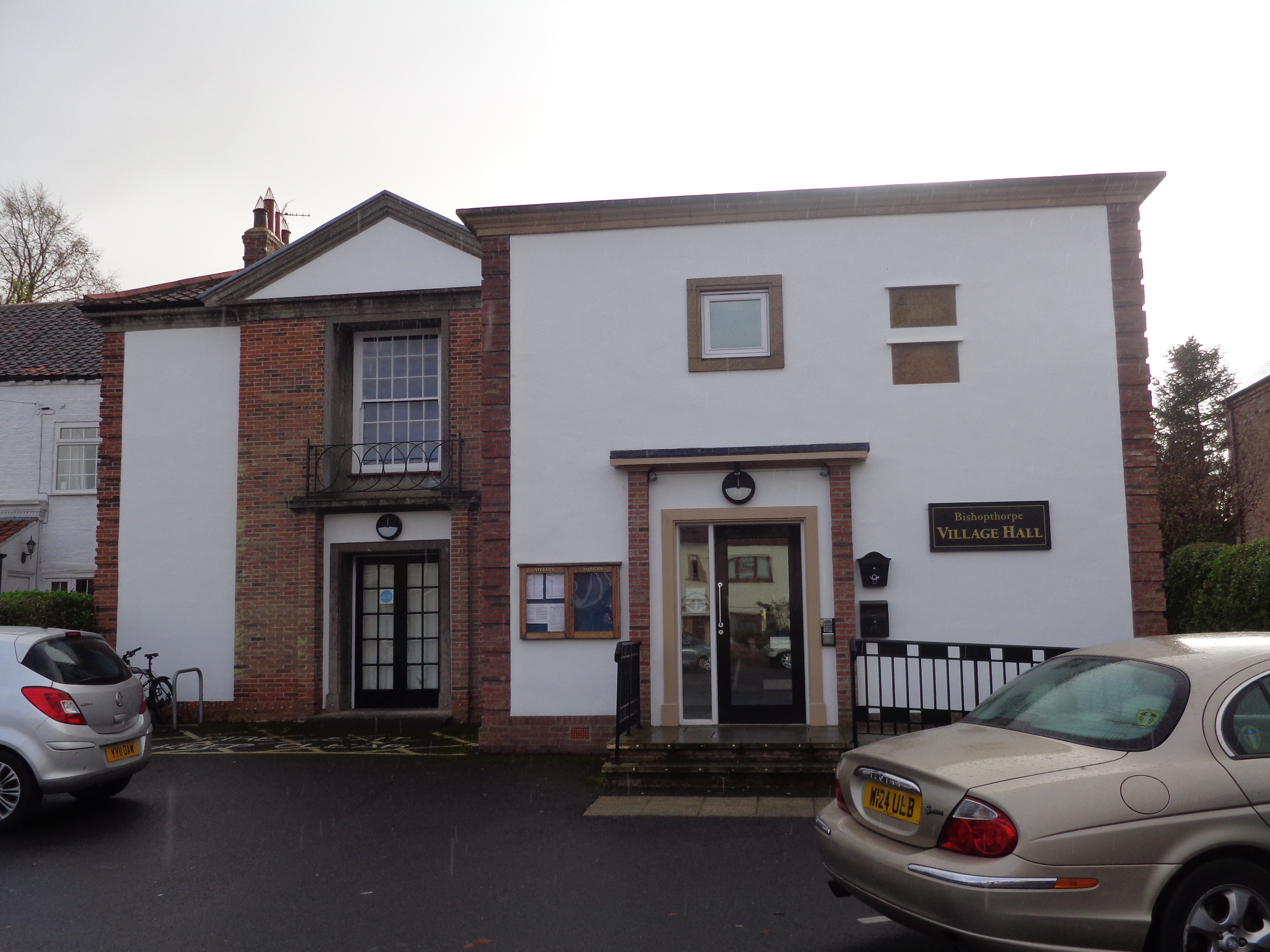
Bishopthorpe Village Hall.

There are three pubs in the village. The Ebor Inn, previously known as the Brown Cow, takes its name from Eboracum, the Roman name for York, reopened in mid-May 2026 after a period of closure and renovation. The other two are The Marcia (previously known as The Grey Mare) and The Woodman. There is also the Bishopthorpe Sports and Social Club, which between 1949 and 1966 hosted the York Model Engineers, who installed an open-air ride-on miniature railway in the grounds.

In 1969, Vernon House, the specially built community centre for Bishopthorpe's elderly people, was officially opened. It provided a place of rest and recreation, and a kitchen and laundry. It was erected at a cost of £7,000 by Tadcaster Rural District Council to complement the area of sheltered accommodation in the village built two years earlier in Maple Avenue and Vernon Close.

In 1968, Bishopthorpe Library opened. The former library was held in the air raid shelter which was built on the same site in the Second World War. The site was formerly the village green where fairs were held for the annual two-day Trinity Feast in June.

In 1904, the Reading Room funded by Archbishop Maclagan was built as a place of rest and recreation for local men, but without the sale of alcohol. A trust was set up whereby a committee administered the building. In 1947 gas fire heaters (replacing the old open coal fires) were installed and in 1949 further works started that saw a proper stage installed and other internal renovations. It was used by cubs and brownies and other uses included jumble sales and dances, activities that now take place in St Andrew's Hall. The Bishopthorpe Women's Institute was formed in 1919 and used it as their base. It was re-furbished in 1950 and was renamed St Andrew's Hall becoming known as the Village Hall.

There are 35 plots on the parish council-run allotments on Acaster Lane, and a further 20 privately-run plots at Glebe Farm on Moor Lane.

=== Culture ===
The first "Bishopthorpe Play" (also known as the Bishopthorpe Pageant) was staged during June 1928 in the grounds of the Bishopthorpe Palace and involved nearly every villager of Bishopthorpe and Acaster Malbis in one way or another. Written Canon F.L. Perkins, the play depicted the history of the two villages since AD211 and each performance was watched by hundreds of people. Additional scenes and music were added for the next production in 1930. Further productions were held in 1954, 1956, 1965 and 1970.

Bishopthorpe features prominently in the novel The Lost Luggage Porter by Andrew Martin. In the book the village is known as "Thorpe on Ouse" and is where the main character resides.

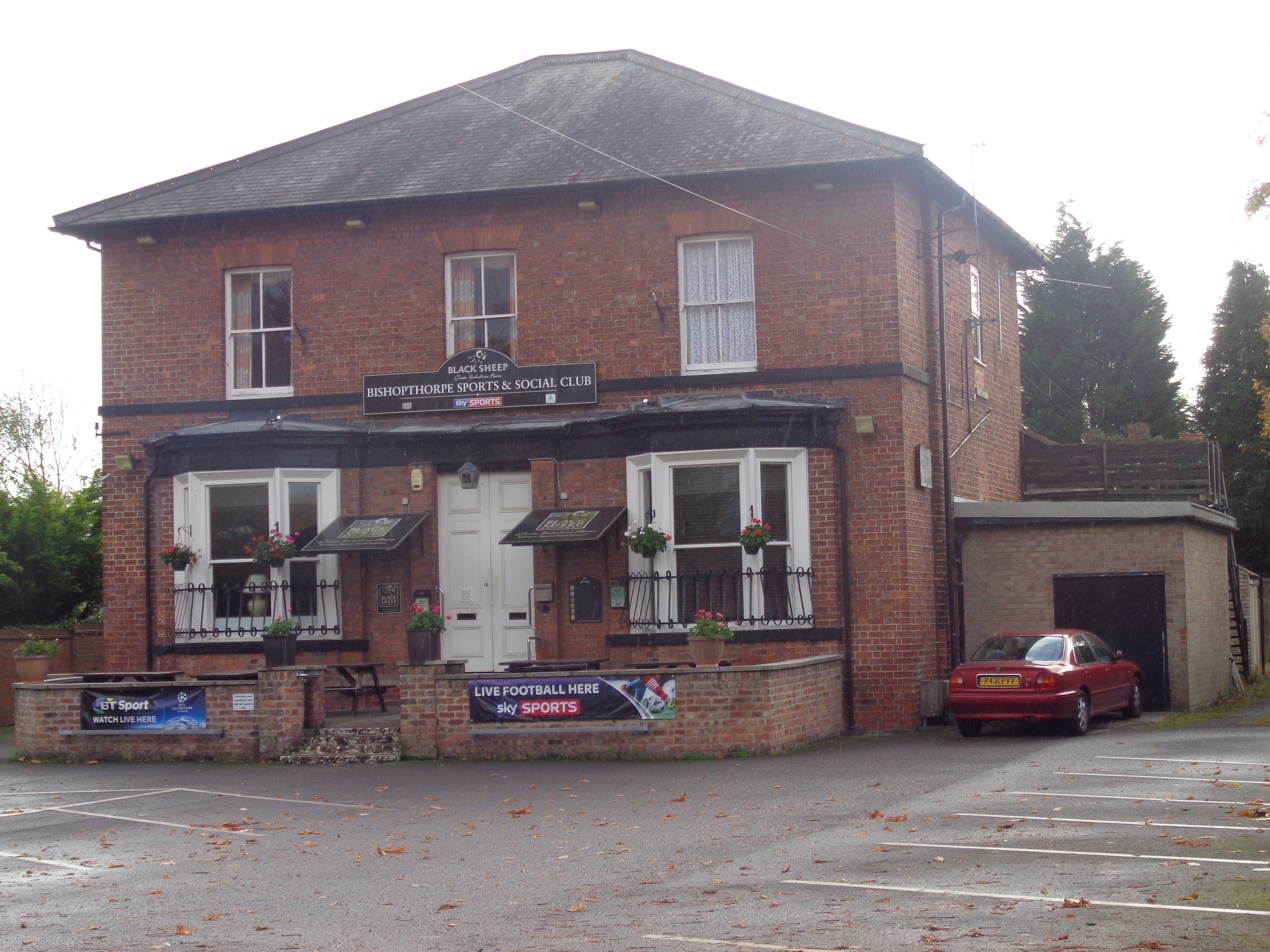
Bishopthorpe Sports and Social Club

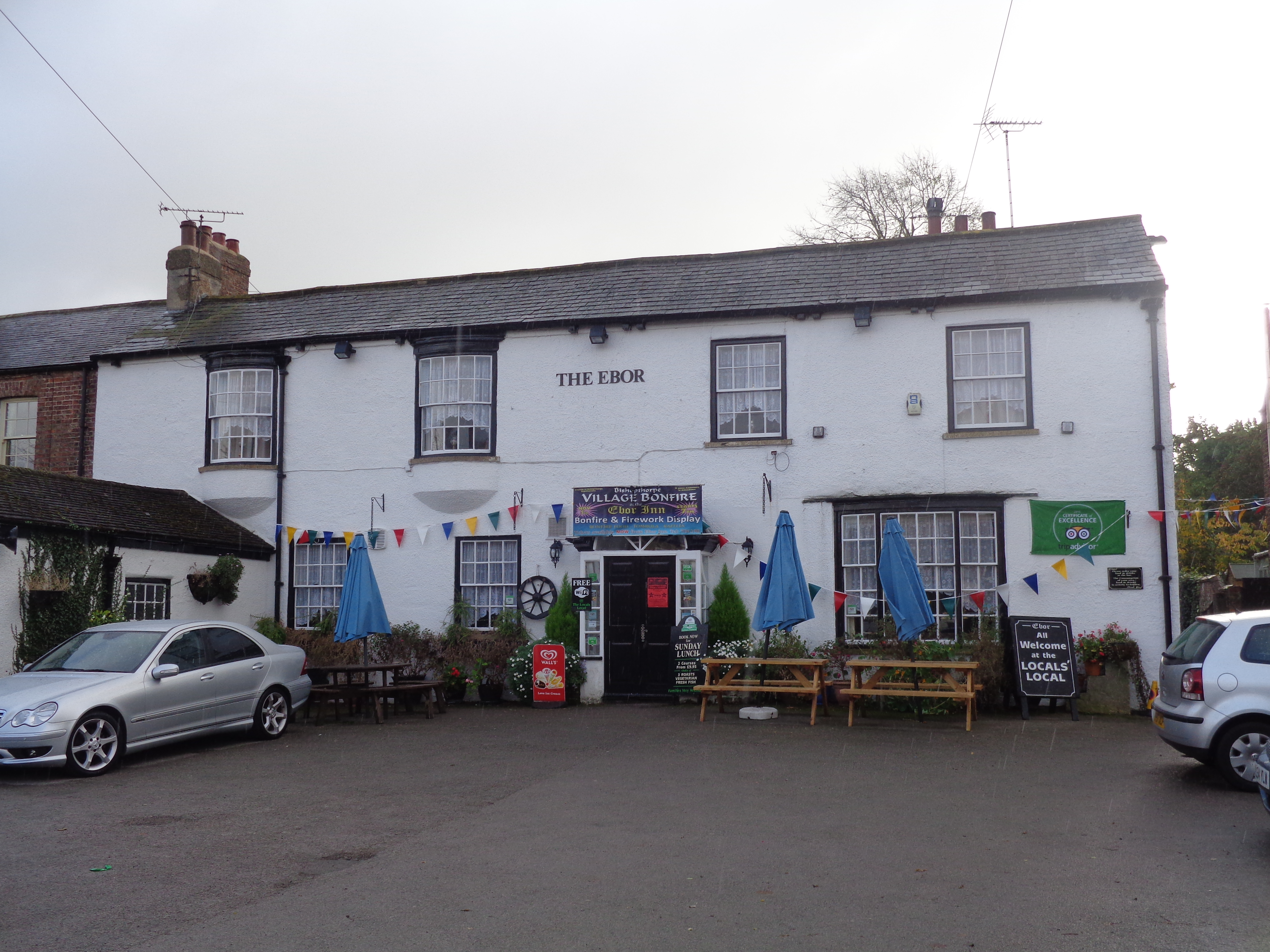
The Ebor

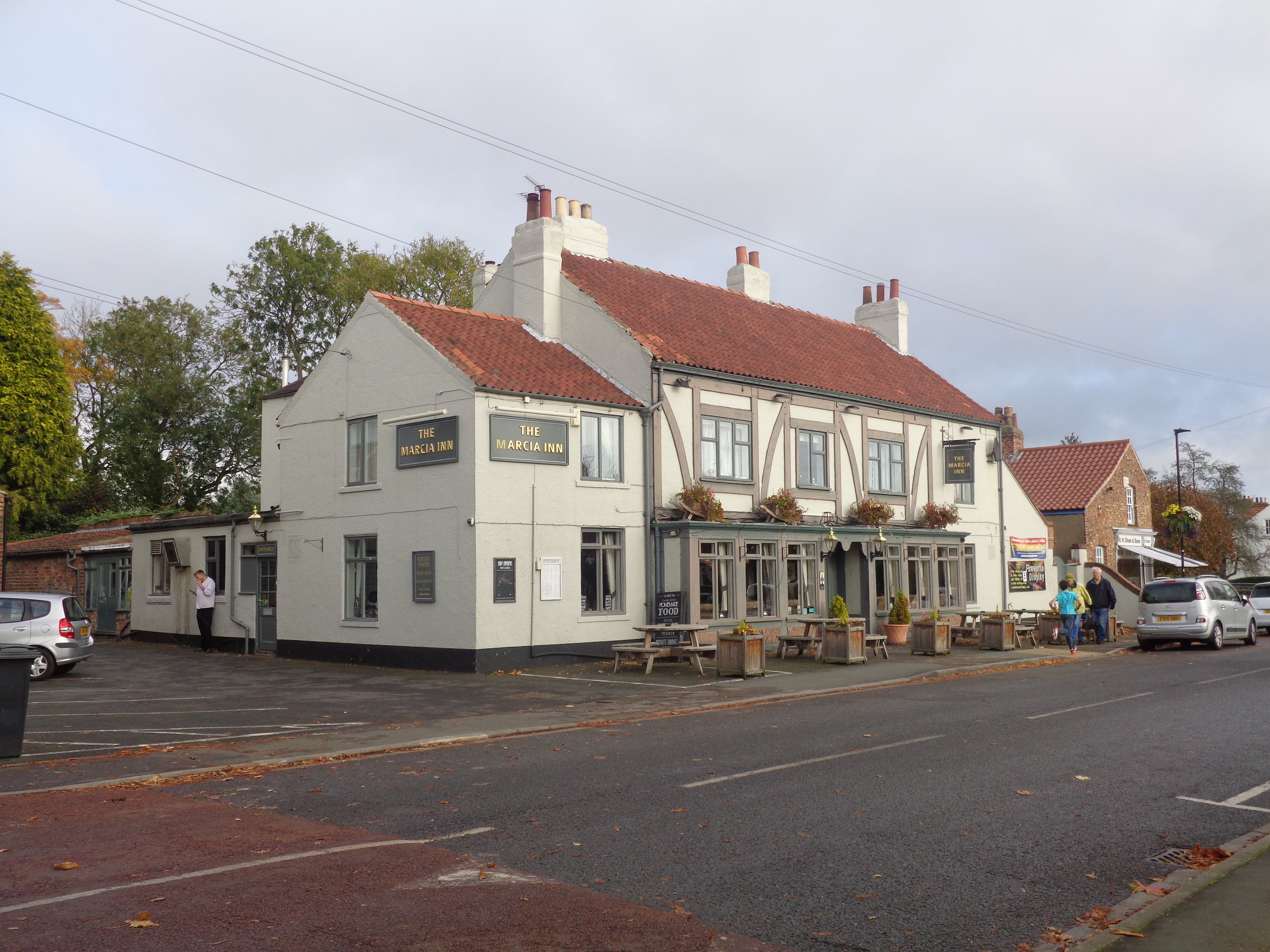
The Marcia

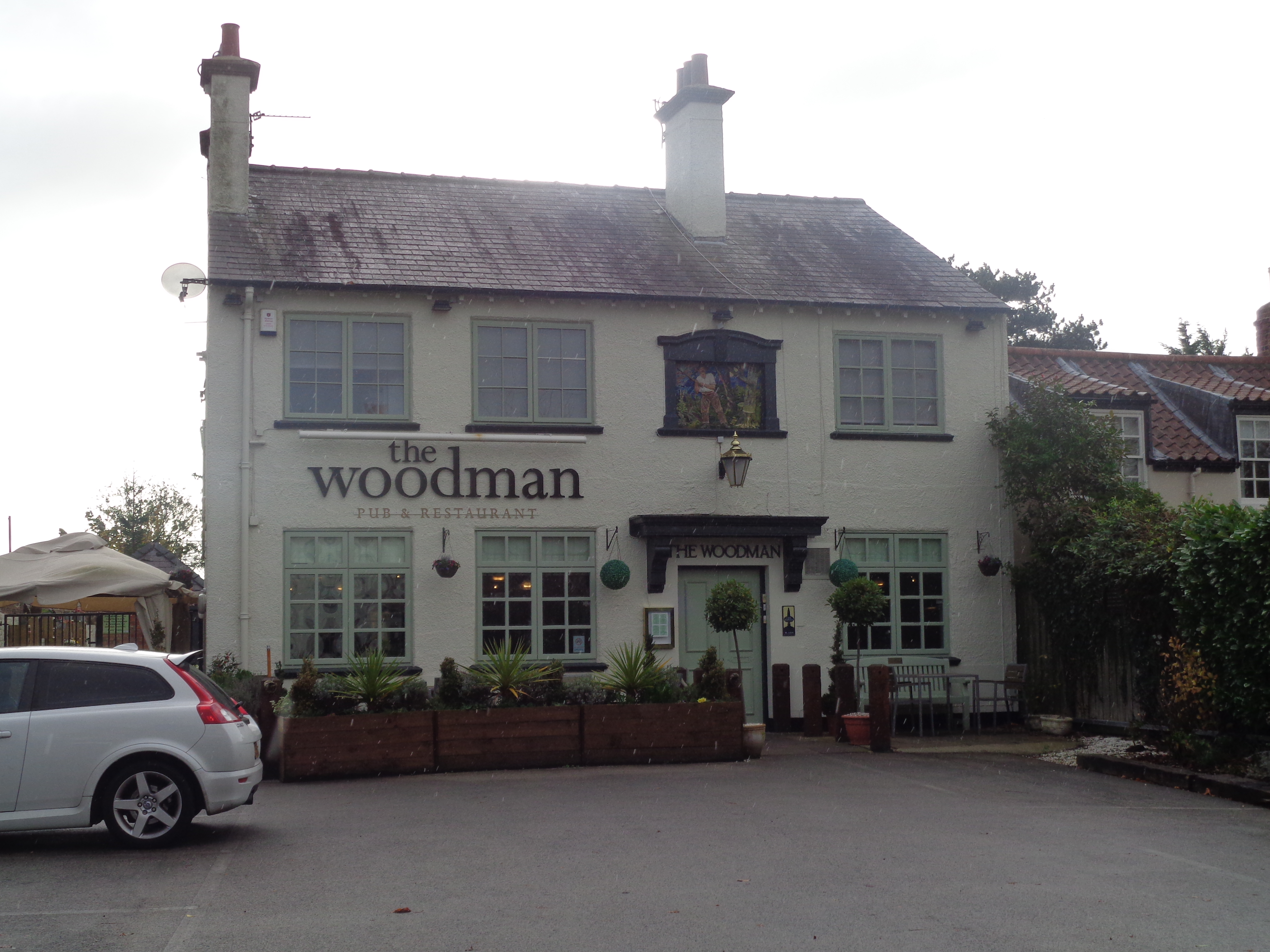
The Woodman

== Geography and transport ==
The village is close by the River Ouse, along which are "ings", fields into which the water overflows, most recently in June 2007. In March 1947, the entire length of Main Street was under flood water. The Water Tower in Acaster Lane was built by Archbishop Thomson in 1863.

The village is served by two bus services. One route, operated by Harrogate Coach Travel, runs along Tadcaster Road in York, before entering the village along Sim Balk Lane and the other is a direct route along Bishopthorpe Road into York run by First Group.

It is also on the Sustrans Solar System Cycle Track which runs from York to Riccall and is part of the National Cycle Network and Trans-Pennine Way. In 1986/7, the Selby/York Cycle Path opened on the old railway line which had ceased to have railway traffic from 1983 because of the Selby Diversion.

== Education and religion ==
The Archbishop of York's School dates back to 1763 and was built on the site of what is now 8, 10 and 12 School Lane.

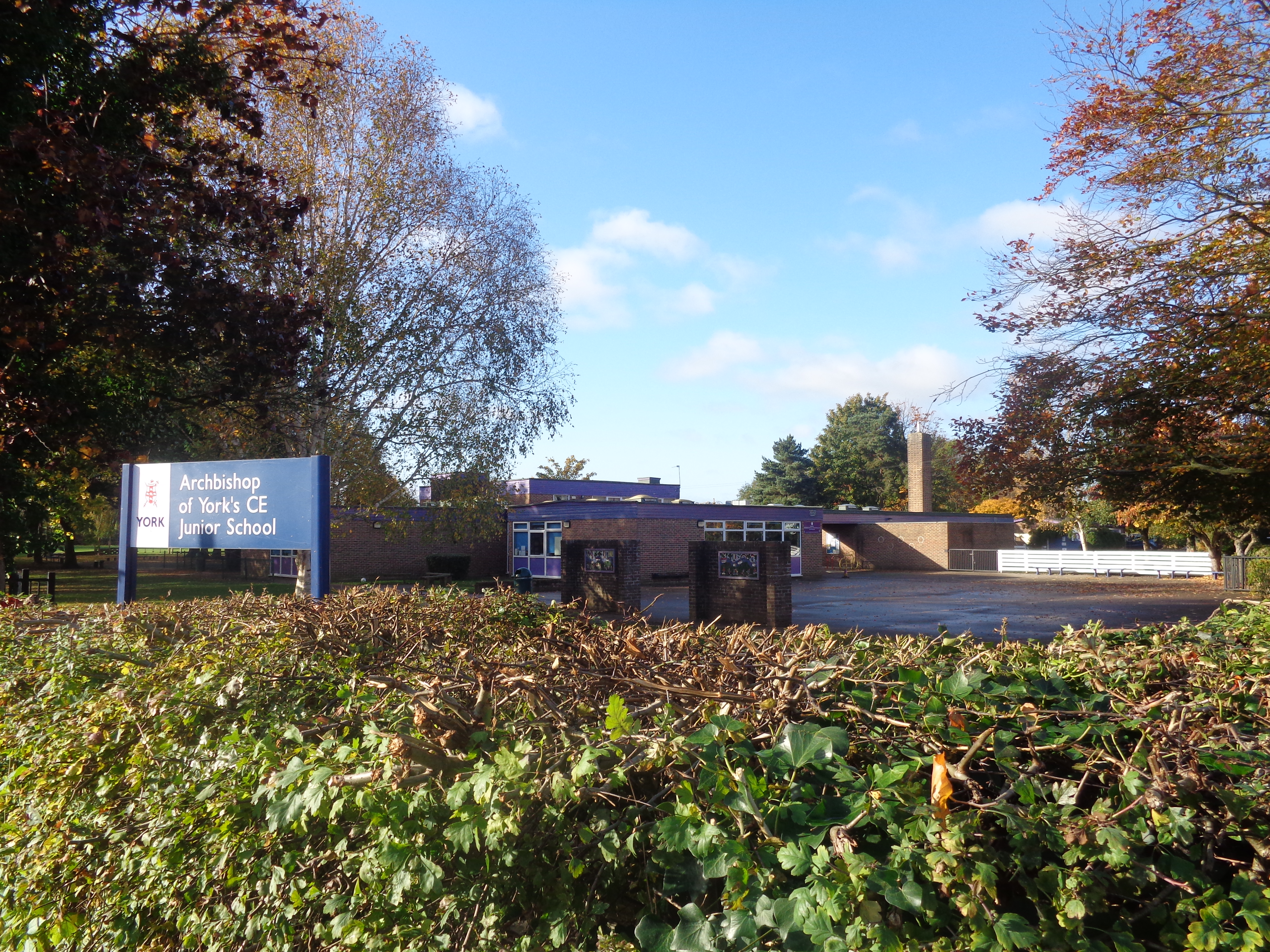
Archbishop of York's Junior School.

In 1846 The Archbishop of York's CE Primary School was opened, located on Acaster Road. The interior is depicted in a stained glass window in the parish church. Originally 2 classrooms, further classrooms were added in 1893 and 1932. The original school became a girls' school until it was converted into cottages in 1893. In 1967, Archbishop of York's CE Junior School opened across the Appleton Road on the site of the playing fields and serves the communities of Acaster Malbis, Middlethorpe as well the village itself.

In 1973, Bishopthorpe Infant's School opened on Sim Balk Lane.

Archbishop Drummond built Old St Andrew's Church on the site of the original (dating back to 1215) in 1768 but its foundations were gradually being washed away by the River Ouse. The St Andrew's Church was constructed between 1898 and 1899 on Back Lane (now known as Church Lane), located away from the River Ouse. The tower was added in 1903. The architect was C. Hodgson Fowler.

The current Bishopthorpe Methodist Church opened in 1899. The first Methodist Chapel built in 1833 is now private accommodation, Wesley House, situated behind the Supermarket.

== Sports ==
- Bishopthorpe Bowling Club was formed in 1927 and is located on Acaster Lane. The Club have six teams playing in four different league competitions in the York area.
- Bishopthorpe Cricket Club located in Ferry Lane have been in existence for over 100 years and play in the York Vale League. The 1st XI play in Division One and the 2nd XI in Division Three.
- Bishopthorpe United Football Club play in Division One of the York Football League with the reserves playing in the Reserve Division A at their ground on Ferry Lane.
- Bishopthorpe Club Football Club play in Division One of the York Sunday Morning League. Formed in 2008 as Dynamo Megahorse, through a successful period as Marcia Bishopthorpe to where they stand now.
- Bishopthorpe White Rose JFC provide football to boys and girls playing throughout the York leagues from U7s to U16s. The club's home colours are purple and black.

== Transport ==
Bus services are provided by First York, Transdev York and Connexionsbuses.

In the early eighteenth century, Lord Wenlock who also owned land at Naburn and Acaster Malbis built a ferry to enable him to visit his estates. It remained in use until 1955. Another passenger ferry provided a regular service between Bishopthorpe and King's Staith in York until the mid-1960s.

== Landmarks and notable people ==
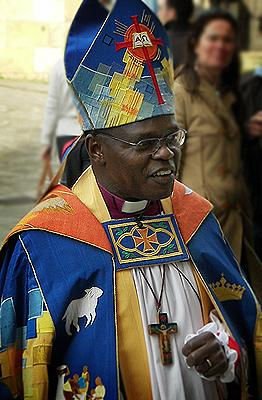
John Sentamu, Archbishop of York, 2005–2020

Bishopthorpe Palace is a Grade I listed building and is the residence of the Archbishop of York. North of the village is Middlethorpe Hall, a Grade I listed building since 2008 owned by The National Trust and now used as a country house hotel.

Bishopthorpe has a long history of notable ecclesiastical residents. The latest Archbishop of York is Stephen Cottrell, who has been resident since July 2020 when he succeeded John Sentamu. Many of the streets in Bishopthorpe are named after previous Archbishops: for example, Ramsey Avenue (Michael Ramsey, 1956–1961), Maclagan Road (William Maclagan, 1891–1908), Lamplugh Crescent (Thomas Lamplugh, 1688–1691), Coggan Way (Donald Coggan, 1961–1974), Garbett Way (Cyril Garbett, 1942–1955), Temple Road (William Temple, 1929–1942), Lang Road (Cosmo Gordon Lang, 1909 – 1928), Vernon Close (Edward Venables-Vernon, 1808–1847, Drummond Way (Robert Hay Drummond, 1761–1776), Wolsley Drive (Thomas Wolsey, 1514–1530) and De Grey Place (Walter de Gray, 1216–1255).

== See also ==
- Listed buildings in Bishopthorpe
