= Brandsby-cum-Stearsby =

Civil parish in North Yorkshire, England

Coordinates: 54.139°N 1.077°W

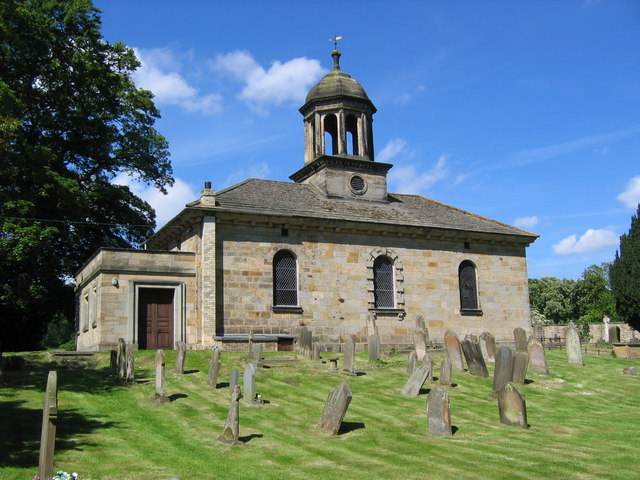
All Saints' Church, Brandsby, 2006

Brandsby-cum-Stearsby is a civil parish in the county of North Yorkshire, England, with a population of 234 (2001 census), increasing to 383 at the 2011 Census and including Dalby-cum-Skewsby and Yearsley. It includes the villages of Brandsby (which has a separate article) and Stearsby.

From 1974 to 2023 it was part of the Hambleton District, it is now administered by the unitary North Yorkshire Council.

There are five scheduled ancient monuments in the parish, all round barrows:

- Round barrow 300m south of Barhouse Farm at grid reference SE587719
- Round barrow 450m north-east of Hagg Farm grid reference SE62347199
- Round barrow 300m east of Warren House grid reference SE60507316
- Round barrow 150m south of Warren House grid reference SE60187303
- Round barrow 300m west of Quarry House grid reference SE60587285

== See also ==
- Listed buildings in Brandsby-cum-Stearsby
