= Thomas Atkinson (architect) =

English architect

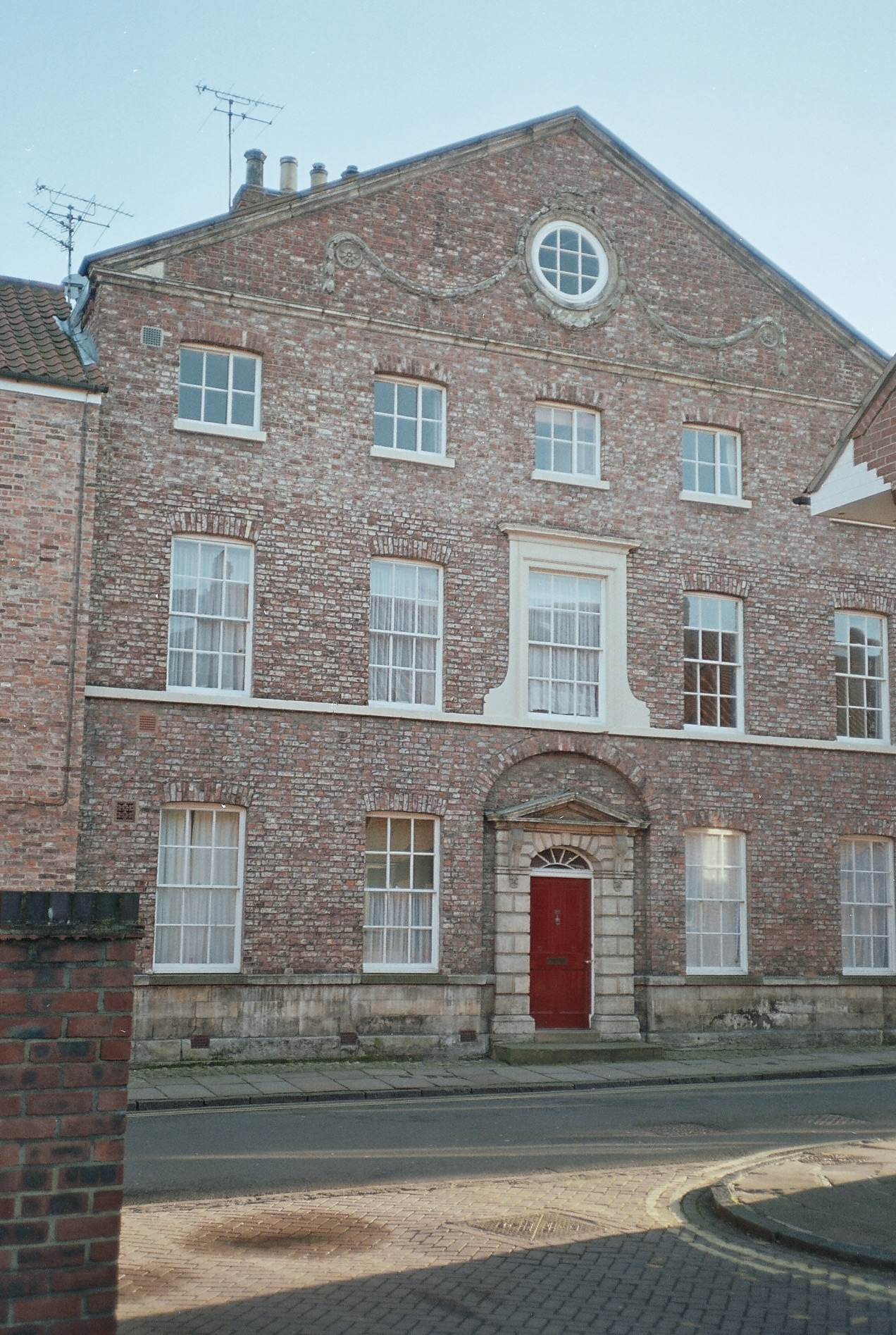
20, St Andrewgate, York – the house that Atkinson built for himself

Thomas Atkinson (1729–1798) was an English architect, best remembered for remodelling Bishopthorpe Palace in the Gothic Revival style.

== Life ==
Atkinson was born at York, the son of Thomas and Jane Marshall Atkinson. His father was a mason. He worked with his father and later developed an architectural practice based in York. The house that he built there for himself in about 1780 still stands at 20 St Andrewgate in the city centre. He was the leading Yorkshire-based architect of the second half of the 18th century.

Atkinson converted to Roman Catholicism; he received a number of commissions from the Yorkshire Catholic gentry. He was commissioned to design a new chapel for Bar Convent. The dome was concealed beneath a slate roof, so that it was hidden from view. Atkinson also built eight different escape routes into the Chapel, to ensure that if the building was stormed, the worshippers would be able to escape. In 1776, he produced designs for a planned development of the city of Sheffield which never came to pass.

== Selected buildings ==
- Bishopthorpe Palace, York - remodelled the facade and the gatehouse in the 1760s.
- Sutton Park, North Yorkshire – Atkinson is believed to have designed the house, which was completed in 1764.
- Old St Andrew's Church, Bishopthorpe, 1768
- Bar Convent, York – built the chapel (1765–9) and the main front (1787–9), also other alterations between 1778 and 1793.
- Carlton Towers, Selby – added long East Wing in 1765.
- Houghton Hall, Sancton, North Yorkshire – built country house 1765-8 for Philip Langdale.
- All Saints' Church, Brandsby, 1767–1770
- Dalton Hall (Beverley) – built in 1771-6 for Sir Charles Hotham, 8th Baronet
- Terregles House, Kirkcudbrightshire, Scotland – built 1788 for W H Maxwell Constable.
- Most Holy Sacrament Church, Marton, East Riding of Yorkshire - completed 1789

== Sources ==
- Colvin, H. M. (1954). Biographical Dictionary of English Architects 1660–1840. London: John Murray.
- Pevsner, Nikolaus; Neave, David (1995) [1972]. Yorkshire: York and the East Riding (2nd ed.). London: Penguin Books. ISBN 0-14-071061-2.
