= Cecil Allenby =

English cricketer and British Royal Navy officer (1873–1932)

Captain Cecil Allenby
Personal information
- Full name: Marmaduke Cecil Allenby
- Born: 30 August 1873; Elvington, Yorkshire, England
- Died: 16 April 1932 (aged 58); Mannamead, Devon, England

Domestic team information
- Years: Team
- 1900: Hampshire

Career statistics
Competition	First-class
Matches	1
Runs scored	0
Batting average	0.00
100s/50s	0/0
Top score	0
Catches/stumpings	0/–
- Source: Cricinfo, 5 August 2008

Marmaduke Cecil Allenby (30 August 1873 – 16 April 1932) was an English first-class cricketer and an officer in the Royal Navy.

The son of Robert Allenby, he was born in August 1873 at Elvington Hall in the Yorkshire village of Elvington. He attended the Britannia Royal Naval College in 1886, graduating from there into the Royal Navy as a sub-lieutenant in June 1893. Promotion to lieutenant followed in October 1895. Allenby made a single appearance in first-class cricket for Hampshire against Sussex at Portsmouth in the 1900 County Championship. He was dismissed once in the match without scoring by Fred Tate in Hampshire's first innings, but was not required to bat in their second innings. He also played minor counties cricket for Devon, making two appearances against Monmouthshire and Glamorgan in 1902, and a third against Cornwall in 1911.

While serving as a lieutenant, he was on 15 September 1902 posted to the protected cruiser HMS Argonaut, serving on the China Station. Allenby retired from the navy at his own request in June 1912, and the following year he was allowed to assume the rank of commander on the retired list. He returned to active service during the First World War, where he was appointed a superintendent with the Chart and Chronometer Depot at Sheerness Dockyard. He was promoted to captain on the final day of the war, in recognition of his service during the conflict. Allenby died at Mannamead in Plymouth on 16 April 1932.
