= Church of St Michael and All Angels, Sutton upon Derwent =

Anglican church in Yorkshire, England

Church of St Michael and All Angels
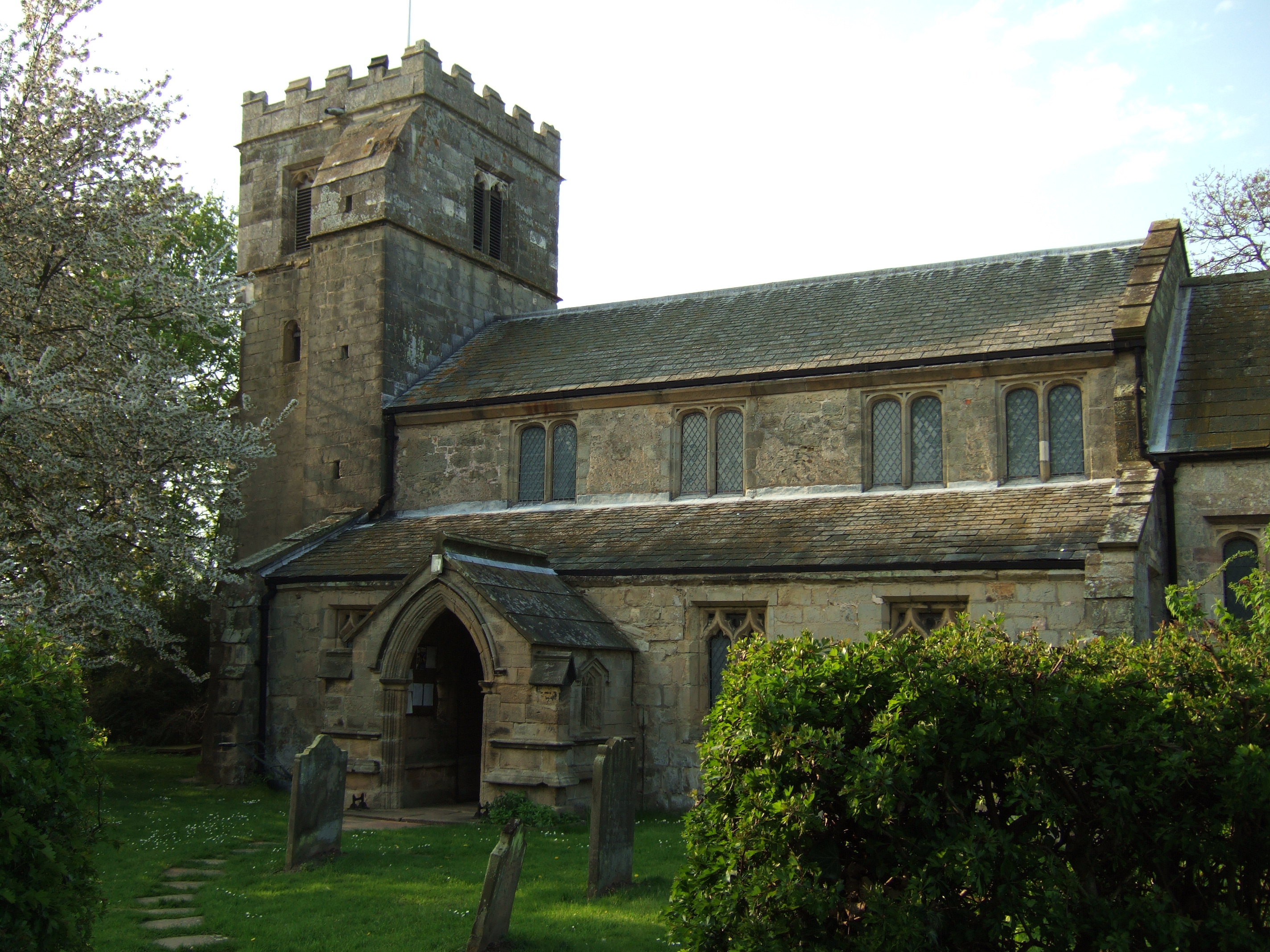
- Church of St Michael and All Angels
- 53.9171°N 0.9267°W
- OS grid reference: SE705473
- Location: Sutton upon Derwent, East Riding of Yorkshire
- Country: England
- Denomination: Anglican
- Website: www.achurchnearyou.com/church/18915/

History
- Status: Parish church
- Dedication: St Michael and All Angels

Architecture
- Functional status: Active

Administration
- Diocese: York
- Archdeaconry: York
- Deanery: Derwent
- Benefice: Derwent Ings
- Parish: Sutton on Derwent with East Cottingwith

Listed Building – Grade I
- Designated: 26 January 1967
- Reference no.: 1162085

The Church of St Michael and All Angels is an Anglican church in the village of Sutton upon Derwent in the East Riding of Yorkshire, England. The oldest parts of the church date back to the 12th century and the church is now a grade I listed building.

== History ==
The Church of St Michael and All Angels lies at the northern end of Sutton upon Derwent on Main Street and on the edge of the River Derwent flood plain. Neither a priest or a church are mentioned in the village's Domesday entry, but a record exists showing that between 1161 and 1170, Robert de Percy gifted the church and its advowson to Whitby Abbey and it is thought this relates to the stone church although a wooden church has been theorised to pre-date this. A disagreement ensued in 1233 between the widow of Robert de Percy and the abbot of Whitby Abbey regarding the rights of advowson which continued for such a length of time, the right lapsed and was returned to the Archbishop of York. A cross shaft was unearthed at the church which dates back to the 11th century, the earliest physical heritage found in the village. The cross shaft is thought to be Anglo-Danish in origin and predates the Battle of Stamford Bridge in 1066 (some 6 miles (9.7 km) to the north) by decades.

The original church was in a simple cruciform shape with a central tower above the north and south transepts. The current church consists of a chancel which has a north-facing vestry, an organ chamber, a nave with a south-facing porch and a tower on the west side. The vestry was not added until the renovations of 1926–1928. The chancel dates back to the 12th century with 13th century additions, and the western tower was added sometime in the 14th century after the previous Norman-style central tower had collapsed; a common occurrence with Norman towers. The tower was rebuilt in the 15th century and the nave was re-roofed in the 16th century when the clerestory was added, and the glass was replaced around the same time. In a chamber under the tower arch in the church is a "battered" drawing of Saint George and the Dragon with the maiden Cleodolinda (Note: In many tales of St George and the Dragon, Cleodolinda is the name of the princess who St George rescues from being eaten by a dragon.) looking on, which has been dated to c. 1340. The walls of the chancel were raised by 2 feet (0.61 m) in the 17th century, and the east window was reduced in width from 12 feet 8 inches (3.86 m) to 9 feet 9 inches (2.97 m).

The layout of the church at Sutton upon Derwent in the late 1920s after renovation

A survey undertaken in 1851 detailed that Sutton upon Derwent had a population of 325 whilst the church had 190 sittings; of which 142 were free, and 48 were private. Renovations undertaken in 1927 led to the discovery of a skeleton underneath the south aisle which had been interred with a chalice and platen (plate). According to the constitution of Henry of Blois (1130), these items were for the use of the Church; "two chalices, one of silver for use at the mass, the other of pewter, not consecrated, to be buried with the priest." Records indicate that this was most likely Robert de Gloucester who was instituted in 1234 and was succeeded in 1299. (Note: The period of time (65 years) could possibly be erroneous.) Besides renovations in the 1920s, the church had work done in 1841 and 1846. During the renovations between 1926 and 1928 by Penty & Thompson of York, the gallery was removed, and the font was moved from the south aisle to the centre aisle near to the tower arch.

A memorial to the 4th Viscount St Vincent (Edward John Leveson Jervis) who was killed at the battle of Abu Klea in Sudan 1885, exists in the church.

In the churchyard there is a war memorial with eight names appended onto it from the First World War and two from the Second World War, with one Commonwealth War Grave. (Note: The IWM reference states that there are 16 names from WWI, and four from WW2.) Although the churchyard was closed by a burial order dated 7 October 1899, it was enlarged in 1922, and the church was grade I listed in 1967.

== Parish and Benefice ==
The name of the parish is Sutton on Derwent with East Cottingwith and it is within the benefice of Derwent Ings, the Deanery of Derwent, and the Archdeaconry and Diocese of York. Historically it was in the Deanery of Harthill.

== See also ==
- Grade I listed churches in the East Riding of Yorkshire
- Listed buildings in Sutton upon Derwent
