= Rolawn =

English landscaping supplier

Rolawn Limited
- Type: Limited Company
- Industry: Landscaping
- Founded: 1975
- Headquarters: Seaton Ross
- Products: Turf, Topsoil
- Number of employees: 100
- Website: https://www.rolawn.co.uk

Rolawn Limited is a turf grower and landscaping supplier based in the East Riding of Yorkshire.

Rolawn has developed technology to extend the shelf life of turf.

In 2017, Rolawn commissioned independent research by the STRI Group into the rooting capabilities of thinner cut younger turf, which found that it showed deeper, denser more vigorous rooting than when cut older and thicker.

== History ==
In 1975, Rolawn was founded in Scotland before moving south to Elvington near York. In 2017, Rolawn's Head Office moved to Seaton Ross.

Nigel Forbes was a politician, soldier and chairman of Rolawn from 1975 to 1998.

In 2008, Rolawn was involved in litigation with Turfmech which it accused of infringing Rolawn's intellectual property in the design of a mower. The matter was settled out of court. Turfmech agreed not to pursue the 'wide mower' market.
