= Listed buildings in Elvington, North Yorkshire =

Elvington is a civil parish in the unitary authority of the City of York, North Yorkshire, England. It contains twelve listed buildings that are recorded in the National Heritage List for England. Of these, one is listed at Grade II*, the middle of the three grades, and the others are at Grade II, the lowest grade. The parish contains the village of Elvington and the surrounding countryside. Most of the listed buildings are houses and associated structures, and the others include a wind pump, a church, a telephone kiosk, and a control tower.

== Key ==
Grade	Criteria
II*	Particularly important buildings of more than special interest
II	Buildings of national importance and special interest

== Buildings ==
Name and location	Photograph	Date	Notes	Grade
Elvington Hall; 53.91980°N 0.93128°W	—	16th century	The house, which has been altered and extended, is in reddish-orange and pinkish-brown brick, with dressings in red brick and stone, and a Welsh slate roof. The garden front has two storeys and three bays, a later two storey two-bay addition on the right, and a further two-storey three-bay service wing. The entrance has a doorcase with pilasters, a frieze, a dentilled cornice, and an open dentilled pediment, and a doorway with a radial fanlight. This is flanked by full-height canted bay windows, and the other windows are sashes under red gauged brick with continuous sill bands. The main entrance at the rear has a Corinthian doorcase with a dentilled frieze and a pediment.	II*
The Grange; 53.91642°N 0.93833°W	—	18th century	The house is stuccoed, and has a Welsh slate roof with stone copings and kneelers. There are two storeys and three bays, and an added bay to the right. The doorway has paired Doric pilasters, a frieze and a cornice, it is flanked by ornate cast iron boot scrapers, and the windows are sashes. In front of the house is a cast iron verandah with a trellis-work arcade. On the garden front is a canted bay window.	II
Wind pump 53.91381°N 0.96116°W		Mid-18th century (probable)	The wind pump to a former brickworks is in pinkish-orange brick with stone coping. It has a circular plan, tapering to the neck and then widening out again. The pump is about 5 metres (16 ft) in height, and contains small openings.	II
Belvoir House; 53.92037°N 0.93621°W		Mid to late 18th century	A farmhouse and an attached barn later incorporated into the house, they are in pinkish-orange brick, with a floor band, a dentilled eaves cornice, and a pantile roof. There are two storeys, the house has three bays, the barn to the right has two bays, and to the left is an extension. Steps in the centre of the house lead to a doorway with a divided fanlight, and the windows are sashes.	II
Carthouse and stables, The Grange; 53.91705°N 0.93893°W	—	Mid to late 18th century	The buildings are in pinkish-orange brick, with dressings in red rubbed brick, a modillion eaves band and a pantile roof. There are two storeys and three bays, the middle bay projecting slightly under a hipped roof, flanked by single bay wings, and three added bays on the left. There is a central entrance, the remains of casement and horizontally sliding sash windows, and in the addition is a carriage entrance with an elliptical arch.	II
Brook House; 53.92002°N 0.93321°W	—	Early 19th century	The house is in pinkish-brown brick, with stone dressings, a modillion eaves band, and a Welsh slate roof with stone kneelers to the gables. There are two storeys, an L-shaped plan with later infill, and a front of three bays. The central doorway has attached Tuscan columns, a fanlight, a frieze and a hood. Flanking it are canted bay windows, and the upper floor windows are sashes with wedge lintels.	II
Roxby Farmhouse; 53.92072°N 0.93581°W	—	Early 19th century	The house is in pinkish-brown brick with a hipped Welsh slate roof. There are two storeys and three bays, and a rear range. The central doorway has pilasters, a fanlight, a frieze and a hood. The windows are sashes with stone sills and wedge lintels.	II
The Cottage; 53.91918°N 0.93445°W	—	Early 19th century	The house is in rendered and whitewashed brick with a roof of tile and Welsh slate. There are two storeys and three bays, and a rear range. The central doorway has fluted pilasters, a fanlight, a frieze and a hood, and the windows are sashes.	II
The Old Rectory; 53.91877°N 0.93497°W	—	Early 19th century	The rectory, later a private house, is in rendered and whitewashed brick with a hipped tile roof. There are two storeys and attics, and three bays. In the centre is a porch and a doorway with fluted pilasters, capitals with garlands, a fanlight and an open pediment. The ground floor windows are tripartite, on the upper floor are sash windows, all with stone sills, and there are roof dormers.	II
Holy Trinity Church; 53.91864°N 0.93391°W		1877	The church, designed by William White, is in sandstone with a Welsh slate roof. It consists of a nave, a north aisle, a chancel with a five-sided apse, a north vestry, and an almost detached northwest tower. The tower has three stepped stages, a plinth, quoins, a north pointed doorway with a hood mould, lancet windows, and bands. On the top is a shingled belfry with a tent roof.	II
Telephone kiosk 53.92032°N 0.93517°W	—	1935	The telephone kiosk in Main Street is of the K6 type designed by Giles Gilbert Scott. Constructed in cast iron with a square plan and a dome, it has three unperforated crowns in the top panels.	II
Control Tower, Yorkshire Air Museum; 53.92592°N 0.96643°W		1942	The control tower in former RAF Elvington, later a museum, was a Watch Office for Night Fighter Stations. The building has two storeys and a rectangular plan. It is in rendered and painted brick, with very thick walls, pre-cast hollow beam reinforced concrete floors and roof, galvanized-steel Crittall windows, and a reinforced concrete observation gallery. The gallery is carried on four cantilevered L-beam girders, and has a tubular galvanised steel handrail.	II
