= Sutton Bridge, Yorkshire =

Listed bridge in Yorkshire, England

Sutton Bridge
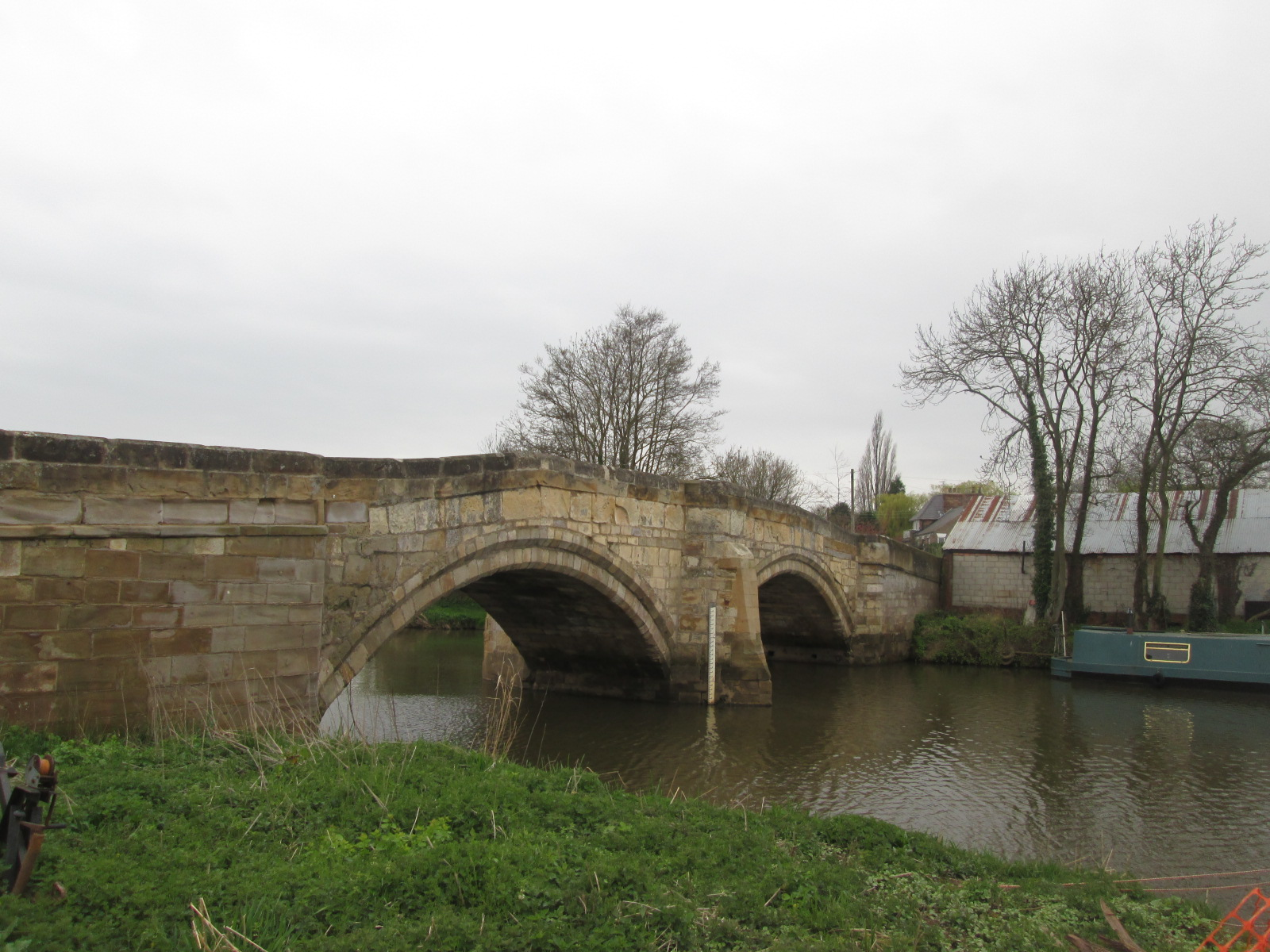
- The bridge in 2014

- Location in the East Riding of Yorkshire
- 53.921°N 0.928°W
- Location: Sutton-upon-Derwent, East Riding of Yorkshire, England

Listed Building – Grade II*
- Official name: Sutton Bridge
- Designated: 25 October 1951
- Reference no.: 1148519

Sutton Bridge is a historic bridge in Yorkshire, in England.

The bridge crosses the River Derwent, linking Elvington in the City of York with Sutton-upon-Derwent in the East Riding of Yorkshire. It forms part of the B1228 road. A bridge at the location was first recorded in 1396, and it may have replaced an earlier ferry.

The current bridge probably dates from the late 17th century. It is built of Magnesian Limestone, and has two arches. The central pier has pointed cutwaters. The parapet is built of three courses of stone, and there are pedestrian refuges on either side at the mid-point of the bridge. As implied, there is no proper pedestrian path on the bridge but the traffic lights do allow for a 5–10 second gap.

The bridge was Grade II* listed in 1986. In 2010, it was badly damaged by a lorry, which was never traced. It closed for a month for repairs, during which it was strengthened, and the width between the parapets was increased. In 2013, a ban on heavy goods vehicles using the bridge was considered in order to make it safer for pedestrians, but the plan was rejected, while various proposed safety measures were also rejected as unenforceable or unlikely to prove effective.

== See also ==
- Grade II* listed buildings in the City of York
- Listed buildings in Sutton upon Derwent
