= Elvington Hall =

Listed building in York, England

General information
- Status: Private residence (probable)
- Type: Manor house
- Location: B1228, Elvington, North Yorkshire, England
- Coordinates: 53.9198°N 0.9312°W
- Year built: Late 16th or early 17th century
- Renovated: Mid to late 18th and early 19th century (altered and added) c. 1920 (wing added)

Design and construction
- Architects: John Carr (18th century; possible)

Listed Building – Grade II*
- Official name: Elvington Hall
- Designated: 14 March 1986
- Reference no.: 1316297

Elvington Hall is a Grade II* listed building on the B1228 in Elvington, a village in the City of York, approximately 7 miles (11 km) south-east of York, England. It contains elements from the Elizabethan period, with later additions made in the 18th, 19th and 20th centuries. Members of the Sterne family owned the hall in the late 17th and early 18th century, when Laurence Sterne's grandmother inherited the property, and it served briefly as the author's childhood home. The house remained the manor house until 1881 and passed through several owners during the 20th century. It was included in the Elvington conservation area in 1990. No reliable published source has been identified that records the building's use after the late 20th century.

== History ==
Elvington Hall contains fabric from the late 16th or early 17th century, and the north front is thought to be the oldest surviving part of the building. Further changes were made over the following centuries: a drawing room and staircase were added on the south‑west side in the late 18th century, possibly by designs associated with John Carr, and the south front was made symmetrical in the early 19th century with the addition of another room. The house was altered and extended again during the 20th century.

The hall was owned by members of the Sterne family in the late 17th and early 18th century, when Laurence Sterne's grandmother inherited the property. It served briefly as the childhood home of the future author.

By the later 18th century the property was still in the hands of the Sterne family. The journalist and war correspondent Charles Norris-Newman was born at the hall in 1852, and the first‑class cricketer and Royal Navy officer Cecil Allenby was born there in 1873. It remained the manor house until 1881, when it was sold by John Dobby to Harriet Whitaker. After the death of her daughter Harriet Von Beverhoudt in 1934, the hall passed to their cousin Judith Bury‑Barry, who owned it until 1947. Her executors sold it to K. Wadham in 1957, and it changed ownership again in 1962 when it was bought by R. M. Pontefract, the owner in 1972.

On 14 March 1986, Elvington Hall was designated a Grade II* listed building, and in 1990 the site was included within the newly designated Elvington conservation area. No reliable published source has been identified that records the use of Elvington Hall after the late 20th century. Travel‑review websites carried comments in the early 2010s describing the property as offering bed‑and‑breakfast accommodation, but such sites are not considered reliable for establishing factual history. Anecdotal accounts indicate that the hall is now a private residence, although this has not been confirmed by any verifiable source.

== Architecture ==
=== Exterior ===
The building is constructed in reddish‑orange brick, with later areas in pinkish‑brown brick, and has a slate roof. The garden front, dating from the 18th century, has two storeys and three bays, with later 20th‑century additions to the right and a lower service wing beyond. The original entrance was in the centre, now a modern glazed door set within an older round‑arched recess. The outer bays are canted and rise the full height of the front. Most windows are 12‑pane sashes set under flat brick arches, with continuous sill bands and a dentil frieze below the roofline. The roof is hipped, with separate roofs over the canted bays, and cast‑iron rainwater heads. The 20th‑century additions, including a single bay and a canted bay, follow the general style of the earlier work. The service wing has tripartite and single 12‑pane sash windows, with chimneys at the ends and along the ridge. The rear entrance is a six‑panel double door set within a Corinthian‑style doorcase with a dentil frieze and pediment.

=== Interior ===
Inside, 18th‑century details survive in the cornices, friezes, fireplace surrounds, and window and door mouldings in the ground and first‑floor rooms of the left‑hand bay. The hall and lobby have a modillion cornice. The dining room contains a late‑18th or early‑19th‑century fireplace that was brought in from another building. The open‑well staircase, with two column‑and‑vase balusters to each tread, was installed around 1920. Six‑panel doors are used throughout.

== See also ==
- Grade II* listed buildings in the City of York
- Listed buildings in Elvington, North Yorkshire
