= Listed buildings in Sutton upon Derwent =

Sutton upon Derwent is a civil parish in the county of the East Riding of Yorkshire, England. It contains 13 listed buildings that are recorded in the National Heritage List for England. Of these, one is listed at Grade I, the highest of the three grades, one is at Grade II*, the middle grade, and the others are at Grade II, the lowest grade. The parish contains the village of Sutton upon Derwent and the surrounding countryside. Most of the listed buildings are houses, farmhouses and farm buildings, and the others consist of a church, a bridge, a public house and a rectory converted into a hotel.

== Key ==
Grade	Criteria
I	Buildings of exceptional interest, sometimes considered to be internationally important
II*	Particularly important buildings of more than special interest
II	Buildings of national importance and special interest

== Buildings ==
Name and location	Photograph	Date	Notes	Grade
St Michael's Church; 53.91711°N 0.92683°W		12th century	The church has been altered and extended through the centuries, including a restoration in 1926–28. It is built in stone with slate roofs, and consists of a nave with a clerestory, north and south aisles, a south porch, a chancel with a north chapel, and a west tower. The tower has three stages, a plinth, diagonal buttresses, a pointed west window, an external stair projection, a trefoil-headed light, two-light trefoil-headed bell openings, and an embattled parapet.	I
St Lois Farmhouse; 53.93386°N 0.92116°W	—	Late 16th to early 17th century (probable)	The farmhouse, which was remodelled and extended in the 18th century, is in red brick, with a floor band, a dentilled and stepped brick eaves cornice, and a hipped pantile roof. There are two storeys and four bays, and a later rear wing. On the front is a porch and doorway. The ground floor windows are 20th-century replacements, and on the upper floor are horizontally sliding sash windows.	II
Sutton Bridge; 53.92034°N 0.92829°W		Late 17th century (probable)	The bridge carries the B1228 road over the River Derwent. It is in magnesian limestone, and consists of two double-chamfered segmental arches with pointed cutwaters. The bridge has a three-course parapet with central refuges, and splayed ends.	II*
Cross Gates Farmhouse; 53.90591°N 0.92818°W	—	Late 17th to early 18th century	The house is in brown brick, with a floor band, a dentilled brick eaves cornice, and a pantile roof with raised gables on brick kneelers. There are two storeys and attics, and four bays. The doorway and the windows, which are casements, are under segmental brick arches.	II
Manor Farmhouse; 53.91663°N 0.92635°W	—	Late 17th to early 18th century	The house is in red brick, with a floor band, and a tile roof with raised coped gables. There are two storeys, and an L-shaped plan with later infilling, with a main front of three bays. In the centre is a porch and a doorway, and the windows are sashes under segmental brick arches.	II
Barn, Holly Tree Farm; 53.90613°N 0.92721°W		Mid-18th century	The barn is in brown brick, and has a pantile roof with raised gables. There are two storeys and three bays, the middle bay projecting. The barn contains doorways, windows and slit vents.	II
Saint Vincent Arms; 53.91586°N 0.92416°W		Mid-18th century	The public house is in rendered and colourwashed brick with applied timber framing, and a pantile roof with raised gables. There are two storeys and four bays, and a lower bay to the right. On the front are two doorways with fanlights, and three canted bay windows. The other windows are horizontally sliding sashes.	II
Orchard Cottage; 53.91197°N 0.92394°W	—	Late 18th century	The house is in brown brick, and has a pantile roof with raised gables. There are two storeys, two bays, and a continuous rear ourshut. The doorway is flanked by 20th-century windows under wedge lintels, and on the upper floor are horizontally sliding sash windows.	II
Sutton Grange; 53.92551°N 0.90606°W		Late 18th century	The house is in brown brick with a hipped pantile roof. There are two storeys and three bays. In the centre is a porch with a hipped roof, and the windows are sashes under wedge lintels.	II
Wheelwright Cottage; 53.91228°N 0.92449°W	—	Late 18th century	The house is in colourwashed brick, and has a pantile roof with plain close verges. There are two storeys and two bays, and the windows are sashes.	II
White House	—	Late 18th century	The house is in colourwashed brick, with a floor band, a brick dentilled eaves cornice, and a pantile roof with raised gables on kneelers. There are two storeys, two bays, and a rear wing, and the windows are sashes.	II
Sutton Hall; 53.89645°N 0.92967°W	—	1810	The house, which has an earlier rear wing, is in rendered brick, the rear wing is in red brick, and the roofs are tiled. The main block has two storeys and three bays, the middle bay projecting under a pediment with a raking cornice, and containing a blocked lunette. The windows are sashes under segmental arches. On the left return is a Tuscan porch and a doorway with a fanlight. The main block has a hipped roof, and the rear wing has a raised gable.	II
The Old Rectory Hotel; 53.91736°N 0.92354°W	—	1854	The rectory, later converted into a hotel, was designed by J. B. and W. Atkinson. It is in grey brick, partly stuccoed, with sill bands, and a hipped slate roof. There are two storeys and three bays, the middle bay projecting under a pediment on fluted brackets. It contains a doorway with a stuccoed surround, a fanlight and round-headed sidelights. The other windows are sashes under cambered brick arches. On the right return is a two-storey canted bay window under a hipped roof.	II
