= Sutton upon Derwent =

Village and civil parish in the East Riding of Yorkshire, England

Coordinates: 53.912975°N 0.923875°W

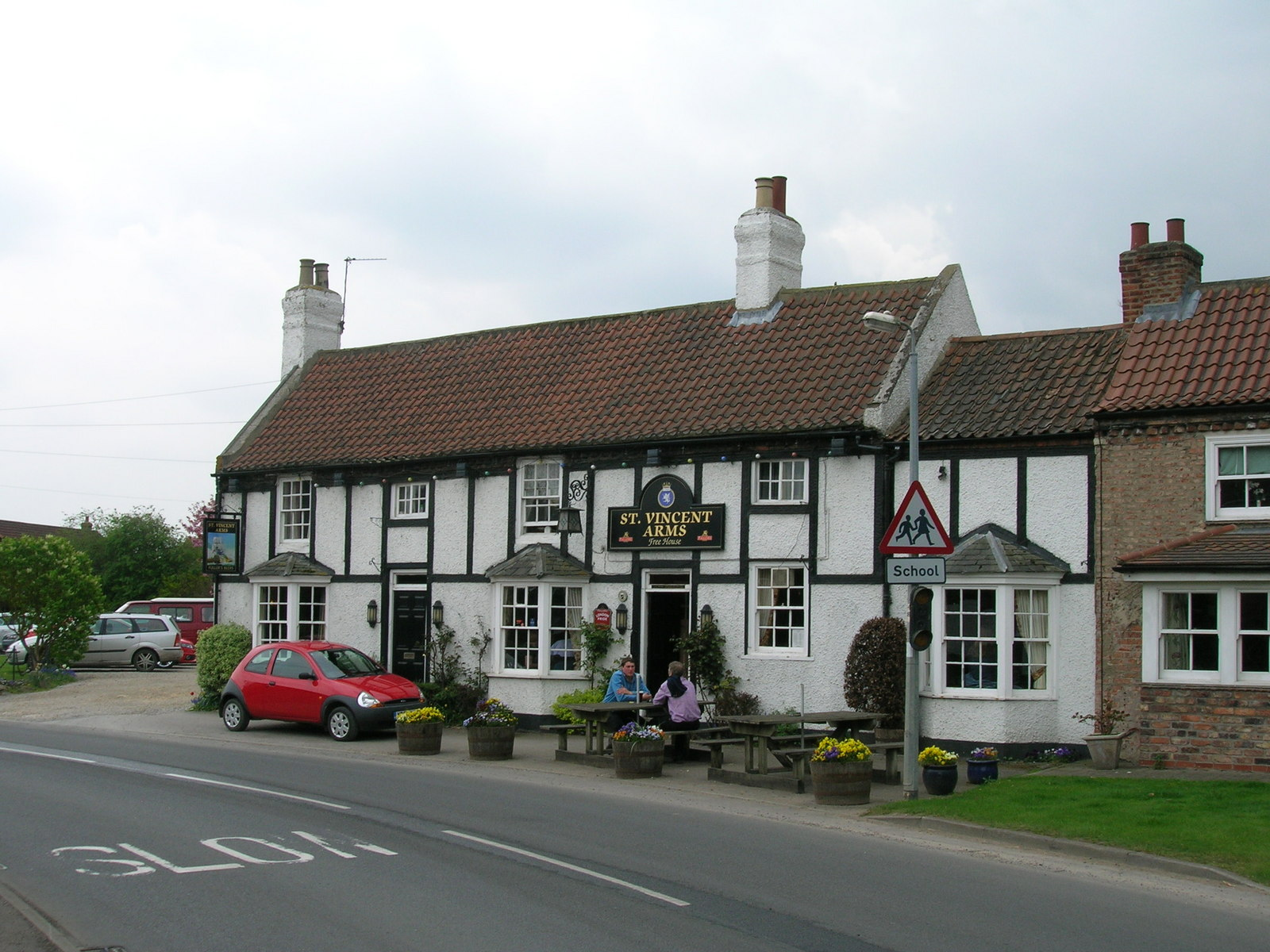
- The St Vincent Arms

- Location within the East Riding of Yorkshire
- Population: 594 (2011 census)
- OS grid reference: SE707468
- Civil parish: Sutton upon Derwent
- Unitary authority: East Riding of Yorkshire
- Ceremonial county: East Riding of Yorkshire
- Region: Yorkshire and the Humber
- Country: England
- Sovereign state: United Kingdom
- Post town: YORK
- Postcode district: YO41
- Dialling code: 01904
- Police: Humberside
- Fire: Humberside
- Ambulance: Yorkshire
- UK Parliament: Goole and Pocklington

Sutton upon Derwent is a small village and civil parish on the River Derwent in the East Riding of Yorkshire, England, approximately 8 miles (13 km) to the south-east of York, and less than a mile from the larger village of Elvington, which unlike Sutton, is included in the City of York boundary. Further down the B1228 is the village of Melbourne.

According to the 2011 UK census the population of the parish was 594, an increase on the 2001 UK census figure of 575, which itself represents an increase of around 50 per cent from 1991, largely due to new houses having been built in the village. Before this the population fluctuated from 274 in 1801 to 417 in 1831 and to 270 in 1931. Although Roman artefacts have been found in the Sutton upon Derwent area, suggesting a possible settlement, no conclusive evidence exists. The first likely reference to the existence of a settlement was recorded by Bede in the 8th century. The village was later mentioned in the 11th century Domesday Book.

The name Sutton derives from the Old English sūðtūn meaning 'south settlement'.

The village reflects a close association with the Jervis family, holders of the title of Viscount St Vincent since 1735, due to the Manor passing into the hands of Carnegie Robert John Jervis, 3rd Viscount St Vincent in 1857. The family held the Manor until it was sold to the Crown in 1947 and 1948. Manifestations of this association include:

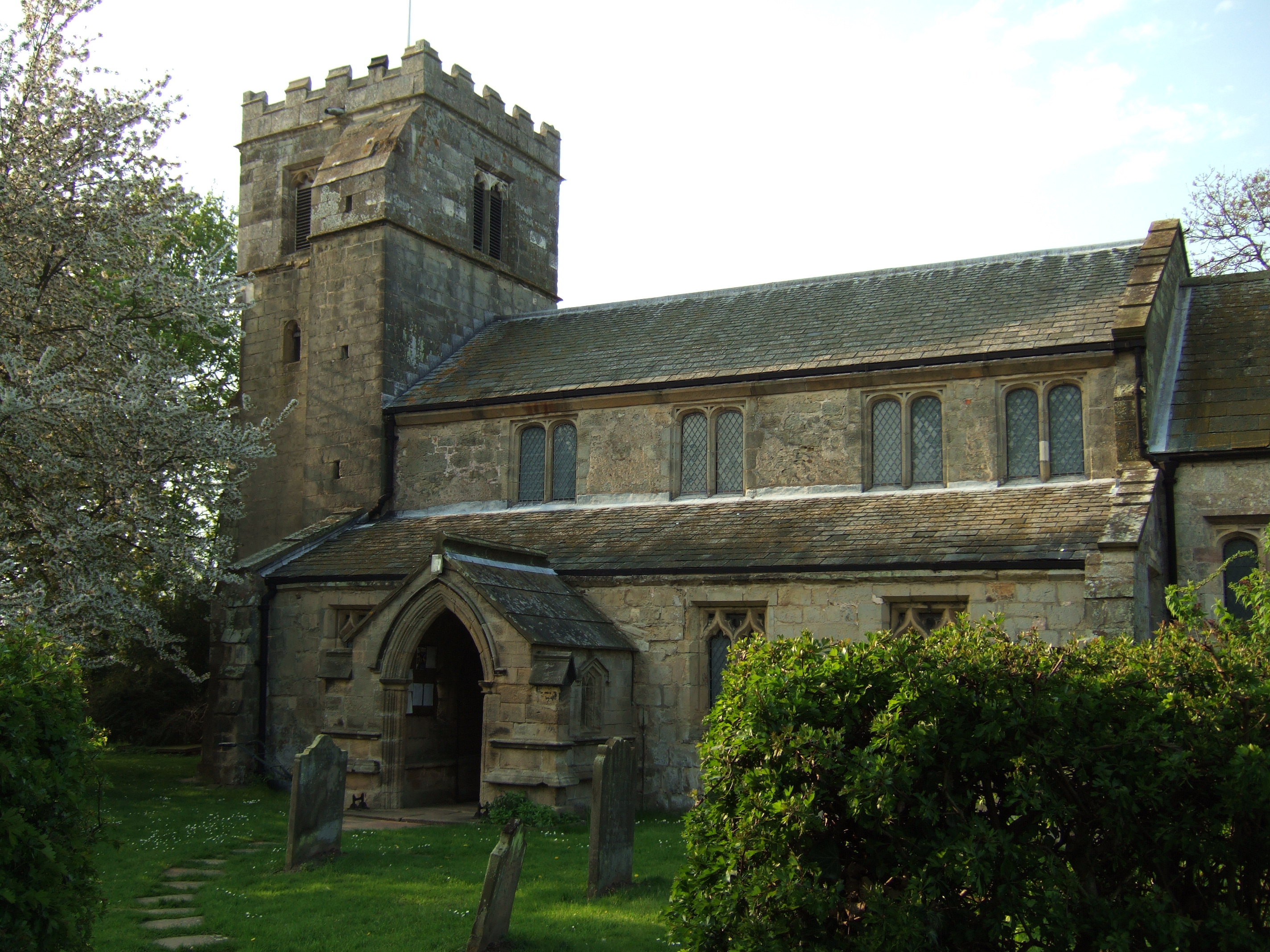
St Michael's Church

the large marble tablet erected in the village church, St Michael's, commemorating the death of John Edward Leveson Jervis, 4th Viscount St. Vincent, in the battle of Abou Klea in 1885; the naming of one of the village public houses, the St. Vincent Arms; and the naming of local streets, St. Vincent's Close and Jervis Court.

In 1967 the church was designated a Grade I listed building and is now recorded in the National Heritage List for England, maintained by Historic England. Sutton Bridge, Yorkshire, across the River Derwent, is Grade II* listed.

The Old Rectory is a Grade II Listed house built in 1854 by J. B. and W. Atkinson.

Facilities in the village include a primary school, village hall, tennis club, post office and a public house.

Sutton upon Derwent is home to Woodhouse Grange Cricket Club, winners of the National Village Cricket Knockout in 1995, and runners up in 1999. Both finals were played at Lord's. The ground is located approximately one mile north of the village.

== See also ==
- Listed buildings in Sutton upon Derwent

== Gallery ==
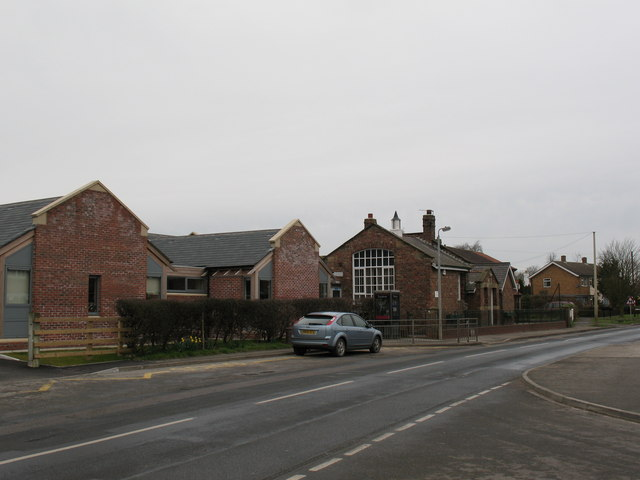
Sutton Primary School

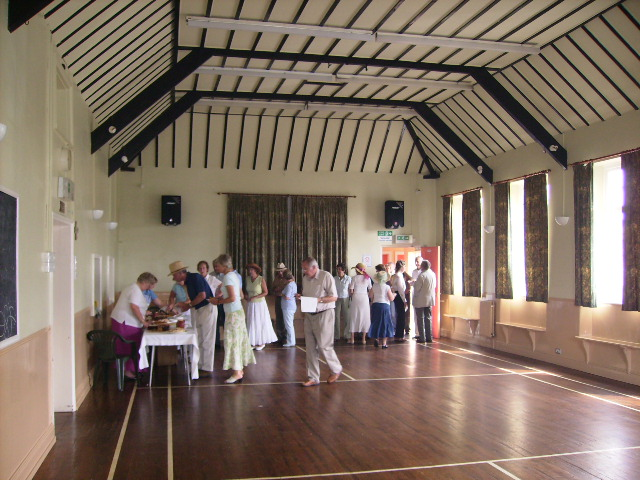
Village Hall Interior

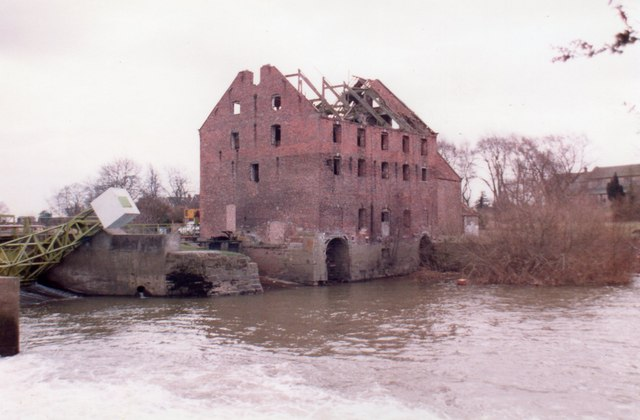
Derelict Water Mill
