= Elvington, North Yorkshire =

Village and civil parish in North Yorkshire, England

Coordinates: 53.920061°N 0.934786°W

Elvington
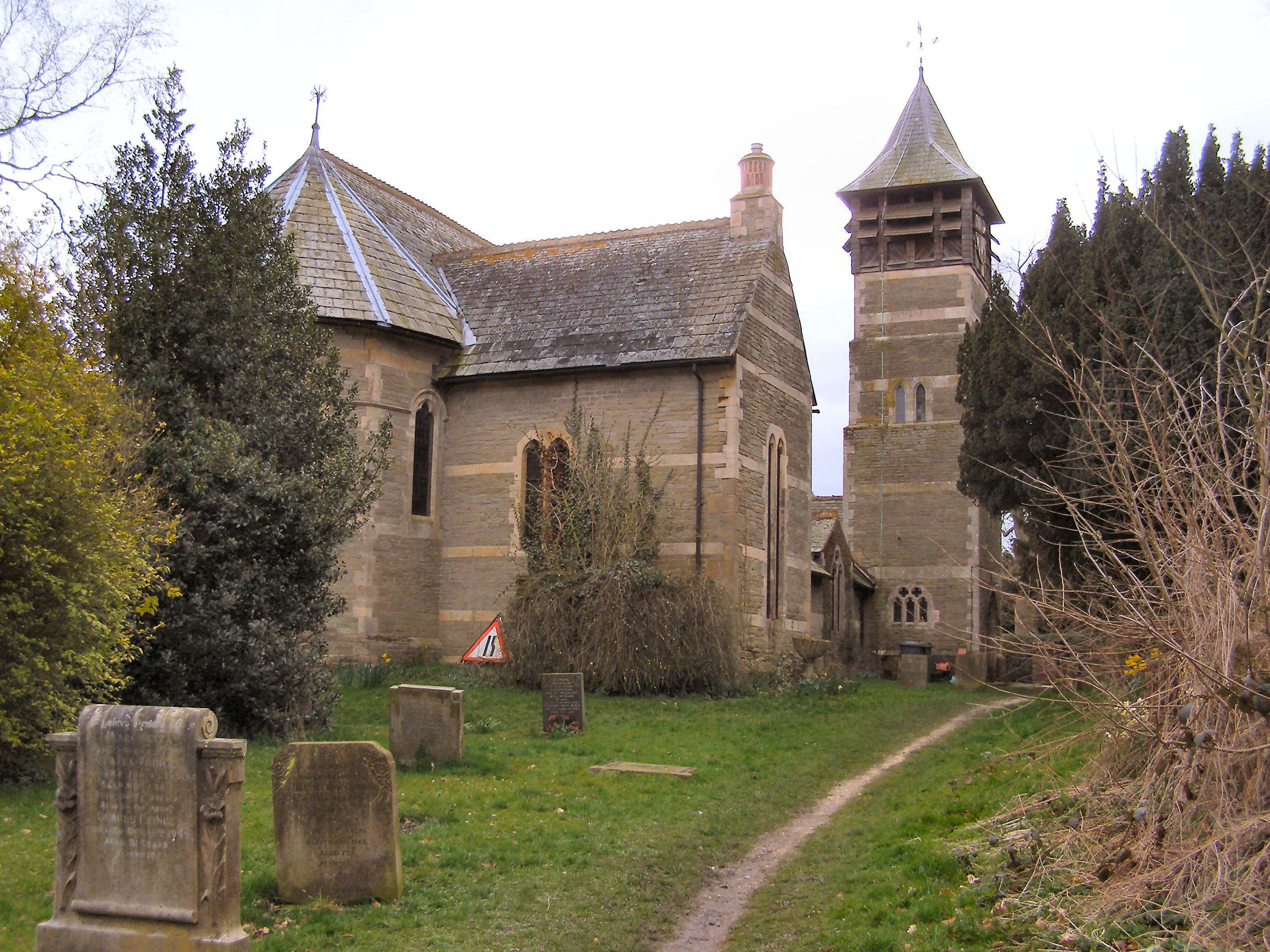
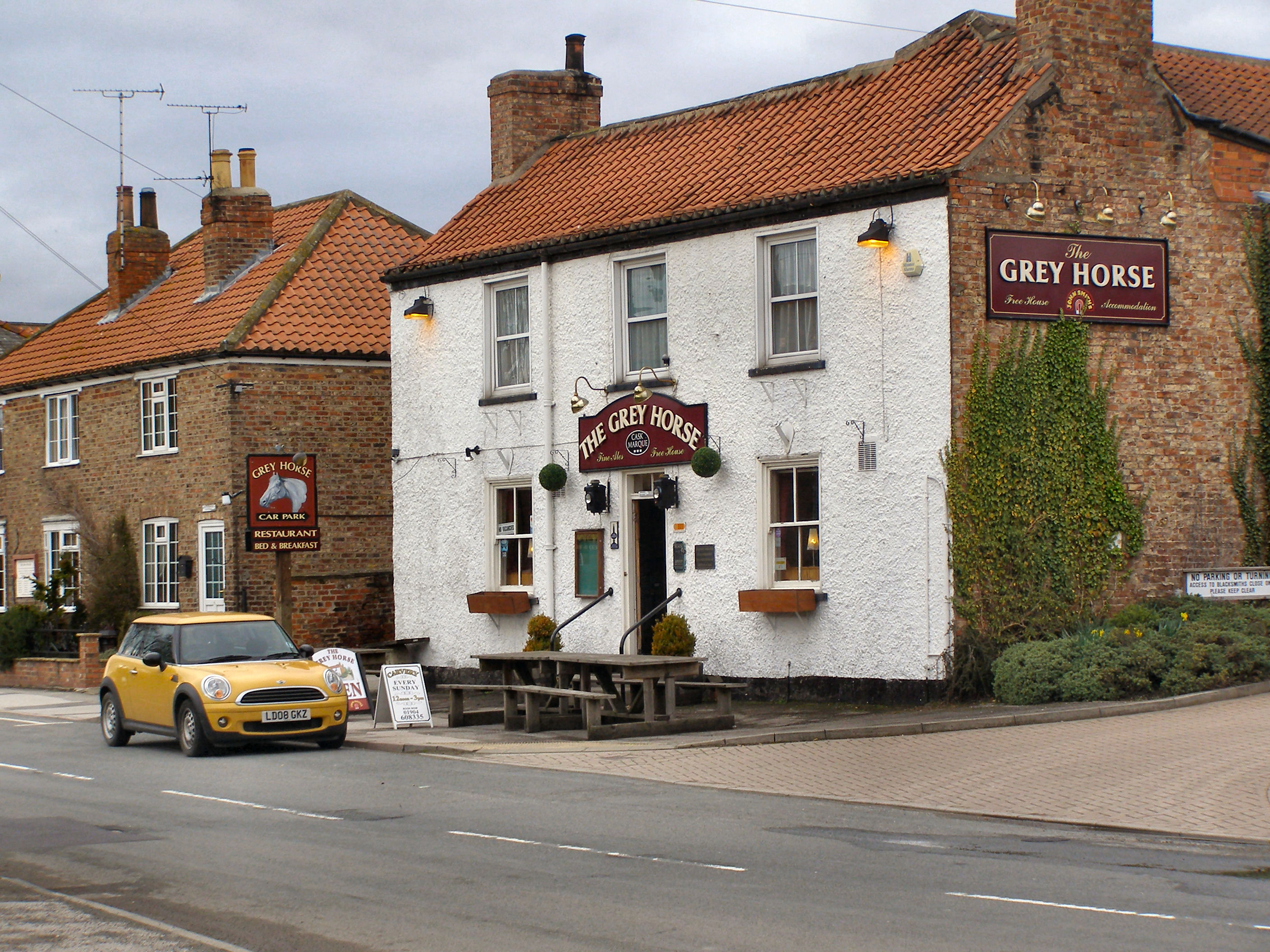
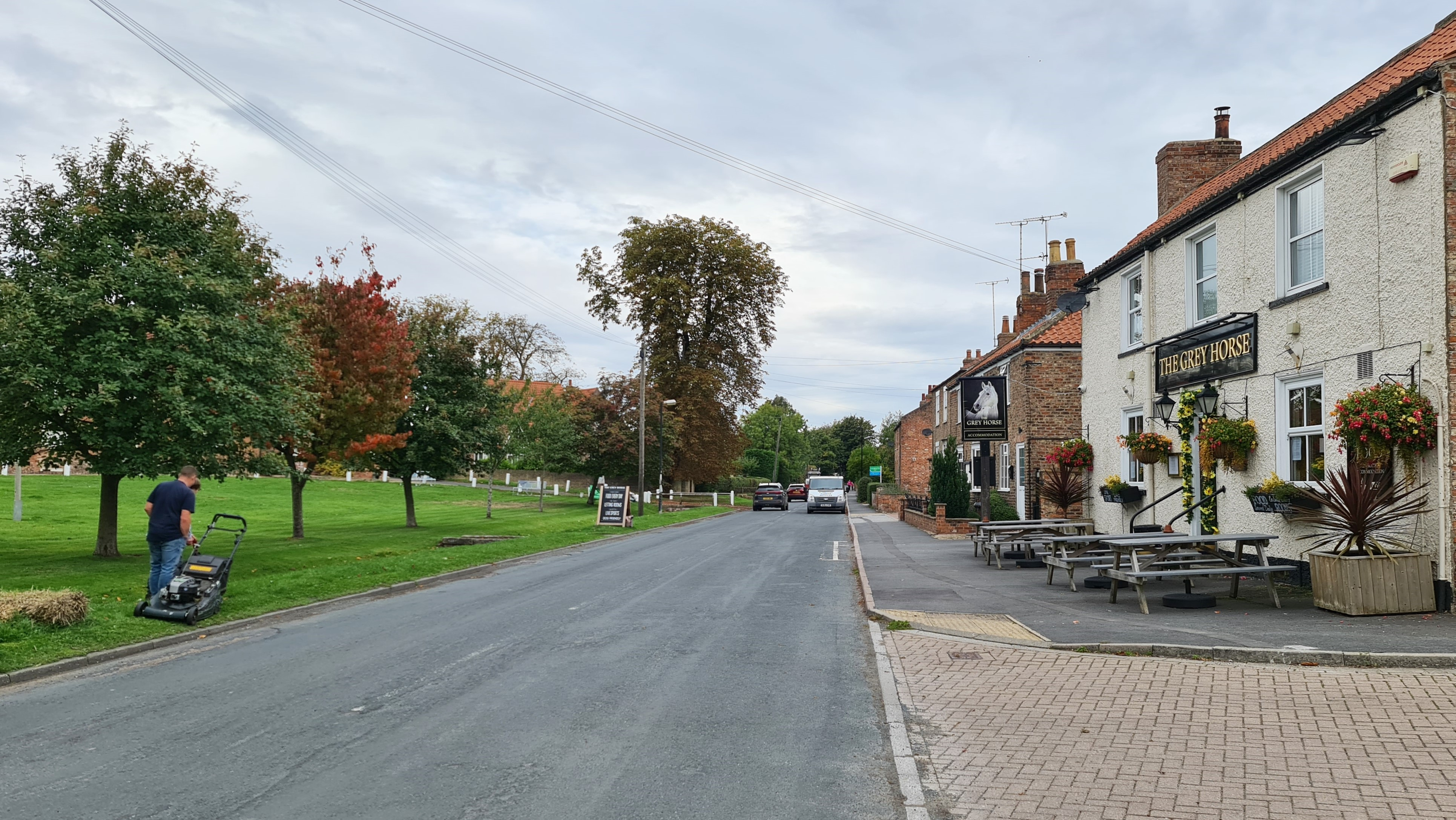
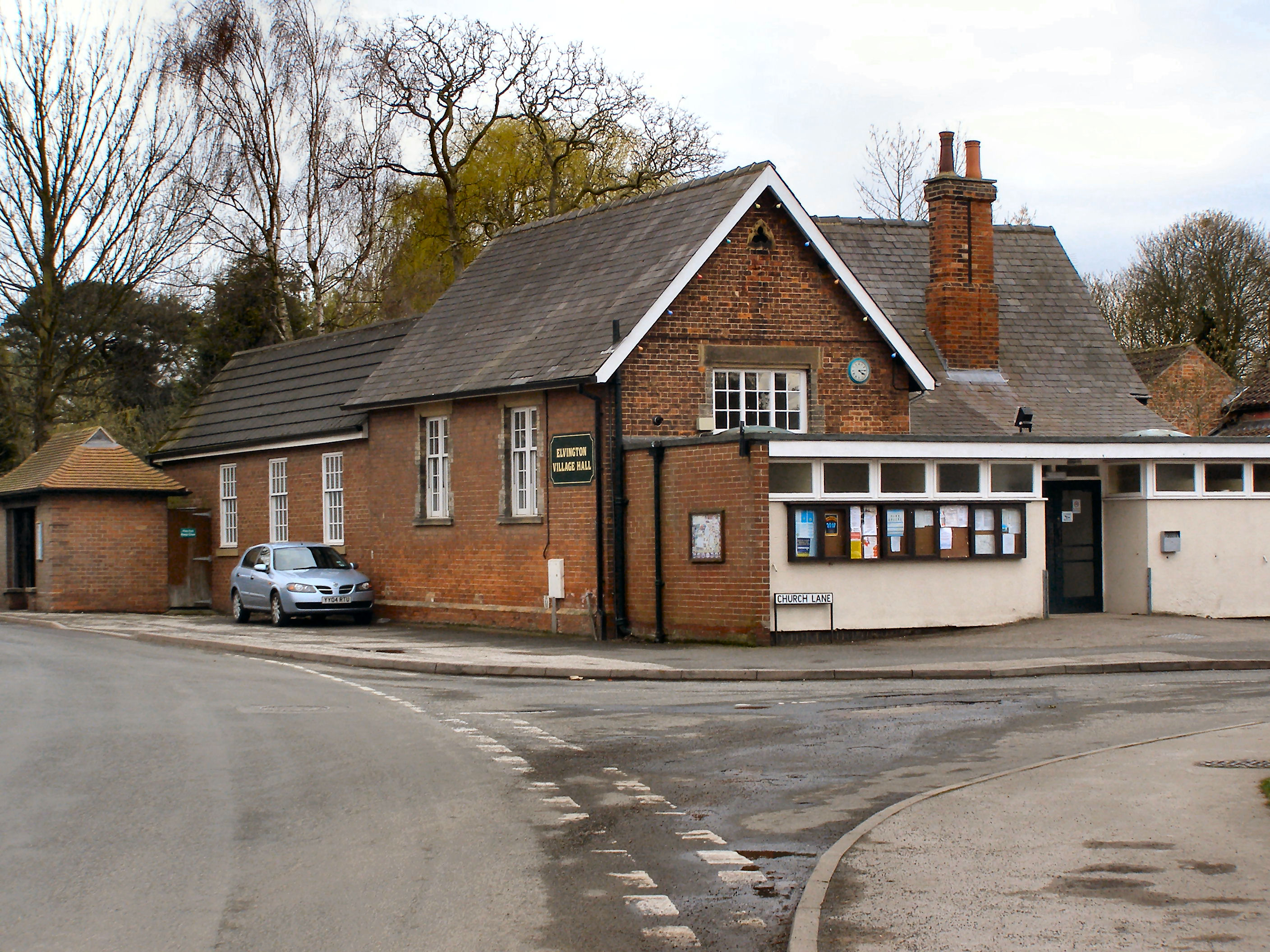
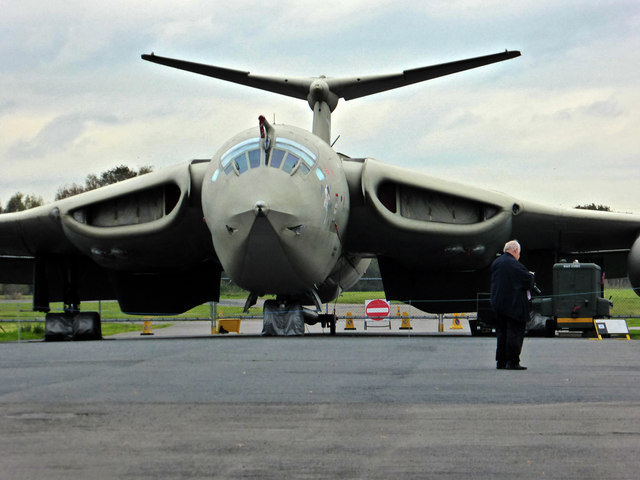
- The Church The Grey Horse Main Street and the Village Green Village Hall The Airfield

- Location within North Yorkshire
- Population: 1,239 (2011 census)
- OS grid reference: SE699476
- Civil parish: Elvington
- Unitary authority: City of York
- Ceremonial county: North Yorkshire
- Region: Yorkshire and the Humber
- Country: England
- Sovereign state: United Kingdom
- Post town: YORK
- Postcode district: YO41
- Dialling code: 01904
- Police: North Yorkshire
- Fire: North Yorkshire
- Ambulance: Yorkshire
- UK Parliament: York Outer

Elvington is a village and civil parish in the City of York, approximately 7 miles (11 km) south-east of York, England, on the B1228 York-Howden road. According to the 2001 census the parish had a population of 1,212, that increased to 1,239 at the 2011 Census. The River Derwent forms part of the parish boundary and the historic Sutton Bridge connects Elvington to Sutton upon Derwent. The village has three large industrial estates including a site for Yara International, a Norwegian chemical company.

Elvington, historically in the East Riding of Yorkshire, became part of the Selby District of the shire county of North Yorkshire between 1974 and 1996. Since 1996 it has been part of the City of York unitary authority.

== History ==
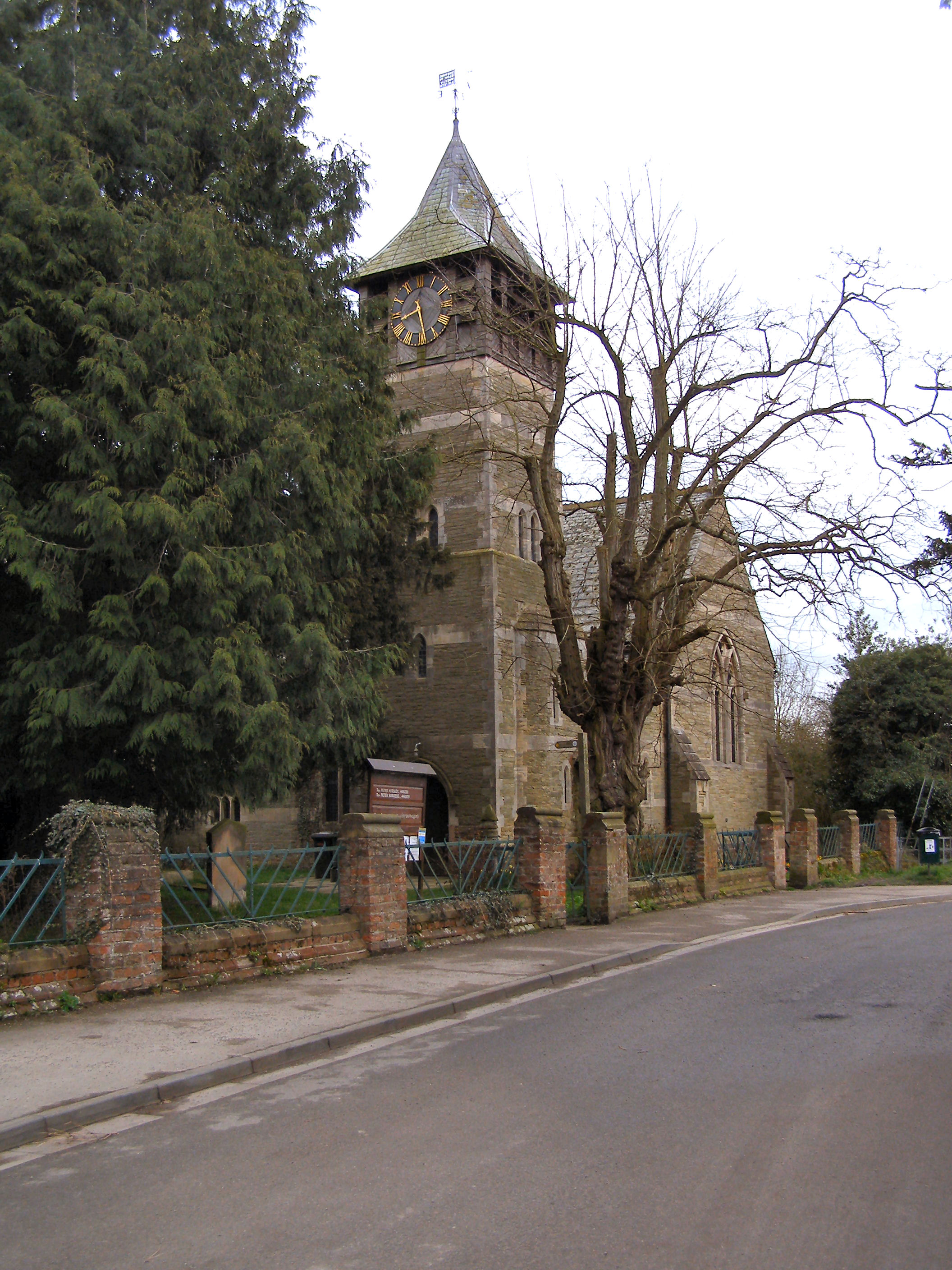
Holy Trinity Church

The village is mentioned in the Domesday Book, which records that in 1086 Ulfketill had six carucates of taxable land, where three ploughs were possible. The entry also refers to a church, which has Norman origins.

Richard Neville, 16th Earl of Warwick, held the manor until his death. The village contains the Grade II*-listed Elvington Hall. Built during the Elizabethan period, it was remodelled in the 18th century by John Carr. Laurence Sterne lived there for part of his childhood, and his grandparents, Roger Jacques and Simone Sterne, held the manor before 1700.

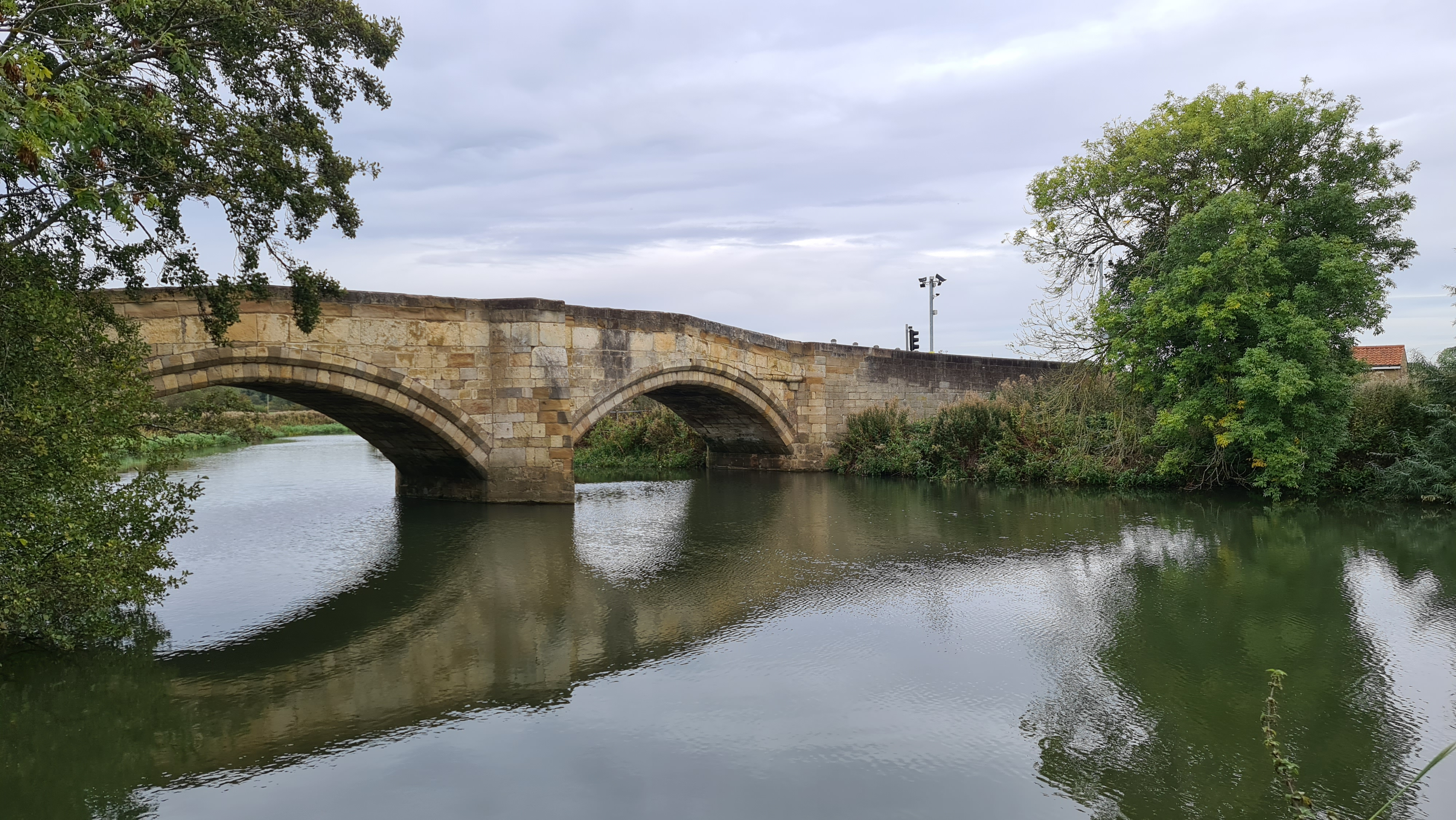
Sutton Bridge crosses the border into the East Riding of Yorkshire

=== 1900s onwards ===
Between 1913 and 1926 Elvington was served by a passenger service on the Derwent Valley Light Railway. The line was open for freight traffic until 1973.

During 1942, the airfield RAF Elvington was built for use in the Second World War. The airfield was vacated in 1958 and by May 1986 parts of it were turned into the Yorkshire Air Museum, open to the general public. The airfield had the status of a relief landing ground until September 1992. It is now used for motorsports and an airshow.

The village was once the home of the author and screenwriter, Hugo Charteris, who died of cancer in 1970 at his home in the village.

=== Today ===
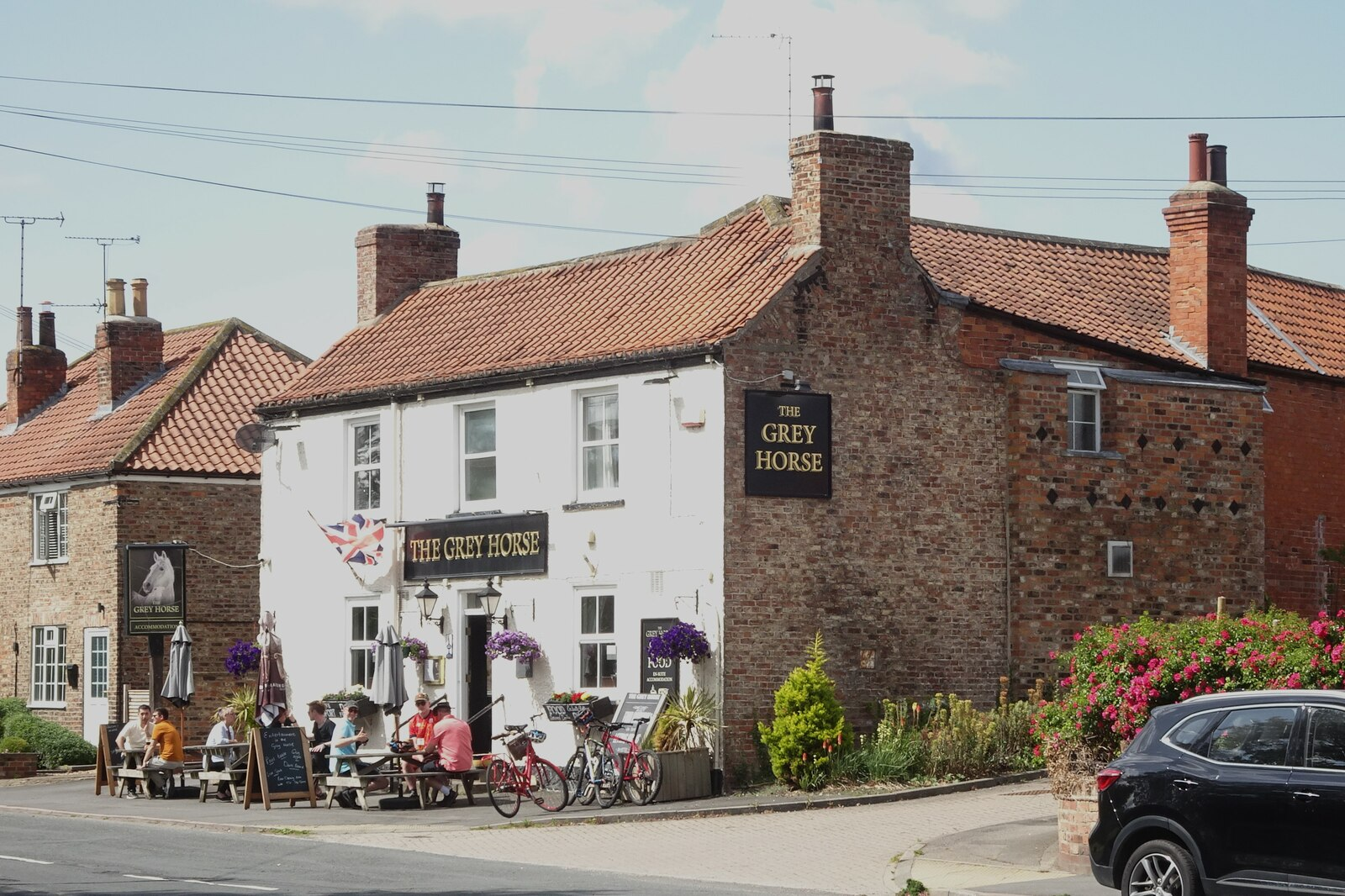
The Grey Horse in 2025

Elvington was designated a conservation area in 1990.

The Grey Horse Inn is a public house in the centre of the village. The village also has a church, shop, primary school, and sports field. A number of organised clubs and societies operate in the village, including drama, Scouts, various sewing groups, a youth group, a toddler group and playgroup.

Elvington has one of the most unusual homes in Britain. In 2006, a derelict bowling alley was converted into a private home whilst still incorporating a 55-foot-long (17 m) bowling lane. The original bowling alley was built in the 1950s for US troops stationed at RAF Elvington and was a regular meeting place for members of Strategic Air Command.

Elvington is home to the turf growers Rolawn, one of Europe's largest companies of its kind.

== Murder of Chen Cai Guan ==
In January 2009, Chinese national Chen Cai Guan was tortured and beaten to death in a warehouse on the Elvington Industrial Estate. The men responsible for the murder, Huang Bao Lung, and Zhang Zhouli admitted links to the 14K Triad, a Hong Kong based criminal gang. Huang and Zhang rented the warehouse as part of a nationwide cannabis factory operation, using a food storage business as a front.

In March 2009, the body of Mr Chen was found by fishermen at a canal in the village of Burn, just south of Selby. When the North Yorkshire Police raided the facility shortly after the murder took place, they seized 1,500 cannabis plants and arrested the suspects and found traces of the victim's blood that they had failed to cover up. In July, Huang, from Fujian in China and Zhang, from Dong Bei, were handed life sentences with minimum terms of 18 years and 16 years respectively after being convicted of murder.

== Elvington Harriers ==
Founded in 1999, Elvington Harriers Football Club is an FA Charter Standard Club. The club has age group teams from the 'Saturday Morning Club' and Under-7's through to Under-15's. Each age group team plays in the club's yellow shirts and blue shorts in the Selby District League. The home games for each age-group are played in Elvington at the Lower Derwent Sports & Social Club. The club is financed through player subscriptions and fund-raising activities.

== Airfield ==
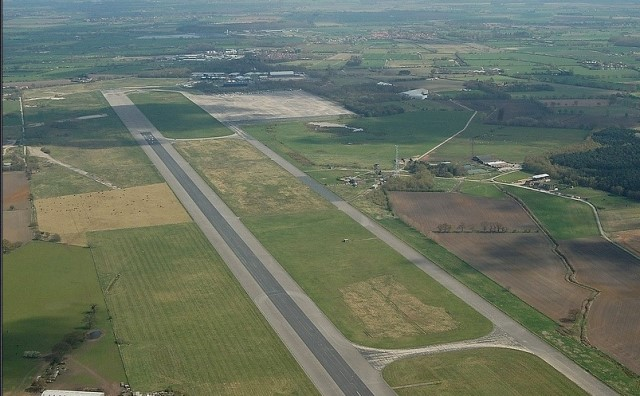
Aerial view of the runway

The Yorkshire Air Museum is based at Elvington Airfield, a former Second World War bomber station. The main runway was expanded in the Cold War era to become one of the longest in Europe, which enabled it to accept large American bombers such as the B52. The Yorkshire Airshow, the largest in the North of England, was held here annually (now bi-annually) during August.

The airfield has a race track, which is used for drag racing and other motorsport events. In November 1966, Italian motor scooter rider Alberto Ancillotti on his Lambretta bike established the 106 mph terminal speed record at this venue. In the 1970s the airfield was the outdoor location for a series of Oh No, It's Selwyn Froggitt!, a situation comedy on British television.

=== Top Gear Vampire dragster crash ===
During filming of a Top Gear segment filmed at the airbase on 20 September 2006, Richard Hammond was injured in the crash of the jet-powered car he was piloting. He was travelling at 288 mph (463 km/h) at the time of the crash.

== See also ==
- Listed buildings in Elvington, North Yorkshire

== Gallery ==
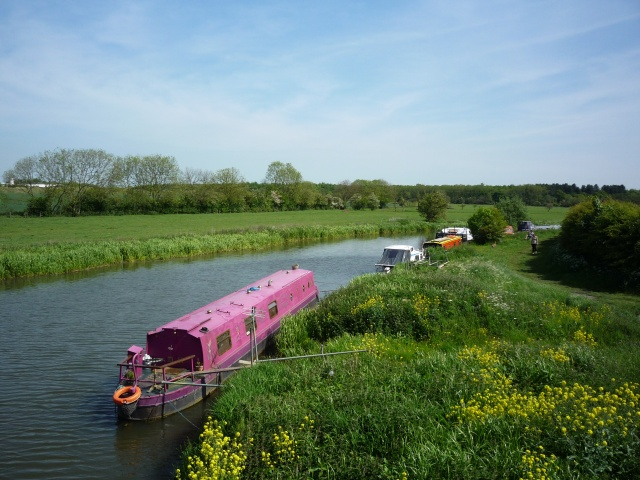
Boats on the Derwent

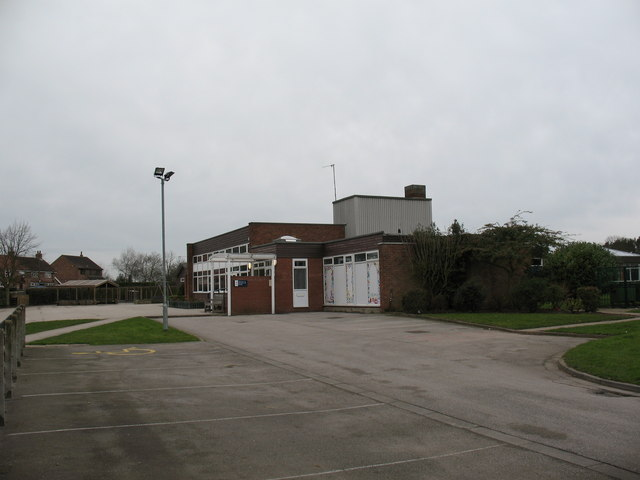
Elvington Primary School

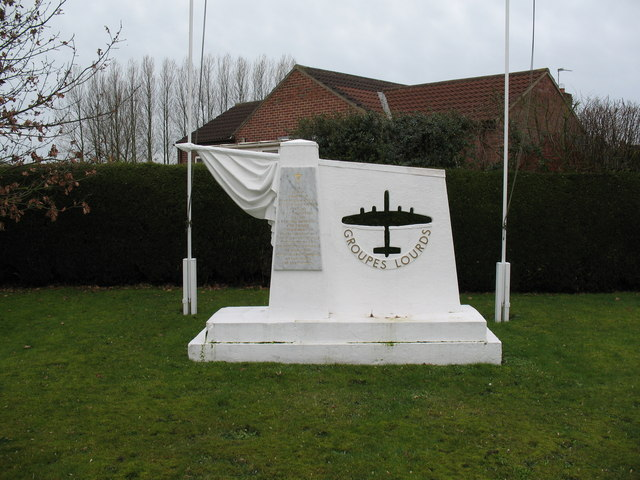
War Memorial

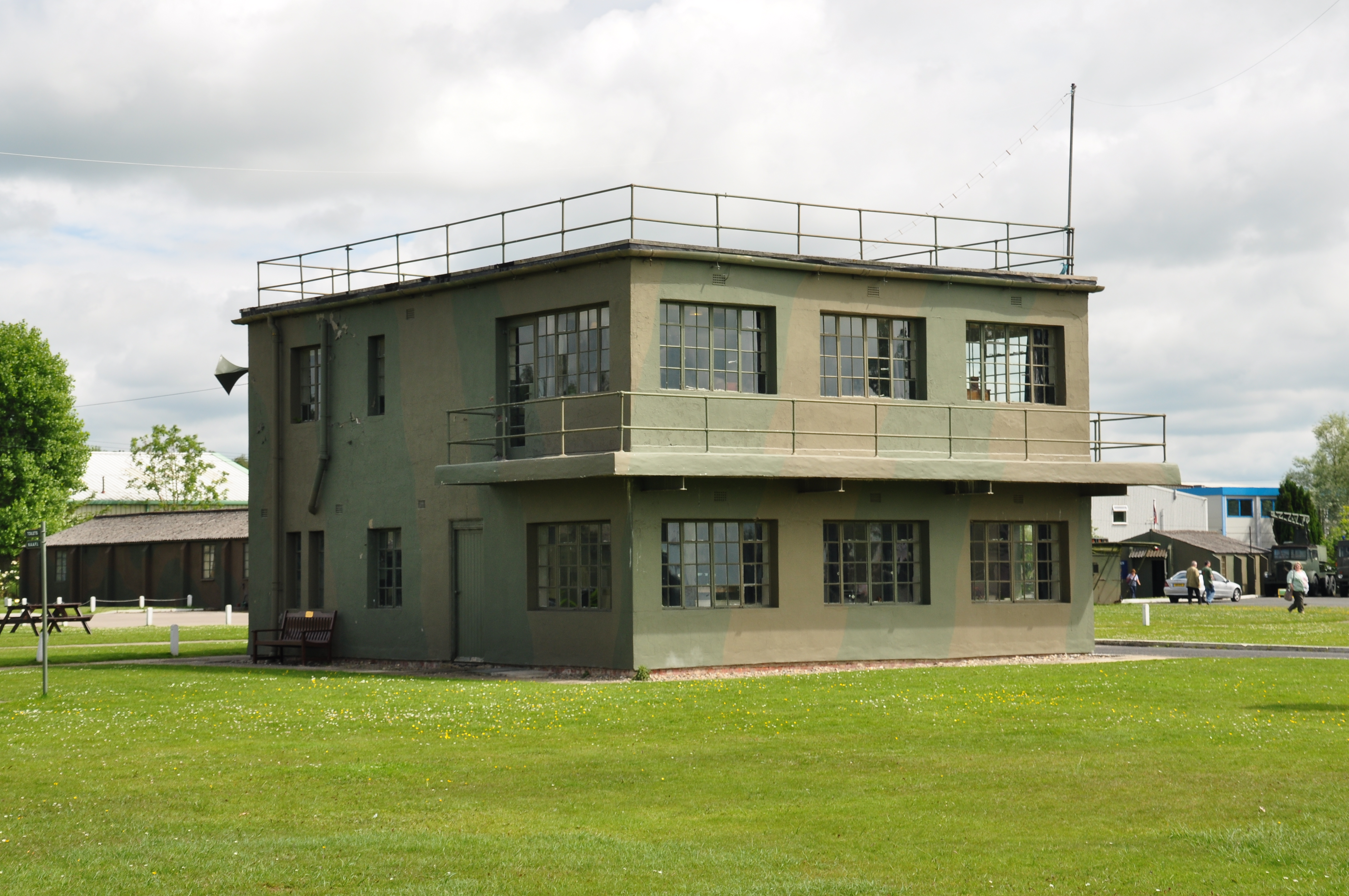
Yorkshire Air Museum

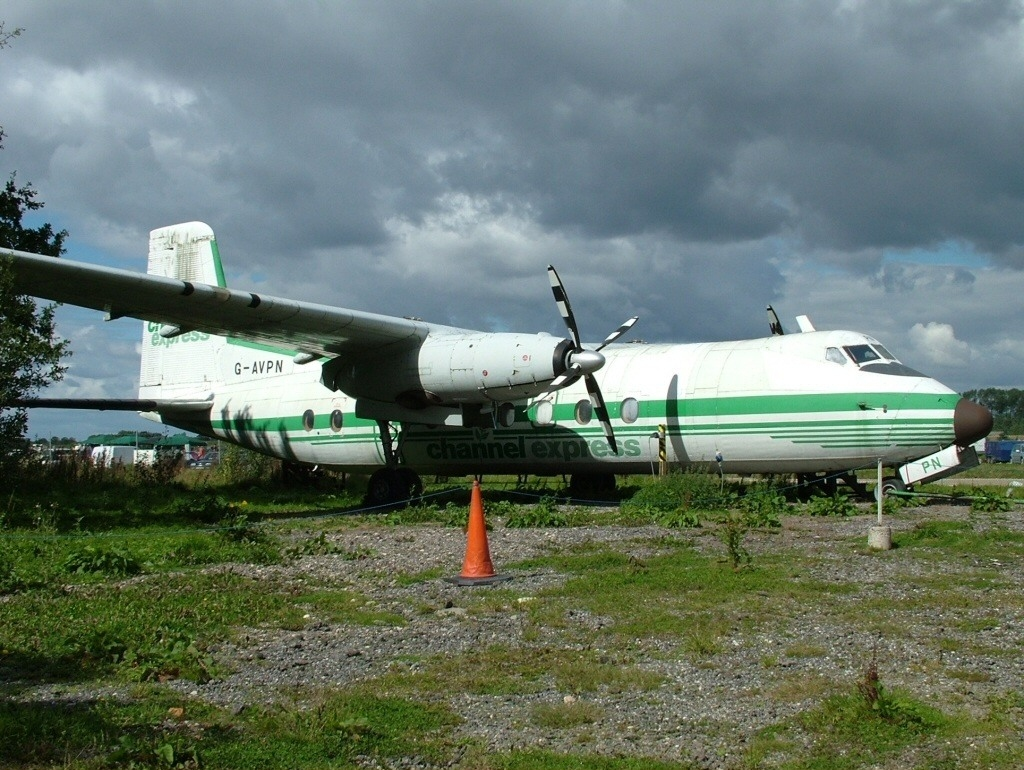
Large Aircraft at the Air Museum

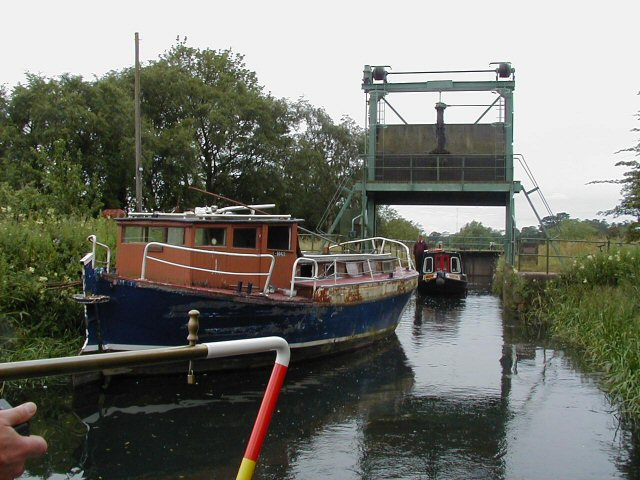
Elvington Lock

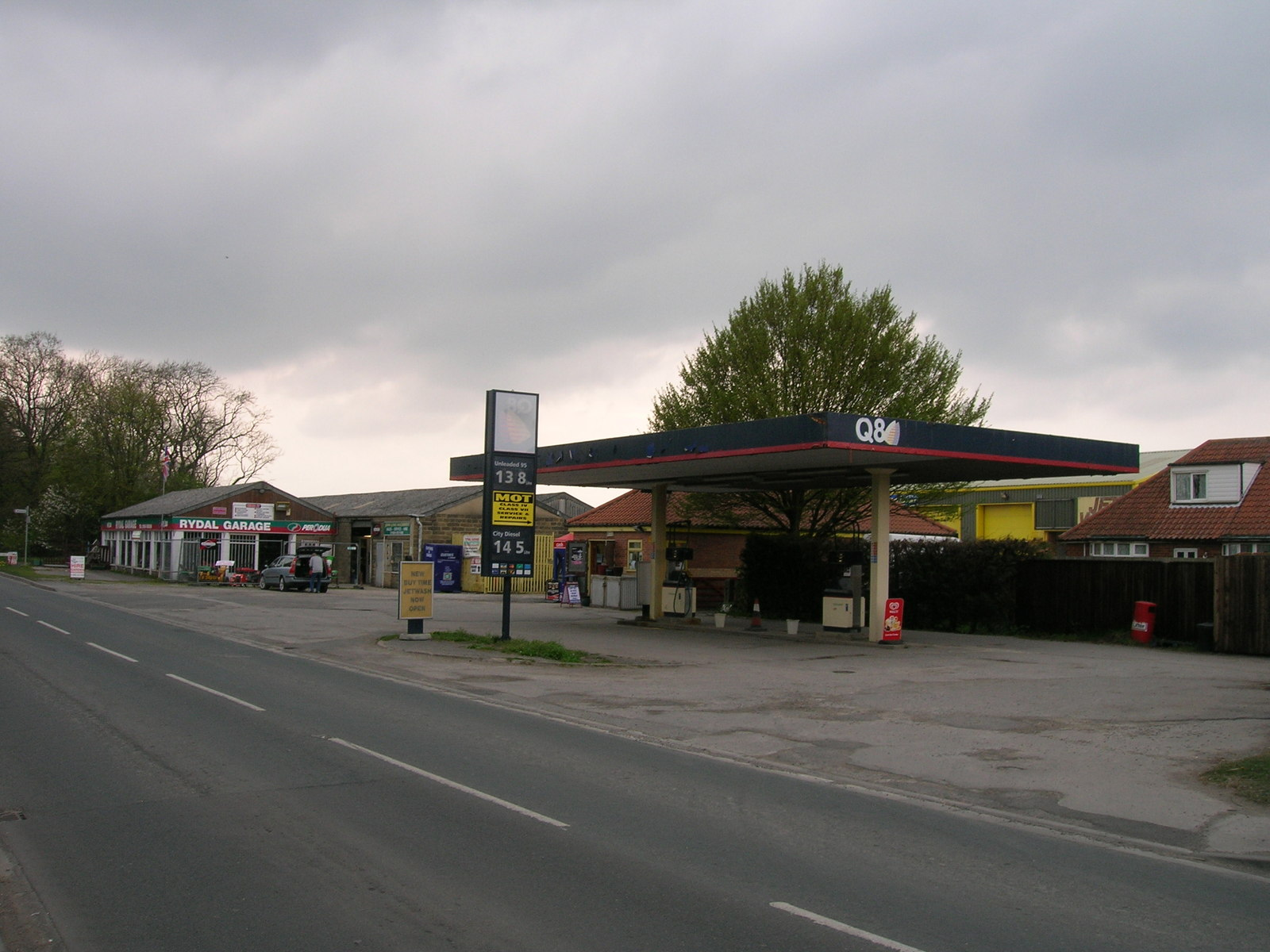
Services

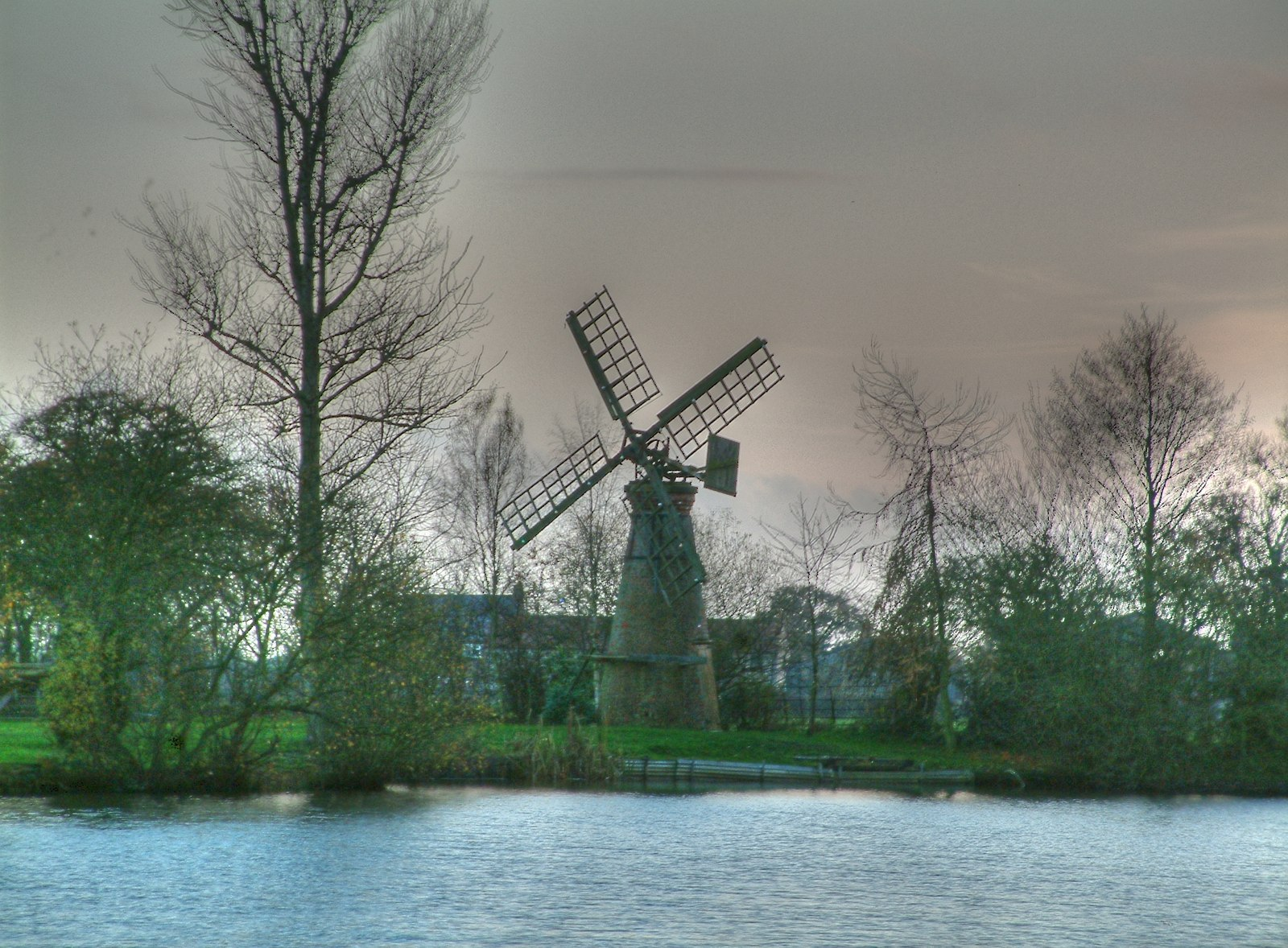
The Old Windmill
