= Water Lilies (Monet series) =

Series of paintings by Claude Monet

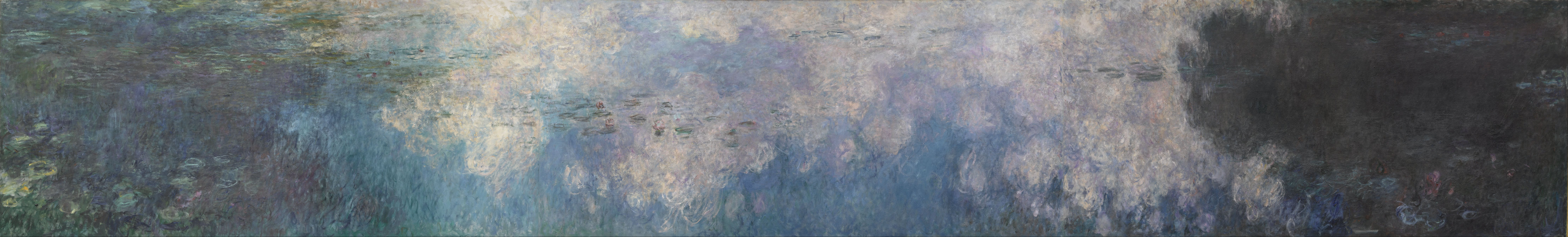
Claude Monet, The Water Lilies – The Clouds, 1920–1926, Musée de l'Orangerie, Paris

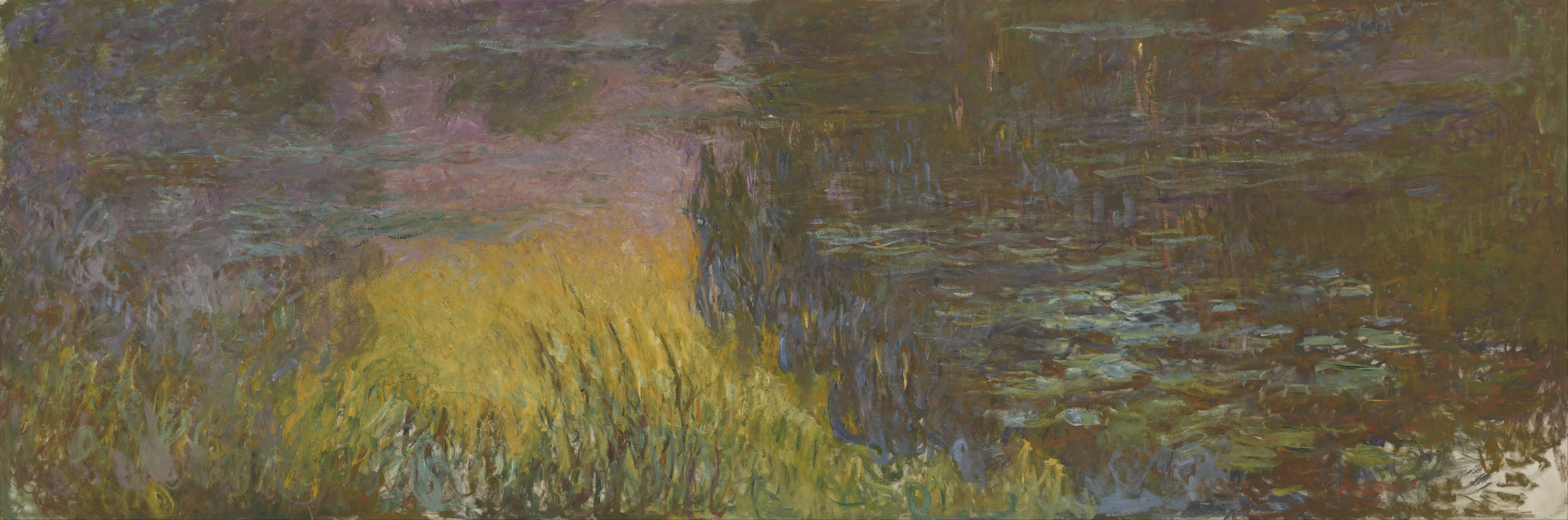
Claude Monet, The Water Lilies – Setting Sun, 1920–1926, Musée de l'Orangerie, Paris

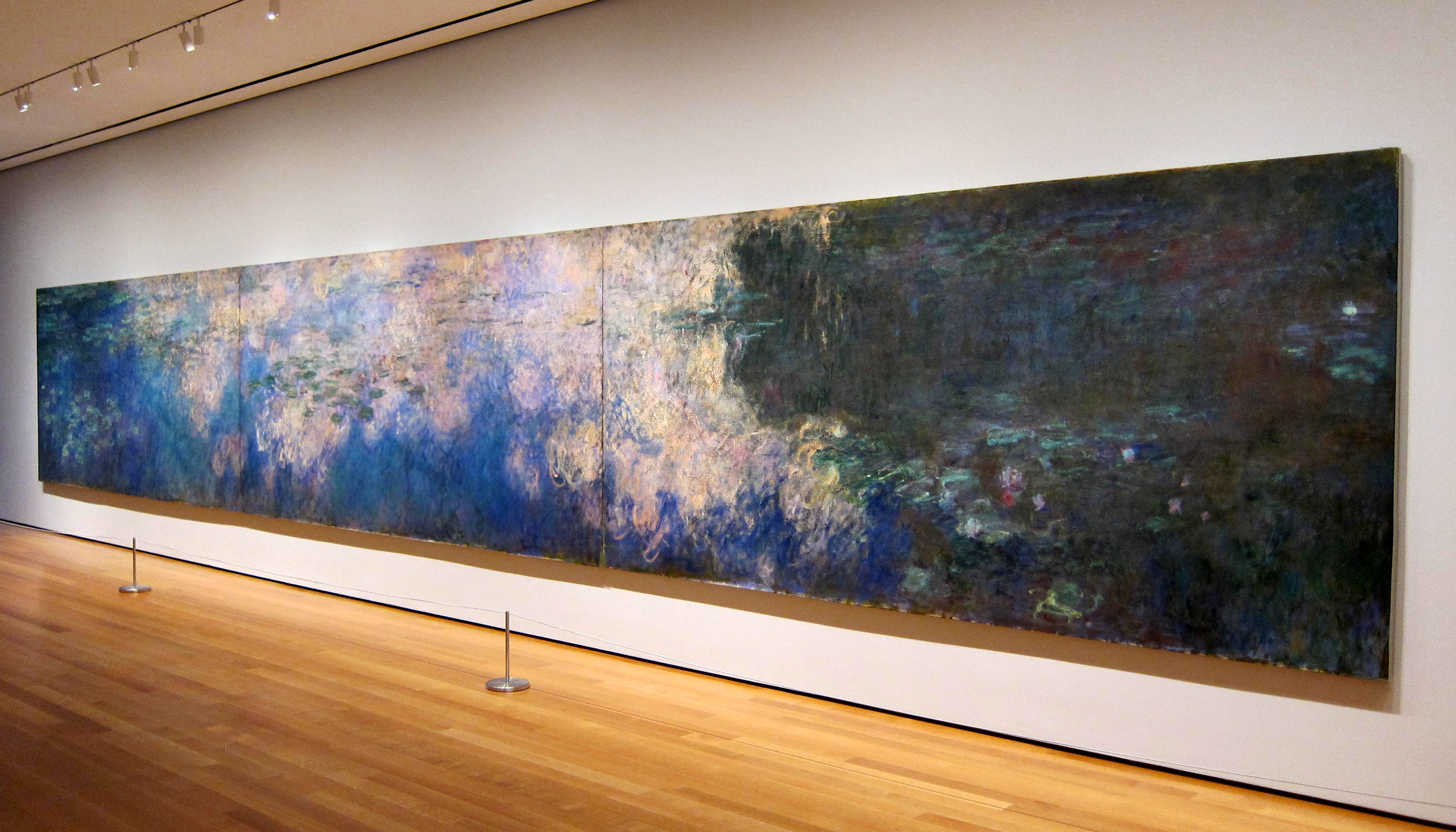
Claude Monet, Reflections of Clouds on the Water-Lily Pond, c. 1920, 200 × 1276 cm (78.74 × 502.36 in), oil on canvas, Museum of Modern Art, New York City

Water Lilies (French: Nymphéas [nɛ̃.fe.a]) is a series of approximately 250 oil paintings by French Impressionist Claude Monet (1840–1926). The paintings depict his flower garden at his home in Giverny, and were the main focus of his artistic production during the last 31 years of his life. Many of the works were painted while Monet suffered from cataracts.

== Background ==
Monet's long-standing preference for producing and exhibiting a series of paintings related by subject and perspective began in 1889, with at least ten paintings done at the Valley of the Creuse, which were shown at the Galerie Georges Petit. Among his other famous series are his Haystacks.

During the 1920s, the state of France built a pair of oval rooms at the Musée de l'Orangerie as a permanent home for eight large water lily murals by Monet. The exhibit opened to the public on 16 May 1927, a few months after Monet's death. Sixty water lily paintings from around the globe were assembled for a special exhibition at the Musée de l'Orangerie in 1999.

The paintings are on prominent display at museums all over the world, including the Musée Marmottan Monet, the Musée d'Orsay in Paris, the National Gallery in London, the Metropolitan Museum of Art, Museum of Modern Art in New York, the Art Institute of Chicago, the Saint Louis Art Museum, the Nelson-Atkins Museum of Art in Kansas City, Missouri, the Carnegie Museum of Art, Princeton University Art Museum, the National Museum of Wales, the Musée des Beaux-Arts de Nantes, the Toledo Museum of Art, the Cleveland Museum of Art, the Portland Art Museum, and the Legion of Honor. In 2020, the Museum of Fine Arts, Boston celebrated its 150th anniversary with some of Monet's Water Lilies paintings.

== The paintings at auction ==
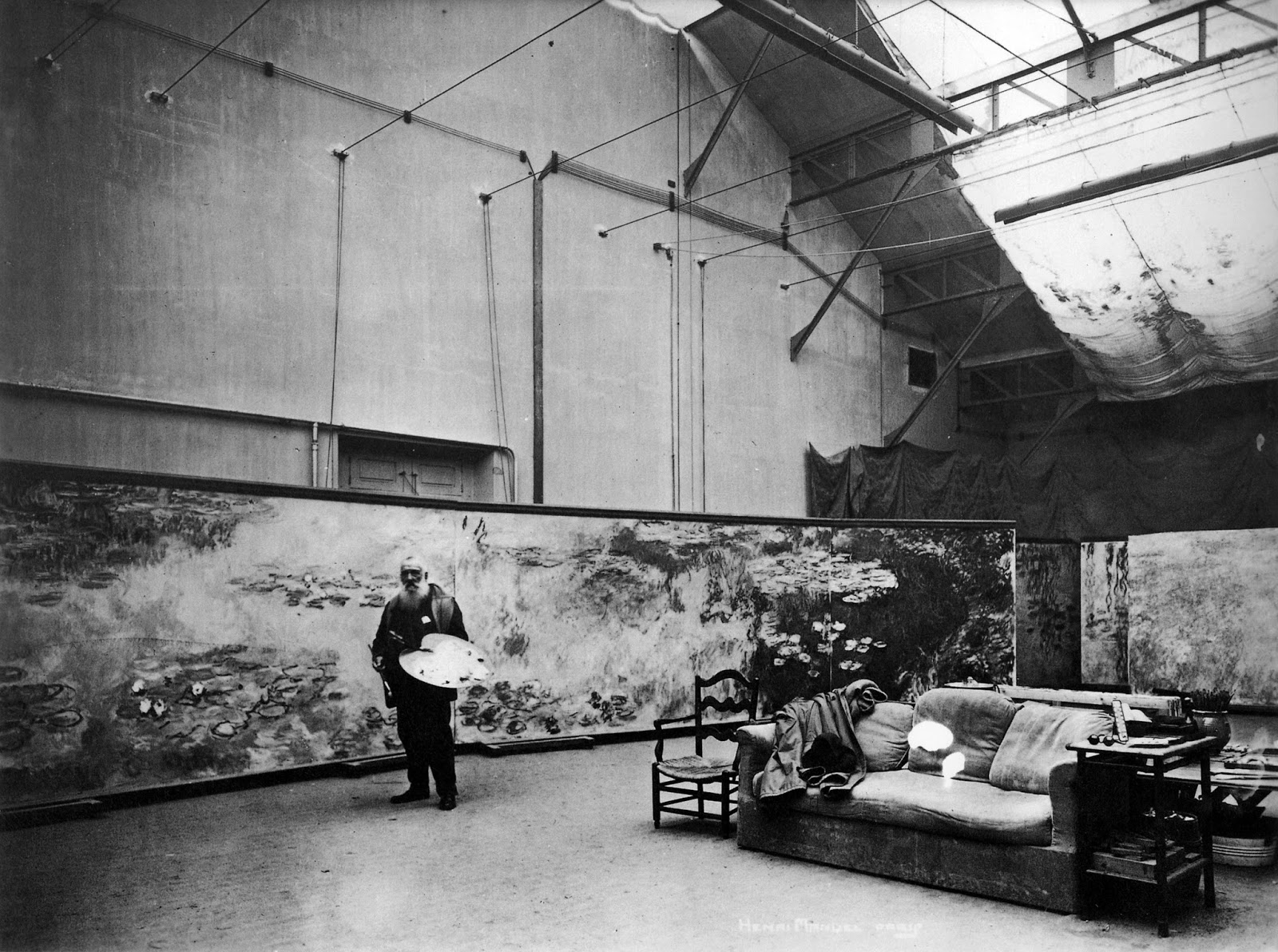
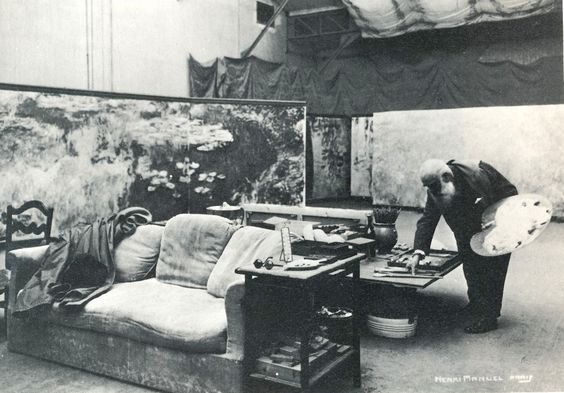
Monet painted the bigger works of his Water Lily series in a large studio at his home in Giverny, France. The studio is now used as the home's giftshop.

On 19 June 2007, one of Monet's Water Lily paintings sold for £18.5 million at a Sotheby's auction in London. On 24 June 2008 another of his Water Lily paintings, Le Bassin Aux Nymphéas, sold for almost £41 million at Christie's in London, almost double the estimate of £18 to £24 million.

In May 2010, it was announced that the 1906 Nymphéas work would be auctioned in London in June 2010. The painting had an estimated sale price of between £30 and £40 million. Giovanna Bertazzoni, Christie's auction house director and head of impressionist and modern art, said, "Claude Monet's water-lily paintings are amongst the most recognised and celebrated works of the 20th Century and were hugely influential to many of the following generations of artists." The sale took place on 23 June 2010 at the auction house and the painting attracted bids of up to £29 million, but it ultimately failed to sell.

On 6 May 2014, one of the Water Lilies, Le Bassin aux Nymphéas, was auctioned at Christie's, New York City for $27 million.

In June 2014, one of the Water Lilies, Nymphéas, sold for US$54 million at a Sotheby's auction in London. This piece was auctioned to an anonymous buyer, but the piece went on to be part of the exhibition "Painting the Modern Garden: From Monet to Matisse" at the Cleveland Museum of Art and the Royal Academy of Arts, London, starting in 2015. The co-chairman of Sotheby's modern and impressionist art department, Helena Newman, claims that the result is at the top of the original estimated selling price. This price was between 34 and 51 million USD.

While many of Monet's masterpieces have sold, there are still an estimated 250 oil paintings from this series. The collection is widely popular, with many of these pieces residing in exhibits. The paintings have been catalogued by Daniel Wildenstein in his Monet: Catalogue Raisonné.

== Gallery ==
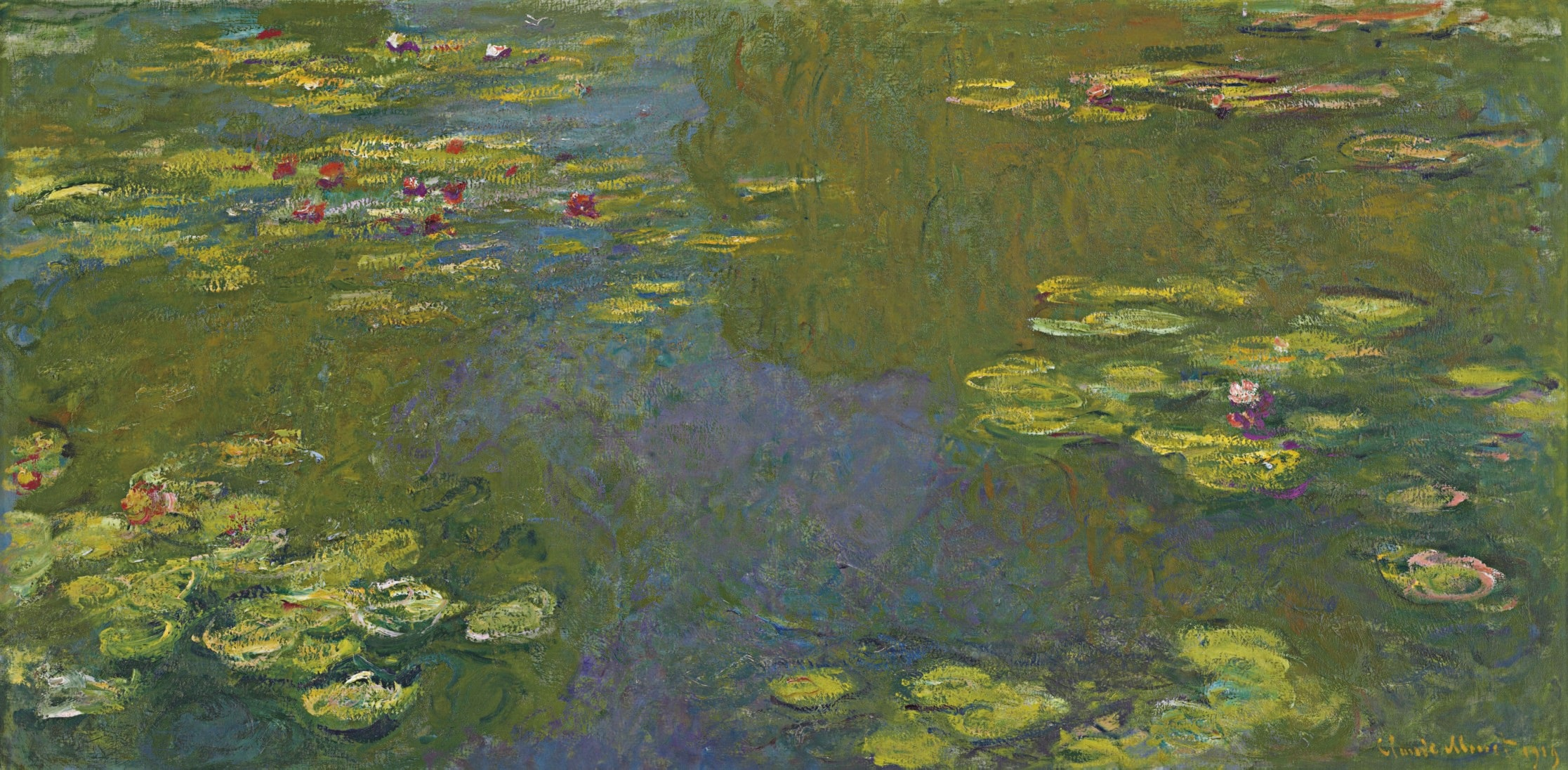
Le Bassin Aux Nymphéas, 1919, private collection

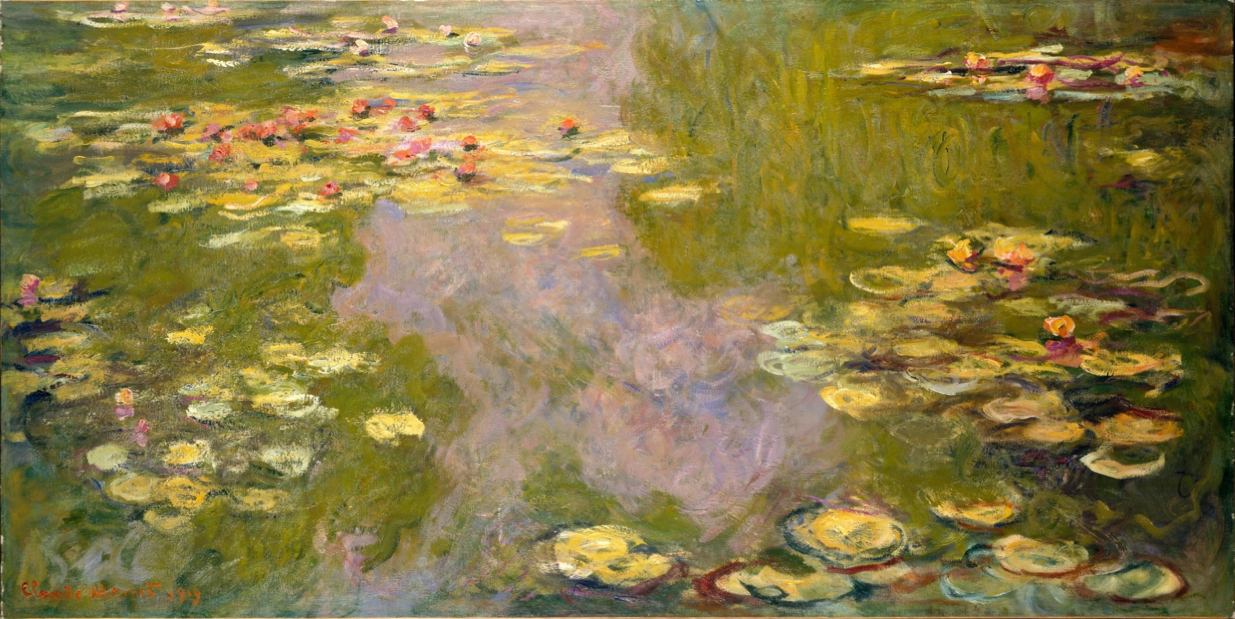
Water Lilies, 1919, Metropolitan Museum of Art, New York City

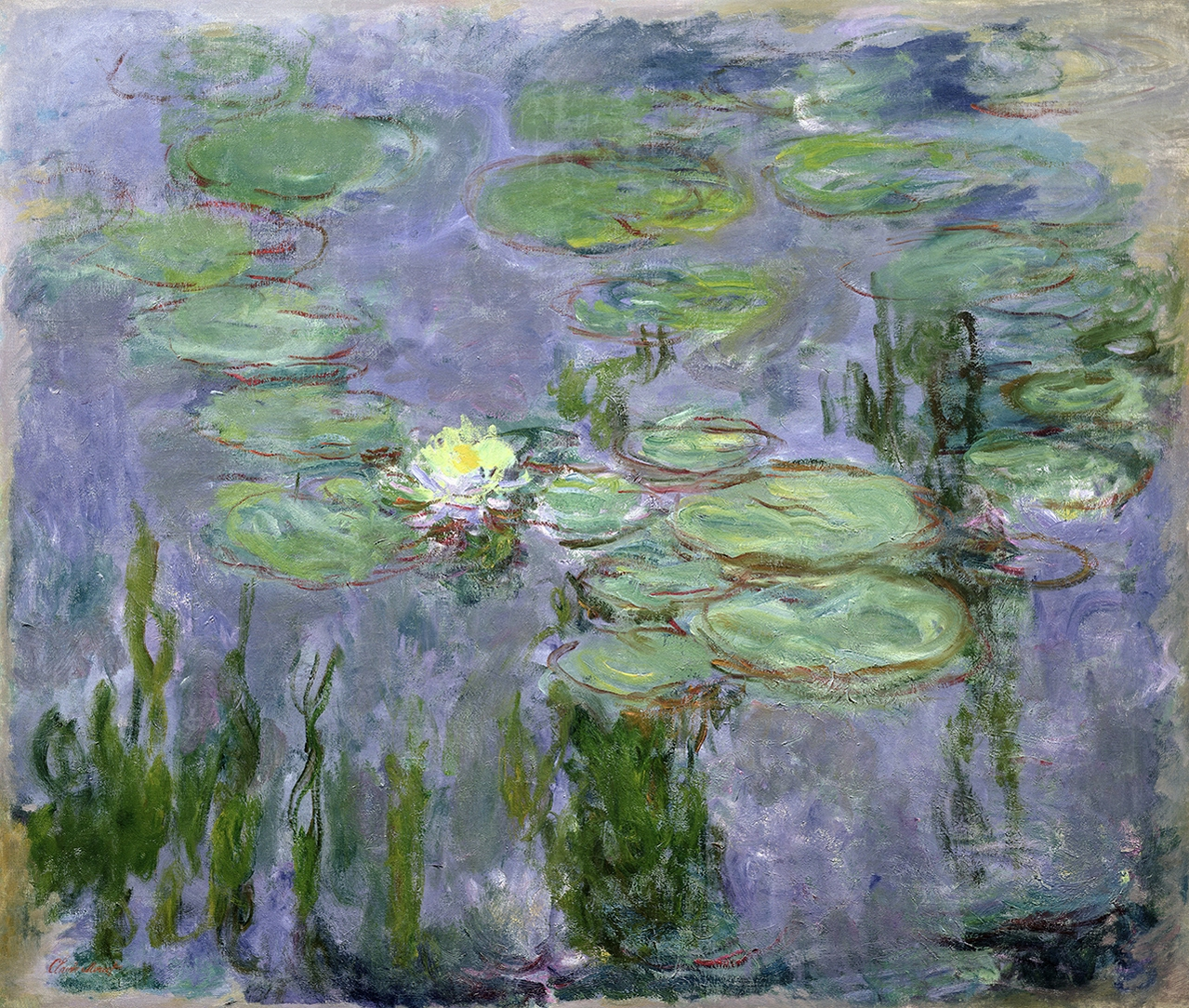
Nymphéas, 1915, Musée Marmottan Monet

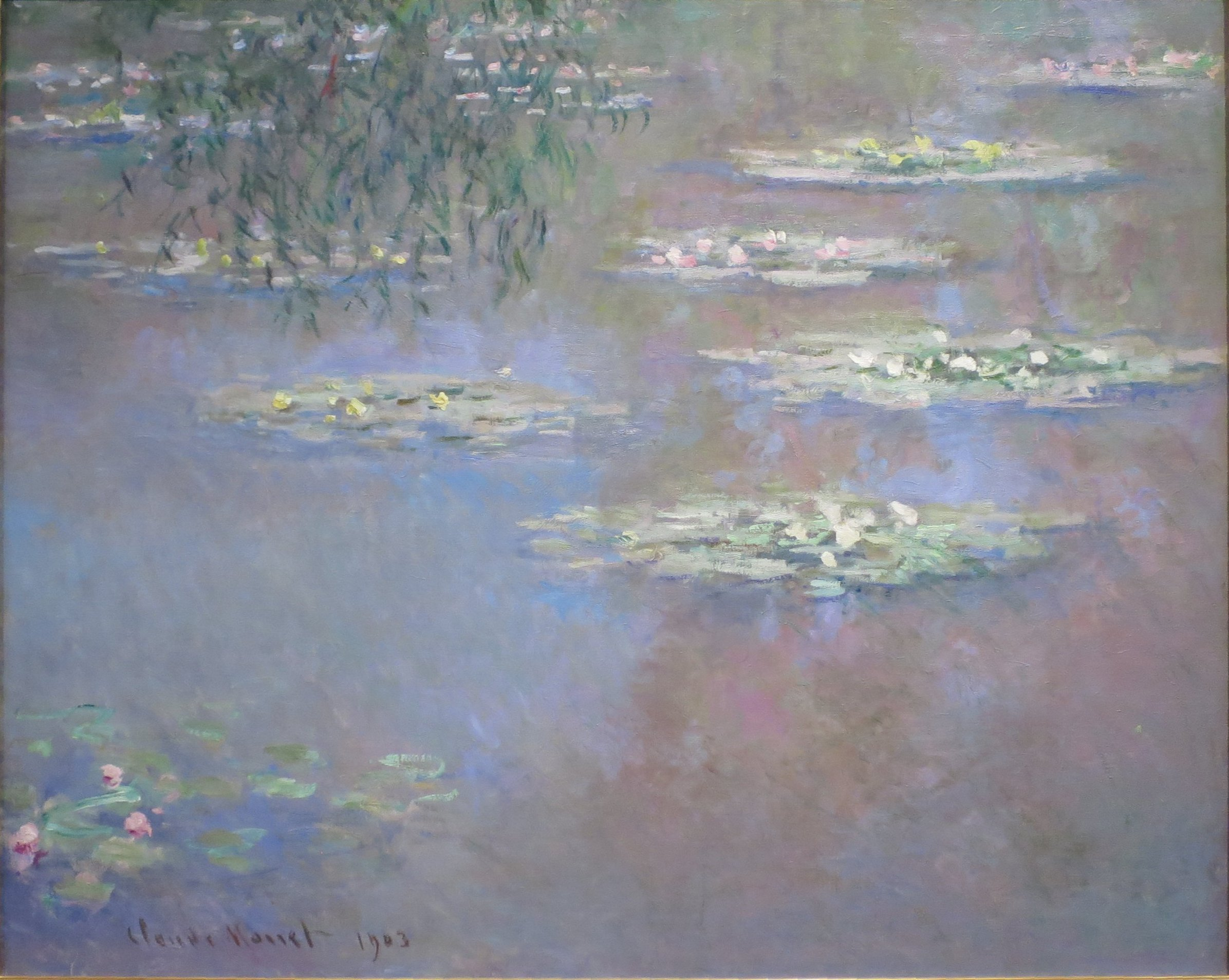
Water-Lilies, 1903, Dayton Art Institute

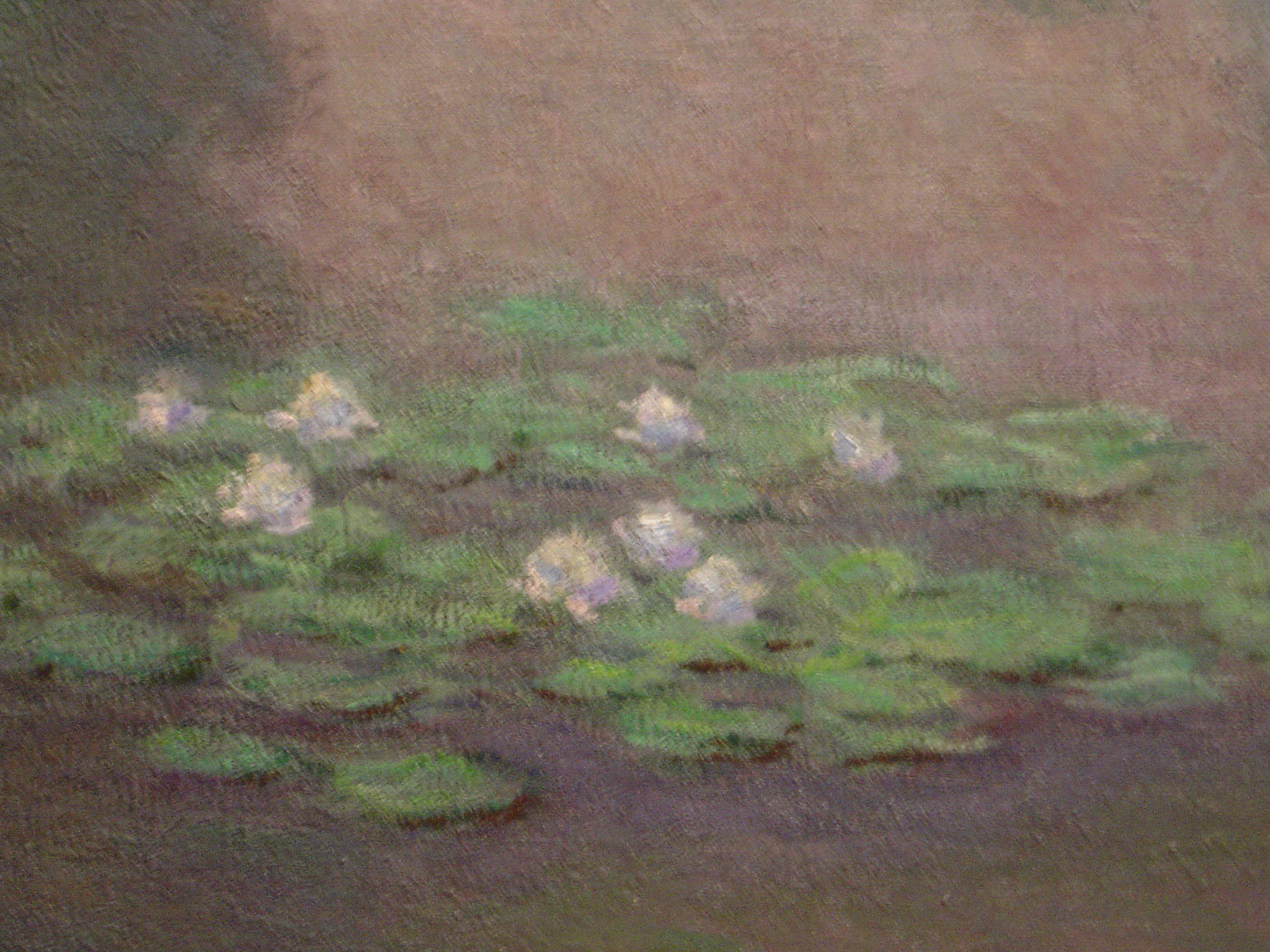
Closeup of Water lily pond, one of 18 views of the pond, 1899, Boston Museum of Fine Arts

== List of Water Lily paintings ==
Image	Title	Date	Museum	Size (cm)	Catalog No
	Water Lilies	1897–1898	Los Angeles County Museum of Art	65 x 100	W.1501
	Water Lilies	1897–1898	Private collection	73 x 100	W.1502
	Water Lilies	1897–1898	Private collection	100 x 100	W.1503
	Water Lilies – Evening Effect	1897–1898	Musée Marmottan Monet, Paris	73 x 100	W.1504
	Water Lilies	1897–1898	Private collection	75 x 100	W.1505
	Water-Lilies	1897–1899	Kagoshima City Museum of Art	89 x 130	W.1506
	Water Lilies	1897–1899	Galleria Nazionale d'Arte Moderna, Rome	81 x 100	W.1507
	Water-Lilies	1897–1899	Private collection	130 x 152	W.1508
	Water Lilies and Japanese Bridge	1899	Princeton University Art Museum	90 x 90	W.1509
	The Water Lily Pond	1899	Private collection	93 x 90	W.1510
	The Water Lily Pond	1899	Pola Museum of Art, Kanagawa	89 x 92	W.1511
	Japanese Bridge and Water Lily Pond	1899	Philadelphia Museum of Art	89 x 93	W.1512
	White Water Lilies	1895	Pushkin Museum (Moscow)	89 x 92	W.1513
	The Water-Lily Pond	1899	Private collection	89 x 92	W.1514
	The Lily Pond, Green Harmony	1898	Musée d'Orsay, Paris	89 x 93	W.1515
	The Lily Pond	1899	National Gallery, London	88 x 92	W.1516
	Japanese Footbridge	1899	National Gallery of Art, Washington D.C.	81 x 100	W.1517
	Bridge over the Lily Pond	1899	Metropolitan Museum of Art, New York	93 x 74	W.1518
	Water-Lily Pond	1899	Unknown	Known from a photograph of the studio	W.1519
	Bridge over the Water-Lilies	1899	MM Khalil Museum, Cairo	116 x 89	W.1520
	Water Lily Pond	1900	Art Institute of Chicago	89 × 100	W.1628
	Water-Lily Pond, Symphony in Rose	1900	Musée d'Orsay, Paris	90 x 100	W.1629
	The Water-Lily Pond	1900	Museum of Fine Arts, Boston	90 x 92	W.1630
	The Japanese Bridge or The Lily Pond	1900	Private collection	89 x 92	W.1631
	Water-Lily Pond: Water Irises	1900	Private collection	89 x 100	W.1632
	Water-lily Pond and Path by the Water	1900	Private collection	89 x 100	W.1633
	Water-Lilies, Clouds	1903	Private collection	73 x 100	W.1656
	Water-Lilies	1903	Dayton Art Institute	81 x 100	W.1657
	Water-Lilies	1903	Bridgestone Museum of Art, Tokyo	81 x 100	W.1658
	Water-Lily Pond	1903	Known only from photographs		W.1659
	Water-Lilies	1903	Musée Marmottan Monet, Paris	73 x 92	W.1660
	Water-Lilies	1903	Musée Marmottan Monet, Paris	89 x 100	W.1661
	Water-Lilies	1904	Private collection	81 x 100	W.1662
	Water-Lily Pond	1904	Known only from photograph		W.1663
	Lily Pond	1904	Museum of modern art André Malraux - MuMa, Le Havre	90 x 96	W.1664
	Water-Lilies	1904	Private collection	90 x 92	W.1665
	Lily Pond	1904	Denver Art Museum	88 x 91	W.1666
	Water-Lilies	1904	Musée des Beaux-Arts de Caen	90 x 92	W.1667
	The Bridge over the Water-Lily Pond	1905	Private collection	90 x 100	W.1668
	Lily Pond, the Bridge	1905	Private collection	95 x 100	W.1669
	The Water-Lily Pond and Bridge	1905	Private collection	86 X 100	W.1670
	Water-Lilies	1905	Museum of Fine Arts, Boston	89 x 100	W.1671
	Water-Lilies	1905	Private collection	89 x 99	W.1672
	Water-Lilies	1905	Private collection	90 X 100	W.1673
	Water-Lilies	1905	Private collection	90 x 100	W.1674
	Water-Lilies	1905	Private collection	89 x 92	W.1675
	Water-Lilies	1905	Private collection	89 x 100	W.1676
	Water-Lilies	1905	Unknown	Known only from a photograph	W.1677
	Water-Lilies	1905	Private collection	73 x 105	W.1678
	Water-Lilies	1905	Private collection	81 x 100.5	W.1679
	Water-Lilies	1905	National Museums & Galleries of Wales, Cardiff	82 x 101	W.1680
	Water-Lilies	1905	Private collection	73 x 105	W.1681
	Water-Lilies	1906–07	Private collection	73 x 100	W.1682
	Water Lilies	1906	Art Institute of Chicago	89.9 × 94.1	W.1683
	Water-Lilies	1906–07	Private collection	90 x 100	W.1684
	Water-Lilies	1906–07	Private collection	81 x 92	W.1685
	Water-Lilies	1906–07	Private collection	90 x 93	W.1686
	Water-Lilies	1906–07	Private collection	91 x 100	W.1687
	Water-Lilies	1906–07	National Museums & Galleries of Wales, Cardiff	81 x 92	W.1688
	Water-Lilies	1906–07	Ohara Museum of Art, Kurashiki	73 x 92	W.1689
	Water-Lilies	1908	Kunstmuseum, Saint Gallen	90 x 93	W.1690
	Water-Lilies	1907	Museum of Art, Yamagata	81 x 92	W.1691
	Water-Lilies	1907	Private collection	89 x 130	W.1694
	Water-Lilies	1907	Musée M Khalil, Cairo	81 x 100	W.1695
	Water-Lilies	1907	Wadsworth Atheneum, Hartford	81 x 92	W.1696
	Water-Lilies	1907	Museum of Fine Arts, Boston	90 x 93	W.1697
	Water-Lilies	1907	Private collection	93 x 89	W.1698
	Water-Lilies	1907	Pola Museum of Art, Kanagawa	93 x 99	W.1699
	Water-Lilies	1907	Private collection	100 x 90	W.1700
	Water-Lilies	1907	Musée d'art moderne (Saint-Étienne)	Diam. 81	W.1701
	Water-Lilies	1907	Musée d'art moderne (Saint-Étienne)	Diam. 81	W.1702
	Water-Lilies	1907	Museum of Fine Arts, Houston	91 x 81	W.1703
	Water-Lilies	1907	Private collection	92 x 73	W.1704
	Water-Lilies	1907	Private collection	92 x 73	W.1705
	Water-Lilies	1907	Kawamura Memorial DIC Museum of Art, Sakura	92 x 73	W.1706
	Water-Lilies	1907	Private collection	100 x 82	W.1707
	Water-Lilies	1907	Private collection	100 x 73	W.1708
	Water-Lilies	1907	Private collection	106 x 73	W.1709
	Water-Lilies	1907	Israel Museum, Jerusalem	107 x 73	W.1710
	Water-Lilies	1907	Private collection	93 x 82	W.1711
	Water-Lilies	1907	Private collection	92 x 73	W.1712
	Water-Lilies	1907	Kuboso Memorial Museum of Art, Osaka	82 x 89	W.1713
	Water-Lilies	1907	Musée Marmottan Monet, Paris	100 x 73	W.1714
	Water-Lilies	1907	Bridgestone Museum of Art, Tokyo	100 x 73	W.1715
	Water-Lilies	1907	Gothenburg Museum of Art	105 x 73	W.1716
	Water-Lilies	1907	Musée Marmottan Monet, Paris	105 x 73	W.1717
	Water-Lilies, Reflections on the Water	1907	Musée A André, Bagnols-sur-Cèze	73 x 92	W.1718
	Water-Lilies, Setting Sun	1907	National Gallery, London	73 x 93	W.1719
	Water-Lily Pond, Sketch	1907	Private collection	73 x 107	W.1720
	Water-Lilies	1907	Private collection	90 x 92	W.1721
	Water-Lilies	1907	Private collection	100 x 100	W.1722
	Water-Lilies	1907	Private Collection	100 x 100	W.1723
	Water Lilies	1908	Museum of Vernon	Diam. 81	W.1724
	Water-Lilies	1908	Private collection	92 x 81	W.1725
	Water-Lilies	1908	Private collection	100 x 81	W.1726
	Water-Lilies	1908	Private collection	92 x 89	W.1727
	Water-Lilies	1908	Private collection	92 x 89	W.1728
	Water-Lilies	1908	Dallas Museum of Art	Diam. 80	W.1729
	Water-Lilies	1908	Private collection	100 x 81	W.1730
	Water-Lilies	1908	Tokyo Fuji Art Museum	100 x 90	W.1731
	Water-Lilies	1908	National Museum of Wales, Cardiff	100 x 81	W.1732
	Water-Lilies	1908	Worcester Art Museum	73 x 93	W.1733
	Water-Lilies	1908	Private collection	86 x 90	W.1734
	Water-Lilies	1908	Private collection	100 x 81	W.1735
	The Water-Lily Pond, Rose Arches	1914–1917	Private collection	73 x 100	W.1781
	Water-Lilies with Reflections of Green Grasses	1914–1917	Private collection	130 x 200	W.1782
	Water-Lilies	1914–1917	Musée Marmottan Monet, Paris	130 x 200	W.1783
	Water-Lilies	1914–1917	Private collection	130 x 200	W.1784
	Water-Lilies	1914–1917	Private collection	150 x 200	W.1785
	Water-Lilies	1914–1917	Private collection	130 x 150	W.1786
	Water-Lilies	1914–1917	Private collection	135 x 145	W.1787
	Water-Lilies	1914–1917	Fine Arts Museum, San Francisco	180 x 146	W.1788
	Water Lilies	1914–1917	Private collection	175 x 135	W.1789
	Nymphéas en fleur	1914–1917	Private collection	160 x 180	W.1790
	Water Lilies	1914–1917	Musée Marmottan Monet, Paris	150 x 200	W.1791
	Water Lilies	1914–1917	Private collection	150 x 200	W.1792
	Water Lilies	1914–1917	Asahi beer Oyamazaki Villa Museum of Art, Kyoto	152 x 200	W.1793
	Water Lilies	1914–1917	Museum of Modern Art, Gunma	130 x 90	W.1794
	Water Lilies	1915	Portland Art Museum, Oregon	160 x 180	W.1795
	Water-Lilies	1915	Neue Pinakothek, Munich	151 x 200	W.1796
	Water Lilies	1914–1917	Musée Marmottan Monet, Paris	130 x 153	W.1797
	Water Lilies	1914–1917	Private collection	132 x 84	W.1798
	Water Lilies	1914–1917	Private collection	170 x 122	W.1799
	Water Lilies	1916	National Museum of Western Art, Tokyo	200 x 200	W.1800
	White and Yellow Water Lilies	1914–1917	Kunstverein, Winterthur	200 x 200	W.1801
	Water Lilies	1914–1917	Asahi beer Oyamazaki Villa Museum of Art, Kyoto	200 x 200	W.1802
	Water Lilies	1914–1917	Private collection	200 x 200	W.1803
	Water Lilies	1914–1917	Toledo Museum of Art	200 x 215	W.1804
	Water Lilies	1914–1917	Private collection	160 x 180	W.1805
	Water Lilies	1914–1917	Private collection	150 x 165	W.1806
	Water Lilies	1914–1917	National Gallery of Australia, Canberra	180 x 200	W.1807
	Water Lilies	1914–1917	Private collection	180 x 200	W.1808
	Water Lilies	1914–1917	Private collection	135 x 145	W.1809
	Water Lilies	1914–1919	Private collection	120 x 200	W.1810
	Water Lilies	1914–1919	Musée Marmottan Monet, Paris	200 x 200	W.1811
	Water Lilies	1914–1917	Chichu Art Museum, Naoshima	135 x 145	W.1812
	Water Lilies	1914–1917	Museum of Modern Art, New York	180 x 200	W.1813 (lost in fire)
	Water Lilies	1914–1917	Beyeler Foundation, Basel	150 x 200	W.1814
	Water Lilies	1914–1917	Wallraf-Richartz Museum, Cologne	180 x 200	W.1815
	Water Lilies	1914–1919	Musée Marmottan Monet, Paris	180 x 200	W.1816
	Water-Lilies, Cluster of Grass	1914–1917	Chichu Art Museum, Naoshima	200 x 213	W.1817
	Water-Lilies	1916–1919	Musée Marmottan Monet, Paris	150 x 197	W.1852
	Blue Water-Lilies	1916–1919	Musée d'Orsay, Paris	200 x 200	W.1853
	Water-Lilies	1916–1919	Beyeler Foundation, Basel	200 x 180	W.1854
	Water-Lilies, Reflection of a Weeping Willow	1916–1919	Musée Marmottan Monet, Paris	130 x 88	W.1855
	Water-Lilies	1916–1919	Private collection	130 x 200	W.1856
	Water-Lilies, Reflection of a Weeping Willow	1916–1919	Chichu Art Museum, Naoshima	100 x 200	W.1857
	Water-Lilies, Reflections of a Weeping Willow	1916–1919	Metropolitan Museum of Art, New York	130 x 200	W.1858
	Water-Lilies, Reflection of a Weeping Willow	1916–1919	Musée Marmottan Monet, Paris	200 x 200	W.1859
	Water-Lilies, Reflection of a Weeping Willow	1916–1919	Metropolitan Museum of Art, New York	130 x 200	W.1860
	Water-Lilies, Reflection of a Weeping Willow	1916–1919	Municipal Museum of Art, Kitakyushu	130 x 197	W.1861
	Water-Lilies, Reflection of a Weeping Willow	1916–1919	Musée Marmottan Monet, Paris	200 x 200	W.1862
	Water-Lilies	1916–1919	McNay Art Museum, San Antonio	130 x 200	W.1863
	Water-Lilies	1916–1919	Musée Marmottan Monet, Paris	130 x 152	W.1864
	Water-Lilies	1916–1919	Private collection	89 x 130	W.1865
	Vue du bassin aux nymphéas avec saule	1916–1919	Private Collection	140 x 150	W.1866
	Jardin d'eau à Giverny	1920	Museum of Grenoble	117 x 83	W.1878
	The Water-Lily Pond	1918–1919	Musée d'Art et d'Histoire (Geneva), Geneva	120 x 89	W.1879
	The Water-Lily Pond	1918–1919	Private collection	130 x 88	W.1880
	The Water-Lily Pond	1918-1919	Private collection	129 x 89	W.1881
	The Water-Lily Pond	1918–1919	Musée Marmottan Monet, Paris	73 x 105	W.1882
	The Water-Lily Pond	1918–1919	Museum Folkwang, Essen	130 x 200	W.1883
	The Water-Lily Pond	1917–1919	MOA Museum of Art, Atami	130 x 200	W.1884
	The Water-Lily Pond	1917–1919	Private collection	130 x 200	W.1885
	The Water-Lily Pond	1917–1919	Musée d'Arts de Nantes	100 x 200	W.1886
	The Water-Lily Pond	1917–1919	Private collection	100 x 200	W.1887
	The Water-Lily Pond	1917–1919	Musée Marmottan Monet, Paris	130 x 120	W.1888/1
	The Water-Lily Pond	1917–1919	Current whereabouts unknown	130 x 80	W.1888/2
	Water Lily Pond	1917–1926	Art Institute of Chicago	130.2 × 201.9	W.1889
	The Water Lily Pond	1917–1919	Private collection	100 x 200	W.1890
	The Water-Lily Pond (left panel)	1917–1919	Metropolitan Museum of Art, New York	101 x 200	W.1891
	The Water-Lily Pond (right panel)	1917–1919	Private collection	100 x 200	W.1892
	The Water Lily Pond (half of original)	1917–1919	Private collection	100 x 92	W.1893-1
	The Water Lily Pond (half of original)	1917–1919	Private Collection	101 x 104	W.1893-2
	Water Lilies	1917–1919	Private collection	100 x 200	W.1894
	Water Lilies	1917–1919	Honolulu Museum of Art	100 x 200	W.1895
	The Water-Lily Pond	1917–1919	Chichu Art Museum, Naoshima	100 x 200	W.1896
	The Water-Lily Pond	1917–1919	Private collection	100 x 200	W.1897
	Water-Lily Pond	1917-1919	Private collection	100 x 200	W.1898
	Water-Lily Pond	1917–1919	Albertina, Vienna	100 x 200	W.1899
	The Water-Lily Pond	1917–1920	National Museum of Modern and Contemporary Art, Seoul	100 x 200	W.1900
	The Water-Lily Pond (left side)	1917–1920	Location Unknown	100 x 70	W.1901/1
	The Water-Lily Pond (right side)	1917–1920	Private Collection	97 x 130	W.1901/2
	The Water-Lily Pond	1917–1920	Private collection	46 x 56	W.1901a
	The Water-Lily Pond	1917–1920	Private collection	86 x 90	W.1901b
	Water Lilies	1919–1920	Musée Marmottan Monet, Paris	100 x 300	W.1902
	Water-Lily Pond, Evening (left panel)	1920–1926	Kunsthaus Zurich	200 x 300	W.1964
	Water-Lily Pond, Evening (right panel)	1920–1926	Kunsthaus Zurich	200 x 300	W.1965
	Water-Lily Pond (left half)	1920–1926	Chichu Art Museum, Naoshima	200 x 150	W.1966
	Water-Lily Pond (right half)	1920–1926	Chichu Art Museum, Naoshima	200 x 150	W.1967
	Water-Lily Pond (triptych, left panel)	1920–1926	Beyeler Foundation, Basel	200 x 300	W.1968
	Water-Lily Pond (triptych, center panel)	1920–1926	Beyeler Foundation, Basel	200 x 300	W.1969
	Water-Lily Pond (triptych, right panel)	1920–1926	Beyeler Foundation, Basel	200 x 300	W.1970
	Reflections of the Weeping Willow on the Water-Lily Pond	1920-26	Withdrawn by the artist	200 x 425	W.1971
	Reflections of Clouds on the Water-Lily Pond (triptych, left panel)	1920–1926	Museum of Modern Art, New York	200 x 424	W.1972
	Reflections of Clouds on the Water-Lily Pond (triptych, center panel)	1920–1926	Museum of Modern Art, New York	200 x 424	W.1973
	Reflections of Clouds on the Water-Lily Pond (triptych, right panel)	1920–1926	Museum of Modern Art, New York	200 x 424	W.1974
	Water Lilies, Agapanthus (left panel)	1920–1926	Cleveland Museum of Art	200 x 425	W.1975
	Water Lilies, Agapanthus (center panel)	1920–1926	Saint Louis Art Museum	200 x 425	W.1976
	Water Lilies, Agapanthus (right panel)	1920–1926	Nelson-Atkins Museum of Art, Kansas City	200 x 425	W.1977
	Water-Lilies	1920–1926	National Gallery, London	200 x 427	W.1978
	The Water-Lily Pond, Green Reflections	1920–1926	Kunsthaus Zurich	200 x 425	W.1979
	Water-Lily Pond with Irises	1920–1926	Kunsthaus Zurich	200 x 600	W.1980
	Water Lilies	1920–1926	Museum of Modern Art, New York	200 x 600	W.1981
	Water-Lily Pond	1920–1926	Museum of Modern Art, New York	200 x 602 (lost in fire)	W.1982
	Water-Lily Pond	1920–1926	Carnegie Museums of Pittsburgh	200 x 600	W.1983
	Sunset	1914–1926	Musée de l'Orangerie, Paris	200 x 600	First room: 1
	The Clouds	1914–1926	Musée de l'Orangerie, Paris	200 x 1275	First room: 2a-c
	Green Reflections	1914–1926	Musée de l'Orangerie, Paris	200 x 850	First room: 3a-b
	Morning	1914–1926	Musée de l'Orangerie, Paris	200 x 1275	First room: 4a-d
	Tree Reflections	1914–1926	Musée de l'Orangerie, Paris	200 x 850	Second room: 1a-b
	Morning with Willows	1914–1926	Musée de l'Orangerie, Paris	200 x 1275	Second room 2a-c
	The Two Willows	1914–1926	Musée de l'Orangerie, Paris	200 x 1700	Second room: 3a-d
	Clear Morning with Willows	1914–1926	Musée de l'Orangerie, Paris	200 x 1275	Second room: 4a-c

== See also ==
- List of paintings by Claude Monet
- Weeping Willow, 1918 Monet painting, one of several works depicting a Weeping Willow tree located at the edge of his Water Lilies pond
- Show Me the Monet, 2005 painting by Banksy
- Monet Lake at Pool Bridge Farm
