= Crockey Hill =

Village in North Yorkshire, England

Coordinates: 53.911758°N 1.050091°W

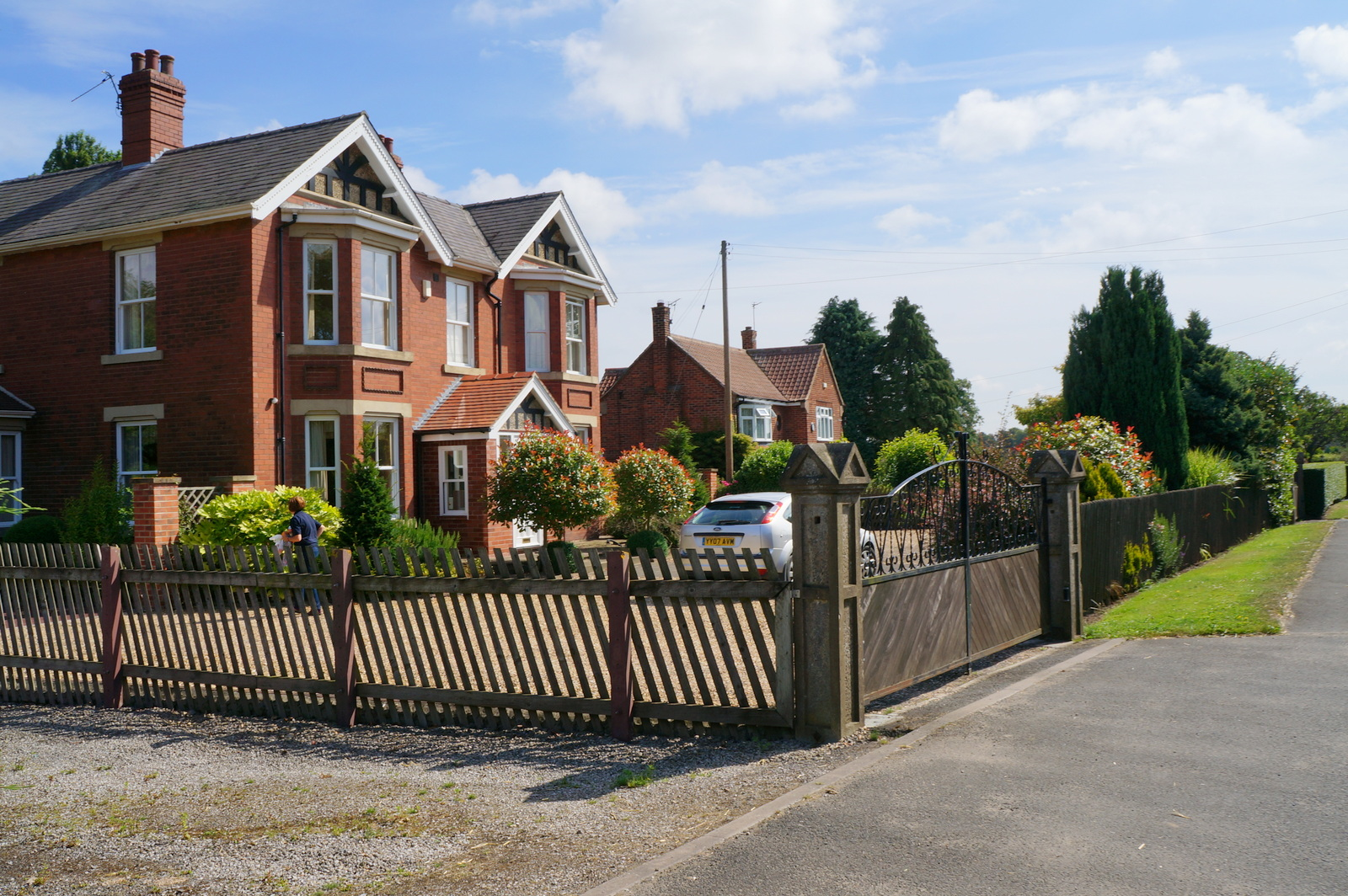
- Houses in Crockey Hill

- Location within North Yorkshire
- OS grid reference: SE624467
- Unitary authority: City of York
- Ceremonial county: North Yorkshire
- Region: Yorkshire and the Humber
- Country: England
- Sovereign state: United Kingdom
- Post town: YORK
- Postcode district: YO19
- Police: North Yorkshire
- Fire: North Yorkshire
- Ambulance: Yorkshire
- UK Parliament: York Outer

Crockey Hill is a small village in the unitary authority of City of York in North Yorkshire, England. It is situated on the A19 2.5 miles (4 km) south of York.

The village is in the Wheldrake ward of the City of York.

The name of the hamlet derives from 'Cockermire', mentioned in 1619; a 'great stone' in the road, near the parish boundary, was then said to mark the site of the former Cockermire cross.

Businesses located at Crockey Hill include a car dealership, a veterinary surgery, a transport cafe and a fruit and vegetable stall. The York Designer Outlet is also nearby, situated at the intersection of the A19 and the A64, approximately 1 mile north of the village. The outdoor swimming venue Pool Bridge Farm is also located in the village.

The A19 at Crockey Hill was a notorious blackspot with many people becoming injured or losing their lives in road traffic accidents. This led to traffic lights being installed at the junction linking the A19 to Wheldrake Lane in 2007. The traffic lights have not proved entirely effective.
