= Nymphéas en fleur =

Painting by Claude Monet

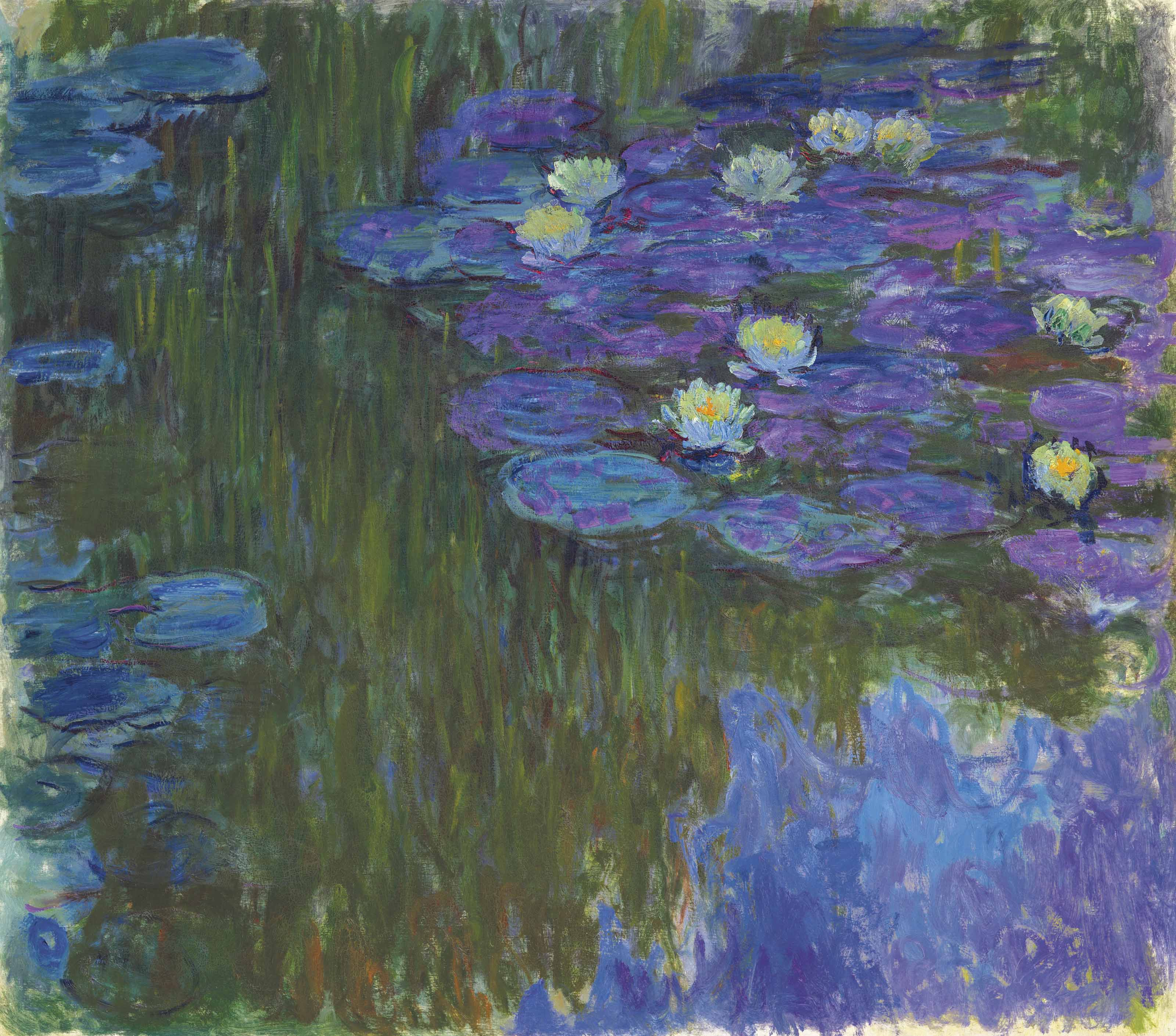
- Artist: Claude Monet
- Year: c. 1914–1917
- Type: Oil paint on canvas
- Dimensions: 63 by 70.875 inches (160.02 cm × 180.02 cm)
- Location: Private collection

Nymphéas en fleur is a painting by French artist Claude Monet from his Water Lilies series. In a 2018 auction of paintings in the private collection of David Rockefeller and his wife, it was sold to another private collector for $81.7 million dollars. This was then the highest amount paid for a work by Monet.

== See also ==
- List of paintings by Claude Monet
