= Chichu Art Museum =

Japanese art museum

Coordinates: 34°26′59.13″N 133°59′08.89″E

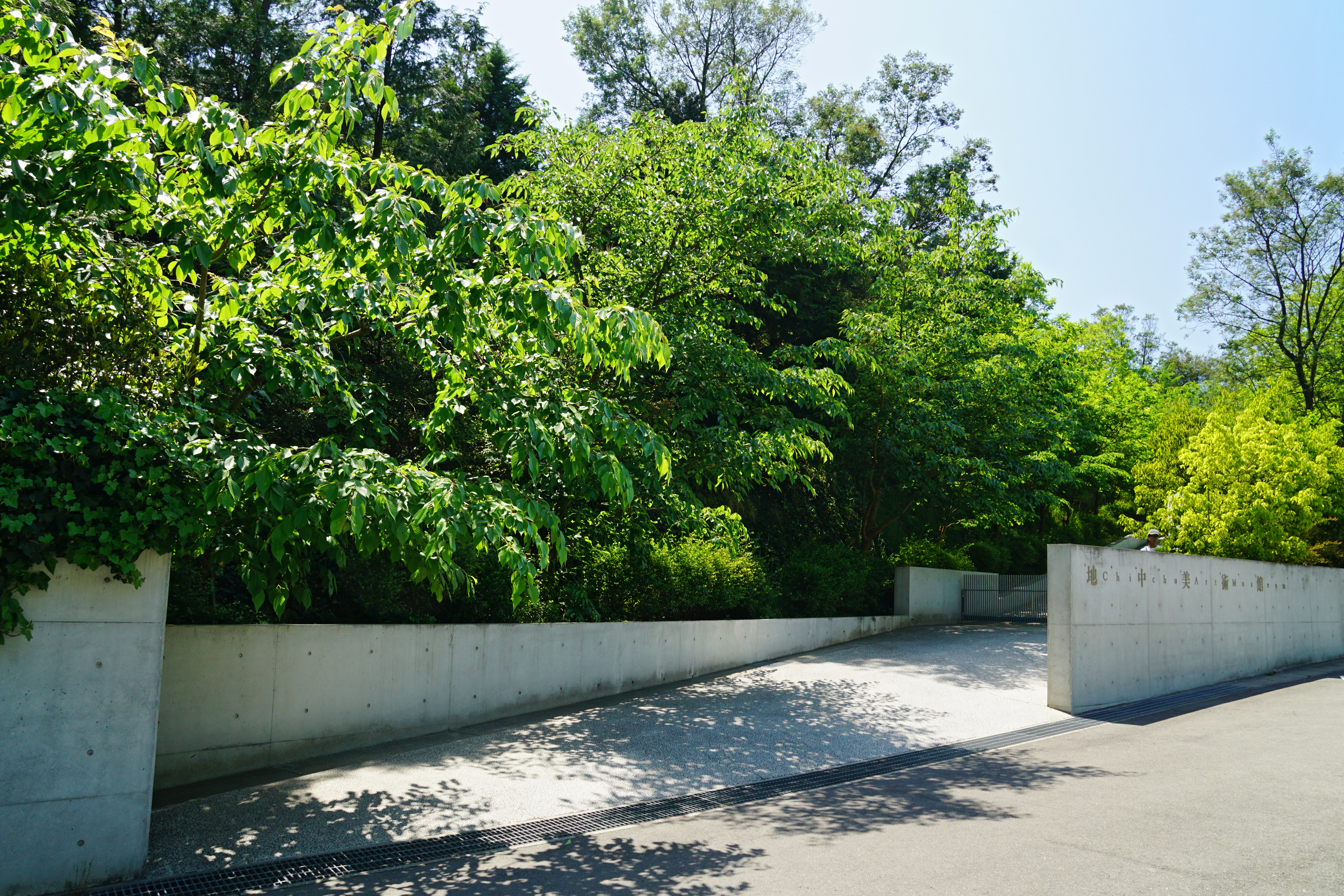
- Established: July 18, 2004
- Location: Naoshima, Kagawa, Japan
- Director: Soichiro Fukutake
- Website: benesse-artsite.jp/en/art/chichu.html

The Chichu Art Museum (地中美術館, Chichū Bijutsukan) (literally 'art museum in the earth') is a museum built directly into a southern portion of the island of Naoshima in Kagawa Prefecture, Japan. It was designed by architect Tadao Ando and opened to the public on July 18, 2004.

== Background ==
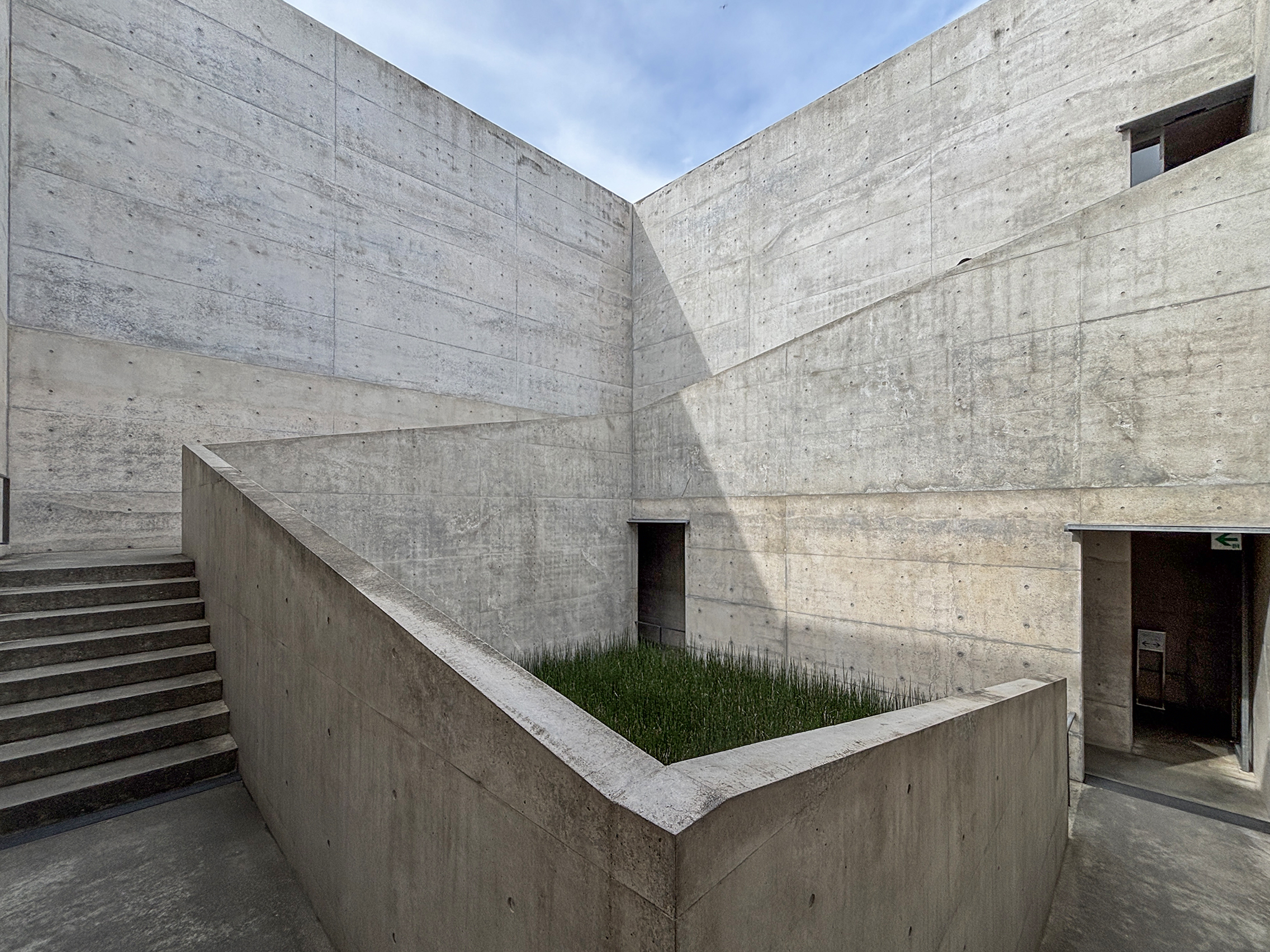
Space of Fear Courtyard

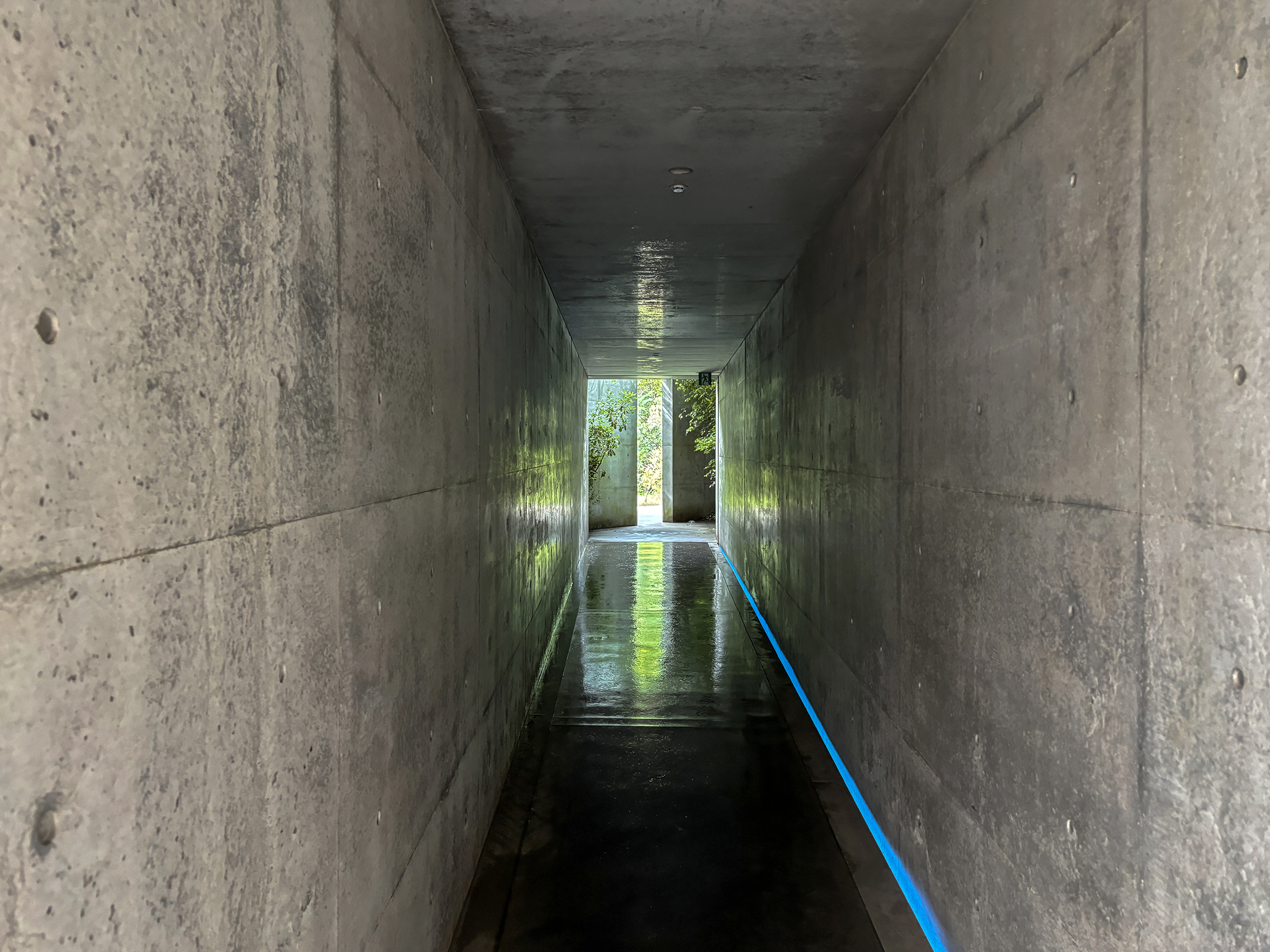
Space of Fear access

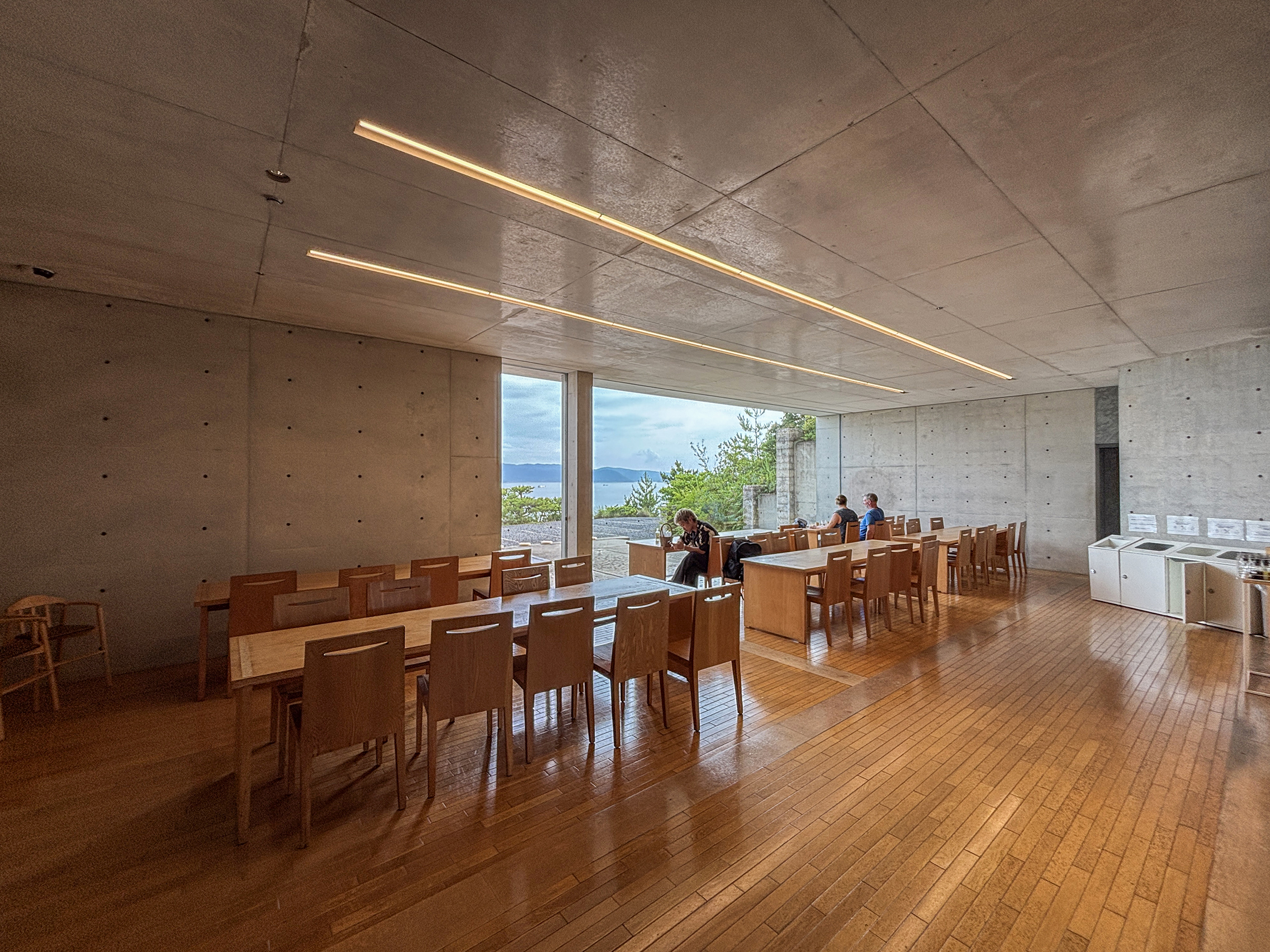
Cafe

The subterranean museum is under the administration of the Fukutake Foundation, a project of the Benesse Corporation whose president Soichiro Fukutake also acts as director of the facility. It exists as part of an ongoing initiative to "rethink the relationship between nature and people," and is one of several arts-related sites generating tourist interest in the area.

Despite its position buried underground, the design of the building is such that it facilitates the exclusive use of natural light to illuminate a number of the exhibits, changing their appearance at different viewing times throughout the day and, in essence, encompassing the building itself within the same realm as the art on display.

== Exhibited works ==
The site features permanent installations by Walter De Maria and James Turrell, as well as painted works in the Water Lilies series by Claude Monet.

=== Walter De Maria ===
- "Time/Timeless/No Time," 2004 – granite, mahogany, gold leaf, concrete

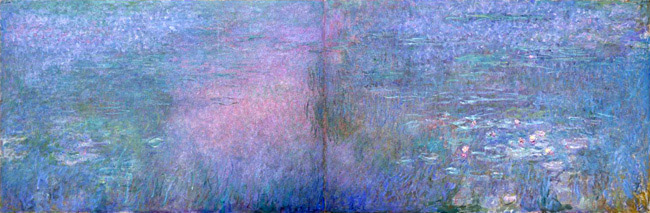
Claude Monet's Water-Lily Pond c. 1915-1926

=== Claude Monet ===
- "Water Lilies," 1914–1917 – oil on canvas, 200×200 cm
- "Water Lilies, Reflections of Weeping Willows," 1916–1919 – oil on canvas, 100×200 cm
- "Water-Lily Pond," 1917–1919 – oil on canvas, 100×200 cm
- "Water-Lily Pond," c.1915–1926 – oil on canvas, diptych, each part: 200×300 cm

=== James Turrell ===
- "Afrum, Pale Blue," 1968 – projector
- "Open Field," 2000 – fluorescent light, neon tube
- "Open Sky," 2004 – LED, xenon lamp

== Chichu Garden ==
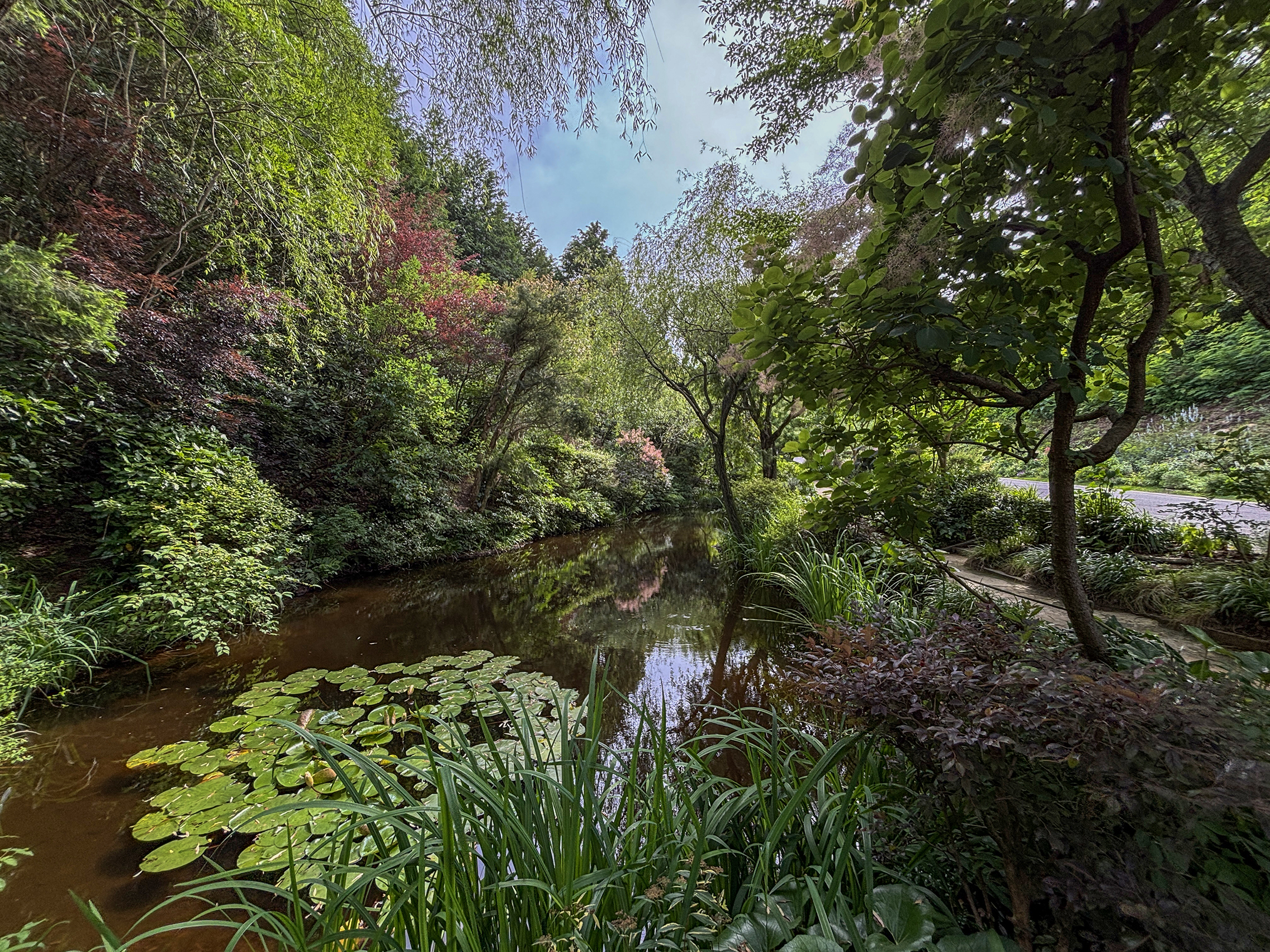
Chichu Garden

Located between the ticket center and main museum building, the Chichu Garden is an area roughly 400 m^{2} in size that features approximately 150 types of plants, 40 kinds of trees and almost 200 kinds of flowers that either appeared in Monet's works or were collected by the artist during his lifetime. As Monet was an avid gardener, his own designs as well as inspiration gleaned directly from some of his most famous paintings were used to design the garden and ponds that make up the area, which even feature some of the same water lilies that appear in his famous series.

The rationale behind Chichu Garden is one where, through physical experience, it is believed one's understanding and appreciation of Claude Monet's work can be deepened.

== See also ==
- Inujima Art Project
- Teshima Art Museum
