= Pool Bridge Farm =

Outdoor swimming venue

Coordinates: 53.9096°N 1.0251°W

- Pool Bridge Farm logo

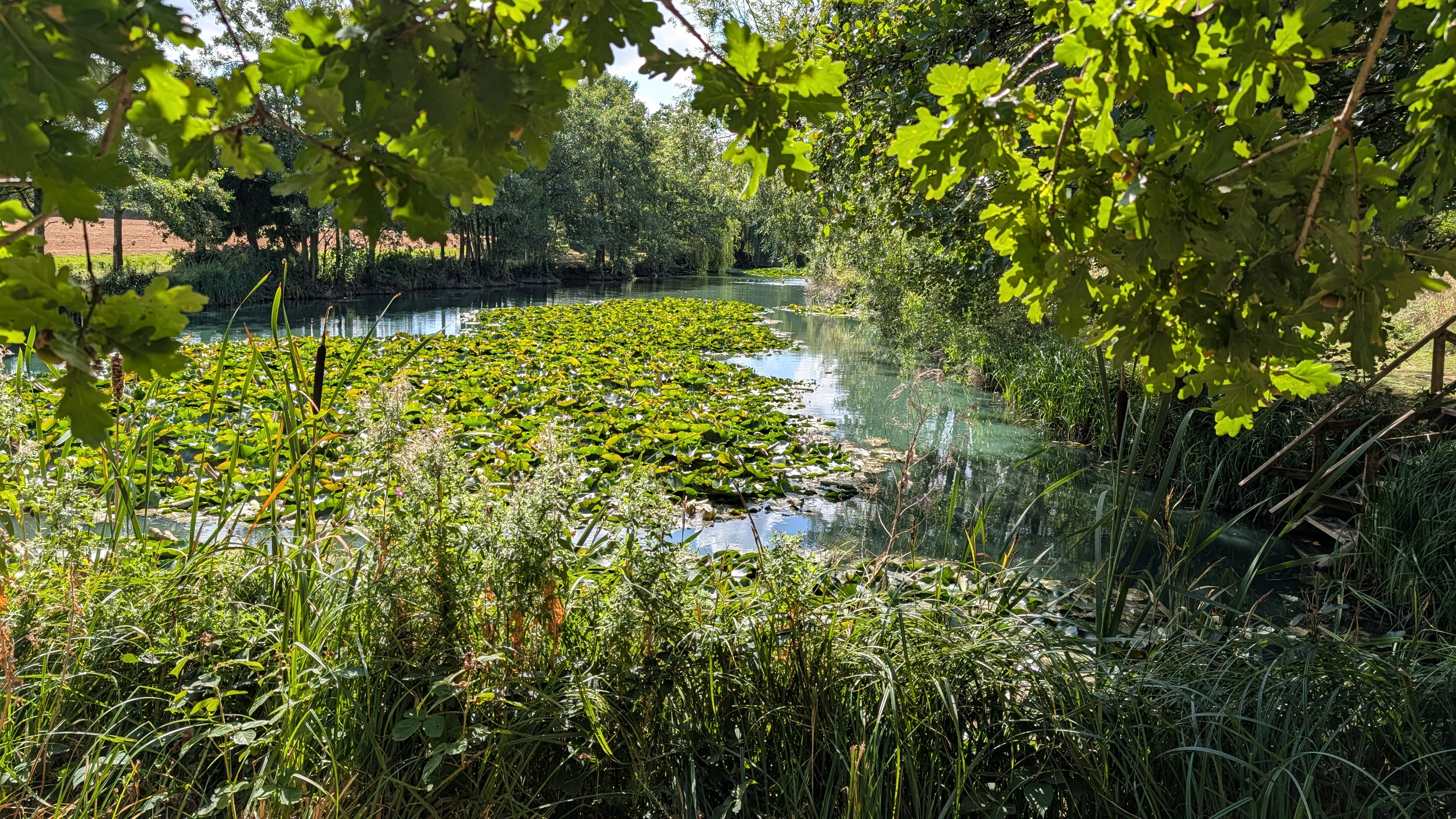
- Monet lake (July 2025)
- Interactive map of Pool Bridge Farm
- Address: York
- Location: Crockey Hill
- Owner: Mike Fletcher

Pool Bridge Farm is a farm and open water swimming venue in Crockey Hill, York, UK. The farm is owned by Mike Fletcher and family. The farm opened its lakes for outdoor swimming in 2022. Prior to this, all lakes were used for coarse fishing, with an emphasis on carp and catfish at Q lake. In 2018 the site hosted a fund raising event to support people with Motor Neurone Disease.

In 2024 it was named by The Guardian as one of the UK's top ten pop up sauna locations. The same year it was named by The Telegraph as one of the best places for a festive dip. One of the lakes is called Monet, named after a series of paintings entitled Water Lilies, due to the fact that those flowers grow in it. Another lake is called M lake; the site also has saunas for use alongside outdoor swimming. The farm also hosts full moon swims, and has a campsite. It was a partner on a 2023 project led by York St John University that explored disabled access to blue spaces.

== Gallery ==
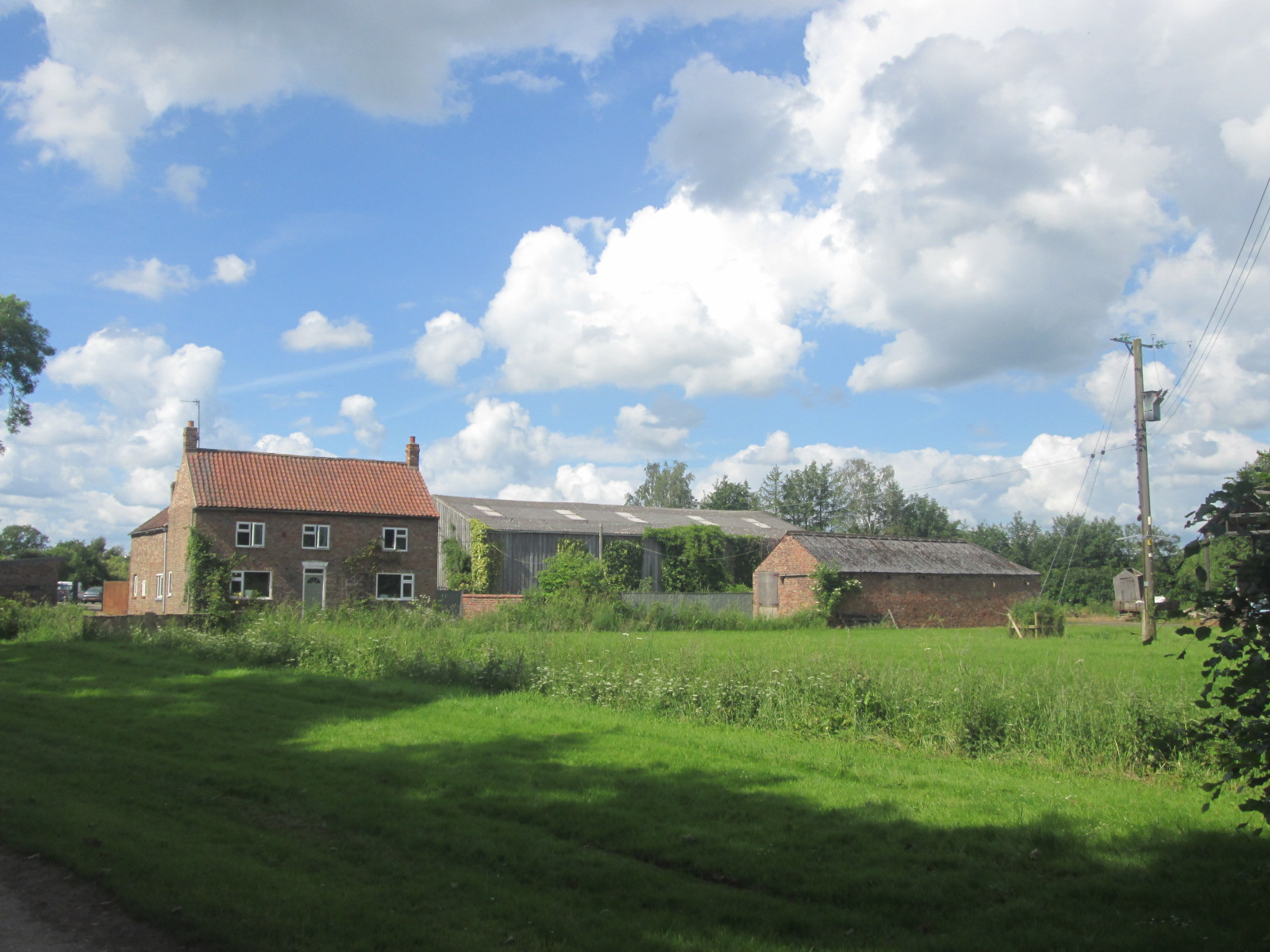
Pool Bridge Farm (June 2014)

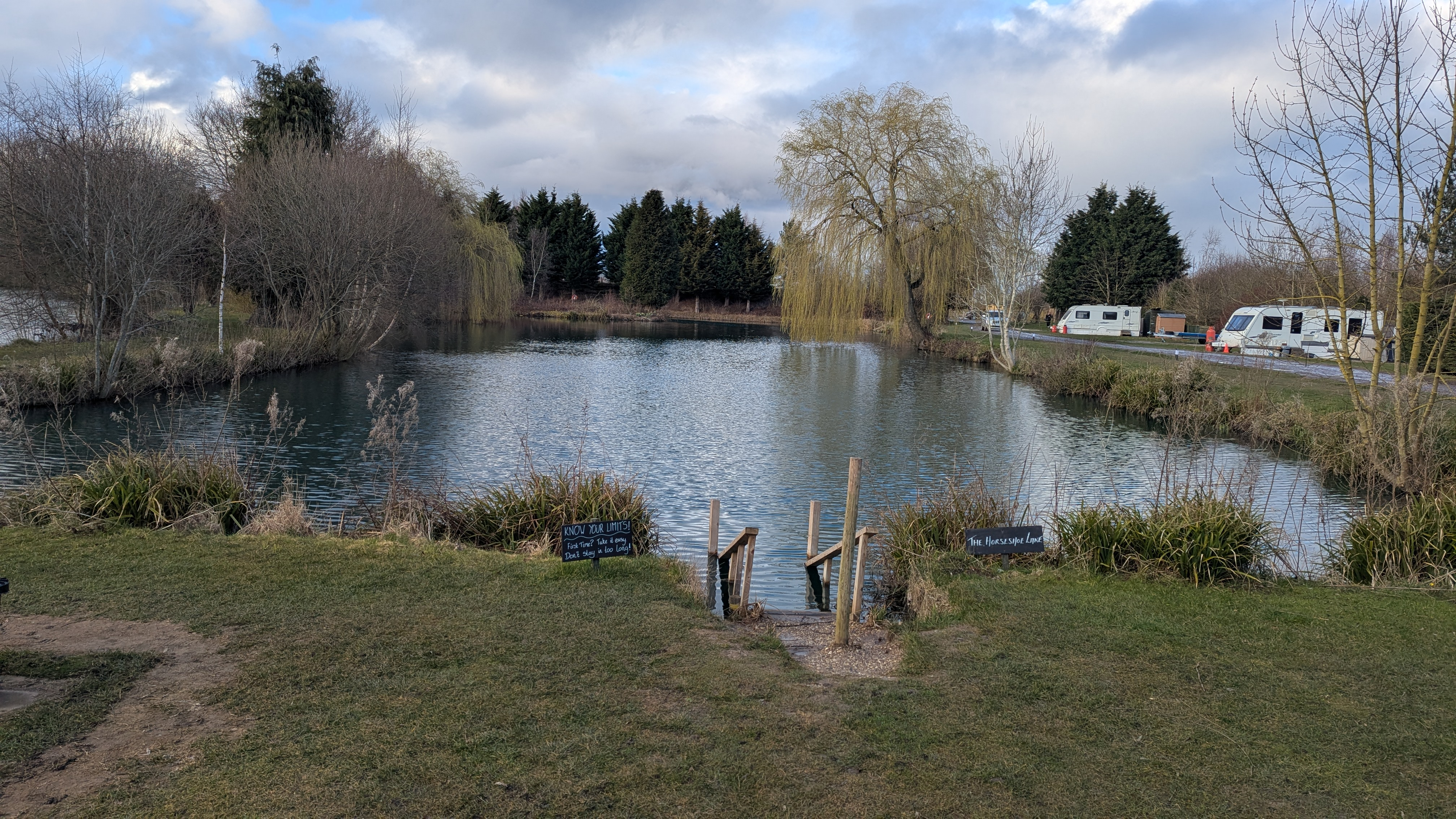
Horseshoe lake (March 2025)

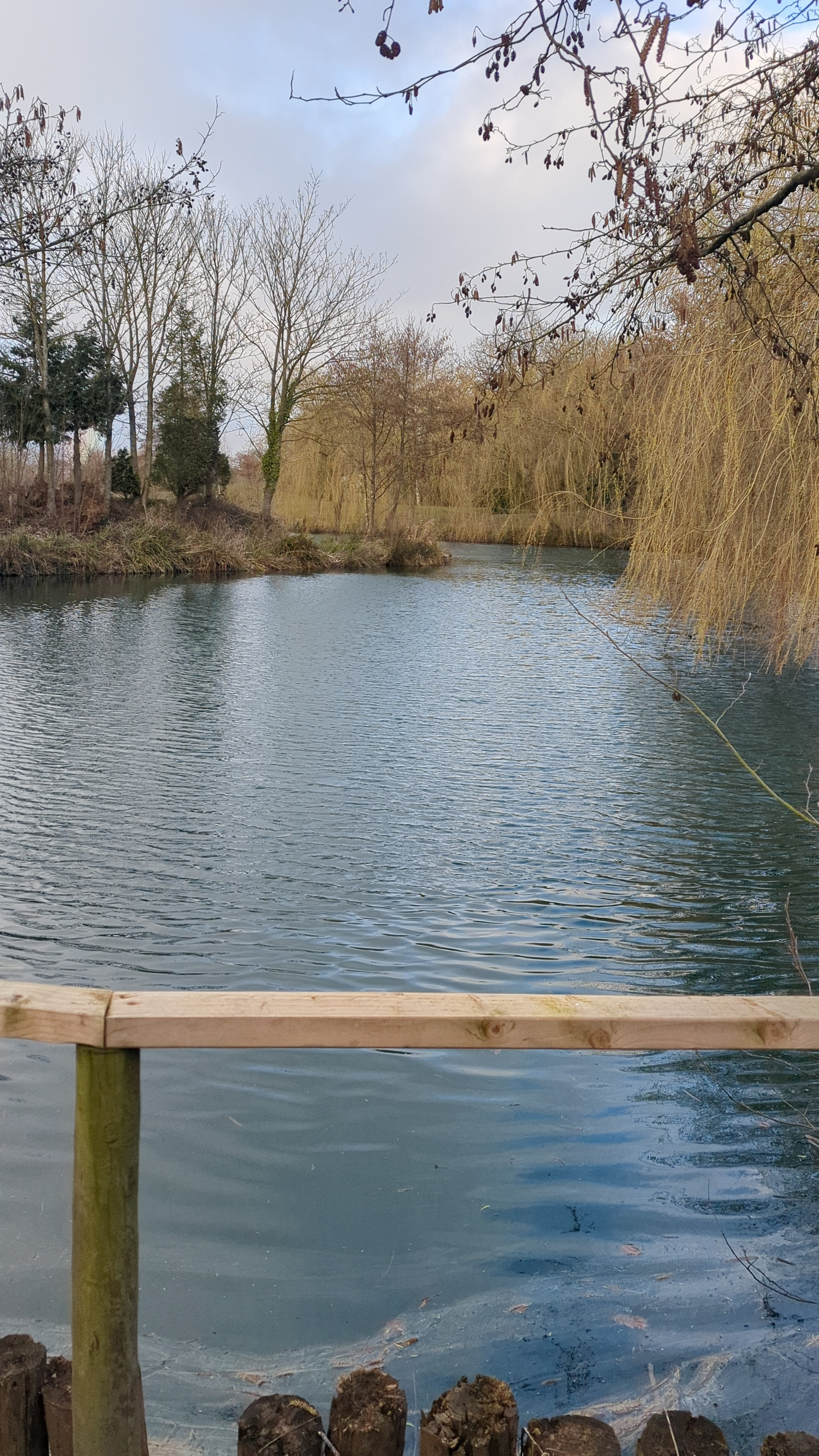
M lake (March 2025)

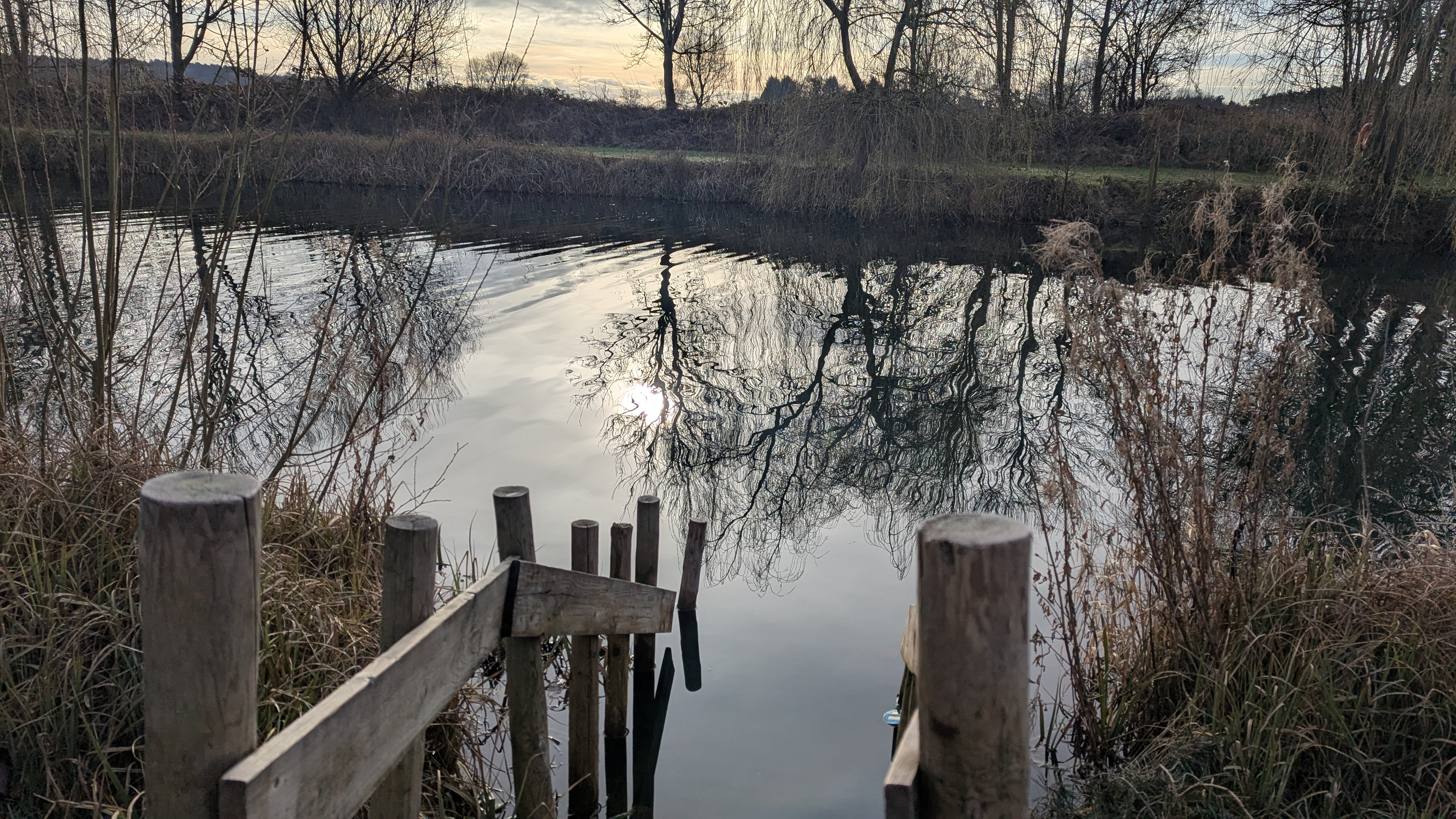
Monet lake (March 2025)

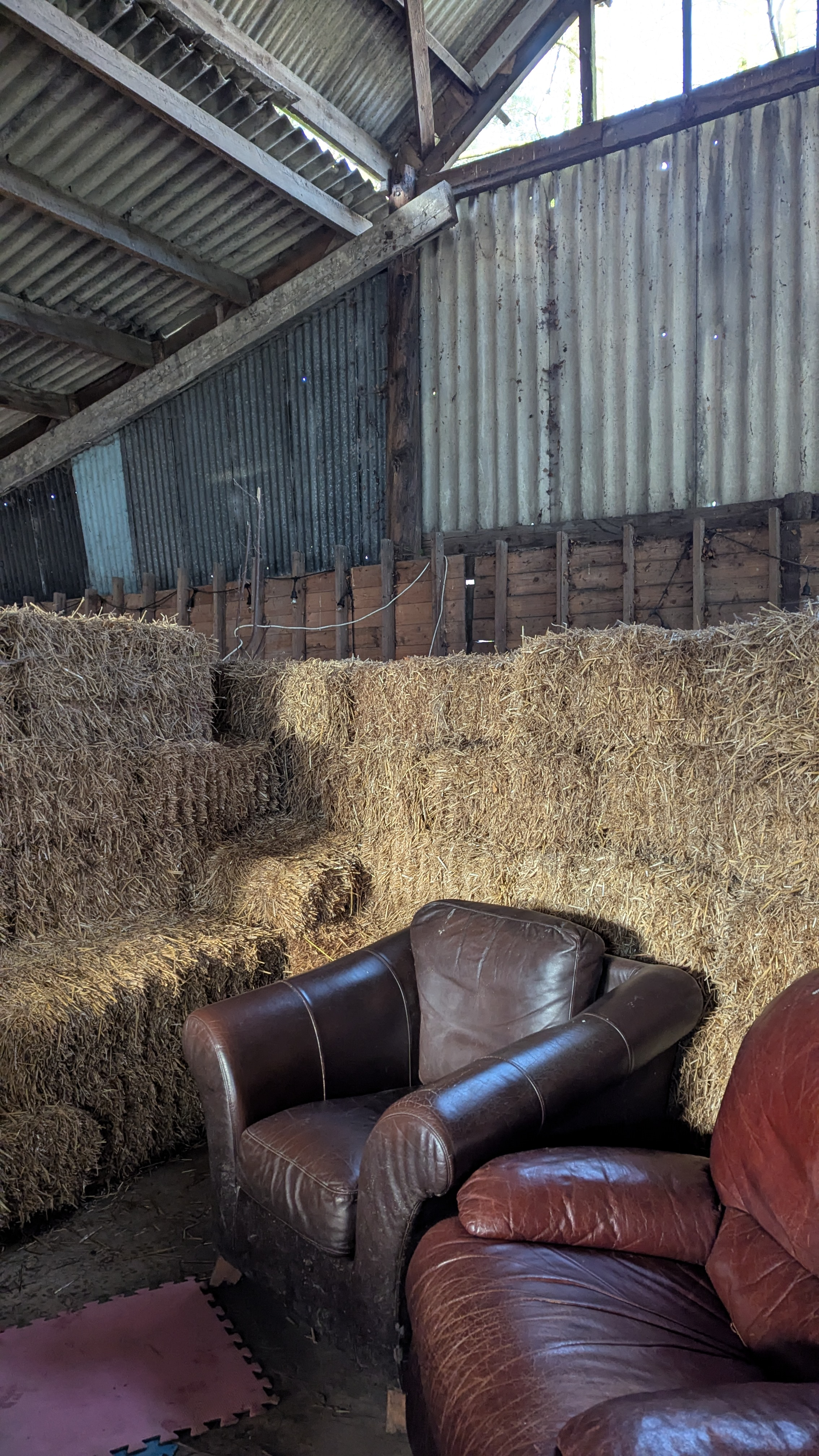
Inside changing barn (March 2025)

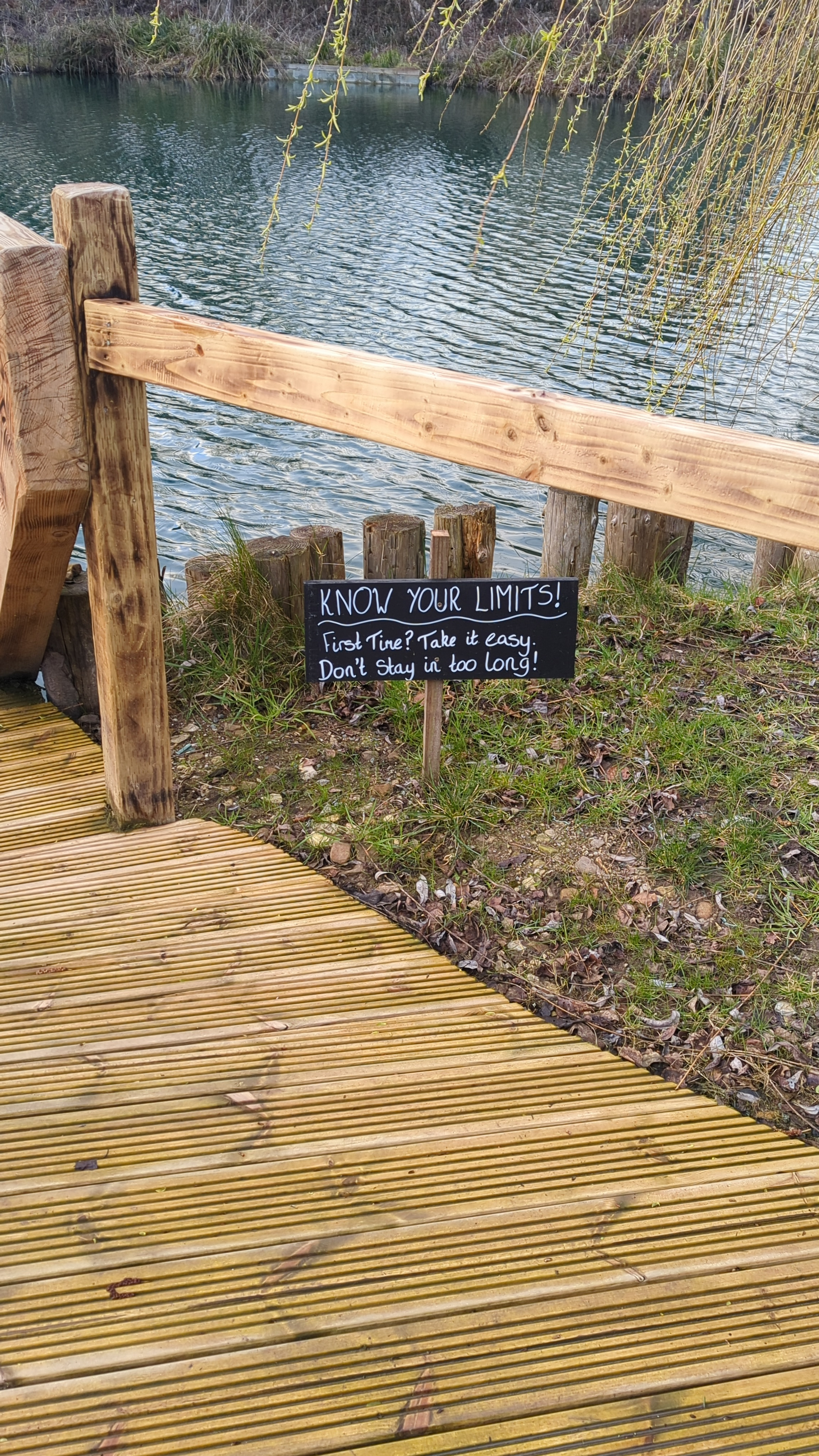
Cold water safety sign, M lake (March 2025)
