= Listed buildings in Ripon =

Ripon is a civil parish in the county of North Yorkshire, England. It contains over 280 listed buildings that are recorded in the National Heritage List for England. Of these, three are listed at Grade I, the highest of the three grades, 13 are at Grade II*, the middle grade, and the others are at Grade II, the lowest grade. The parish contains the cathedral city of Ripon and the surrounding area. The most important listed buildings are Ripon Cathedral, the Chapel of St Mary Magdalen, and Ripon Obelisk in Market Place, all listed at Grade I. Most of the other listed buildings are houses, cottages and associated structures, shops, banks and offices, restaurants and cafés, hotels and public houses. The others include churches and chapels, bridges, almshouses, farmhouses and farm buildings, a drinking fountain and a wellhead, a milepost, schools, a warehouse, museums, part of a hospital, a bandstand, a statue and a war memorial in the Spa Gardens, a lamp, a clock tower, swimming baths, a cabman's shelter, and a group of telephone kiosks.

== Key ==
Grade	Criteria
I	Buildings of exceptional interest, sometimes considered to be internationally important
II*	Particularly important buildings of more than special interest
II	Buildings of national importance and special interest

== Buildings ==
Name and location	Photograph	Date	Notes	Grade
Ripon Cathedral; 54.13503°N 1.52054°W		Anglo-Saxon	The cathedral has a long and complicated history, the oldest part being the crypt, it has been altered and extended through the centuries, and became a cathedral in 1836. During he 19th century there were three restorations, the major one by George Gilbert Scott in 1862. It is built in stone, and consists of a nave with a clerestory and two west towers, north and south aisles, north and south transepts, the main tower at the crossing, and a choir with aisles, a clerestory, a south chapter house and a south vestry.	I
Chapel of St Mary Magdalen; 54.14090°N 1.51587°W		12th century	The chapel has been altered and restored through the centuries. It is built in limestone with a low-pitched roof, and dates mainly from the 15th century. At the west end is a large buttress with a bellcote above. The south doorway is Norman, and has zigzag decoration. The east window has four lights and is in Perpendicular style, and on the east gable is a finial.	I
North Bridge; 54.14370°N 1.51537°W		Medieval	The bridge, which has been rebuilt and widened through the centuries, carries North Road (A6108 road) over the River Ure. It is in stone with seven arches over the river, some pointed and some circular. The bridge has a parapet, and at the south end is a causeway. There are projecting stone gutters draining the roadway.	II
Remains of St Anne's Hospital; 54.13398°N 1.52000°W		14th century	The remains consist of the ruined chapel of the hospital. It is in limestone and roofless, with a chancel arch at the west end and a two-light Decorated window at the west end. Inside, there is a stone altar slab, a piscina and a stoup.	II*
The Old Courthouse; 54.13540°N 1.52133°W		14th century (possible)	The building is in stone and has sprocketed pantile roofs. There are two storeys, three bays, and a south extension with a timber framed upper floor. The building contains a blocked round-arched doorway, and an arched doorway on the upper floor approached by external steps with an iron balustrade. The windows are a mix of sashes, casements and one slit window.	II
27 Kirkgate; 54.13522°N 1.52190°W		Mid-15th century	Originally a gatehouse, later two houses, and subsequently used for other purposes, the building has a timber framed core, and is stuccoed on the exterior. There are two storeys, the left part has one bay, and contains a mid-19ath century shopfront with panelled pilasters, roundels and a cornice, and above is a horizontally sliding sash window. The right part has two narrow bays, the right bay with a carriage entrance and a small window above. On the left bay are sash windows, the upper one horizontally sliding.	II
Wall in front of The Old Deanery; 54.13534°N 1.51971°W		Late 15th or early 16th century	The wall, which runs along the north side of Minster Road, is in limestone, on a moulded chamfered plinth, with moulded coping. It contains a pair of gate piers with moulded cornices, a gateway with a moulded surround and a segmental cusped head, and a door with ogee panelling.	II
Abbot Huby's Wall; 54.13601°N 1.51865°W		c. 1505	The wall that encloses Deanery Close is partly in stone and partly in pebble, partly in limestone and partly in sandstone. It has a deeply moulded plinth, and contains an arched gateway with a chamfered surround.	II
19 Kirkgate; 54.13505°N 1.52155°W		16th century	The shop was enlarged in 1760 and refronted in the 19th century, It is in brown brick with paired gutter brackets and a pantile roof. There are three storeys and two bays. On the ground floor is a mid-19th-century shopfront with panelled Tuscan pilasters, an oblong fanlight and an entablature. On the upper floors are sash windows with channelled stucco voussoirs. Inside, there is an inglenook.	II
Thorpe Prebend House; 54.13385°N 1.52048°W		Mid-16th century (probable)	The earliest part of the house, later used as a museum, is the east wing, most of the rest of it dating from the 17th century. Part of the house has a timber framed core, later encased or replaced in brick and roughcast, and the house has roofs of pantile and stone slate with coped gables on cut kneelers. There are two storeys and attics, a main range of four bays, and flanking wings projecting to the south. The doorway is on the north front and has a Tuscan surround. The west wing has French windows, a two-storey canted bay window and dormers, and elsewhere are sash and casement windows.	II*
7, 8 and 9 Kirkgate; 54.13520°N 1.52230°W		Late 16th century	A row of three shops that were refronted in the mid-19th century. They are stuccoed, and have a wooden bracketed eaves cornice and a slate roof. There are two storeys and six bays. On the ground floor is a continuous shopfront with panelled pilasters, eclectic capitals, a frieze and a modillion cornice, mullions with spiral fluting at the bottom, and foliate capitals taking segmental arches with highly ornamental lintels. There are three doors in recessed porches. The upper floor contains sash windows in moulded frames with segmental pediments.	II
81 and 82 Bondgate; 54.13217°N 1.52088°W		16th or 17th century (probable)	A pair of houses in brick, the right house with a timber framed core, and a pantile roof with stone slate verges. There are two storeys and three bays. On the ground floor are two shopfronts flanking a segmental-arched doorway. The upper floor contains two sash windows on the left, and a horizontal sliding sash window on the right.	II
The Wakeman's House; 54.13605°N 1.52441°W		16th or 17th century	The remaining parlour wing of a hall and cross-wing house, later used for other purposes. It is timber framed with a stone slate roof. There are two storeys and attics, and a front of two bays under a gable. In the centre is a doorway, this is flanked on the ground floor and on the upper floor by canted oriel windows, on the upper floor with a hipped roof. In the attic is a casement window.	II*
10 and 11 Kirkgate; 54.13519°N 1.52214°W		17th century	A pair of shops with a timber framed core that were later refronted. The front is in colourwashed brick, and it has a hipped pantile roof. There are three storeys and three bays. The ground floor contains two early 19th-century shopfronts, the left with moulded pilasters, the right with a segmental bow window and panelled pilasters. To the right of these is a doorway approached by steps, and a round-arched passage entry. On the upper floors are sash windows, those on the top floor horizontally sliding, and the middle window blind.	II
12 and 13 Kirkgate; 54.13516°N 1.52202°W		17th century (or earlier)	A pair of shops with a timber framed core that were refronted in the early 19th century. They are in colourwashed brick, and have three storeys and two bays. On the ground floor are two mid-19th-century shopfronts with panels to the sill level, panelled pilasters, ornamental moulded consoles, a frieze and a modillion cornice. The upper floors contain sash windows.	II
15 Market Place; 54.13672°N 1.52308°W		17th century (or earlier)	The shop has a timber framed core, the front, which is stuccoed, dates from the mid-19th century, and has wooden angle pilasters, a floor band, a deep modillion and dentilled eaves cornice, and a slate roof. There are three storeys and one bay. Projecting on the ground floor is a late 19th-century shopfront, the middle floor contains a canted bay window with small Composite capitals and arched lights, and on the top floor is a sash window.	II
Building attached to 21 and 22 Market Place; 54.13678°N 1.52407°W		17th century	A house, later a shop, the ground floor in brick, and above in applied decorative timber framing and plaster. There are four storeys and two bays and a two-storey bay over a passage entry on the left. The ground floor contains a shopfront, on the first floor are oriel windows on wooden brackets, and above are casement windows.	II
23 and 24 Market Place; 54.13671°N 1.52408°W		17th century (or earlier)	A shop with a timber framed core, applied decorative timber framing to the exterior of the upper floors, and a stone slate roof. There are three storeys and attics, the top floor jettied, the gable end facing the street, and three bays. The ground floor contains a modern shopfront and a passage entry to the right. On the middle floor are sash windows in shallow canted oriel windows, and above are casement windows.	II
14, 15 and 16 Westgate; 54.13644°N 1.52605°W		17th century (probable)	The building is in two parts, the right part stuccoed with a timber framed core, and the left part dating from the mid-19th century. Both parts have mid-19th century shopfronts with Tuscan pilasters and a moulded cornice. The right part has two storeys and three bays, a pantile roof, and horizontally sliding sash windows. The left part has three storeys and one bay, a slate roof, and sash windows.	II
17, 18 and 19 Westgate; 54.13631°N 1.52602°W	—	17th century (probable)	A row of three houses, rendered at the front, in brown brick at the rear, with roofs of pantile, stone slate and tile. There are two storeys and four bays, the right two bays gabled. On the front are four doorways, three with oblong fanlights, and sash windows, most horizontally sliding, and some tripartite.	II
20 Westgate; 54.13625°N 1.52588°W	—	17th century (probable)	The building is in rendered brick with a slate roof. There are two storeys and two bays. On the ground floor is a shopfront with sunk panelled pilasters and a moulded cornice, and the upper floor has two sash windows with moulded surrounds.	II
Bondgate Hall; 54.13115°N 1.52056°W		17th century	The house is in roughcast stone with a pantile roof. There are two storeys, three bays, and a lower rear wing. The central doorway has pilasters, the windows on the front are casements, and in each gable end are mullioned windows.	II
The Black Bull Public House; 54.13750°N 1.52310°W		17th century	The public house is in two parts; the left part has a timber framed core and the front dates from the mid-19th century, and the right part dates from the early 19th century. The building is roughcast with pantile roofs, the right higher, and each part has two storeys and two bays. The left part contains two two-storey bay windows with moulded cornices, and above is a parapet. On the right part is a doorway with reeded pilaster, a semicircular fanlight and a cornice, to its left is a small round-headed window, above is a sash window with a wedge lintel and a keystone, and to the right is a two-storey bow window.	II
The Old Deanery; 54.13554°N 1.51989°W		Mid-17th century	A house that has been altered and later used as a hotel, it is in limestone with a hipped stone slate roof. There are two storeys and attics, and three bays, flanked by projecting gabled wings with chamfered coping on cut stone kneelers. The central doorway has a four-centred arch, a two-light fanlight and a hood mould. The windows are mullioned and transomed, and there is a small gabled dormer containing an achievement and an inscription. On the wings are two-storey canted bay windows with string courses and parapets.	II*
17, 17A and 18 Market Place; 54.13679°N 1.52341°W		Late 17th century	A shop and a café in whitewashed brick, with a projecting moulded eaves cornice, and a hipped and sprocketed roof in slate at the front and pantile at the rear. There are two storeys and attics, a front of five bays, and two rear wings. On the ground floor are mid-19th-century shopfronts, the upper floor contains two casement windows and four sash windows, and in the attic are two gabled dormers.	II
Bondgate House; 54.12983°N 1.51993°W		Late 17th century (or earlier)	The house is in roughcast brick on a limestone plinth, the rear wing has a timber framed core, the main body of the house has a pantile roof with ornamental bargeboards to the gables, and the rear wing has a hipped stone slate roof. There are two storeys, three bays, and a rear wing. The doorway has a Tuscan surround with panelled pilasters. The windows are a mix of casements, and sashes, some horizontally sliding, and on the returns are mullioned windows.	II
Deans Croft; 54.13675°N 1.51849°W		1686	The original building was a house, it was subsequently used as a police station, and later reverted to a private house. In 1816 a cell block was added, which has been converted into a museum. The house is rendered, and has a floor band and a stone slate roof. There are three storeys and a partial basement, and six bays, and the windows are mullioned. The former cell block is in brown brick with wooden brackets to the eaves, and has two storeys. On both floors are iron-barred windows.	II*
St Agnes House; 54.13412°N 1.51906°W		1693	The house is in roughcast brick and has a pantile roof. There are two storeys and attics, and five bays. The doorway has a heavily rusticated surround. There are five circular windows, each with four keystones, a bow window, and a horizontally sliding sash window. On the west end is a large projecting chimney breast with two segmental pediments. At the rear is a two-storey one-bay wing with a shaped gable.	II*
8 and 9 Westgate; 54.13632°N 1.52560°W		17th or 18th century	Shops with a timber framed core, walls in brick, and a pantile roof with stone slate verges to the rear. There are two storeys and three bays. On the ground floor are modern shopfronts, and the upper floor contains sash windows with segment heads.	II
Obelisk; 54.13635°N 1.52370°W		1702	The obelisk in Market Place was designed by Nicholas Hawksmoor, it is in stone, and is over 80 feet (24 m) in height. The obelisk has a plinth and a moulded base, on which is an inscribed plaque. It is surmounted by a tall wrought iron weathervane.	I
Garden walls, Minster House; 54.13429°N 1.52146°W	—	c. 1720–30	The garden walls extend from the west front of Ripon Cathedral to the garden of the Old Hall, High St Agnes Gate. They are in limestone with sandstone coping, and form two quadrants flanking a gateway. The gate piers are in rusticated sandstone, with moulded cornices and ball finials. Between them is a cast iron overthrow with a lamp, and immediately outside them are cast iron railings.	II
15 High Saint Agnesgate; 54.13407°N 1.51955°W		Early 18th century	The house is stuccoed and has a hipped slate roof. The entrance front has three storeys and two bays. On the right is a doorway with moulded pilasters, a semicircular fanlight and a moulded cornice, and the windows are sashes. The garden front has two storeys and three bays, and has a wooden porch with two Tuscan columns and an entablature. The doorway has fluted pilasters, a semicircular fanlight and a modillion cornice.	II
38 and 38A Kirkgate; 54.13560°N 1.52265°W	—	Early 18th century	A pair of buildings in brown brick with a slate roof. There are three storeys and four bays, the second bay projecting slightly. On the ground floor is a mid-19th-century shopfront with panelled dies and a moulded cornice on scrolled consoles, the windows with small capitals and moulded ornament in the spandrels. To its right is a window and a doorway under a moulded cornice, both with panelled pilasters and scrolled consoles, the doorway also with a semicircular fanlight. On the right on the middle floor is a canted wooden oriel window with angle pilasters, a moulded cornice and a fretwork valance, and the other windows are segment-headed sashes.	II
8 and 9 Market Place; 54.13642°N 1.52311°W	—	Early 18th century	A shop with a passage entry to the left, it is stuccoed and has quoins, sill bands, a moulded and modillion wooden eaves cornice and a slate roof. There are three storeys and three bays. On the ground floor is a modern shopfront, and the passage entry is flanked by columns. The upper floors contain sash windows with raised rusticated surrounds.	II
Gazebos, 7 and 8 Park Street; 54.13706°N 1.52789°W		Early 18th century	The gazebos in the garden are in red brick, with stone dressings, and pyramidal pantile roofs with ball finials. They consist of two-storey pavilions with plaster coves, stone bands and rusticated quoins, and a door on the upper storey. Between them is a two-storey gallery, the ground floor with four bays containing semicircular arches with rusticated jambs and voussoirs. The upper floor has a balustrade, and piers with ornamental carving. At the rear are four niches with rusticated surrounds.	II*
Minster House; 54.13456°N 1.52096°W		Early 18th century	The house is in red brick, with stone quoins, a floor band and a parapet. There are two storeys, a south front of seven bays, a west front of five bays, and two slightly projecting bays on the east front. In the centre of the south front is a doorway with a broken pediment containing a coat of arms. The windows are tall sashes with moulded sills and keystones.	II*
St Michaels House; 54.13406°N 1.51980°W	—	Early 18th century	The house is rendered, and has a slate roof with coped gables on moulded kneelers. There are two storeys and attics and four bays. The garden front contains sash windows and four flat-topped dormers. On the street front is a doorway with panelled reveals and reeded pilasters, and sash windows.	II
Former Saracens Head Public House; 54.13852°N 1.52391°W		Early 18th century (or earlier)	The public house, later used for other purposes, is stuccoed and has a tile roof. There are two storeys and attics, and two bays. The ground floor contains a shopfront, on the right bay of the upper floor is a canted oriel window, to its left is a sash window, and in the attic are gabled dormers with sashes.	II
36 Low Skellgate; 54.13492°N 1.52504°W	—	Early or mid-18th century	The house is in colourwashed brick, with a bracketed eaves cornice, and a slate roof with one coped gable. There are two storeys and five bays. The doorway is in the centre, the windows are sashes, and there are two flat-roofed dormers.	II
Former Fleece Public House; 54.13732°N 1.51870°W		Early or mid-18th century	The public house, later a private house, is roughcast, on a plinth, with a band and a pantile roof. There are two storeys and three bays. The central doorway has a moulded frame and a narrow fanlight, and the windows are sashes.	II
The Old Hall; 54.13413°N 1.52008°W		1738	The house, at right angles to the street, is in red brick, with a modillion eaves cornice and a Welsh slate roof. There are two storeys and attics, five bays, a recessed bay to the north, and a rear wing. The doorway has a round head and channelled quoins and voussoirs. There are two French windows, and the other windows are sashes with channelled voussoirs. Inside, there is high quality plasterwork.	II*
37 Market Place; 54.13594°N 1.52407°W		1739	The building is in whitewashed brick, with string courses and a wooden modillion eaves cornice. There are three storeys and four bays. The ground floor contains a modern shopfront, and above are sash windows, the middle two windows on the middle floor with iron balconies. On the building is a lead moulded initialled and dated rainwater head.	II
Bishopton Lodge; 54.13501°N 1.54185°W	—	c. 1750	The house is in brown brick, with rusticated quoins, a wooden modillion eaves cornice, and a pyramidal stone slate roof with a weathervane. There are two storeys and three bays, and flanking single-storey two-bay extensions. The central doorway has a moulded surround and a moulded cornice. To its left is a canted bay window, and the other windows are sashes with channelled stucco voussoirs. The inner bay of each extension has a round-arched carriage entry with channelled stucco voussoirs, and the outer bay contains a sash window and a pediment containing a Diocletian window.	II*
76, 77 and 78 Allhallowgate; 54.13816°N 1.52264°W	—	18th century (probable)	A row of three roughcast cottages, with a modillion eaves cornice, and a pantile roof. There are two storeys and three bays. The doorways have oblong fanlights and there is a round-arched passage doorway. On the ground floor are three canted bay windows, and the upper floor contains sash windows.	II
2 Bishopton; 54.13529°N 1.54065°W	—	18th century (probable)	The cottage is in colourwashed stone, the gable end facing the street is in brown brick, and it has a pantile roof. There are two storeys and one bay. The windows are horizontally sliding sashes, and the gable has bargeboards.	II
3–6 Bondgate Green; 54.13317°N 1.52006°W		Mid-18th century	A terrace of four cottages in brick, with a floor band and a pantile roof. There are two storeys and attics, and four bays. On the front are five doorways with plain surrounds. The windows are sashes with flush surrounds, and there are four attic dormers.	II
1, 2 and 3 Fisher Court; 54.13540°N 1.52537°W	—	18th century (probable)	A row of cottages in pebble and brick, mainly roughcast, with a pantile roof. There are two storeys and five bays. On the front are two doorways, and the windows are horizontally sliding sashes.	II
18 Fishergate; 54.13739°N 1.52372°W	—	18th century	The shop is rendered and has a sprocketed pantile roof. There are two storeys and two bays. On the ground floor is a modern shopfront, and the upper floor contains sash windows with stucco keystones.	II
4 and 5 High Skellgate; 54.13577°N 1.52489°W	—	18th century (or earlier)	A shop and a house in colourwashed brick, with a pantile roof and some stone slates. There are two storeys, the shop has two bays, and the house to the left has one bay. The shop has a modern shopfront, to its left is a passage entry, a window and a doorway. The windows are sashes.	II
13 High Skellgate; 54.13523°N 1.52519°W	—	18th century (or earlier)	The shop is in colourwashed brick, with a pantile roof and the gable end facing the street. There are two storeys and two bays. The doorway is in the centre, and the windows are sashes.	II
17 and 17A High Skellgate; 54.13527°N 1.52497°W	—	18th century (or earlier)	The building has a timber framed core, it is stuccoed on the front, elsewhere there is brick and cobble, and it has a pantile roof. There are two storeys and two bays. In the centre are paired doorways in moulded frames with moulded cornices. These are flanked by early 19th-century shop windows with moulded cornices, and on the upper floor are two horizontally sliding sash windows.	II
22 High Skellgate; 54.13569°N 1.52476°W	—	18th century (or earlier)	The building is in brick, and has a pantile roof, catslide at the rear, and two storeys. On the front is a doorway, and it is flanked by two shopfronts, the left one having pilasters with moulded plaster ornament to the capitals. The windows are horizontally sliding sash windows, one on the ground floor and two above.	II
5A, 5 and 6 Kirkgate; 54.13528°N 1.52262°W		18th century	A row of shops in red brick, with a wooden modillion eaves cornice and a hipped pantile roof. There are three storeys and six bays. On the ground floor, two of the shopfronts have fluted pilasters, and moulded consoles with ornamental finials. The upper floors contain sash windows.	II
16 and 17 Kirkgate; 54.13511°N 1.52176°W		18th century	A pair of shops in colourwashed brick with a pantile roof. There are three storeys and three bays. In the centre of the ground floor is a passage entry flanked by 19th-century shopfronts with panelled pilasters and moulded cornices. Outside these are doorways, each with Tuscan three-quarter columns, a semicircular fanlight, a pulvinated frieze and an open dentilled pediment. The upper floors contain sash windows with channelled wedge lintels and keystones. At the rear is a round-arched stair window.	II
26 Kirkgate; 54.13518°N 1.52181°W		18th century	The shop is in colourwashed brick with a floor band and a coped parapet. There are three storeys and three bays. On the ground floor is a 20th-century shopfront with fluted pilasters. The upper floors contain sash windows, those on the top floor horizontally sliding, and the middle window on each floor is blind.	II
11 and 12 Low Skellgate; 54.13456°N 1.52619°W	—	18th century (or earlier)	A pair of roughcast cottages with a pantile roof. There are two storeys and three bays. The doorways have wooden Tuscan frames, and the windows are horizontally sliding sashes.	II
34 Low Skellgate; 54.13475°N 1.52557°W	—	18th century	The house is in colourwashed brick, with a pantile roof and a coped gable. There are two storeys and three bays. The doorway has a moulded surround and an oblong fanlight. The windows are sashes with channelled stucco voussoirs. In the left bay is a carriage entry. On the roof is a flat-headed dormer.	II
14 Market Place; 54.13669°N 1.52309°W		18th century (or earlier)	The shop is stuccoed on the front, in limestone at the rear, and it has a slate roof. There are three storeys and one bay. The ground floor contains a modern projecting shopfront and a passage on the left, on the middle floor is a canted bay window with sashes, a moulded cornice and a fretwork valance, and the top floor has a sash window with channelled voussoirs.	II
34 Market Place; 54.13604°N 1.52441°W	—	18th century	The shop is stuccoed, with applied timber framing, and has a stone slate roof. There are three storeys and two bays. On the ground floor is a modern shopfront, and above are sash windows with flush frames, those on the middle floor paired.	II
42 Market Place; 54.13582°N 1.52338°W		18th century (probable)	The shop has a mid-19th-century roughcast front, with raised quoins, a moulded wooden eaves cornice, and a slate roof. There are three storeys and two bays. The ground floor contains a 19th-century shopfront that has five segmentally-headed bays with guilloché-patterned voussoirs, separated by panelled pilasters with moulded consoles to a moulded and dentilled entablature. On the upper floor are sash windows.	II
17 North Street; 54.13841°N 1.52382°W	—	18th century (or earlier)	A shop in brown brick with a pantile roof. There are three storeys and two bays. The right bay contains a 19th-century shopfront, to the left is a carriage entry with a depressed arch, and above are sash windows. The window above the carriage entry has a segmental arch, the windows over the doorway are horizontally sliding, and the two lower windows have channelled stucco voussoirs.	II
26 and 27 North Street; 54.13888°N 1.52410°W	—	18th century	The shop is stuccoed, and has a slate roof with coped gables and moulded kneelers. There are two storeys and five bays, the middle bay projecting slightly under a pediment. The ground floor contains a modern shopfront, and on the upper floor are sash windows with triple keystones.	II
65, 66 and 67 North Street; 54.13903°N 1.52444°W	—	18th century	A row of three rendered shops with a bracketed wooden eaves cornice and a pantile roof. There are two storeys and three bays. The ground floor contains three mid-19-century shopfronts and a passage entry. Each shopfront has fluted pilasters, and a cornice on moulded consoles. The windows have shaped lintels, and on the upper floor are sash windows.	II
9 Park Street; 54.13634°N 1.52754°W		18th century	The house is stuccoed, and has rusticated quoins, coved eaves and a slate roof. There are two storeys and three bays and a recessed bay on the left. In the centre is a doorway with rusticated jambs and voussoirs, and a semicircular fanlight. Above it is a Venetian window, the other windows are sashes and all the windows have vermiculated keystones and channelled stucco voussoirs.	II
12 Queen Street; 54.13691°N 1.52337°W		18th century	The office is rendered, and has a moulded wooden eaves cornice and a slate roof. The ground floor contains a shopfront with moulded pilasters, moulded scrolled consoles, and a moulded cornice. On the upper floor are two shallow canted oriel windows with casements.	II
22, 23 and 24 St Marygate; 54.13640°N 1.51879°W		18th century	A row of three stuccoed cottages with a slate roof. There are two storeys and four bays. On the front are three modern doors, and the windows are a mix of sash and casement windows.	II
25 and 26 St Marygate; 54.13630°N 1.51883°W		18th century (possible)	A pair of stuccoed houses with a pantile roof. There are two storeys and two bays. In the centre are two doorways with moulded frames and oblong fanlights, flanking an arched passage entry. The windows are sashes, and over all the ground floor openings is a moulded wooden cornice.	II
East part, 6 Westgate; 54.13627°N 1.52532°W	—	18th century	The shop is in brown brick and has a pantile roof. There are three storeys and one bay. On the ground floor is a modern shopfront, and above are sash windows.	II
West part of 6 Westgate and 7 Westgate; 54.13628°N 1.52543°W		Mid-18th century	The building is in brown brick, with bands, a modillion eaves cornice and a pantile roof. There are three storeys and two bays. The ground floor contains a mid-19th century shopfront with moulded pilasters and a cornice, and to the right is a shop window. Above the shopfront is a canted oriel window, and the other windows are sashes.	II
10, 11 and 11A Westgate; 54.13637°N 1.52580°W		18th century	A row of three shops in brick with a pantile roof. There are three storeys and five bays. The ground floor contains 19th-century shopfronts, on the fourth bay of the middle floor is a canted oriel window, the windows in the second bay on both upper floors are blind, and the other windows are sashes.	II
23 Westgate; 54.13615°N 1.52543°W	—	18th century (or earlier)	A stuccoed shop with a high parapet and two storeys. On the ground floor is a mid-19th-century shopfront, with panelled pilasters, elaborate scrolled consoles, fluted above, and mullions with tiny capitals. To the right is a round-arched passage entrance, and above is a sash window.	II
Brewers Arms; 54.13325°N 1.52027°W		18th century	The house is in colourwashed brick with a pantile roof. There are two storeys and three bays, and the windows are sashes.	II
Gooseberry Farmhouse; 54.14465°N 1.54396°W		18th century	The farmhouse is in pebble with limestone quoins, there is a brick extension to the south with a rendered gable end, and a pantile roof. There are two storeys and four bays, and a single-storey two-bay east wing. On the front is a doorway, the windows in the extension are sashes, and elsewhere they are horizontally-sliding sashes.	II
Barn, Gooseberry Farm; 54.14473°N 1.54410°W	—	18th century	The barn is in pebble, with some limestone, quoins and a pantile roof. There are brown brick extensions to the west, and the barn contains two doorways and casement windows. It is linked to the farmhouse by a brick cart shed.	II
Wall, Low Saint Agnesgate; 54.13525°N 1.51846°W	—	18th century (or earlier)	The wall runs along the west side of Low Saint Agnesgate from its junction with Minster Road, to the south for about 100 yards (91 m), and is in limestone. At the northern end it is about 4 feet (1.2 m) in height, and at the southern end about 9 feet (2.7 m) high.	II
Garden walls, St Anne's Hospital; 54.13365°N 1.51994°W	—	18th century	The walls on the river side of the hospital are in pebble and stone. There are tall side walls and the end wall is ramped upwards to meet them.	II
The Unicorn Hotel; 54.13600°N 1.52318°W		18th century	Originally a coaching inn, the hotel is whitewashed brick, with a modillion and dentilled eaves cornice. There are four storeys and three bays. At the right is a round-headed doorway with Tuscan three-quarter columns, an entablature, and a semicircular fanlight, above which is a suspended moulded flat hood on moulded scrolled consoles. The lower two floors contain canted bay windows with moulded cornices, and on the top two floors are sash windows.	II
Annex, The Unicorn Hotel; 54.13611°N 1.52313°W		18th century	The building, which is in grooved stucco or painted stone, has a wooden modillion eaves cornice and a blocking course, and a slate roof. There are three storeys and four bays. The ground floor has two shopfronts. The right, dating from the mid-19th century, has Tuscan pilasters and a moulded cornice. The left, dating from the late 19th century is more elaborate, with fluted pilasters, a door in a recessed porch with an oblong fanlight, another door in a recessed porch between plate glass windows, and glazing bars continued upwards to form a floral motif. On the upper floors are sash windows.	II
Turks Head Public House; 54.13480°N 1.52546°W		18th century	The public house is in colourwashed brick with a bracketed eaves cornice and a pantile roof. There are two storeys and three bays. The windows are sashes with moulded stucco surrounds, those on the ground floor with nailhead ornament. The ground floor has flanking pilasters, and over its openings is a moulded cornice with ball finials, and ornamented with roundels, chevrons and nailhead.	II
1 Bondgate; 54.13298°N 1.52193°W		1758	The house is in brick, with a floor band, a wooden modillion eaves cornice, and a slate roof with brick gable coping and kneelers. There are two storeys and three bays. The doorway has a moulded surround and a moulded cornice. The windows are sashes with channelled wedge lintels and keystones. In front of the house are cast iron railings with spear and fleur-de-lys finials.	II
Richardson's Drinking Fountain; 54.13191°N 1.52761°W		1758	The drinking fountain is in stone, and it contains a central round-headed niche with a broken spout and a semicircular bowl on a small bracket. This is flanked by rusticated piers, and above it is a shallow inscribed and dated pediment flanked by acroteria.	II
St Wilfrid's Well and gates 54.13421°N 1.52917°W		1762	The wellhead is in stone, and consists of a low coped wall containing a four-centred arch with a spout and a projecting trough. This is flanked by pairs of square gate piers, each with chamfered sides and a round-headed cap.	II
Low Lodge, Studley Royal Park, lamp and outbuildings 54.13305°N 1.54154°W	—	Mid to late 18th century	The lodge, later a private house, is in rendered brick and stone with a Westmorland slate roof. There is a single storey, two bays, a rear bay, and two wings formed by outbuildings. On the front facing the drive is a portico on six yew tree trunks. On the left is an arched doorway with an architrave, and in the centre is a bay window, above which is a wrought iron lamp bracket.	II
Former canal warehouse and manager's house 54.13247°N 1.51865°W		1770–73 (probable)	The former warehouse on the Ripon Canal is in sandstone, partly roughcast, with a double-hipped pantile roof. There are two storeys, and on the front facing the wharf are two bays, each with a wagon entrance on the ground floor and a loading door above. On the east side are steps in red brick, and on the road side are casement windows. The house is roughcast with a pantile roof, two storeys and three bays. The doorway has an oblong fanlight, above it is a blind window, the other windows are sashes and on the road side is a stair window.	II
2 Duck Hill; 54.13544°N 1.52282°W		Late 18th century	An office in painted red brick on a plinth, with stone dressings. There are two storeys and two bays. On the right is a recessed doorway, and the windows are sashes with wedge lintels.	II
30 and 31 Blossomgate; 54.13811°N 1.52746°W	—	Late 18th century	A pair of houses in colourwashed rendered red brick with a slate roof. There are two storeys and four bays. On the left is a canted bay window, To its right is a round-headed doorway with pilasters, a fanlight and a flat hood, and beyond is a lean-to extension containing a doorway. The windows are sashes with painted wedge lintels and keystones.	II
Coach house, Minster House; 54.13467°N 1.52147°W	—	Late 18th century	The coach house is in pink brick, with stone imposts and sill bands, and a slate roof. There are four bays, the middle two with one storey and the outer bays with two storeys and pyramidal roofs. On each bay is a Diocletian window with a mullion and sashes, those in the centre bays forming fanlights to the coach doors, and those in the outer bays in recessed panels.	II
Walls to the coach house yard, Minster House; 54.13474°N 1.52119°W	—	Late 18th century	The walls are in pink brick with stone coping, and consist of two quadrant-shaped walls.	II
Rose Bridge; 54.12905°N 1.54621°W		Late 18th century	The bridge carries a track over a stream. It is in gritstone, and consists of two shallow arches. The round cutwater is carried up as a pilaster to rounded coping, and there is a projecting band at road level.	II
Former coach house, Crowners Close; 54.14017°N 1.53053°W	—	c. 1790	The coach house is in brick with a hipped slate roof. There are two storeys and four bays. In the centre is a segmental-arched coach entrance, flanked by circular windows, with a similar window above. The other windows are sashes, one horizontally sliding, and to the left is a former square window with four pigeon openings.	II
Ripon Town Hall; 54.13590°N 1.52389°W		1799–1801	The town hall, designed by James Wyatt, is stuccoed, the ground floor is rusticated, and on the front is a sill band and an inscribed frieze. There are two storeys and five bays, the middle three bays projecting under a dentilled pediment containing a clock face. The ground floor contains a central round-arched doorway with a fanlight, and round-headed sash windows, all recessed in round arches. On the upper floor are four Ionic columns, and tall sash windows in moulded architraves, those in the outer bays with stone balustrades, and in the middle three bays with curved cast iron railings.	II*
3 Low Skellgate; 54.13495°N 1.52554°W	—	c. 1800	A house, at one time a shop, in painted red brick, with a floor band and a slate roof. There are two storeys and three bays. In the centre is a doorway with pilasters and a flat hood, to its left is a shop window with pilasters and a flat hood, and the other windows are sashes with wedge lintels and keystones. At the extreme left is a passage door with a fanlight.	II
71 and 72 North Street; 54.13866°N 1.52430°W	—	c. 1800	A pair of houses, later shops, on a corner site, in red brick, the right shop rendered and colourwashed, both with a tile roof. There are two storeys and two bays. The left shop has an early 19th-century shopfront, the windows with pilasters and a canopy, and to its right is a doorway with a fanlight and a wedge lintel. The right shop has a larger late-19th-century shopfront with pilasters and a fascia board, and a recessed doorway to the right. On the right return is a three-pane shop window. The windows to its right, and on the upper floor on both fronts, are sashes with wedge lintels and keystones.	II
1 and 2 Low Skellgate; 54.13499°N 1.52550°W	—	c. 1800	A house, later two shops, in red brick with a slate roof. There are two storeys and three bays. The ground floor contains wooden shopfronts with flanking pilasters and a fascia board. On the upper floor are three sash windows, the left larger, with painted wedge lintels and raised keystones.	II
50, 51, 53, 54, 55, and 56 Allhallowgate; 54.13778°N 1.52017°W	—	18th or early 19th century	A row of six buildings, mainly houses, in brown brick, some rendered, with roofs of pantile and slate, and two storeys. Most doorways have oblong fanlights, between are passage doors, and most windows are sashes, some horizontally sliding. Features include a bow window, and a shopfront with a gabled dormer above.	II
57–74 Allhallowgate; 54.13803°N 1.52104°W		18th or early 19th century	A row of buildings, mainly houses, with shops and a public house, in brown brick, some rendered, with roofs of pantile and slate. Most have two storeys, and two of the buildings have three storeys. Most doorways have oblong fanlights, and most windows are sashes, some horizontally sliding. There are also shop windows and a bow window.	II
1 Duck Hill; 54.13554°N 1.52286°W		18th or early 19th century	The shop is in colourwashed brick with a slate roof. There are two storeys and two bays. The ground floor contains a shopfront with a frieze, and to the left is a doorway. On the upper floor are sash windows.	II
25, 24a and 24b Low Skellgate; 54.13434°N 1.52622°W	—	18th or early 19th century	A row of cottages in pink brick on a plinth, with a pantile roof and stone slate at the eaves. There are two storeys and three bays, and a narrow recessed bay on the left. The windows are sashes, some horizontally sliding, all with keystones. To the right is a doorway with moulded panels and a keystone. To its left is a mid-19th-century shop window that has an elaborate frame with pilasters and decorative panelling. The narrow left bay has a slate roof and contains a doorway with a fanlight and a segmental-headed window.	II
9 Queen Street; 54.13709°N 1.52333°W		18th or early 19th century	The shop is in brown brick with a pantile roof. There are two storeys and attics, and three bays. The ground floor contains a modern shopfront, on the upper floor are sash windows with moulded surrounds, and the attic has two modern flat-topped dormers.	II
21 St Marygate; 54.13646°N 1.51876°W		18th or early 19th century	The house is stuccoed and has a pantile roof. There are two storeys and two bays. The doorway on the left has wooden Tuscan pilasters and an oblong fanlight. The windows are sashes, and over the doorway and the ground floor window is a moulded cornice.	II
28 and 29 St Marygate; 54.13689°N 1.51852°W	—	18th or early 19th century	A pair of houses in brown brick with a pantile roof. There are two storeys and three bays. In the centre are two doorways with oblong fanlights, and the windows are sashes. Above the doorways is a blind window.	II
Barns behind 6 Bishopton; 54.13532°N 1.54145°W	—	18th or early 19th century	The barns are in pebble, with limestone quoins and dressings, and a pantile roof. There is a two-storey extension to the east. The barns contain board doors, stable doors, a loading door, two tiers of slit vents, and other upper floor openings.	II
Bishopton Bridge; 54.13412°N 1.54032°W		Late 18th or early 19th century	The bridge carries Studley Road (B6265 road) over the River Laver, and it was widened in 1885. It is in stone and consists of a single segmental arch. The bridge has a band, and a coped parapet with end piers.	II
Borrage Bridge; 54.13382°N 1.52646°W		18th or early 19th century	The bridge carries Low Skelgate over the River Skell, and it was widened in the late 19th century. The east side is in limestone, the west side is in millstone grit, and the bridge consists of three segmental arches. It has cutwaters, a band, and a parapet that splays outwards at the ends.	II
Borrage Terrace; 54.13207°N 1.52795°W	—	Late 18th or early 19th century	A terrace of four houses in stone, with a floor band, a moulded eaves course and parapet and a slate roof. There are two storeys and eight bays. The doorways are in relieving arches, and have semicircular fanlights. The windows are sashes with sunk panels in aprons, and there are two gabled dormers.	II
Milepost; 54.13201°N 1.54786°W	—	Late 18th or early 19th century	The milepost on the south side of Studley Road (B6265 road) is in cast iron. It has a triangular plan with a sloping top, and is about 80 centimetres (31 in) in height. On the top face is the distance to Skipton, the lower faces have pointing hands, on the left face is the distance to Pateley and the right face to Ripon.	II
Old Park House; 54.13632°N 1.52826°W	—	Late 18th or early 19th century	The house is in brown brick, with a projecting wooden modillion eaves cornice and a hipped slate roof. There are three storeys and three bays. The central doorway has a moulded surround, two Tuscan half-columns, and an entablature. It is flanked by canted bay windows with moulded cornices, and the other windows are sashes with channelled stucco voussoirs.	II
The Royal Oak Public House; 54.13548°N 1.52258°W		Late 18th or early 19th century	The public house is roughcast, with sill bands, a modillion and dentiled eaves cornice, and a slate roof. There are three storeys and five bays. In the centre is a round-headed doorway with panelled pilasters, moulded voussoirs and imposts, and a modillion and dentilled pediment. To its left is a mid-19th century shopfront with grooved pilasters, moulded brackets and a moulded cornice with ball finials. Elsewhere, there are sash windows.	II
New Bridge; 54.13347°N 1.52043°W		1811	The bridge carries Bondgate Green (B6265 road) over the River Skell. It is in sandstone, and consists of three segmental rusticated arches with keystones. The cutwaters have shaped buttresses above, and the bridge has a band, and a coped parapet ending in cylindrical piers.	II
1–4 Court Terrace; 54.13542°N 1.52154°W		c. 1820	A row of four cottages in red brick with a slate roof. There are two storeys and four bays. Each cottage has a doorway with divided fanlights, and the windows are horizontally sliding sashes. All the openings have wedge lintels.	II
Stone on the south bank of the River Skell; 54.13114°N 1.53893°W		1820	The stone has a metal plaque with the date, and an inscription indicting the location of the level of Skell Crooks Dam.	II
42 Allhallowgate; 54.13741°N 1.51954°W	—	Early 19th century	The house is roughcast, and has a pantile roof with stone slate verges. There are two storeys and two bays. The doorway is on the left, to its right is a shop window with a moulded cornice, and the other windows are casements.	II
44 and 45 Allhallowgate; 54.13738°N 1.51937°W	—	Early 19th century	The house is in brown brick on a stone plinth, with a slate roof. There are two storeys and two bays. The doorway has a reeded frame, an oblong fanlight and a cornice, and the windows are sashes.	II
47, 48, 49 and 50 Blossomgate; 54.13722°N 1.52732°W	—	Early 19th century	The building is in brown brick with a roof of pantile and slate. There are two storeys and four bays. The doorway has an oblong fanlight, and the windows are sashes in moulded frames.	II
Wall and fence, 7 Bishopton; 54.13497°N 1.54174°W	—	Early 19th century	In front of the house is a dwarf wall in brown brick with stone coping. On the wall is a wooden post and rail fence with moulded finials to the principal posts.	II
Wall, gate and gate piers, 8 Bishopton; 54.13491°N 1.54212°W	—	Early 19th century	At the entry to the drives are two sets of cast iron gates with delicate openwork piers, each with a tent finial. Attached is a dwarf wall in brown brick with stone coping.	II
Wall and railings, 8 Bishopton; 54.13483°N 1.54225°W	—	Early 19th century	In front of the house is a dwarf wall in brown brick with stone coping. On the wall are cast iron railings with baluster finials, and at the east end is a full height wall.	II
1 Bishopton Grove; 54.13547°N 1.54049°W	—	Early 19th century	The house is stuccoed, and has a moulded eaves cornice, a blocking course, and a slate roof. There are two storeys, an east range of ten bays, a south range of two bays, and a semicircular projection at the junction. The doors have oblong fanlights, baseless Tuscan fluted columns, a reeded frieze and a dentilled cornice, and at the north end is a doorway with fluted pilasters and a moulded cornice. The windows are sashes with flush frames.	II
16–21 Bondgate; 54.13234°N 1.52139°W		Early 19th century	A terrace of six cottages in brick with a pantile roof. There are two storeys and six bays. The doorways have oblong fanlights, some blocked, and the windows are flush framed sashes. In the centre is a round-arched passage entry.	II
9 Coltsgate Hill; 54.13864°N 1.52528°W	—	Early 19th century	The house is in colourwashed brick with a slate roof. There are two storeys and three bays. The central doorway has panelled pilasters and an oblong fanlight, and above it is a blind panel. The windows are sashes in moulded surrounds, those on the ground floor with cornices.	II
10–13 Coltsgate Hill; 54.13871°N 1.52540°W		Early 19th century	A row of four cottages in whitewashed brick with a pantile roof. There are two storeys and four bays. Each cottage has a doorway with an oblong fanlight, and a flush-framed sash window in each floor. At the left is a round-arched entry.	II
3 High Skellgate; 54.13583°N 1.52486°W	—	Early 19th century	A shop in brown brick with a pantile roof. There are three storeys and two bays. The ground floor contains a modern shopfront, and on the upper floors are sash windows, those on the top floor horizontally sliding, all with flat brick arches.	II
6–8 High Skellgate; 54.13567°N 1.52495°W	—	Early 19th century	Three shops in brown brick with pantile roofs. The right two shops are paired and have two storeys and three bays. They have a contemporary shopfront containing paired central doorways with oblong fanlights, a three-light window to the left and a sash window to the right. The windows on the upper floors are sashes. The left shop has three storeys and two bays. On the ground floor is a shopfront with three lights and a moulded cornice on moulded scrolled consoles. The middle floor contains two canted oriel windows, and on the top floor are sashes.	II
19 and 20 High Skellgate; 54.13549°N 1.52487°W	—	Early 19th century	Two shops in brown brick with a pantile roof. There are two storeys, and each shop has two bays. The left shop has a shopfront with a recessed doorway on the left, panelled pilasters and a cornice, and to the right is a doorway, The right shop has a round-arched doorway and a shop window with three round-arched lights and slender columns. On the upper floor are sash windows.	II
21 High Skellgate; 54.13559°N 1.52482°W	—	Early 19th century	The house is roughcast and has a pantile roof. There are two storeys and three bays. The doorway has an oblong fanlight and a Tuscan surround, the windows are sashes with flush frames, and to the left is a passage entry.	II
24 High Skellgate; 54.13595°N 1.52455°W	—	Early 19th century	A shop in brown brick with a pantile roof, it has three storeys and two bays. The ground floor contains a late 19th-century shopfront, with panelled pilasters and a moulded cornice, to its left is a carriage entry, and on the upper floors are sash windows.	II
2–6 King Street; 54.13390°N 1.52211°W		Early 19th century	A row of five houses in brown brick with two storeys. The right three have one bay each and contain a doorway, two with oblong fanlights, and a sash window in each floor. The left two houses are taller and have three bays. In the centre are two doorways approached by steps, the windows are sashes, and all the openings have channelled stucco voussoirs.	II
7 and 8 King Street; 54.13369°N 1.52215°W		Early 19th century	A house and a shop on a corner site, in brown brick, with a stone plinth, bracketed eaves and a pantile roof. There are two storeys and three bays. On the right corner is a contemporary shopfront with a doorway on the angle, to the left is a doorway with an oblong fanlight, and the windows are sashes. All the openings have channelled lintels and keystones.	II
11A Kirkgate; 54.13506°N 1.52235°W	—	Early 19th century	The cottage is in brick and has a pantile roof. There are two storeys and attics, and one bay. The doorway is on the left, and there is a horizontally sliding sash window in each floor.	II
14 and 15 Kirkgate; 54.13514°N 1.52188°W		Early 19th century	The interior of the shop is probably older. The front is in colourwashed brick, there is limestone at the rear, and a wooden modillion eaves cornice. The shop has three storeys and two bays. On the front is a mid-19th-century shopfront, with panelling to the sill level and a moulded cornice on cut brackets that continues over a passage entry to the right. The upper floors contain sash windows.	II
23, 24 and 25 Kirkgate; 54.13518°N 1.52173°W		Early 19th century	A shop in whitewashed brick with a hipped stone slate roof. There are three storeys and three bays. On the ground floor is a late 19th-century shopfront with panelled sides, elaborately carved consoles, and moulded spandrels to the shop windows. The upper floors contain sash windows with keystones.	II
33 and 34 Kirkgate; 54.13532°N 1.52229°W		Early 19th century	The buildings are in brown brick with a slate roof. There are three storeys and two bays. The ground floor contains two mid-19th-century shopfronts. The right one has shouldered arched lights and moulded Gothic brackets to the cornice, and the left shopfront has panelled piers and moulded scrolled consoles to the moulded cornice. The upper floors contain casement windows, those on the right with keystones.	II
39 Kirkgate; 54.13567°N 1.52273°W	—	Early 19th century	The shop is in brown brick with a slate roof. There are three storeys and two bays. The ground floor contains a mid-19th-century shopfront with panelled pilasters, scrolled consoles and a moulded fascia, and to the left is a recessed doorway. On the upper floors are sash windows with keystones.	II
6 Low Skellgate; 54.13478°N 1.52584°W	—	Early 19th century	The building is in pink brick, and has two storeys and one bay. On the ground floor is a contemporary shopfront, the doorway with moulded pilasters and roundels, and an oblong fanlight. The window to the right has Tuscan pilasters and an entablature, and over both is a dentilled cornice. The upper floor contains a sash window.	II
26–30 Low Skellgate; 54.13450°N 1.52599°W		Early 19th century	A row of cottages in pink brick, with paired eaves brackets and roofs of pantile and slate. There are two storeys and seven bays. Some of the doorways have semicircular fanlights, and one has a reeded surround. The windows are sashes with moulded surrounds and channelled stucco voussoirs.	II
41 Market Place; 54.13584°N 1.52349°W	—	Early 19th century	The building is in brown brick, with three storeys and attics, and two bays under a pediment with a Diocletian window in the tympanum. The ground floor contains a contemporary shopfront with pilasters, paterae, and a dentilled cornice, and over the doorway is a dentilled pediment. The windows are sashes with channelled wedge lintels and keystones.	II
28 North Street; 54.13902°N 1.52405°W	—	Early 19th century	The house is in brown brick, with a floor band, a wooden modillion eaves cornice, and a hipped slate roof. There are two storeys and three bays. The central doorway has a Tuscan surround, with pilasters, a semicircular fanlight, moulded imposts and a pediment, and the windows are sashes.	II
49 and 50 North Street; 54.13971°N 1.52434°W	—	Early 19th century	A pair of cottages in brown brick with a pantile roof. There are two storeys and two bays. Each cottage has a doorway on the left, and a casement window on each floor. All the openings have wedge lintels.	II
53 North Street; 54.13961°N 1.52436°W	—	Early 19th century	The cottage is in brown brick with a pantile roof. There are two storeys and one bay, and the openings have been altered.	II
54 and 55 North Street; 54.13952°N 1.52440°W		Early 19th century	The shop, on a corner site, is in painted brown brick, with a pantile roof on the left and a slate roof on the right. There are two storeys and four bays, the left two bays higher. On the left is a shopfront with a central doorway and moulded pilasters, to its right is a shop window and a small window, and the upper floor contains modern windows. On the left return is a shop window.	II
73 North Street; 54.13857°N 1.52420°W	—	Early 19th century	A house and a shop in pink brick with a pantile roof. There are two storeys and two bays. The left bay contains a mid-19th-century shopfront with Tuscan columns and a moulded cornice. To the right is a doorway with an oblong fanlight, and a sash window, and on the upper floor are two sash windows. All the openings have channelled stucco voussoirs.	II
77 North Street; 54.13813°N 1.52391°W	—	Early 19th century	The office is rendered, and has three storeys and two bays. On the front is a pediment containing a fluted oval patera in the tympanum. On the extreme right is a doorway with a Tuscan surround, panelled reveals and an oblong fanlight. The windows are sashes with channelled stucco voussoirs.	II
Rear of 82 and 83 North Street; 54.13779°N 1.52390°W	—	Early 19th century	Terraced houses to which single-storey shop extensions have been added, in pink brick, with sill bands, and a hipped slate roof with pantile at the rear. There are three storeys and seven bays. In the centre is a carriage arch, and the windows are sashes.	II
85 North Street; 54.13770°N 1.52365°W	—	Early 19th century	A shop in colourwashed brick with a pantile roof. There are three storeys and one bay. The ground floor contains a modern shopfront and a passage entry to the left, and on each upper floor is a sash window.	II
10 Park Street; 54.13630°N 1.52781°W	—	Early 19th century	The house is in brown brick, the upper two floors roughcast, with quoins, a sill band and a pantile roof. There are three storeys and three bays. The central doorway has an oblong fanlight and an elaborate surround, with a fluted frieze and a modillion and dentilled cornice. Above the doorway is a canted oriel window with a tent roof, and the other windows are sashes with channelled stucco voussoirs. To the left is a two-storey four-bay extension containing sash windows, one blind, a blind round arch, and at the extreme left is a carriage entry.	II
12 Park Street and 12 Burnham Close; 54.13640°N 1.53186°W	—	Early 19th century	The house is in brown brick, with a sill band, paired gutter brackets, and a hipped slate roof. There are two storeys and four bays. The doorway has an oblong fanlight, reeded pilasters and an entablature. The windows are sashes with channelled stucco voussoirs.	II
2–5 Skellgarths; 54.13470°N 1.52271°W	—	Early 19th century	A row of four houses in brown brick with pantile roofs. There are two storeys and four bays. The doorways, which have oblong fanlights, are in pairs, and the windows are sashes, those in the right two houses with channelled stucco voussoirs.	II
11, 12 and 13 Skellgarths; 54.13418°N 1.52231°W	—	Early 19th century	A row of houses in pink brick, with a slate roof and coped gables. There are two storeys and six bays. The doorways have oblong fanlights, and the windows are sashes with flush frames.	II
3 and 4 Smithsons Court; 54.13823°N 1.52434°W	—	Early 19th century	A pair of houses in orange-red brick at the front and pebble stone at the rear, with limestone quoins and a pantile roof. There are two storeys and five bays. The doorways have oblong fanlights, the windows are sashes, and all the openings have channelled stucco voussoirs.	II
30, 31 and 32 St Marygate; 54.13699°N 1.51850°W	—	Early 19th century	A row of three cottages in brown brick with cut wooden brackets to the eaves, and a pantile roof,. There are two storeys and four bays. On the front are three doorways, the windows are sashes, and the ground floor openings have channelled stucco voussoirs.	II
4 Water Skellgate; 54.13503°N 1.52437°W	—	Early 19th century	The house is in brick, stuccoed on the right side, and with a pantile roof. There are two storeys and two bays. The central doorway has an oblong fanlight, and the windows are sashes.	II
5 Water Skellgate; 54.13504°N 1.52425°W	—	Early 19th century	The house is in pink brick with a slate roof. There are three storeys and two bays. The central doorway has fluted half-columns and a semicircular fanlight. To its right is a segmental-headed carriage arch, and the windows are sashes with channelled stucco voussoirs.	II
5 Westgate; 54.13628°N 1.52522°W	—	Early 19th century	The building is in brown brick, with a floor band, a sill band, and a hipped slate roof. There are three storeys, three bays and a basement. Steps flanked by a cast iron balustrade lead up to the central doorway that has Tuscan three-quarters columns, an entablature and a semicircular fanlight. The windows are sashes with channelled lintels.	II
25 and 26 Westgate; 54.13614°N 1.52518°W	—	Early 19th century	A pair of shops in brown brick, with a pantile roof, three storeys and two bays. In the centre of the ground floor is a doorway with a semicircular fanlight, and a wooden doorcase of unfluted Roman Doric half-columns, an entablature and an open pediment. This is flanked by shopfronts, and the upper floors contain sash windows with channelled stucco voussoirs.	II
Coney Garth; 54.13869°N 1.52958°W		Early 19th century	The house is in yellow brick, with a sill band, overhanging eaves, and a hipped slate roof. There are two storeys and three bays. On the front is an elliptical-shaped porch with Tuscan columns and an entablature, and the doorway has a semicircular fanlight and moulded imposts and voussoirs. The windows are sashes, and on the side is a verandah on cast iron piers, with ornamental openwork leaf decoration.	II
Danby House and gate posts 54.13203°N 1.51707°W		Early 19th century	The house is in brown brick with a pantile roof. There are three storeys and three bays. The central doorway has a Tuscan frame, and a doorway with a semicircular fanlight containing Gothic glazing, and moulded imposts. The windows are sashes with wedge lintels. In the garden wall to the west of the house are rusticated gate posts, coved to a plain cornice, with pyramidal caps.	II
Gate piers, Danby House and Field House; 54.13224°N 1.51766°W		Early 19th century	The gate piers at the entrance to the drive are in rusticated stone. Each pier has a moulded cornice and a bulgy finial.	II
Field House; 54.13198°N 1.51688°W		Early 19th century	The house is in brown brick with a hipped slate roof. There are two storeys and three bays. The doorway has a Tuscan surround, a semicircular fanlight, and moulded imposts. On the right return are two blind semicircular arches, and stone steps leading to an upper floor doorway.	II
Main block, Holy Trinity School; 54.13854°N 1.52707°W		Early 19th century	The school building is in brown brick, and has a slate roof with stone pedimented gables. There is one storey and seven bays, the middle bay wider and projecting slightly. Each outer bay contains a tall round-arched window, and above it is a sunk oblong panel. In the centre of the middle bay is a doorway under a relieving arch, the eaves have two pairs of gadrooned scrolled consoles, between which is a plinth, and at the top is a shaped pediment.	II
Ivy House; 54.13231°N 1.52888°W	—	Early 19th century	The house is in brick with stone dressings and sill bands. There are three storeys and basements. The central doorway has pilasters and an oblong fanlight. Above it is a blind window, and the other windows are sashes with stone voussoirs.	II
Lamb and Flag Public House; 54.13555°N 1.52504°W		Early 19th century	The public house is in whitewashed brick, with wooden brackets to the eaves. There are three storeys and three bays. In the left bay is a segmental-headed carriage entry flanked by spur stones. The windows are sashes with wedge lintels.	II
Lock House; 54.12863°N 1.50627°W		Early 19th century	The house is roughcast, and has overhanging eaves and a hipped slate roof. There are two storeys and three bays. Most of the windows are sashes with arched heads, and the doorway has an arched fanlight.	II
Skell Cottage; 54.13237°N 1.52968°W	—	Early 19th century	The house is in brick with a slate roof, two storeys and two parallel ranges. On the front are two gables, and it contains a doorway with fluted jambs and a cornice on brackets, and sash windows in moulded frames. The rear wing is lower, and contains an arched window with Gothic glazing, and on the garden front are two two-storey bay windows.	II
The Cottages, Coltsgate Hill; 54.13920°N 1.52610°W		Early 19th century	A row of houses in brown brick that have pantile roofs with stone slate verges. There are two storeys, some houses are taller, and a total of nine bays. The windows are sashes, and one house has a trellis-work gabled porch with a traceried bargeboard.	II
The Grange; 54.13509°N 1.54243°W	—	Early 19th century	The house is in brown brick, with a moulded stone eaves cornice, a blocking course, and a slate roof with coped gables. There are two storeys and three bays. The middle bay projects slightly under a pediment. The left bay contains a two-storey semicircular bow window, the right bay contains a single-storey semicircular bow window, and the other windows are sashes with stone voussoirs. On the right return is a doorway with two fluted Ionic half-columns, a semicircular fanlight, and a modillion pediment. To the left is a later single-storey three-bay extension with an embattled parapet.	II
The White Horse Public House; 54.13922°N 1.52452°W		Early 19th century	The public house is rendered and has a slate roof. There are three storeys and two bays. The central doorway has moulded pilasters, panelled reveals, an oblong fanlight and a cornice. It is flanked by two-storey segmental bow windows with moulded mullions, panelled friezes and cornices, and on the top floor are sash windows.	II
Trinity Cottages; 54.13824°N 1.52776°W	—	Early 19th century	A pair of stuccoed cottages with a hipped slate roof. There are two storeys and four bays. One doorway has a reeded surround and an oblong fanlight, and the windows are sashes.	II
Wall, Borrage Green Lane; 54.13224°N 1.52899°W	—	Early 19th century (probable)	The wall runs along the south side of Borrage Green Lane, from the west of the houses on Harrogate Road to Skell Cottage. It is in pebble, with two bands of limestone courses and limestone coping, and has limestone quoins. It is about 8 feet (2.4 m) in height, dropping to about 4 feet (1.2 m).	II
Wall, Harrogate Road and Borrage Green Lane; 54.13226°N 1.52746°W	—	Early 19th century (probable)	The wall runs along the west side of Harrogate Road from Borrage Bridge to Borrage Green Lane, then along the north side of Borrage Green Lane to the east of Ivy House. On Harrogate Road it is in limestone, and along Borrage Green Lane it is in pebble with two bands of limestone courses and stone coping. The wall is about 3 feet (0.91 m) in height.	II
Warehouse, Council Depot; 54.13399°N 1.51611°W	—	Early 19th century	The former warehouse is in magnesium limestone with a hipped slate roof. There are two storeys, fronts of five and three bays, and a rear lean-to. The openings include doorways, windows and loft doorways, some blocked.	II
West Grange; 54.13944°N 1.53070°W	—	Early 19th century	The house is in pink brick, with a moulded eaves cornice and blocking course, and a hipped roof. There are two storeys and fronts of three bays. On the front is a porch with panelled columns and an entablature, and a door with an oblong fanlight. On the west front is a canted bay window.	II
Holy Trinity Church; 54.13803°N 1.52848°W		1826–27	The church, designed by Thomas Taylor, is in stone. It consists of a nave, north and south transepts, a chancel and a west steeple. The steeple has a tower with three stages and a broach spire. The windows are lancets, and part of the body of the church has an embattled parapet.	II
Southwest block, Ripon Grammar School; 54.13901°N 1.53930°W	—	1827	The building is in pink brick, with a sill band, wooden bracketed eaves, and a hipped slate roof. There are two storeys and five bays. In the centre is a Greek Doric temple front acting as a porch, and the windows are sashes. To the east is a late 19th-century extension in Gothic style in red brick that has a tower with a pyramidal roof.	II
Gate piers, Canal Saw Mills; 54.13295°N 1.51921°W	—	1829	The gate piers flanking the entrance to the canal wharf are in vermiculated and rusticated sandstone. Each pier has a coved cornice, and a pyramidal cap with a ball finial.	II
The Court House; 54.13572°N 1.52083°W		1830	A county courthouse, later a museum, it is in stone on a plinth, with quoins, a sill band, moulded eaves, and a hipped slate roof. There is one storey and five bays. The doorway has two Doric columns, an entablature, an oblong fanlight and a pediment. The windows are round-headed sashes with impost blocks and keystones. There are flanking coped walls, each containing a round-headed doorway with impost blocks and a keystone.	II*
18 Coltsgate Hill; 54.13914°N 1.52570°W	—	Early or mid-19th century	The house is stuccoed, and has two storeys and four bays. The windows are sashes with channelled stucco voussoirs.	II
19 Coltsgate Hill; 54.13905°N 1.52570°W	—	Early or mid-19th century	The house is in brown brick with a pantile roof. There are two storeys and two bays, and a three-storey one-bay extension on the left with a hipped roof. The two doorways have oblong fanlights, some windows are modern, and the others are sashes with channelled stucco voussoirs.	II
28–36 Heckler Lane; 54.13181°N 1.52354°W		Early or mid-19th century	A row of houses and a shop on a corner site, in brown brick with a hipped pantile roof. There are two storeys, six bays on the east front and two on the south front. The windows are sashes, two are horizontally sliding, and on the south front is a shopfront.	II
20, 21 and 22 North Street; 54.13852°N 1.52392°W	—	Early or mid-19th century	A pair of shops in brown brick with moulded gutters on wooden brackets, and a slate roof. There are three storeys and five bays. In the centre is a carriage entrance and this is flanked by contemporary shopfronts, including three doorways with Tuscan pilasters, and over all is a moulded cornice. The upper floors contain sash windows with wedge lintels.	II
4 and 5 Park Street; 54.13642°N 1.52672°W	—	Early or mid-19th century	The two houses are stuccoed, and have a hipped slate roof. There are three storeys and four bays. The doorway has a semicircular fanlight, reeded pilasters and a moulded cornice on tall fluted consoles, and to its left is a carriage entrance with a depressed-arched head. On the first bay of the middle floor is a canted oriel windows, and on the third bay is a segmental-bowed oriel window. The windows are sashes, some with channelled stucco voussoirs.	II
22 Westgate; 54.13617°N 1.52560°W	—	Early or mid-19th century (probable)	A shop with a stuccoed front, quoins and a pantile roof. There are two storeys and two bays, On the ground floor is a mid-19th-century shopfront with pilasters, and windows that have glazing bars with small capitals and depressed arched heads. The upper floor contains sash windows with channelled voussoirs.	II
Green Royd; 54.13579°N 1.53736°W	—	Early or mid-19th century	The house is in brown brick, with a moulded eaves cornice and a slate roof. There are two storeys, three bays, and flanking one-storey extensions with parapets ramped up to the house. The central doorway has a semicircular fanlight and a pediment, to its left is a canted bay window, and the other windows are sashes with channelled stucco voussoirs.	II
Haytor House; 54.14344°N 1.52370°W	—	Early or mid-19th century	The house is in stone, with deeply projecting eaves and a pyramidal stone slate roof. There are two storeys and fronts of two bays. The windows are casements with three lights and mullions, and hood moulds.	II
The Black Swan Public House; 54.13623°N 1.52575°W		Early or mid-19th century (or earlier)	The public house is stuccoed, and has wooden gutter brackets and a pantile roof. There are two storeys and three bays. The right bay has a carriage entry, over which is a canted oriel window. The doorway has a plain surround, panelled reveals, an oblong fanlight and a dentilled cornice on corbels, and the windows are sashes.	II
Former Hornblower Restaurant; 54.13518°N 1.52268°W		1836	Originally a police cell block, later used for other purposes, it is in brown brick, the ground floor whitewashed, and has gutter brackets. The ground floor contains doorways and windows with segmental heads, and on the upper floor are two barred square windows, between which is a stone plaque with a defaced coat of arms.	II
Railway Bridge near Hillshaw House; 54.13483°N 1.51289°W	—	1845–48	The disused railway bridge is in sandstone. It consists of a single semicircular arch with rusticated voussoirs, and a plain impost band. There are splayed retaining walls to the embankment.	II
Railway Bridge near the Recreation Ground; 54.13947°N 1.51371°W	—	1845–48	The disused railway bridge is in sandstone. It consists of a single semicircular arch with rusticated voussoirs, and a plain impost band. There are splayed retaining walls to the embankment.	II
Railway Bridge near The Beeches; 54.14039°N 1.51373°W	—	1845–48	The disused railway bridge is in sandstone. It consists of a single semicircular arch with rusticated voussoirs, and a plain impost band. There are splayed retaining walls to the embankment.	II
Skell Railway Bridge; 54.13328°N 1.51243°W		1845–48	The bridge was built by the Leeds and Thirsk Railway to carry its line over the River Skell, and has subsequently been used to carry the A61 road. It is in sandstone, and consists of three segmental arches with rusticated voussoirs. The bridge has buttresses, a band and a coped parapet.	II
Main block, Ripon Community Hospital; 54.13548°N 1.52688°W		1850	The hospital is in red brick on a stone plinth, with quoins, floor and sill bands, a moulded eaves cornice, a stone parapet, and a hipped slate roof. There are two storeys, a central block of six bays, and lower flanking wings. The middle two bays project slightly under a broken pediment, and contain a round-headed doorway with a moulded surround, and a semicircular fanlight with a keystone. This is flanked by rusticated piers and margin lights with pilasters. Above is a frieze containing "DISPENSARY". Elsewhere there are sash windows, those on the ground floor with shouldered and eared surrounds and keystones.	II
3, 4 and 5 Bishopton; 54.13526°N 1.54077°W	—	Mid-19th century	The houses are in brown brick with a slate roof. There are two storeys and four bays. The two doorways have oblong fanlights, and the windows are sashes.	II
28 and 29 Bondgate Green; 54.13377°N 1.52081°W		Mid-19th century	A pair of houses in pink brick on a partial plinth, with a ground floor sill band, and a hipped slate roof. There are two storeys and eight bays, the right bay recessed. The windows are sashes with wedge lintels. Both doorways have fanlights, the left doorway has reeded pilasters and a reeded frieze, and the right doorway has panelled Tuscan pilasters and a panelled frieze.	II
3 Canal Road; 54.13229°N 1.51880°W		Mid-19th century	The house is in brown brick at the front and limestone at the rear, and has a slate roof. There are two storeys and three bays. The central doorway has a Tuscan surround and an oblong fanlight, and the windows are sashes with wedge lintels.	II
5–8 Coltsgate Hill; 54.13860°N 1.52494°W	—	Mid-19th century	A terrace of four houses in pink brick with a slate roof. There are three storeys and four bays. The doorways have oblong fanlights, moulded surrounds, and sunk panelled pilasters. The windows are sashes with wedge lintels.	II
20 Coltsgate Hill; 54.13898°N 1.52555°W	—	Mid-19th century	The house is in brown brick with a slate roof. There are two storeys and three bay. The central doorway has an oblong fanlight, and a moulded cornice on moulded consoles. The windows are sashes with channelled voussoirs.	II
21 Coltsgate Hill; 54.13894°N 1.52543°W	—	Mid-19th century	The house is in brown brick with a slate roof. There are two storeys and three bay. The central doorway has an oblong fanlight, and a moulded cornice on moulded consoles. The windows are sashes with channelled voussoirs.	II
2 Fishergate; 54.13684°N 1.52402°W	—	Mid-19th century	The shop is in brown brick, with a wooden modillion eaves cornice, and a hipped slate roof. There are three storeys and one bay. The ground floor contains a modern shopfront, and on the upper floors are sash windows.	II
4 Fishergate; 54.13691°N 1.52398°W	—	Mid-19th century	The shop is in brown brick, with a slate roof. There are three storeys and two bays. The ground floor contains a modern shopfront, and on the upper floors are sash windows.	II
20 Fishergate; 54.13746°N 1.52371°W	—	Mid-19th century	The shop is in brown brick, with a wooden modillion eaves cornice, and a pantile roof with coped gables. There are three storeys and two bays. On the ground floor is a modern shopfront, and the upper floors contain sash windows with stucco voussoirs and keystones.	II
14 and 15 High Skellgate; 54.13518°N 1.52526°W	—	Mid-19th century	The shop, on a corner site, is in pink brick with a slate roof. There are two storeys and two bays. On the front and left return are shopfronts with modillion cornices, pilasters with moulded panels in chevron patterns, and idiosyncratic capitals. On the front is a doorway, the upper floor contains sash windows, and all have wedge lintels.	II
35 Kirkgate; 54.13542°N 1.52249°W		Mid-19th century	The building is in colourwashed brick with a slate roof and three storeys. The ground floor has a shopfront with panelled piers, and a moulded scrolled console to a moulded cornice. The middle floor contains a canted oriel window with angle pilasters and a moulded cornice, and on the top floor are two segmental-headed sash windows in moulded surrounds with keystones.	II
41 and 42 Kirkgate; 54.13583°N 1.52291°W	—	Mid-19th century	A pair of shops, probably incorporating earlier material, in brown brick, with paired eaves brackets, and a pantile roof with a coped gable. There are three storeys and two bays. On the ground floor are two shopfronts with panelled pilasters, and fascias on scrolled consoles. On the left bay on the middle floor is a canted oriel window with depressed-arched sash windows, and ornament in the spandrels. To the right is a tripartite sash window, and the top floor contains two sash windows.	II
5 Low Skellgate; 54.13482°N 1.52579°W	—	Mid-19th century	The building is in colourwashed brick with a pantile roof. There are two storeys and one bay. The ground floor contains an elaborate shopfront, with pilasters, elaborate carved consoles to the cornice, glazing bars, clustered pilasters with capitals and unusually carved blocks. On the upper floor is a sash window.	II
9 and 10 Low Skellgate; 54.13466°N 1.52608°W	—	Mid-19th century	A pair of houses in pink brick on a stuccoed plinth, with a slate roof. There are three storeys and three bays. In the centre are paired doorways, each doorway having a semicircular fanlight, its voussoirs with decorative carving, Tuscan pilasters with oval paterae, and a bracketed moulded cornice. The windows are sashes with channelled stucco voussoirs.	II
5 Market Place; 54.13616°N 1.52319°W		Mid-19th century (or earlier)	The two shops are stuccoed and have rusticated quoins, wooden modillion cornices, and a slate roof. There are three storeys and three bays. The ground floor contains modern shopfronts, in the left two bays of the two upper floors are canted bay windows, and on the right bay of the middle floor is a casement window.	II
10 Market Place; 54.13664°N 1.52309°W	—	Mid-19th century	The shop, at one time a hotel, is possibly older at the rear. It is roughcast, with paired eaves brackets, and a slate roof. There are four storeys and three bays. The ground floor contains a modern shopfront, and above are sash windows with raised surrounds and keystones.	II
13 Market Place; 54.13664°N 1.52309°W	—	Mid-19th century (or earlier)	A stuccoed shop with a moulded eaves cornice and a slate roof. There are three storeys and two bays. On the ground floor is a modern shopfront, and the upper floors contain sash windows, those on the middle floor being tripartite. On the roof are two gabled dormers.	II
20 Market Place; 54.13681°N 1.52380°W	—	19th century	The shop on a corner site is in red brick, with a moulded box cornice and a slate roof. There are three storeys, and a front of two bays. The ground floor contains a modern shopfront, and on the upper floors are sash windows with wedge lintels.	II
24 and 25 Market Place; 54.13663°N 1.52414°W	—	Mid-19th century	A pair of shop in brown brick with a wooden dentilled eaves cornice and a slate roof. There are three storeys and three bays. The ground floor contains two modern shopfronts flanking a passage entry, and above are sash windows with channelled wedge lintels and keystones.	II
30 and 31 Market Place; 54.13640°N 1.52431°W		Mid-19th century	A house and a shop in red brick, with paired wooden brackets to the eaves, and a slate roof. There are three storeys and four bays. The ground floor contains a shopfront with a round-arched entrance to the right, and further to the right are a sash window and a doorway. On the upper floors are sash windows, and all the windows have lintels and keystones.	II
1, 2, 3 and 4 North Street (Princess Terrace); 54.14094°N 1.52270°W		Mid-19th century	A terrace of four houses in red brick with stone dressings and a slate roof. There are three storeys, and the right end bay projects under a gable on kneelers. The ground floor contains three-light casement windows, and gabled portals with crocketed consoles containing doors with cusped arched heads. On the middle floor are alternate two-light and three-light arched windows, and the top floor has alternate flat-roofed dormers, and gables containing two-light sash windows.	II
24 and 25 North Street; 54.13877°N 1.52405°W	—	Mid-19th century	A shop and a house, they are stuccoed, and have a slate roof. There are two storeys and three bays. On the left of the ground floor is a modern shopfront, and to its right is a doorway and a window. The windows on both floors are sashes with channelled stucco voussoirs.	II
43 North Street; 54.14000°N 1.52428°W	—	Mid-19th century	The house is in painted brick with a slate roof. There are two storeys and two bays. The right bay contains a two-storey canted bay window with panels between the storeys. To the left is a doorway in a reeded frame and with an oblong fanlight, and above is a sash window with a segmental head.	II
62, 63, and 64 North Street; 54.13915°N 1.52449°W	—	Mid-19th century	Two shops in pink brick, with a roof of pantile on the left and slate on the right. There are three storeys and three bays. On the left of the ground floor is a shopfront, probably contemporary, with Tuscan pilasters and a moulded wooden cornice. To its right is a round-arched passage entry, and further to the right is a wider, later shopfront with fluted tapering pilasters, moulded consoles, shaped spandrels, and recessed central double doors. On the middle floor are three canted oriel windows, and the top floor contains sash windows.	II
76 North Street; 54.13820°N 1.52396°W	—	Mid-19th century	The shop is in brown brick, with a wooden modillion eaves cornice and a slate roof. There are three storeys and three bays. The right bay contains a contemporary shopfront, to its left is a doorway with a moulded surround and a dentilled pediment on scrolled reeded consoles, and further to the left is a wide sash window. On the upper floors are sash windows with channelled stucco voussoirs.	II
2 Old Market Place; 54.13720°N 1.52297°W		19th century (or earlier)	The shop is clad in artificial stone, and has three storeys and two bays. On the ground floor is a mid-19th-century shopfront with panelled pilasters and fluted scrolled consoles, and the upper floors contain sash windows.	II
9, 10 and 11 Old Market Place; 54.13737°N 1.52339°W	—	Mid-19th century	A shop in whitewashed brick, with paired brackets to the eaves, three storeys and four bays. The ground floor contains a late 19th-century shopfront that has slender partly fluted glazing bars with Composite capitals, and moulded spandrels. The doorway is recessed, and at the ends are pilasters with fluted and scrolled consoles. On the upper floors are sash windows with channelled stucco voussoirs.	II
33 and 35 Palace Road; 54.14474°N 1.52738°W	—	Mid-19th century	A pair of houses in red brick with stone dressings, floor bands, and a hipped roof. There are two storeys and four bays, and three-storey towers with pyramidal roofs on the side elevations. Each outer bay contains a projecting two-story gabled porch in which steps approach a round-arched doorway with moulded jambs, a fanlight, voussoirs, and richly sculpted keystones and impost bands, and above it is a round-arched sash window. The other windows are segmental-arched sashes, and the towers have paired round-headed sash windows on the top floor.	II
54 Palace Road; 54.14486°N 1.52870°W	—	Mid-19th century	The house is in red brick with stone dressings, quoins, deeply overhanging eaves and a hipped slate roof. There are two storeys, and fronts of three bays. On the front is an Ionic porch with an entablature. It is flanked by canted bay windows with moulded cornices, and the other windows are sashes.	II
6 Park Street; 54.13641°N 1.52689°W	—	Mid-19th century	The house is stuccoed, and has a wooden moulded eaves cornice, and a stone slate roof. There are three storeys and two bays. The right bay contains a three-storey canted bow window with ornamental cornices. On the ground floor of the left bay is a porch with two slender Tuscan columns, and a recessed doorway with a semicircular fanlight, pilasters and moulded scrolled consoles. Above this are two blind panels, a sash window flanked by half-columns, and a sash window in a recessed round arch.	II
7 and 8 Park Street; 54.13638°N 1.52712°W		Mid-19th century	The house is in stone with a coved eaves cornice. There are three storeys and three bays, the middle bay projecting slightly under a pediment. The central doorway has an oblong fanlight, and is flanked by columns, sash side lights and Tuscan pilasters, above which is a pediment. The outer bays contain two-storey canted bay windows with moulded cornices, the left one also with Tuscan angle pilasters. The other windows are tripartite sashes with keystones. To the left is a two-storey two-bay extension containing segmental-headed sash windows, a canted oriel window, and a tripartite sash window with a rusticated surround in a depressed arch.	II
1 Princess Road and 5 North Road; 54.14106°N 1.52246°W		Mid-19th century	Two houses on a corner site, in red brick, with stone dressings, a traceried balustrade and a slate roof. There are three storeys and six bays. On the ground floor are three-light sash windows with mullions, shouldered heads, and panels above, and gabled portals with crocketed consoles and shields in the tympana. On the middle floor are sash windows with two and three arched lights, mullions, and relieving arches with hood moulds. The top floor has flat-topped semi-dormers, alternating with gabled semi-dormers. On the North Street front is a canted bay window.	II
7 Queen Street; 54.13717°N 1.52329°W	—	Mid-19th century	The shop is in brown brick, and has three storeys and one bay. The ground floor contains a modern shopfront and above are sash windows, the window on the middle floor with channelled stucco voussoirs.	II
8 Queen Street; 54.13714°N 1.52332°W		Mid-19th century	The shop, which has three storeys and two bays, is glazed on the lower two floors. The top floor is stuccoed, and contains two sash windows. The middle floor has a shop window containing turned mullions with moulded capitals and moulded spandrels. At the ends are fluted pilasters and fluted consoles. On the ground floor is a recessed porch with curved windows.	II
10 Queen Street; 54.13701°N 1.52337°W		Mid-19th century	The shop is in brown brick, with paired eaves brackets and a slate roof. There are three storeys and one bay. The contemporary shopfront has panelled pilasters, elaborately moulded and scrolled consoles to the moulded cornice, and fluted glazing bars with moulded capitals. The upper floors contain sash windows with channelled stucco voussoirs.	II
11 Queen Street; 54.13697°N 1.52336°W		Mid-19th century	The shop is in brown brick, with paired eaves brackets and a slate roof, hipped to the south. There are three storeys and two bays. The contemporary shopfront has panelled pilasters, elaborately moulded and scrolled consoles to the moulded cornice, and bow windows. To the right is a doorway with an oblong fanlight, a cornice and a pediment, and the upper floors contain sash windows with channelled stucco voussoirs.	II
1 The Crescent; 54.14041°N 1.52421°W	—	Mid-19th century	The house is in chequered brick, with quoins and a hipped slate roof. There are two storeys and three bays. The central doorway has pilasters and a semicircular fanlight, and the windows are sashes in architraves.	II
2 The Crescent; 54.14044°N 1.52456°W	—	Mid-19th century	The house is in red brick, with Ionic corner pilasters, deeply projecting eaves and a hipped slate roof. There are two storeys and three bays. In the centre is a doorway with enriched pilasters and a semicircular fanlight, on the left is a two-storey canted bay window, and to the right is a single-storey oblong bay window with a cast iron balcony. The other upper floor bays contain sash windows, and on the roof is a gabled dormer with decorative bargeboards.	II
3 The Crescent; 54.14037°N 1.52487°W	—	Mid-19th century	The house is in brown brick with quoins and a hipped slate roof. There are two storeys and three bays. In the centre of the ground floor is a porch with two columns, flanked by oblong bay windows, all under a cornice with heavy consoles. The upper floor contains sash windows with wedge lintels, in front is a full-width decorative cast iron balustrade, and on the roof is a flat-roofed dormer.	II
4 and 5 The Crescent; 54.14033°N 1.52515°W	—	Mid-19th century	A pair of houses in red brick with stone sill bands and a hipped slate roof. There are three storeys and five bays, with a broken pediment over the middle bay. The outer bays contain porches with square piers, between which are two canted bay windows. The upper floors contain sash windows in moulded architraves, and above the ground floor is a full-width decorative cast iron balustrade.	II
6 and 7 The Crescent; 54.14035°N 1.52547°W	—	Mid-19th century	A pair of houses in red brick with stone sill bands and a hipped slate roof. There are three storeys and four bays. The outer bays contain doorways with panelled pilasters, round heads with fanlights, and decorative cornices. Between them are canted bay windows surmounted by balustrades. The other windows have elaborative architraves. The windows on the middle floor are round-headed with carved swags in spandrels, and with segmental pediments on scrolled brackets.	II
8 and 9 The Crescent; 54.14045°N 1.52572°W	—	Mid-19th century	A pair of houses in red brick with stone sill bands and a hipped slate roof. There are three storeys and four bays. The outer bays contain doorways with panelled pilasters, round heads with fanlights, and decorative cornices. Between them are canted bay windows surmounted by balustrades. The other windows have elaborative architraves. The windows on the middle floor are round-headed with carved swags in spandrels, and with segmental pediments on scrolled brackets.	II
10 The Crescent; 54.14064°N 1.52583°W	—	Mid-19th century	The house is in red brick, with a floor band, a dentilled stone eaves cornice and a hipped slate roof. There are two storeys and three bays. The central doorway has attached Ionic columns, and is flanked by canted bay windows with dentilled cornices. The upper floor contains segment-headed sash windows in moulded stone surrounds.	II
11 and 12 The Crescent; 54.14082°N 1.52577°W	—	Mid-19th century	A pair of houses in red brick with a hipped slate roof. There are two storeys and five bays. On the front are two doorways with rectangular fanlights. The outer bays contain square bay windows with moulded stone cornices, and on the upper floor are sash windows with wedge lintels.	II
6 and 6A Water Skellgate; 54.13507°N 1.52409°W	—	Mid-19th century	A pair of houses in pink brick with a slate roof. There are two storeys and three bays. On the right bay is a doorway and a passage doorway to the right, both with fluted pilasters, and with an oblong fanlight, and both under a moulded cornice. The doorway in the left bay has an oblong fanlight, and the windows are sashes.	II
Albion Terrace; 54.14208°N 1.51562°W		Mid-19th century	A row of three houses in brown brick with a floor band. There are two storeys, six bays, and three shaped gables. The ground floor contains three doorways with oblong fanlights, and to the left of each is a canted bay window with angle pilasters and moulded cornices. On the upper floor are sash windows.	II
Clova; 54.13686°N 1.53406°W		Mid-19th century	A house in brown brick, with overhanging eaves and a hipped slate roof. There are two storeys and three bays, the middle bay projecting slightly. The central doorway has a Tuscan frame and moulded panelled reveals. This is flanked by canted bay windows, on the upper floor are segmental-headed windows, and on the roof is a segmental-headed dormer.	II
Gate piers, Clova; 54.13642°N 1.53304°W	—	Mid-19th century	The gate piers flanking the entrance to the drive are stuccoed and panelled. Each pier has a moulded cornice and a pyramidal cap.	II
Crescent Lodge; 54.14007°N 1.52428°W		Mid-19th century	The house is in brown brick, with a wooden bracketed eaves cornice. There are three storeys and three bays. In the centre are paired doorways in a common surround, with semicircular fanlights, pilasters and a dentilled cornice. These are flanked by canted bay windows, and the other windows are sashes with wedge lintels.	II
Freemantle Terrace; 54.14266°N 1.51916°W		Mid-19th century	A terrace of five houses in red brick with stone dressings and a slate roof. There are two storeys, semi-basements and attics, and ten bays; on the ground floor they are alternately canted and oblong. Steps with cast iron balustrades lead up to the doorways, which alternate between being arched with triple chamfers and fanlights with glazing bars, and being oblong with double chamfers and mullioned fanlights. The widows are mullioned and transomed casements, and in the attics are dormers with gables or pediments.	II
Highfield; 54.14301°N 1.52802°W		Mid-19th century	The house is in stone, with two storeys and attics with shaped gables. On the front is a porte cochère with three round arches, channelled stone voussoirs and taller keystones. The windows are casements with mullions and transoms. To the right is a three-storey tower with a flat roof, containing a moulded cornice on paired brackets, and a semicircular oriel window. On the south front are two two-storey oblong bay windows.	II
Gate piers, Highfield; 54.14314°N 1.52564°W		Mid-19th century	The gate piers at the entrance to the drive are in rusticated stone. Each pier has a raised ornamental patterned frieze, and a moulded cornice to a pyramidal cap surmounted by an ornamental urn.	II
Lodge to Highfield; 54.14300°N 1.52560°W	—	Mid-19th century	The lodge is in stone, and has steep pitched ornamental slate roofs, and coped gables with ornamental stone urns on the kneelers and at the apex. There is a single storey and attics. The windows are sashes with two lights and mullions, and some have stone ornamental features above.	II
Holmefield House; 54.12869°N 1.52769°W	—	Mid-19th century	The house is in brown brick with bands, a modillion eaves cornice, and a hipped slate roof. There are two storeys and five bays, and a single-storey projection with an apse to the north. On the front is a porch with stone quoins, and a modillion and dentiled cornice. The doorway has a Tuscan surround, a semicircular fanlight, moulded imposts, and a pediment, and the windows are sashes.	II
Gates, gate piers and railings, Low Lodge; 54.13328°N 1.54132°W	—	19th century	The structures are in cast iron. The central double gates are attached to cylindrical piers about 2 metres (6 ft 7 in) in height, each with a moulded base and cornice, and a shallow cone-shaped cap. These are flanked by railings and similar piers, and attached to the left pier is a pedestrian gate.	II
Pendle House; 54.12849°N 1.51051°W	—	Mid-19th century	The house is in brown brick, with overhanging eaves and a hipped slate roof. There are two storeys and three bays. In the centre is a porch with Tuscan columns, an entablature and a blocking course, and the doorway has an oblong fanlight. This is flanked by canted bay windows with moulded cornices, and the other windows are sashes.	II
Post at entrance to snicket 54.14093°N 1.52645°W	—	Mid-19th century	The post is in cast iron, and has an octagonal Egyptian-style knop at the top.	II
Ripon Conservative Club; 54.13496°N 1.52476°W		Mid-19th century	The building is stuccoed, and has quoins and a slate roof. There are three storeys and two bays. The doorway in the left bay has Tuscan pilasters and a semicircular fanlight. To its right is a round-arched carriage entry with a moulded architrave. The windows are sashes in moulded architraves with decorative keystones.	II
Wall to the Old Court House; 54.13547°N 1.52103°W	—	19th century (or earlier)	The wall is in limestone, and incorporates medieval fragments. It contains three pointed doorways, one with moulded imposts and voussoirs, and a hood mould with nailhead decoration, and a doorway with a segmental head and fleur-de-lys decoration in the spandrels.	II
West Lodge and Crowners Close; 54.14003°N 1.53006°W	—	Mid-19th century	The house is in whitewashed brick, with a sill band, a floor band and a hipped slate roof. There are two storeys, a main block with fronts of three bays, and a five-bay extension to the west. On the front is a Tuscan porch with an entablature, and a doorway with a semicircular fanlight and moulded imposts and voussoirs. The windows are sashes.	II
Ye Hornblower Tavern; 54.13727°N 1.52297°W		Mid-19th century	Previously the Wakeman Public House, it is in colourwashed brick with a slate roof. There are three storeys and two bays. The ground floor has a pub front, including sunk-panelled pilasters under a moulded cornice on elaborately moulded consoles. On the middle floor are canted oriel windows with moulded cornices, and the top floor has sash windows with wedge lintels.	II
Sharow View; 54.13865°N 1.52242°W		1854	A workhouse, later used for other purposes, it is in brown brick, with stone dressings, quoins, and a slate roof with coped gables on cut kneelers. There are two storeys and eleven bays, the middle three bays projecting under two shaped gables with finials. The flanking wings each has one smaller shaped gable with a smaller finial. The central doorway has a four-centred arched head and a projecting surround. The windows are a mix of sashes and casements.	II
The Lodge; 54.13833°N 1.52218°W		1854	The gatehouse to the workhouse, later used for other purposes, and subsequently a museum, it is in red brick with stone dressings, quoins, a moulded string course, and a slate roof with coped gables. There are two storeys and three bays. In the centre is a carriage entry with a four-centred arch flanked by buttresses, above which is an inscribed and dated parapet. Over this is a three-light stepped mullioned window and a shaped gable. The other windows are casements. The main block is flanked by single-storey three-bay wings, the right wing extending towards the road.	II
St Wilfrid's Church; 54.13881°N 1.52591°W		1860–62	The church was designed by J. A. Hansom, and is in stone with a slate roof. The church consists of a nave with a clerestory, north and south aisles, a much taller chancel with a polygonal apse, rising to an octagon with a lucarne and iron cresting, and chancel chapels.	II*
Presbytery, St Wilfrid's Church; 54.13862°N 1.52580°W		1860–62	Designed by J. A. Hansom, the presbytery is in stone on a chamfered plinth, and has a banded slate roof with coped gables. There are two storeys and seven irregular bays. The doorway has a pointed head and is flanked by lancet windows, and above it is a three-light mullioned window. To its left is a semicircular stair tower with a conical roof. To the right is a gabled two-storey cross-wing with pairs of segmental-headed sash windows, above which is a canted oriel window with a hipped roof.	II
The Old Chapel; 54.13884°N 1.52504°W		1861	The chapel, later used for other purposes, is in brick with stone dressings, rusticated quoins, a sill band, and a pediment containing an oculus and carved foliage in the tympanum. There are two storeys, four bays on the front and six on the sides. In the centre are paired doorways, each flanked by Tuscan half-columns with an entablature, a semicircular fanlight with moulded voussoirs, imposts and a keystone. The windows are sashes, with segmental heads on the ground floor, round heads and moulded imposts on the upper floor, and all with keystones.	II
Main building, The College of Ripon and York St John; 54.14124°N 1.52793°W		1862	The college, which has been converted into flats, is in red brick on a moulded plinth, with floor bands, overhanging eaves and hipped slate roofs. The central block has three storeys and seven bays, flanked by two-storey single-bay pavilions with pyramidal roofs. The central doorway has a segmental head, a raised keystone and a segmental pediment. The windows are sashes, those on the lower two floors are paired and have segmental heads, and on the top floor they are small with single flat-headed lights.	II
29–32 High Saint Agnesgate; 54.13429°N 1.51798°W		1863	A row of four houses in pink brick with stone dressings, a string course, overhanging eaves and a steeply pitched slate roof. There are two storeys and four bays. There are four gables, and two gabled porches with pointed arches and hood moulds; all the gables have decorative bargeboards and finials. The windows are paired sashes with trefoil heads and hood moulds. On the left porch is an initialled shield, and on the right porch is the date.	II
Maltings; 54.14766°N 1.51530°W		Mid to late 19th century	The former maltings is in brown brick with a slate roof. It consists of a two-storey range with eleven bays, and a range at right angles with three storeys. Most of the openings have segmental heads, and some contain casement windows. There are loading doors, and an oriel window on cast iron brackets.	II
Chapel of St Mary Magdalene; 54.14116°N 1.51700°W	—	1868	The chapel is in limestone with a slate roof. It consists of a nave and a chancel in one unit, a timber south porch and northeast vestry. At the northwest corner is an open octagonal bell turret on a square base. On the nave are paired lancet windows, and the east window has three lights and Perpendicular tracery.	II
Chapel of St John the Baptist; 54.13288°N 1.52135°W		1869	The chapel, designed by W. H. Crossland, is in limestone with a slate roof. It consists of a nave, a south porch, a chancel with a polygonal apse, and a vestry with a hipped roof. On the west gable is corbelled-out bellcote. At the west end is a four-light Early English window, and the other windows are in Perpendicular style.	II
St Anne's Almshouses; 54.13383°N 1.52002°W		1869	The almshouses are in brown brick with stone dressings, pink brick string courses, and a slate roof. There is one storey and four bays. In the centre is a gable with two blind lights framing an inscribed marble panel. Each house has a doorway with a shouldered lintel and a circular fanlight, above which is a coped gable on paired cut corbels. The windows are paired pointed sashes with hood moulds.	II
11 Fishergate; 54.13717°N 1.52363°W	—	Late 19th century	The shop, on a corner site, has a framed internal construction, and the front and left return are almost completely glazed. There are two storeys, the corner is canted, there is weatherboarding between the storeys, and the rear is in red brick. The windows are arched, and have slender glazing bars with tiny Composite capitals.	II
14 North Street; 54.13823°N 1.52375°W		Late 19th century	The shop is in red brick with stone dressings, and the front is decorated with yellow and black brick chequered bands over the upper floor windows and at impost level. There are three storeys, two bays, and a crow-stepped gable with a carved stone finial. The ground floor contains an arcade of four pointed arches, the outer two with doors, and the inner two with windows. On the upper floors are sash windows with arched heads and decorated tympani, two double windows on the middle floor and a triple window on the top floor.	II
Bandstand; 54.13556°N 1.52853°W		Late 19th century	The bandstand in Spa Gardens is in cast iron on a brick plinth, with stone dressings, and has an octagonal plan. The piers have Composite capitals and elaborate spandrels. The roof has a fretwork valance, cast iron cresting over the eaves, and a cast iron corona in the centre. Around the bandstand is a balustrade with Art Nouveau balusters.	II
Sewer Gas Lamp; 54.13758°N 1.52081°W		Late 19th century	The lamp, that burnt sewer gas as a fuel, is in cast iron, and has a tall base and a fluted column, with a capital, and iron brackets carrying a circular glazed lamp with a domed top and a ventilator.	II
Hospital of St John the Baptist; 54.13306°N 1.52089°W		1878	The almshouses are in brown brick, with string courses in red brick, voussoirs in black brick, and a tile roof. There is a single storey, and on the front are three gabled projections with applied timber framing, the end ones larger, and all have attached porches. The doorways are in segmental-arched openings, the windows in the gables are casements, and elsewhere they are sashes with arched heads.	II
Former Opera House; 54.13492°N 1.52506°W		1885	At one time the Victoria Hall, later used for other purposes, it is in whitewashed brick, with bracketed eaves and a slate roof. There are two storeys and five bays, and a single-bay extension to the right of the same height with three storeys. In the centre are three round arches, the middle one containing a doorway and the others with windows, and the other windows are sash windows. On the extension is a recessed doorway with an oblong fanlight.	II
Almshouses of Hospital of St Mary Magdalene; 54.14071°N 1.51600°W		1892	The almshouses are in stone, and have moulded coped gables, with kneelers, and finials on the kneelers and gables. There is one storey, and the doorways have Tudor arched heads and hood moulds. The windows have chamfered mullions and contain sashes.	II
Bondgate Bridge; 54.13319°N 1.52185°W		1892	The bridge carries King Street over the River Skell, and consists of a single iron lattice-girder span. There are four stone piers with pyramidal and embattled tops, and traceried panelled sides with coats of arms, one carrying an inscription and the date. The approach to the bridge has cast iron railings with fleur-de-lys and spear finials, and plain stone piers at their ends.	II
Victoria Clock Tower; 54.14131°N 1.52277°W		1897	The clock tower was built to commemorate the Diamond Jubilee of Queen Victoria. It is in stone and has three stages, the top stage containing clock faces. On the south front is a doorway with a pointed arch, and above it is a statue of Queen Victoria on a corbel. At the top is an ogee crown of eight ribs with a pinnacle at base of each, surmounted by a metal crown.	II
Ripon Spa Baths; 54.13613°N 1.52748°W		1904–05	The swimming baths have an elaborately decorated front in red brick, with orange moulded terracotta dressings and a slate roof. The centre has two storeys and projects as a porte cochère. The flanking wings have one storey, with four bays to the east and three to the west, containing mullioned and transomed windows.	II
Gate piers, Ripon Spa Baths; 54.13614°N 1.52791°W		1904–05	The gate piers to the west of the baths are in moulded terracotta. They have fluted pilasters in the lower part, diagonally placed buttresses above, and are arched to support domed finials.	II
Former sorting office 54.13866°N 1.52401°W		1906	The Post Office sorting office, later used for other purposes, has a ground floor in stone, the upper floor in red brick, and a slate mansard roof. On the front are a floor band containing moulded bosses, and a modillion eaves cornice. There are two storeys and attics, and four bays. To the left of the ground floor are two doorways with oblong fanlights, the right one also with a segment-shaped hood suspended by cast iron braces. To the right of these are three windows; all the ground floor openings have jambs and voussoirs, alternately plain and moulded. The upper floor contains sash windows with double keystones, and in the attics are four flat-topped dormers with moulded cornices and angle pilasters.	II
Cabmen's Shelter; 54.13613°N 1.52348°W		1911	The shelter is a prefabricated timber building with an eaves cornice, and an overhanging hipped shingled roof with small gablets. It is on a low, small-wheeled steel chassis, now fixed. There is a single storey, and fronts of three and four bays divided by decorative pilasters. At the south end is a doorway, and along the sides are windows, below which are panels. Above these windows is a balustrade of small windows.	II
Statue of the First Marquess of Ripon; 54.13599°N 1.52815°W		1912	The statue in Spa Gardens by Francis Derwent Wood depicts George Robinson, 1st Marquess of Ripon. The figure is in bronze, standing in an informal pose, wearing court dress and the robes of the Order of the Garter. This stands on a stone plinth on two steps. It has inscribed concave panels on the front and rear, and on the sides are scrolled consoles and swags.	II
War memorial 54.13586°N 1.52800°W		Early 20th century	The war memorial in Spa Gardens consists of a stone obelisk on a moulded base. It is surmounted by a bust of a soldier in lead.	II
Former office building, Williamson's Works; 54.13403°N 1.52628°W		1925	The building is in red brick with terracotta dressings, outer pilasters, and a hipped tile roof. There are two storeys and attics, and the south front has nine bays. Over the middle three bays is a gable, and they are flanked by painted pilasters with moulded coping. Above the windows in both floors are painted inscribed panels, and in the gable is a Diocletian window with an ornate keystone. The outer bays have a central two-storey canted bay window, and above are double dormers. The west front has two bays with a gable over the middle two bays, flanked by pilasters, and with a Diocletian window in the gable flanked by tall chimneys.	II
1 Market Place; 54.13593°N 1.52318°W		Early 20th century	An office building on a corner site, in stone on a plinth, the ground floor rusticated, with floor bands, a moulded eaves cornice and a blocking course. There are three storeys, two bays on Market Place and three on Kirkgate. The ground floor contains doorways and windows with round-arched heads, moulded imposts and triple keystones. On the upper floors are sash windows, those on the middle floor with triangular pediments on long fluted consoles, and on the top floor with plain raised frames and keystones.	II
Former Midland Bank; 54.13604°N 1.52476°W		Early 20th century	The bank building, on a corner site, is in stone, and has a modillion eaves cornice and a parapet. There is one storey, six bays on Skellgate, two on Westgate, and a curved corner with three bays. On the corner are four fluted Tuscan columns on a horizontally channelled plinth. The doorway has a plain surround and a decorative overdoor, and is flanked by small windows. The sides contain tall windows with moulded frames, keystones, and panels beneath. In the upper parts of the sides and corners are circular windows with keystones, and on the Westgate front is a round-arched passage entry.	II
Telephone kiosks 54.13620°N 1.52346°W		1935	The four telephone kiosks in Market Place are of the K6 type designed by Giles Gilbert Scott. Constructed in cast iron with a square plan and a dome, they have three unperforated crowns in the top panels.	II
