= Victoria Clock Tower, Ripon =

Structure in Ripon, North Yorkshire, England

Coordinates: 54°08′29″N 1°31′22″W

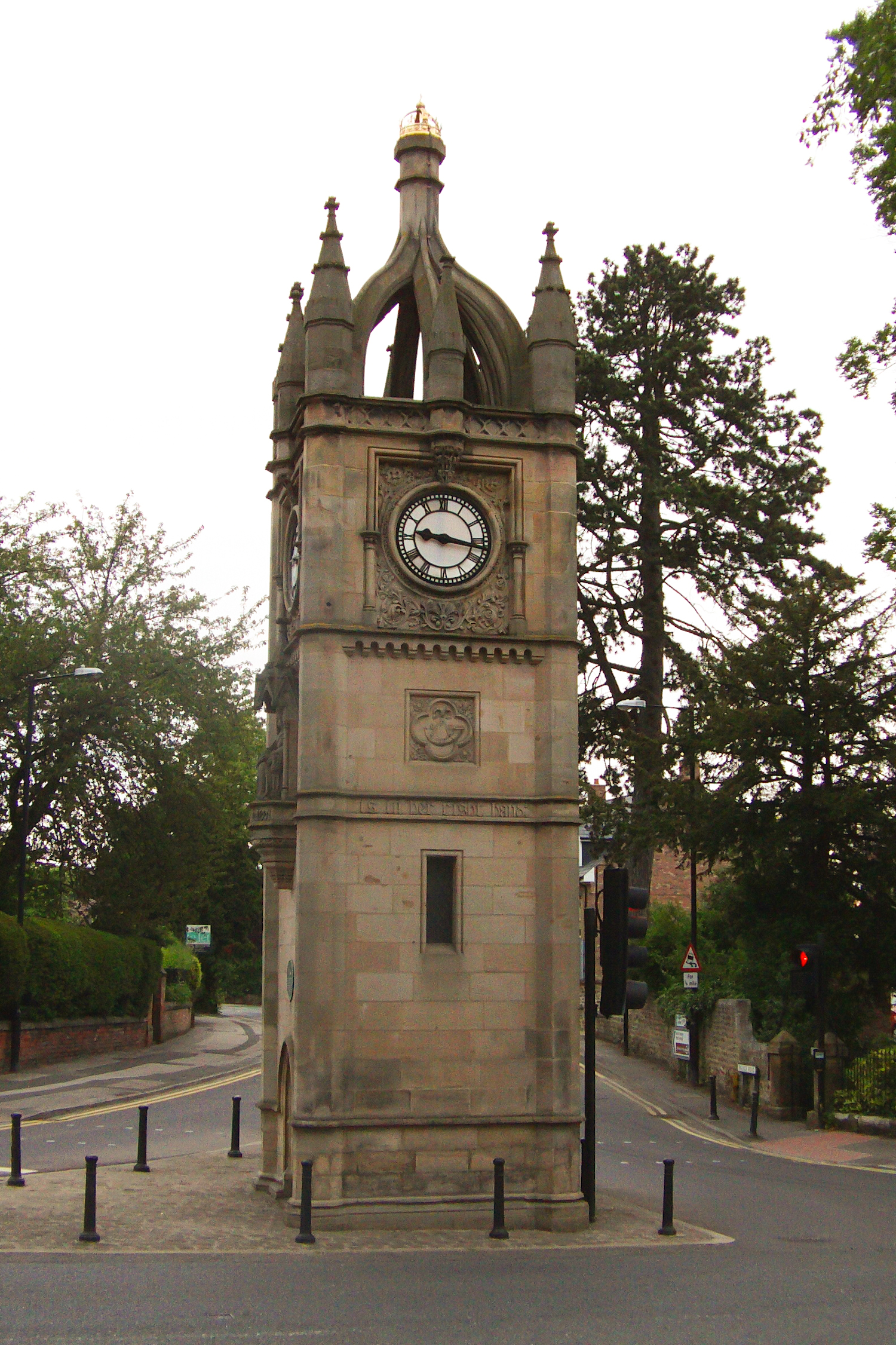
The building, in 2009

The Victoria Clock Tower is a historic structure in Ripon, a city in North Yorkshire, in England.

The clock tower was built in 1897, to commemorate the Diamond Jubilee of Queen Victoria. It was paid for by Frances and Constance Cross. It was placed at the junction of North Road, Palace Road and Princess Road, to serve as a landmark on the route from Ripon railway station to the city centre. The structure was grade II listed in 1949. It is owned by the district council.

The tower is built of stone and has three stages, the top stage containing four clock faces. On the south front is a doorway with a pointed arch, and above it is a statue of Queen Victoria on a corbel. At the top is an ogee crown of eight ribs with a pinnacle at base of each, surmounted by a metal crown.

== See also ==
- Listed buildings in Ripon
