= St Mary Magdalene's Almshouses =

Building in Ripon, North Yorkshire, England

Coordinates: 54°08′27″N 1°30′58″W

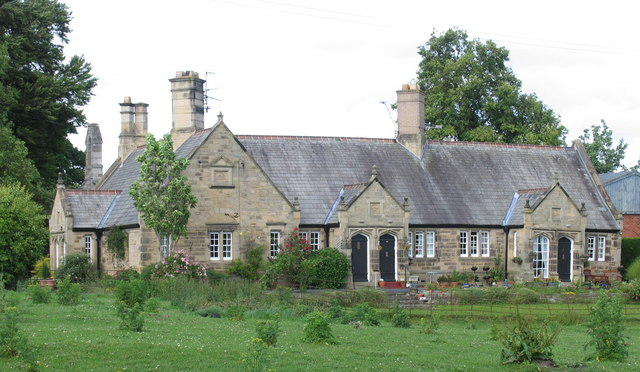
The building, in 2008

St Mary Magdalene's Almshouses is a historic building in Ripon, a city in North Yorkshire, in England.

The almshouse is reputed to have been founded in the 12th century by Thurstan, Archbishop of York, to accommodate lepers and blind priests. In the mid 14th century, the leper house was demolished, and the building was used to accommodate homeless and sick people. In 1674, everything but the Chapel of St Mary Magdalen was demolished and a new almshouse constructed. In 1868, a new chapel was built across the road, followed in 1875 by neighbouring almshouses, designed by George Mallinson. In 1892, the old almshouse was demolished and a replacement built, again to designs by Mallinson. The building was grade II listed in 1949. It was refurbished in 1976, the work including the provision of indoor toilets.

The almshouses are built of stone, and have moulded coped gables, with kneelers, and finials on the kneelers and gables. There is one storey, and the doorways have Tudor arched heads and hood moulds. The windows have chamfered mullions and contain sashes.

The former chapel is also grade II listed and is built of limestone with a slate roof. It consists of a nave and a chancel in one unit, a timber south porch and northeast vestry. At the northwest corner is an open octagonal bell turret on a square base. On the nave are paired lancet windows, and the east window has three lights and Perpendicular tracery.

== See also ==
- Listed buildings in Ripon
