= 27 Kirkgate =

Building in Ripon, North Yorkshire, England

Coordinates: 54.1352°N 1.5219°W

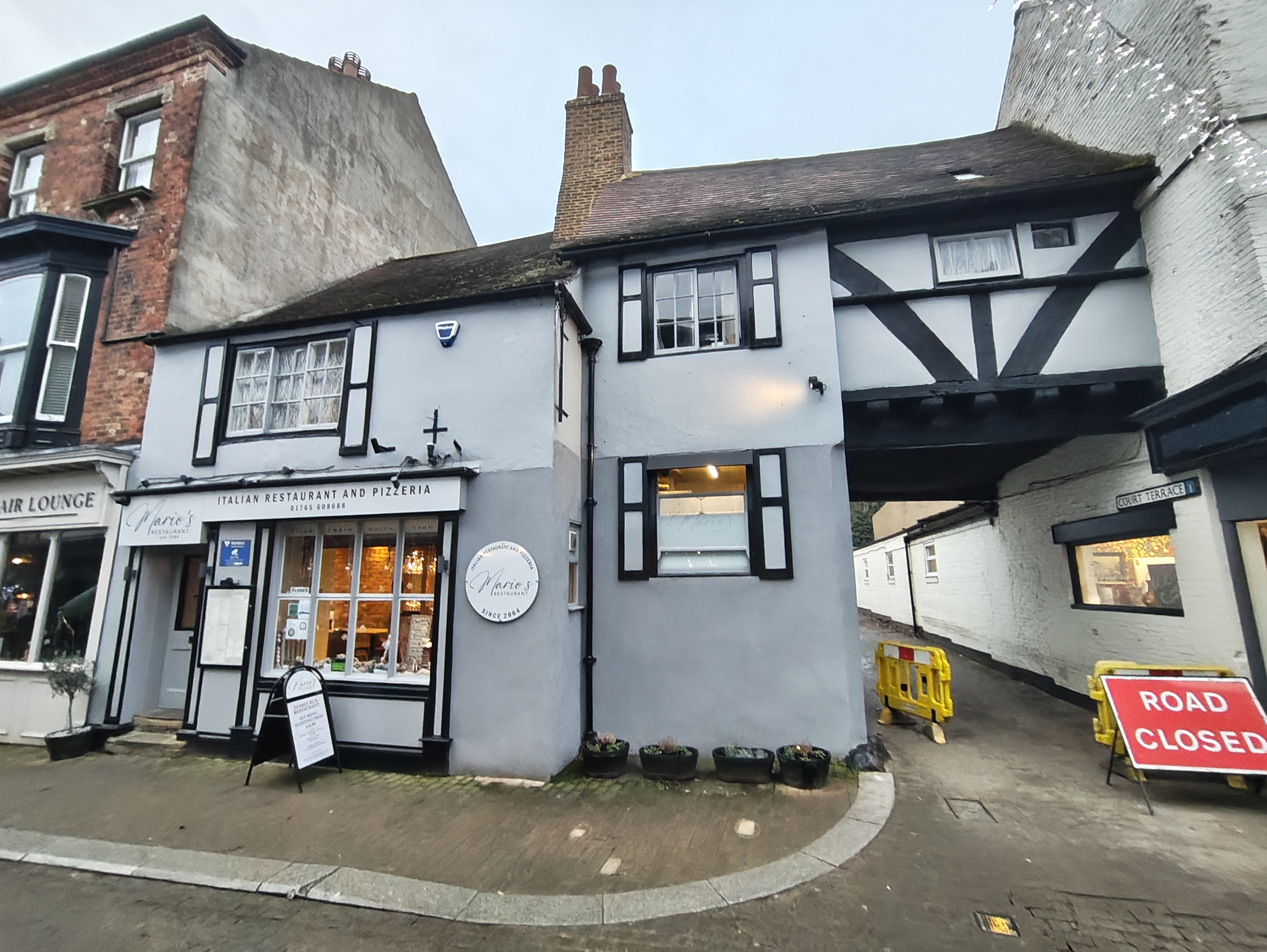
The building, in 2016

27 Kirkgate, also known as the Archbishop's Gatehouse, is a historic building in Ripon, a city in North Yorkshire, in England.

The building was constructed in the mid 15th century, as a gatehouse to the palace of the Archbishop of York. It was built in two sections, each forming a separate house, although these were later combined. Its western front, onto Kirkgate, was originally jettied, but in the 18th century the ground floor was extended to give a flat facade. The building was grade II listed in 1949. In the second half of the 20th century, it was the Black Cat Cafe, and has more recently been used as a restaurant.

The building has a timber framed core, and is stuccoed on the exterior. It has two storeys, the left part has one bay, and contains a mid-19ath century shopfront with panelled pilasters, roundels and a cornice, and above is a horizontally sliding sash window. The right part has two narrow bays, the right bay with a carriage entrance and a small window above. On the left bay are sash windows, the upper one horizontally sliding.

== See also ==
- Listed buildings in Ripon
