= St John the Baptist's Chapel, Ripon =

Church in Ripon, North Yorkshire, England

Coordinates: 54.1328°N 1.5214°W

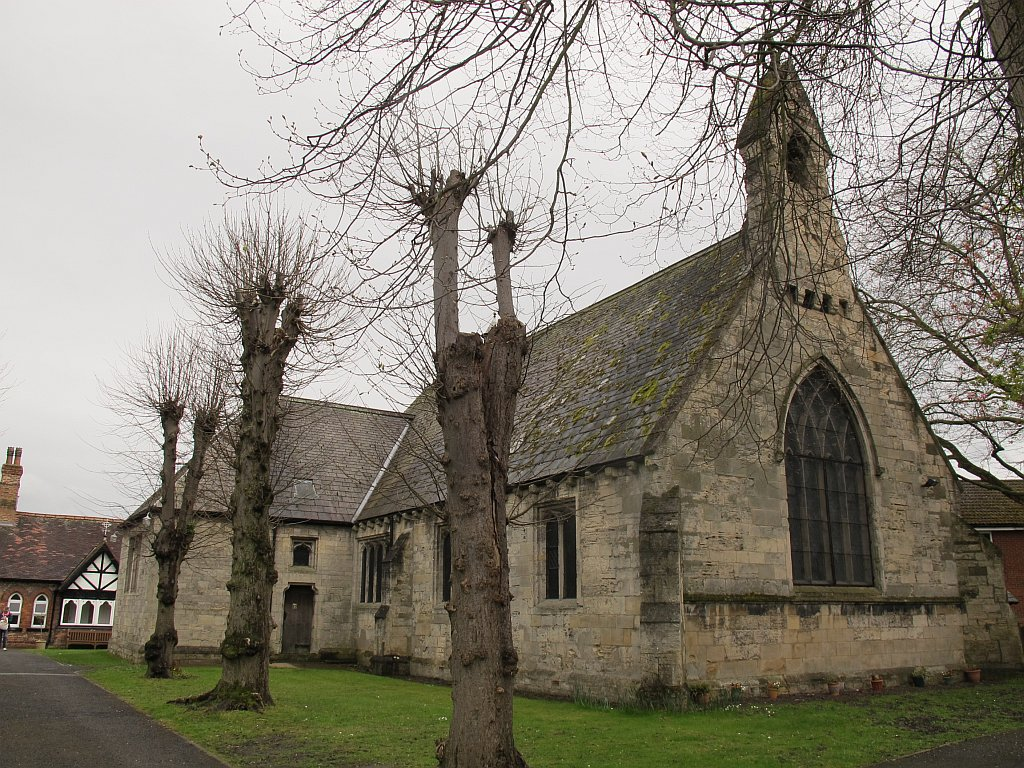
The chapel, in 2016

St John the Baptist's Chapel is a chapel of ease in Ripon, a city in North Yorkshire, in England.

St John's Almshouses, Ripon were founded in about 1110. Their chapel became disused in 1722, and from 1812 to 1854, it was used to house a school. The chapel then fell into ruin, and new almshouses were built. In 1868, William Henry Crossland designed a replacement chapel, on the site of the Mediaeval building. It had a capacity of 200 worshippers, and cost £1,200. The building was grade II listed in 1949. In the 21st century, the building was reordered, the fixed pews removed, and new heating and lighting installed.

The chapel is built of limestone with a slate roof. It consists of a nave, a south porch, a chancel with a polygonal apse, and a vestry with a hipped roof. On the west gable is corbelled-out bellcote. At the west end is a four-light Early English window, and the other windows are in Perpendicular style.

== See also ==
- Listed buildings in Ripon
