= Ripon Cabmen's Shelter =

Structure in Ripon, North Yorkshire, England

Coordinates: 54°08′10″N 1°31′24″W

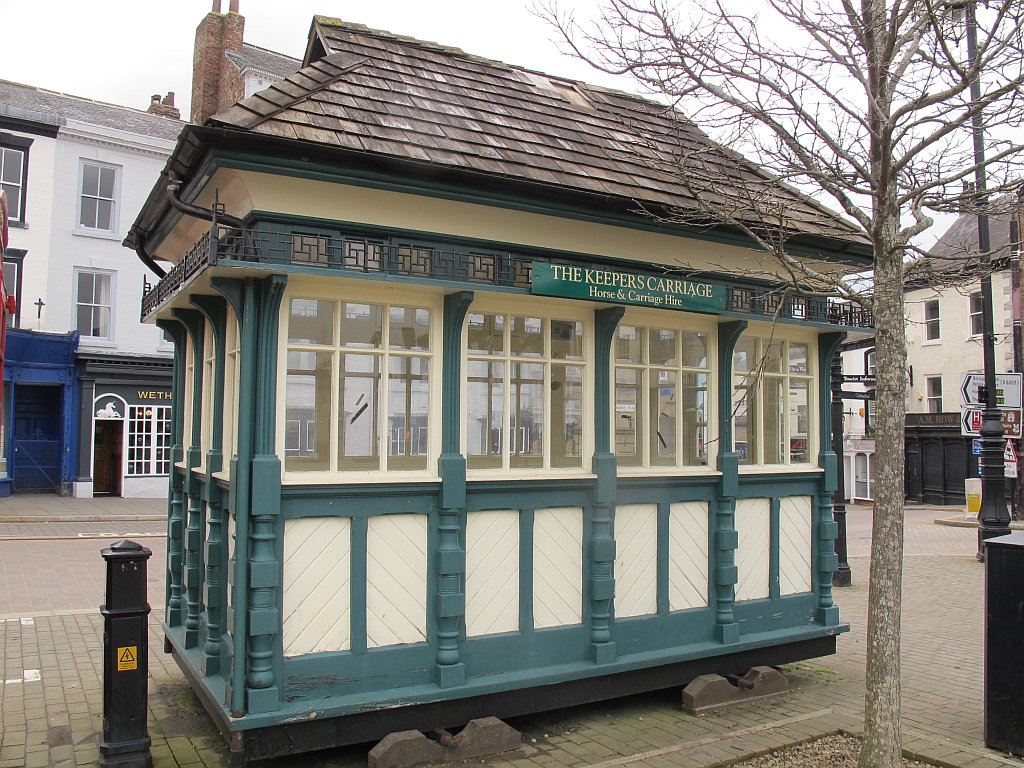
The structure, in 2016

Ripon Cabmen's Shelter is a historic structure in Ripon, a city in North Yorkshire, in England.

The prefabricated building constructed by Boulton and Paul was completed in 1911. The work cost £200, which was paid for by Sarah Carter, and was used by drivers of horse-drawn cabs who were waiting for fares. It is in the city's Market Place, where it is a prominent structure, used as a meeting point for ghost tours. In 1980, the Royal Engineers lifted it and mounted it on wheels so it could be moved for restoration. In 1982, it was donated to Ripon Civic Society, who in 1999 passed it to Ripon City Council. It was most recently restored in 2018. It has been grade II listed since 2009.

The shelter is constructed of timber building with an eaves cornice, and an overhanging hipped shingled roof with small gablets. It is on a low, small-wheeled steel chassis, now fixed. It has a single storey, and fronts of three and four bays divided by decorative pilasters. At the south end is a doorway, and along the sides are windows, below which are panels. Above these windows is a balustrade of small windows.

== See also ==
- Listed buildings in Ripon
