= Black Swan, Ripon =

Pub in Ripon, North Yorkshire, England

Coordinates: 54°08′10″N 1°31′33″W

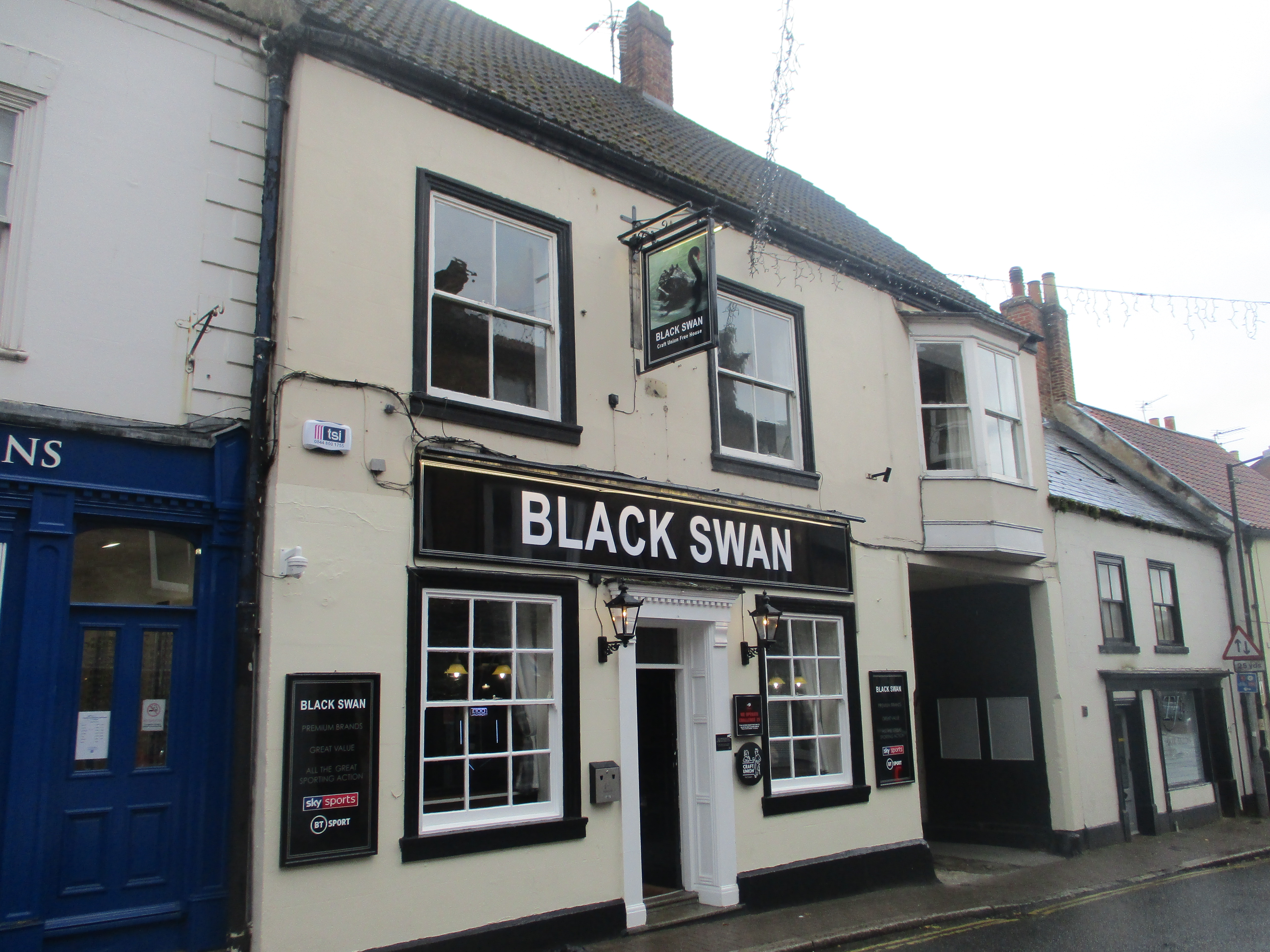
The pub, in 2020

The Black Swan is a historic pub in Ripon, a city in North Yorkshire, in England.

The building lies on Westgate, in the city centre. It is uncertain when it was built, but it was constructed in or before the mid 19th century. The roof was replaced in the 20th century, and the building was grade II listed in 1970. Two stories of ghosts are associated with the pub: one of a blacksmith, said to have had a smithy to the rear of the building; and the other of an unseen ghost said to apply suffocating pressure to guests in bed.

The pub is stuccoed, and has wooden gutter brackets and a pantile roof. There are two storeys and three bays. The right bay has a carriage entry, over which is a canted oriel window. The doorway has a plain surround, panelled reveals, an oblong fanlight and a dentilled cornice on corbels, and the windows are sashes. Inside, it has a large front bar with an old fireplace, then a smaller back bar, both with access to an L-shaped serving area; then steep steps down to a further seating area with dartboards, and also toilets.

== See also ==
- Listed buildings in Ripon
