= Minster House =

House in Ripon, North Yorkshire, England

Coordinates: 54°08′04″N 1°31′15″W

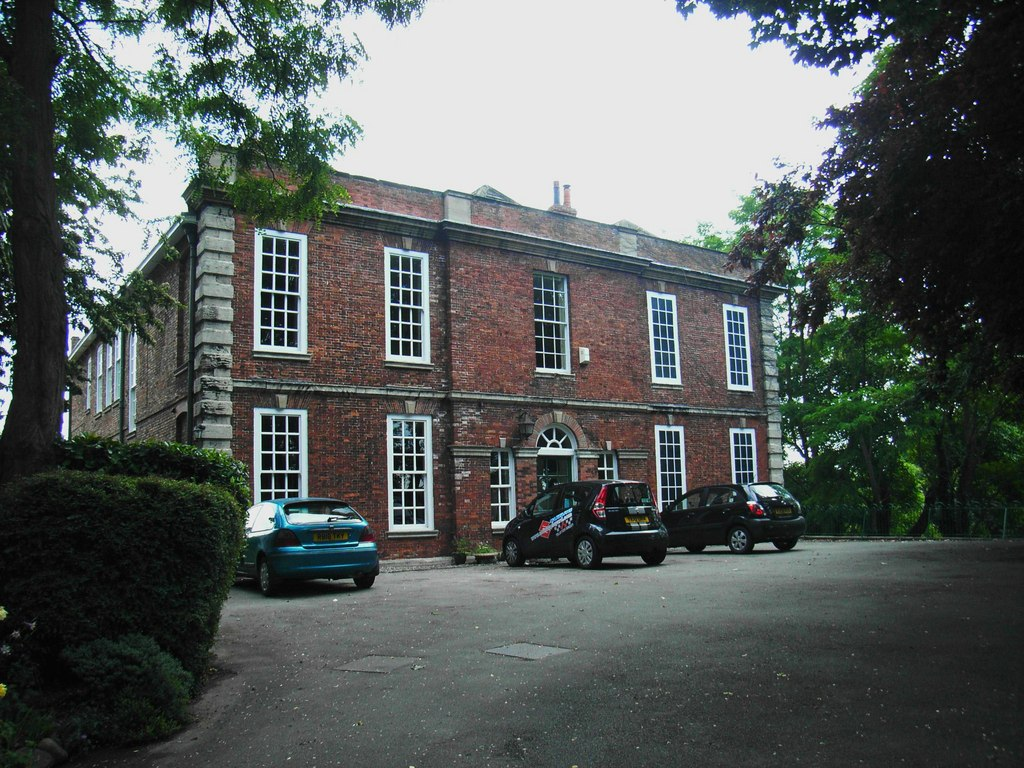
The building, in 2010

Minster House is a historic building in Ripon, a city in North Yorkshire, in England.

The house may lie on the site of the Bedern, the college of vicars of Ripon Minster. This was built in 1414 and dissolved in 1547, following which there was a failed proposal to use the building as a theological college. The current building was constructed in the early 18th century, when it was known as "The Hall". In the 19th century, the house was owned by the Oxley family, who erected their shield of arms over the main door. In 1945, it was purchased by the diocese to become the residence of the Dean of Ripon. The building was grade II* listed in 1949.

The house is built of red brick, with stone quoins, a floor band and a parapet. It has two storeys, a south front of seven bays, a west front of five bays, and two slightly projecting bays on the east front. In the centre of the south front is a doorway with a broken pediment containing a coat of arms. The windows are tall sashes with moulded sills and keystones. Inside is what Historic England describes as a "very fine staircase", and early wood panelling and fireplaces. In one room there is wainscotting dated to about 1600, which is believe to have come from Markington Hall.

== See also ==
- Grade II* listed buildings in North Yorkshire (district)
- Listed buildings in Ripon
