= Holy Trinity Church, Ripon =

Church in Ripon, North Yorkshire, England

Coordinates: 54.1380°N 1.5284°W

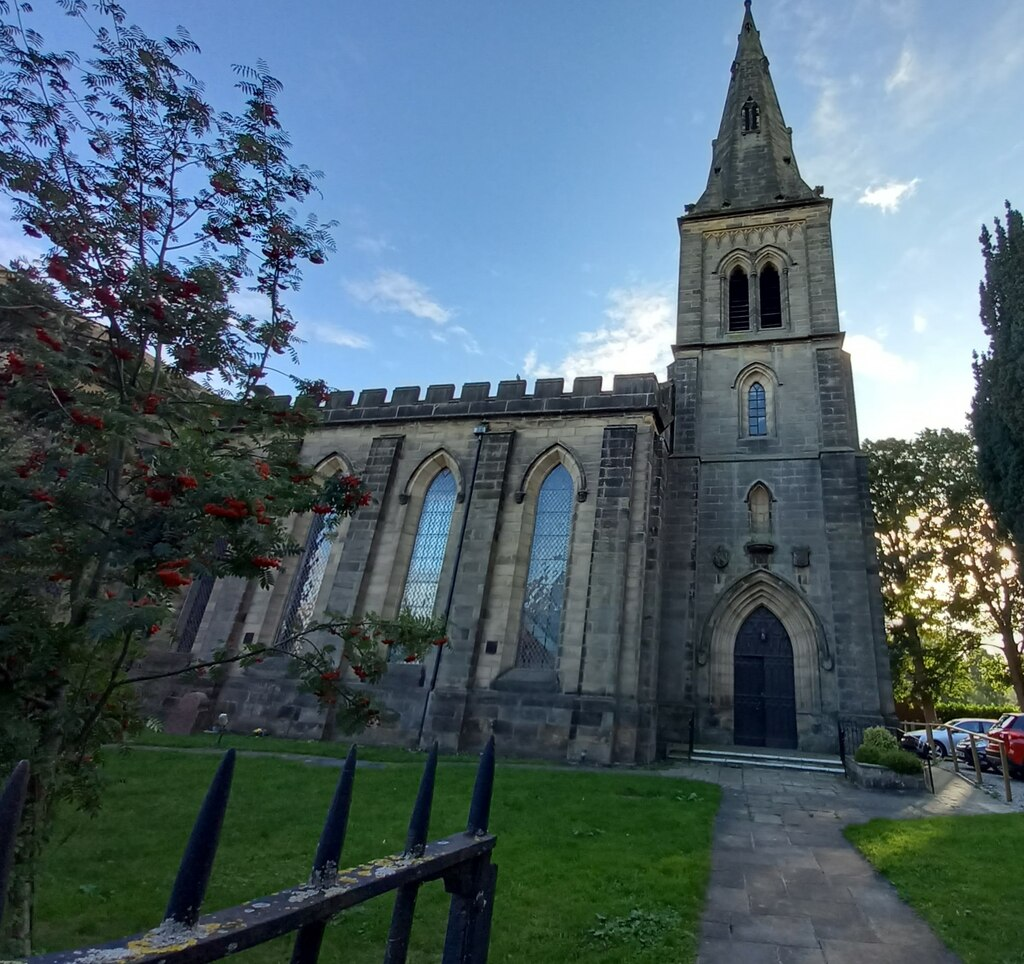
The building, in 2022

Holy Trinity Church is an Anglican church in Ripon, a city in North Yorkshire, in England.

The church was constructed between 1826 and 1827, to a design by Thomas Taylor. It was funded by a £13,000 bequest left by Thomas Kilvington, a local doctor. In 1873, it was internally reordered and could then accommodate 900 worshippers. The building was altered in 1876, and again in 1884, and has been internally reordered. It was grade II listed in 1949. The Ripon Millenary is critical of its design, but states that "the tower is the most tolerable portion, and forms a conspicuous object at a considerable distance".

The church is built of stone, with a vaulted brick crypt. It consists of a nave, north and south transepts, a chancel and a west steeple. The steeple has a tower with three stages and a broach spire. The windows are lancets, and part of the body of the church has an embattled parapet.

== See also ==
- Listed buildings in Ripon
