= Bishopton Lodge =

Building in Ripon, North Yorkshire, England

Coordinates: 54°08′06″N 1°32′31″W

Bishopton Lodge is a historic building in Ripon, a city in North Yorkshire, in England.

The house was built in the mid 18th century, for William Aislabie, to accommodate one of the stewards of his property at Studley Royal. It was later extended to both east and west. During the First World War, the surrounding land was used for army camps. The house was grade II* listed in 1949. In 2015, it was marketed for sale for £1.45 million, at which time it had three reception rooms, five bedrooms, a study, kitchen, conservatory and cellars.

The house is built of brown brick, with rusticated quoins, a wooden modillion eaves cornice, and a pyramidal stone slate roof with a weathervane. There are two storeys and three bays, and flanking single-storey two-bay extensions. The central doorway has a moulded surround and a moulded cornice. To its left is a canted bay window, and the other windows are sashes with channelled stucco voussoirs. The inner bay of each extension has a round-arched carriage entry with channelled stucco voussoirs, and the outer bay contains a sash window and a pediment containing a Diocletian window. Inside, there is a grand staircase hall with Rococo plasterwork on the ceiling and two rooms with 18th-century chimneypieces.

== See also ==
- Grade II* listed buildings in North Yorkshire (district)
- Listed buildings in Ripon
