= The Unicorn Hotel =

Hotel in Ripon, North Yorkshire, England

Coordinates: 54°08′10″N 1°31′23″W

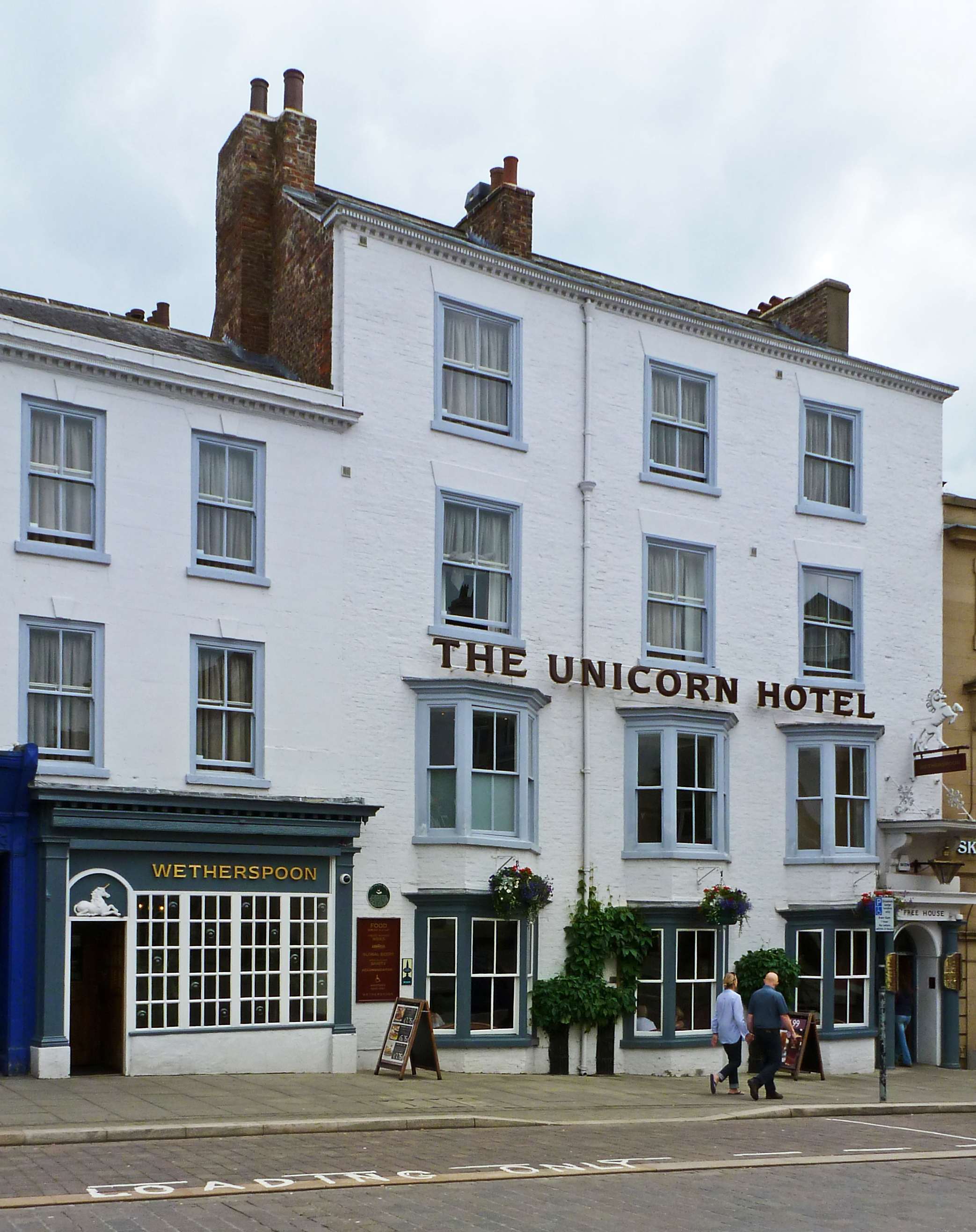
The building in 2012

The Unicorn Hotel is a historic building in Ripon, a city in North Yorkshire, England.

The site, on the Market Place, has been occupied by an inn since the medieval period. The Unicorn was first recorded in the 17th century, and it became the city's most important coaching inn. The inn was rebuilt in the 1750s, although it may contain some older material. In the early 19th century, a third storey was added to the building. Visitors to the hotel included Lewis Carroll in 1858. In 2011 the property was acquired by Wetherspoons, which refurbished it, following which it had 32 rooms and several eating and drinking areas. The building was grade II listed in 1970.

The hotel is built of whitewashed brick, with a modillion and dentilled eaves cornice. There are four storeys and three bays. At the right is a round-headed doorway with Tuscan three-quarter columns, an entablature, and a semicircular fanlight, above which is a suspended moulded flat hood on moulded scrolled consoles. The lower two floors contain canted bay windows with moulded cornices, and on the top two floors are sash windows.

The hotel incorporates another building, to the left, which was built in the 18th century and is separately grade II listed. It is constructed of grooved stucco or painted stone, has a wooden modillion eaves cornice and a blocking course, and a slate roof. There are three storeys and four bays. The ground floor has two shopfronts. The right, dating from the mid-19th century, has Tuscan pilasters and a moulded cornice. The left, dating from the late 19th century is more elaborate, with fluted pilasters, a door in a recessed porch with an oblong fanlight, another door in a recessed porch between plate glass windows, and glazing bars continued upwards to form a floral motif. On the upper floors are sash windows.

== See also ==
- Listed buildings in Ripon
