= Black Bull, Ripon =

Pub in Ripon, North Yorkshire, England

Coordinates: 54.1375°N 1.5231°W

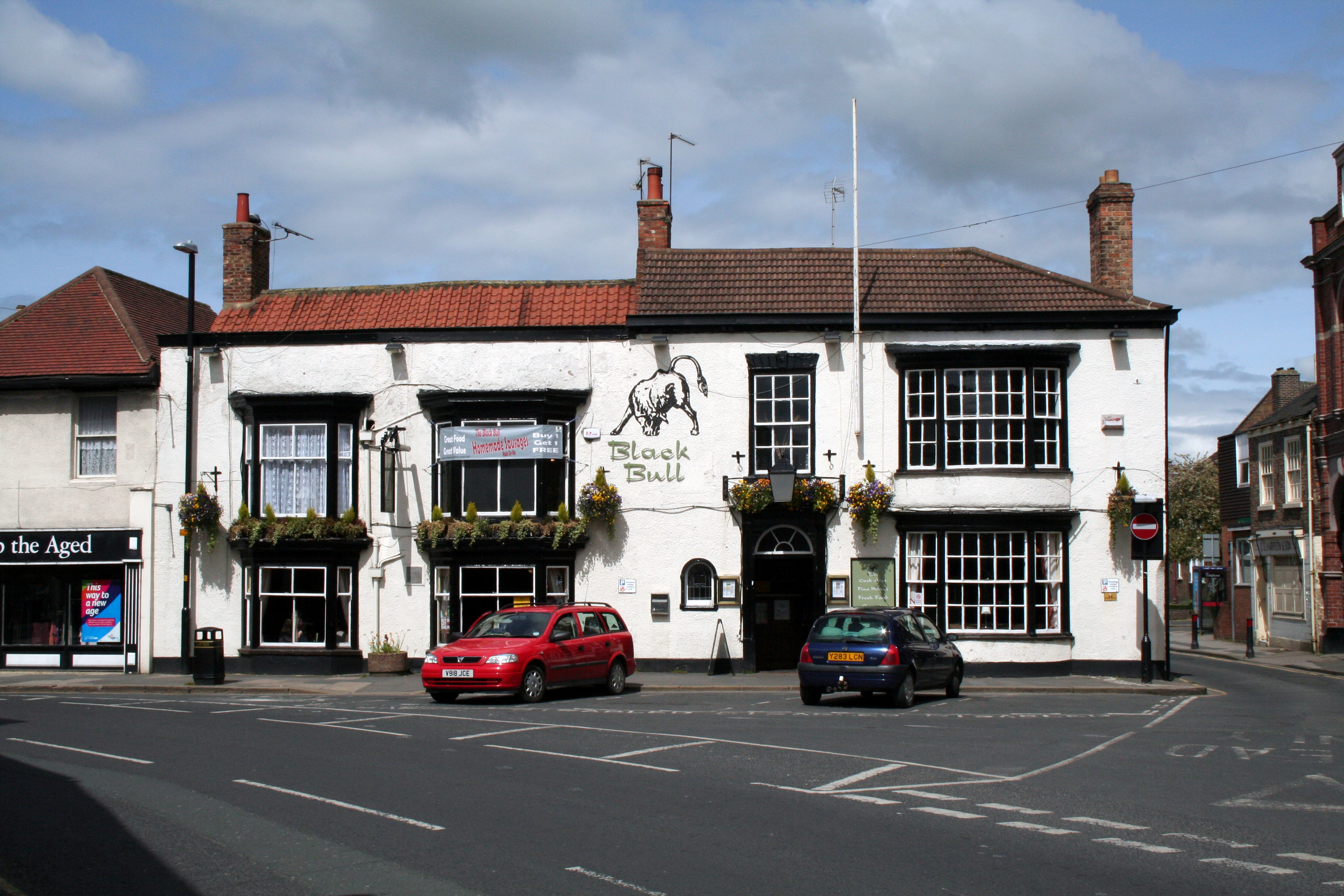
The pub, in 2010

The Black Bull is a historic pub in Ripon, a city in North Yorkshire, in England.

The pub lies on the Old Market Place. The western part of the pub is a timber-framed building, constructed in the 17th century, while the eastern part of the pub was built in the early 19th century. By this time, it was an important coaching inn, served by the Earl of Zetland, Richmond Courier, Impire and Union stagecoaches. The western part was refronted in the mid 19th century. The pub was grade II listed in 1949. In 2013, the pub was renamed "So! Bar and Eats", but in 2024 it returned to the "Black Bull" name. It is owned by Greene King.

The building is roughcast with pantile roofs, the right higher, and each part has two storeys and two bays. The left part contains two two-storey bay windows with moulded cornices, and above is a parapet. On the right part is a doorway with reeded pilaster, a semicircular fanlight and a cornice, to its left is a small round-headed window, above is a sash window with a wedge lintel and a keystone, and to the right is a two-storey bow window. Inside, there is a mid-18th century staircase. The bar is in the eastern section, while the western section has a further seating area, and there is a large games area upstairs.

== See also ==
- Listed buildings in Ripon
