= Thorpe Prebend House =

House in Ripon, North Yorkshire, England

Coordinates: 54°08′02″N 1°31′14″W

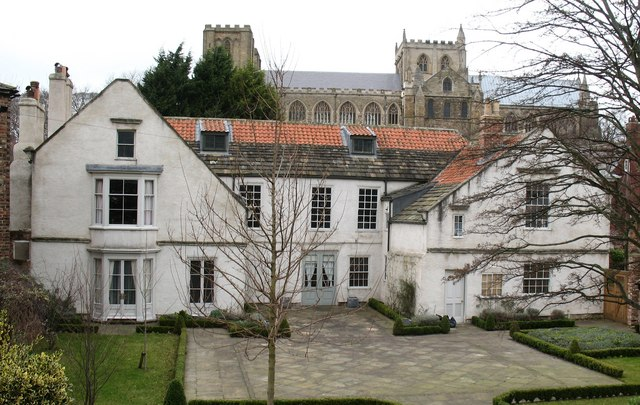
The building, in 2008

Thorpe Prebend House is a historic building in Ripon, a city in North Yorkshire, in England.

The oldest part of the building is the east wing, which was built in 1517. It is likely that it was an extension to an older building, to the west, which was replaced by a new hall and west wing, in 1584. In the mid 17th century, it was largely rebuilt in brick. The windows and doors were altered in the 18th and 19th centuries.

Originally built to house the prebend of Littlethorpe, the house is recorded as having been used for casting bells at one time before being restored to house Marmaduke Bradley, the last abbot of Fountains Abbey. It is said to have later been used to entertain both James VI and I and Charles I of England. In 1914, it became Ripon Museum, which closed in 1956; the building was later restored to serve as the minster's interpretative centre. The building has been grade II* listed since 1949.

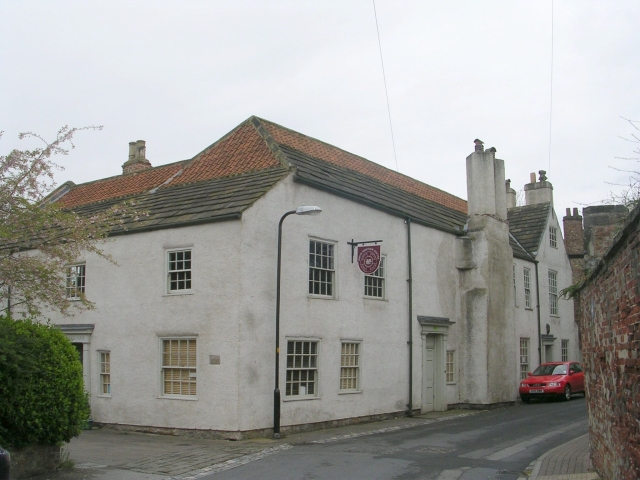
Front of the house

Part of the house has a timber framed core, later encased or replaced in brick and roughcast, and the house has roofs of pantile and stone slate with coped gables on cut kneelers. There are two storeys and attics, a main range of four bays, and flanking wings projecting to the south. The doorway is on the north front and has a Tuscan surround. The west wing has French windows, a two-storey canted bay window and dormers, and elsewhere are sash and casement windows.

Inside, the hall fireplace is 17th century, as is the reset panelling in the west wing. The elm staircase is 18th century, as is much of the woodwork in the room above the hall.

== See also ==
- Grade II* listed buildings in North Yorkshire (district)
- Listed buildings in Ripon
