= The Old Chapel, Ripon =

Former chapel in Ripon, North Yorkshire, England

Coordinates: 54°08′20″N 1°31′30″W

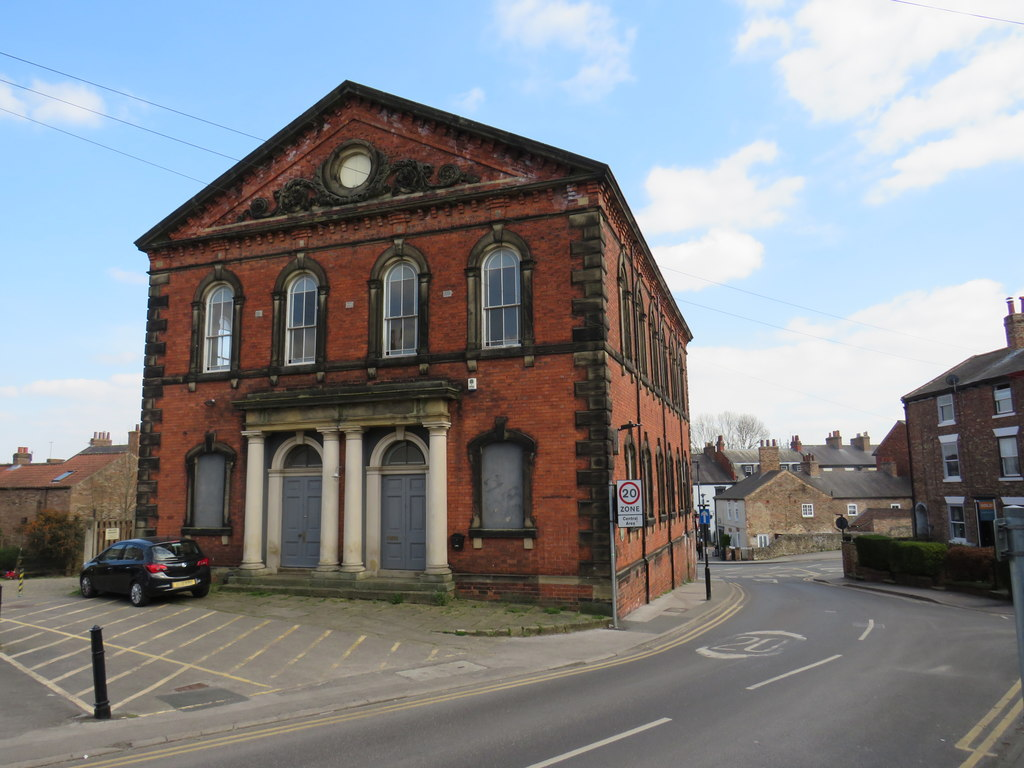
The building, in 2019

The Old Chapel is a historic building in Ripon, a city in North Yorkshire, in England.

The first Wesleyan Methodist Church in Ripon opened in 1777, in an existing building on Coltsgate Hill. John Wesley visited the chapel in 1780. In 1861, the building was demolished and a replacement chapel was constructed, at a cost of £2,000. In 1871, a Wesleyan day school was opened across the road; this operated until about 1940 and was later converted into flats. In 1932, the Wesleyan Methodists became part of the new Methodist Union, and the chapel closed in 1963, the congregation moving to the former Primitive Methodist chapel on Allhallowgate. The building was converted to become the city's first supermarket, U-Save. In the 1970s, it became a hi-fi shop, and it was later used as offices. In 2017, it was sold for conversion into housing. The building has been grade II listed since 1977.

The chapel is built of brick with stone dressings, rusticated quoins, a sill band, and a pediment containing an oculus and carved foliage in the tympanum. There are two storeys, four bays on the front and six on the sides. In the centre are paired doorways, each flanked by Tuscan half-columns with an entablature, a semicircular fanlight with moulded voussoirs, imposts and a keystone. The windows are sashes, with segmental heads on the ground floor, round heads and moulded imposts on the upper floor, and all with keystones.

== See also ==
- Listed buildings in Ripon
