= Ripon Opera House =

Building in Ripon, North Yorkshire, England

Coordinates: 54°08′06″N 1°31′30″W

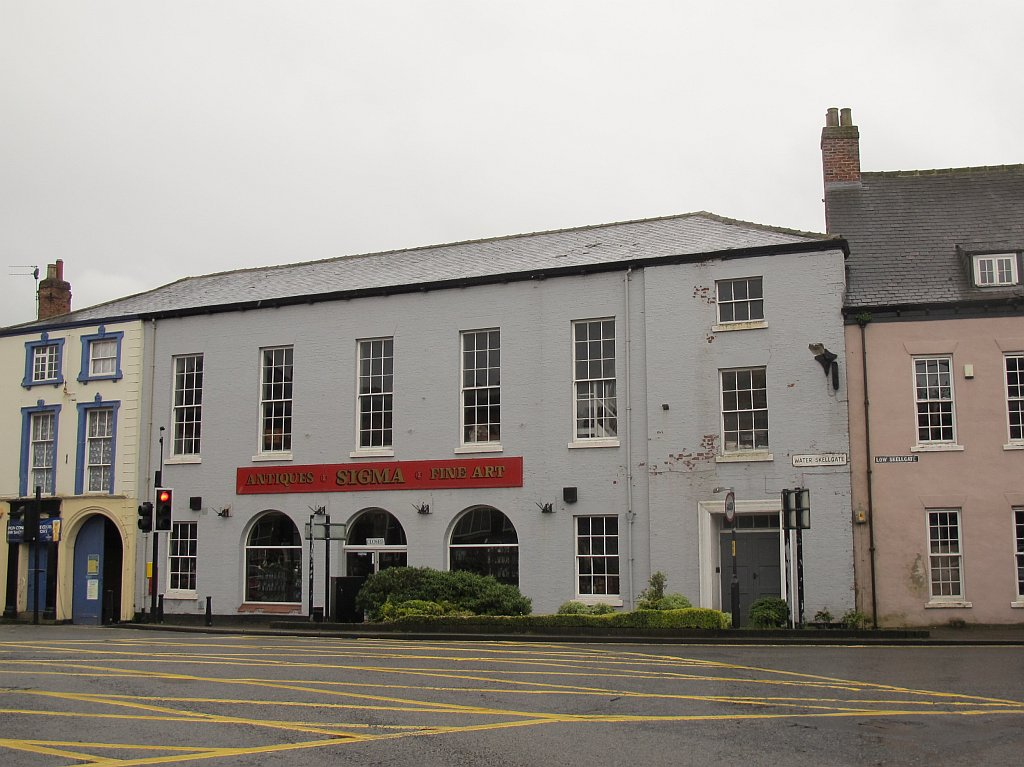
The building, in 2016

Ripon Opera House is a historic building in Ripon, a city in North Yorkshire, in England.

In 1834, the founders of Ripon's subscription library constructed the Public Rooms, to provide space for events. In 1886, the larger Victoria Hall was erected to the rear, at right angles, to a design by George Mallinson. It was more lavishly decorated than the older Public Rooms, and cost £2,000 to construct. In about 1912, the hall was converted into a cinema named the "Opera House", although it continued to host live events. It offered 800 seats on two levels. The cinema closed in about 1960, with the hall being converted into a factory, and the public rooms into government offices. The factory burned down around 1980, and the offices were later converted into the Sigma Antiques shop.

The surviving building is constructed of whitewashed brick, with bracketed eaves and a slate roof. There are two storeys and five bays, and a single-bay extension to the right of the same height with three storeys. In the centre are three round arches, the middle one containing a doorway and the others with windows, and the other windows are sash windows. On the extension is a recessed doorway with an oblong fanlight. It has been grade II listed since 1977.

== See also ==
- Listed buildings in North Yorkshire
