= Grade II* listed buildings in North Yorkshire (district) =

There are over 20,000 Grade II* listed buildings in England. This page is a list of 384 buildings in the unitary authority area of North Yorkshire.

As there are 536 Grade II* listed buildings in the district, the 152 churches and chapels are instead detailed in the article Grade II* listed churches in North Yorkshire (district).

Name	Location	Type	Completed (Note: The date given is the date used by Historic England as significant for the initial building or that of an important part in the structure's description.)	Date designated	Grid ref. (Note: The grid reference is based on the British national grid reference system, sometimes known as OSGB36, used by the Ordnance Survey.) Geo-coordinates	Entry number (Note: The "List Entry Number" is a unique number assigned to each listed building and scheduled monument by Historic England.)	Image
Aiskew Mill	Aiskew	Watermill	Late 18th century	6 October 1981	SE2706188169; 54°17′18″N 1°35′09″W	1150910	Aiskew Mill More images
Aislaby Hall, front Wall and Gate Piers	Aislaby (near Pickering)	House	Earlier than 1733	10 November 1953	SE7759485681; 54°15′39″N 0°48′37″W	1289105	Upload Photo
Pond House	Aislaby (near Whitby)	House	18th century	6 October 1969	NZ8597808736; 54°28′00″N 0°40′30″W	1316048	Upload Photo
St Hilda's Preparatory School	Aislaby (near Whitby)	House	Third Quarter of 18th century	19 February 1952	NZ8612907995; 54°27′36″N 0°40′22″W	1148951	St Hilda's Preparatory School More images
Gazebo and Garden Walls attached to Aislaby Hall	Aislaby	Garden Wall	Early 18th century	10 November 1953	SE7767285660; 54°15′39″N 0°48′33″W	1203792	Upload Photo
Parcevall Hall	Skyreholme, Appletreewick	House	16th century	10 September 1954	SE0689161249; 54°02′50″N 1°53′46″W	1157423	Parcevall Hall More images
Henry Simpson's Barn	Skyreholme, Appletreewick	Barn	1737	26 October 1995	SE0695161288; 54°02′51″N 1°53′43″W	1249282	Henry Simpson's Barn More images
High Hall	Appletreewick	House	16th century	10 September 1954	SE0543860090; 54°02′12″N 1°55′06″W	1131792	High Hall More images
Old Powder Magazine	Arkengarthdale	Powder Magazine	c. 1804	7 December 1966	NY9986303429; 54°25′35″N 2°00′13″W	1130838	Old Powder Magazine More images
West End House	West End, Askrigg	House	15th century	25 March 1969	SD9475591051; 54°18′54″N 2°04′56″W	1131195	West End House More images
Countersett Hall	Countersett, Bainbridge	Manor House	1650	16 January 1952	SD9190887909; 54°17′12″N 2°07′33″W	1316903	Countersett Hall More images
School and School House	Baldersby	School	1854	26 May 1971	SE3659476885; 54°11′11″N 1°26′27″W	1150054	School and School House More images
The Old Vicarage	Baldersby St James, Baldersby	Vicarage	1854	26 May 1971	SE3667976988; 54°11′14″N 1°26′22″W	1172915	Upload Photo
Barn to north-west of Newton Hall	Bank Newton	Cow house	Mid-17th century	10 September 1954	SD9090453146; 53°58′27″N 2°08′25″W	1167635	Upload Photo
Bank Newton Hall	Bank Newton	House	Mid-17th century	10 September 1954	SD9092453108; 53°58′26″N 2°08′23″W	1316866	Bank Newton Hall More images
Barden Old Hall	Barden	Manor House	Early 15th century	13 February 1967	SE1429393508; 54°20′13″N 1°46′54″W	1318585	Barden Old Hall More images
Beamsley Hospital (south range)	Beamsley	Almshouse	1593	10 September 1954	SE0823953030; 53°58′24″N 1°52′33″W	1166620	Beamsley Hospital (south range) More images
Old Hall	Bellerby	House	Early 17th century	13 February 1967	SE1150892914; 54°19′54″N 1°49′28″W	1130859	Old Hall More images
Mewith Head Hall, wall to garden and gatepiers	Bentham	House	Early 18th century	20 February 1958	SD6984166903; 54°05′50″N 2°27′46″W	1132417	Mewith Head Hall, wall to garden and gatepiers More images
Bewerley Grange	Bewerley	House	1679	6 March 1967	SE1599164820; 54°04′45″N 1°45′26″W	1150592	Bewerley Grange More images
Bewerley Old Hall	Bewerley	House	Late 16th century - Early 17th century	23 April 1952	SE1599464701; 54°04′41″N 1°45′25″W	1150590	Upload Photo
Stingamires and attached Outbuilding	Bilsdale Midcable	Farmhouse	17th century	30 October 1990	SE5631395756; 54°21′15″N 1°08′06″W	1314894	Stingamires and attached Outbuilding More images
Birdsall House	The Park, Birdsall	Country House	Late 16th century	20 September 1951	SE8150664842; 54°04′23″N 0°45′21″W	1174509	Birdsall House More images
Longridge Farmhouse and Outbuilding	Bishopdale	Farmhouse	1653	25 March 1969	SD9604583190; 54°14′40″N 2°03′44″W	1318311	Upload Photo
Smelter Farmhouse	Bishopdale	Farmhouse	1701	25 March 1969	SD9645982873; 54°14′30″N 2°03′21″W	1318314	Smelter Farmhouse More images
Bolton Abbey Hall	Bolton Abbey	House	Mid-19th century	10 September 1954	SE0729254204; 53°59′02″N 1°53′25″W	1131774	Bolton Abbey Hall More images
The Great Tythe Barn	Bolton Abbey	Threshing barn	16th century	10 September 1954	SE0725353838; 53°58′50″N 1°53′27″W	1131772	The Great Tythe Barn More images
The Old Rectory	Bolton Abbey	House	Late 17th century	10 September 1954	SE0738754140; 53°59′00″N 1°53′20″W	1131776	The Old Rectory More images
Bolton Old Hall	Bolton-on-Swale	Tower House	15th century	4 February 1969	SE2531799144; 54°23′14″N 1°36′42″W	1131520	Upload Photo
Bolton Percy Gatehouse	Bolton Percy	Gatehouse	15th century	29 January 1980	SE5314841241; 53°51′53″N 1°11′36″W	1148416	Bolton Percy Gatehouse More images
Aldborough Hall	Aldborough, Boroughbridge	House	Early 17th century	8 March 1952	SE4081766456; 54°05′33″N 1°22′39″W	1315502	Upload Photo
Brandsby Hall	Brandsby-cum-Stearsby	Country House	c1742-8	28 February 1952	SE5977271839; 54°08′20″N 1°05′12″W	1293608	Upload Photo
The Old Rectory	Brandsby-cum-Stearsby	House	16th century	28 February 1952	SE5976772064; 54°08′27″N 1°05′12″W	1190810	The Old Rectory More images
Catterick Bridge	Brough with St Giles	Bridge	1422	4 February 1969	SE2274499329; 54°23′20″N 1°39′05″W	1131481	Catterick Bridge More images
The Almshouses	Burneston	Almshouse	1680	22 August 1966	SE3080184960; 54°15′34″N 1°31′43″W	1293993	The Almshouses More images
Barn about 100m to south of Nutwith Cote	Burton-on-Yore	Barn	Early-Mid 18th century	9 August 1966	SE2310078807; 54°12′16″N 1°38′51″W	1316885	Upload Photo
Coach House and Bee Hives about 10m to north of Nutwith Cote	Burton-on-Yore	Beehive	16th century	9 August 1966	SE2312579001; 54°12′22″N 1°38′49″W	1132066	Coach House and Bee Hives about 10m to north of Nutwith Cote More images
Nutwith Cote	Burton-on-Yore	Farmhouse	17th century	28 April 1986	SE2312578958; 54°12′21″N 1°38′49″W	1132064	Nutwith Cote More images
Outbuilding about 20m north of Nutwith Cote	Burton-on-Yore	Storehouse	Early 18th century	9 August 1966	SE2311779027; 54°12′23″N 1°38′50″W	1316886	Outbuilding about 20m north of Nutwith Cote More images
Aldby Park	Buttercrambe, Buttercrambe with Bossall	Country House	1726	24 January 1985	SE7324458407; 54°00′59″N 0°53′01″W	1149646	Aldby Park More images
Trappes Hall	Carleton	House	c.1686	10 September 1954	SD9713049741; 53°56′38″N 2°02′43″W	1166761	Trappes Hall More images
Thatch Cottage	Carlton Husthwaite	Open Hall House	16th century	17 May 1960	SE4991576651; 54°11′00″N 1°14′12″W	1150755	Thatch Cottage More images
The Old Hall	Carlton Husthwaite	Manor House	c. 1685	17 May 1960	SE4977476721; 54°11′02″N 1°14′20″W	1150754	The Old Hall More images
Bear Park	Bear Park, Carperby-cum-Thoresby	Manor House	17th century	16 January 1952	SE0062888878; 54°17′44″N 1°59′31″W	1301406	Upload Photo
The Grange	Cawood	House	18th century	17 November 1966	SE5763137490; 53°49′50″N 1°07′33″W	1132512	The Grange More images
Yew Tree House and Yew Tree Cottage	Cawood	House	Mid-Late 17th century	17 November 1966	SE5763137638; 53°49′55″N 1°07′33″W	1132509	Yew Tree House and Yew Tree Cottage More images
Ingleborough Hall	Clapham cum Newby	Country house	c.1814	20 February 1958	SD7468269343; 54°07′10″N 2°23′20″W	1132400	Upload Photo
Holmes House	South Duffield, Cliffe (near Selby)	House	Early 17th century	17 November 1966	SE6965832598; 53°47′06″N 0°56′39″W	1148486	Holmes House More images
Clifton Castle	Clifton-on-Yore	Country House	c. 1800	5 May 1952	SE2184784244; 54°15′12″N 1°39′58″W	1151220	Clifton Castle More images
Colburn Hall	Colburn	Manor House	1662	19 December 1951	SE1961099228; 54°23′17″N 1°41′58″W	1131498	Colburn Hall More images
Kilnsey Old Hall	Kilnsey, Conistone with Kilnsey	House	1648	10 September 1954	SD9732467845; 54°06′23″N 2°02′33″W	1316821	Kilnsey Old Hall More images
Coach House and Stables of Constable Burton Hall	Burton Park, Constable Burton	Tack Room	c. 1765	13 February 1967	SE1633291245; 54°19′00″N 1°45′02″W	1318295	Upload Photo
Coulton Mill	Coulton	Watermill	1721	11 December 1985	SE6426573677; 54°09′17″N 1°01′04″W	1296371	Coulton Mill More images
Coverham Abbey Gatehouse	Coverham Abbey, Coverham with Agglethorpe	Gate	Early 16th century	13 February 1967	SE1047486319; 54°16′21″N 1°50′26″W	1178895	Coverham Abbey Gatehouse More images
Coverham Bridge	Coverham, Coverham with Agglethorpe	Bridge	15th century	13 February 1967	SE1043786210; 54°16′17″N 1°50′28″W	1130893	Coverham Bridge More images
Garth Cottage	Coverham Abbey, Coverham with Agglethorpe	House	Medieval	13 February 1967	SE1058586383; 54°16′23″N 1°50′20″W	1302197	Garth Cottage More images
Stone Effigies of Knights about 7m east of Coverham Abbey House	Coverham Abbey, Coverham with Agglethorpe	Effigy	Late 13th century	24 January 1986	SE1060686368; 54°16′22″N 1°50′19″W	1130897	Stone Effigies of Knights about 7m east of Coverham Abbey House
Carr Head Hall	Cowling	Country house	Mid-18th century	10 September 1954	SD9750044277; 53°53′41″N 2°02′22″W	1157455	Carr Head Hall More images
Long Croft and attached barn	Cowling	Farmhouse and barn	c.1700	23 October 1984	SD9693643945; 53°53′30″N 2°02′53″W	1131807	Upload Photo
Crakehall Hall and Garden Walls	Crakehall	House	Early 18th century	22 August 1966	SE2451590063; 54°18′20″N 1°37′29″W	1150922	Crakehall Hall and Garden Walls More images
Crathorne Hall, Gate Piers and Forecourt Walls	Crathorne	Country House	1904	23 September 1982	NZ4460808458; 54°28′10″N 1°18′48″W	1294649	Crathorne Hall, Gate Piers and Forecourt Walls More images
Crayke Manor	Crayke	House	17th century	28 February 1952	SE5661271689; 54°08′17″N 1°08′06″W	1189234	Crayke Manor More images
Dalton Hall	Dalton	Fortified Manor House	15th century	4 February 1969	NZ1106409020; 54°28′35″N 1°49′51″W	1131349	Dalton Hall More images
Duck Bridge	Danby	Bridge	1717	6 October 1969	NZ7195507739; 54°27′36″N 0°53′30″W	1302337	Duck Bridge More images
Lazenby Hall	Danby Wiske with Lazenby	House	Late 17th century	29 January 1953	SE3395398524; 54°22′52″N 1°28′44″W	1150876	Upload Photo
Downholme Bridge	Downholme	Bridge	Late 17th century	4 February 1969	SE1135499176; 54°23′17″N 1°49′36″W	1131326	Downholme Bridge More images
Easby Hall and Nos 1 and 2 Easby Court	Easby	Apartment	c. 1730	4 February 1969	NZ1871000356; 54°23′54″N 1°42′48″W	1318260	Easby Hall and Nos 1 and 2 Easby Court More images
Mount Grace House	East Harlsey	House	1901	31 March 1970	SE4485798479; 54°22′47″N 1°18′39″W	1150882	Mount Grace House More images
Lodge and Gateway with Screen Walls to North East of Rounton Grange	East Rounton	House	1909	23 June 1966	NZ4323103439; 54°25′28″N 1°20′07″W	1188873	Lodge and Gateway with Screen Walls to North East of Rounton Grange More images
The Coach House, Rounton Grange	East Rounton	Apartment	1875	8 May 1989	NZ4267302990; 54°25′14″N 1°20′38″W	1150672	The Coach House, Rounton Grange
Braithwaite Hall	East Witton	Manor House	1667	25 June 1985	SE1173485773; 54°16′03″N 1°49′17″W	1318557	Braithwaite Hall More images
Wall of Cascade about 100m north of Ebberston Hall	Ebberston and Yedingham	Wall	c. 1718	5 February 1986	SE8925683529; 54°14′23″N 0°37′55″W	1315781	Upload Photo
Wall of Cascade about 50m north of Ebberston Hall	Ebberston and Yedingham	Wall	c. 1718	5 February 1986	SE8924983479; 54°14′21″N 0°37′56″W	1206196	Upload Photo
Westwood Farmhouse	Ebberston and Yedingham	Farmhouse	Mid 18th century	5 February 1986	SE8986582455; 54°13′48″N 0°37′23″W	1280313	Westwood Farmhouse More images
Beggars Bridge	Egton	Packhorse Bridge	1619	7 July 1989	NZ7844205476; 54°26′19″N 0°47′31″W	1296156	Beggars Bridge More images
Delves Cottage	Delves, Egton	House	17th century	7 July 1989	NZ7910904563; 54°25′49″N 0°46′55″W	1148817	Delves Cottage More images
Elslack Hall Farmhouse and Elslack Hall Cottage with garden wall adjoining to north	Elslack	Farmhouse	1988	10 September 1954	SD9285249225; 53°56′21″N 2°06′37″W	1166963	Elslack Hall Farmhouse and Elslack Hall Cottage with garden wall adjoining to north More images
Manor House	Embsay, Embsay with Eastby	House	c.1635	10 September 1954	SE0054253830; 53°58′50″N 1°59′36″W	1157616	Manor House More images
Coach House and Stables to rear of Escrick Park	Escrick	School	1763	10 April 1986	SE6320842346; 53°52′25″N 1°02′24″W	1148489	Upload Photo
Escrick Park	Escrick	Country House	c1680 - 1690	25 October 1951	SE6319142283; 53°52′22″N 1°02′25″W	1167878	Escrick Park More images
Eshton Hall	Eshton	House	1825–27	10 September 1954	SD9377655994; 54°00′00″N 2°05′47″W	1167726	Eshton Hall More images
Duck House	Farndale East	Farmhouse	C16-C17	24 June 1987	SE6830094621; 54°20′33″N 0°57′03″W	1316011	Upload Photo
Mount St John	Felixkirk	House	1720	13 November 1978	SE4732884856; 54°15′26″N 1°16′30″W	1241303	Mount St John More images
Filey railway station	Filey	Station	Late 19th century	23 August 1985	TA1136880683; 54°12′35″N 0°17′38″W	1167853	Filey railway station More images
Brockabank	Flasby with Winterburn	Farmhouse	Late 16th century	10 September 1954	SD9344656886; 54°00′29″N 2°06′05″W	1131652	Brockabank More images
Friars Head	Flasby with Winterburn	House	c.1670	10 September 1954	SD9320757533; 54°00′50″N 2°06′19″W	1157656	Friars Head More images
Temple of Victory with railed enclosure	Flaxby	Temple	1790	15 March 1966	SE4086258410; 54°01′12″N 1°22′40″W	1315590	Temple of Victory with railed enclosure More images
Dovecote	Forcett Park, Forcett and Carkin	Dovecote	Mid - Late 18th century	4 February 1969	NZ1747412485; 54°30′27″N 1°43′54″W	1157745	Dovecote More images
East Gateway and Lodges	Forcett Park, Forcett and Carkin	Gate	19th century	4 February 1969	NZ1750612305; 54°30′21″N 1°43′52″W	1316917	East Gateway and Lodges More images
Grotto and Icehouse	Forcett Park, Forcett and Carkin	Icehouse	Late 18th century	4 February 1969	NZ1700012146; 54°30′16″N 1°44′20″W	1157748	Upload Photo
Stable Block to East of Forcett Hall	Forcett Park, Forcett and Carkin	Gate Pier	Late 18th century	4 February 1969	NZ1728912352; 54°30′22″N 1°44′04″W	1157736	Upload Photo
Foston Rectory	Foston	Vicarage	1813	25 January 1954	SE6874064859; 54°04′30″N 0°57′03″W	1149629	Foston Rectory More images
Bouthwaite Grange and Grange Cottage	Fountains Earth	House	1673	6 March 1967	SE1231971299; 54°08′15″N 1°48′47″W	1150524	Upload Photo
Farsyde House	Fylingdales	House	16th century	4 January 1990	NZ9502004390; 54°25′34″N 0°32′13″W	1167925	Upload Photo
Pigsty to South-west of the Cottage	Fyling Park, Fylingdales	Pigsty	1891	15 April 1988	NZ9366604094; 54°25′25″N 0°33′28″W	1148678	Pigsty to South-west of the Cottage More images
Thorpe Hall	Fylingthorpe, Fylingdales	House	1680	6 October 1969	NZ9440504935; 54°25′52″N 0°32′46″W	1148707	Thorpe Hall More images
Gateforth Hall	Gateforth	House	1814	23 August 1978	SE5559829562; 53°45′34″N 1°09′29″W	1132514	Gateforth Hall More images
Beck House	Giggleswick	House	Early 18th century	20 February 1958	SD8104463991; 54°04′17″N 2°17′28″W	1317037	Beck House More images
Ivy Fold	Giggleswick	House	Mid-17th century	20 February 1958	SD8110664071; 54°04′20″N 2°17′25″W	1131721	Upload Photo
Settle Bridge	Giggleswick	Road bridge	17th century	20 November 1987	SD8165264094; 54°04′21″N 2°16′55″W	1317032	Settle Bridge More images
Grimston Park	Grimston	Country House	Early 18th century	4 July 1952	SE4983741208; 53°51′53″N 1°14′37″W	1168029	Grimston Park More images
Hartforth Hall	Hartforth, Gilling with Hartforth and Sedbury	Country House	1744	4 February 1969	NZ1627606931; 54°27′27″N 1°45′02″W	1131933	Hartforth Hall More images
Summer House about 150m south-west of Gillingwood Hall	Gilling with Hartforth and Sedbury	Summerhouse	Early - Mid 18th century	4 February 1969	NZ1703104645; 54°26′13″N 1°44′20″W	1316932	Upload Photo
Beggars Bridge over River Esk	Glaisdale	Bridge	1619	6 October 1969	NZ7843805476; 54°26′19″N 0°47′32″W	1148573	Beggars Bridge over River Esk More images
Hart Hall	Glaisdale Side, Glaisdale	Farmhouse	1768	26 August 1987	NZ7743804977; 54°26′04″N 0°48′28″W	1148578	Hart Hall More images
Quarry Cottage	Glaisdale Side, Glaisdale	Farmhouse	19th century	6 October 1969	NZ7694704746; 54°25′56″N 0°48′55″W	1316247	Upload Photo
Street Farmhouse and Outbuildings Adjoining	Street, Glaisdale	Farmhouse	1749	6 October 1969	NZ7342304719; 54°25′57″N 0°52′11″W	1316254	Upload Photo
Brereton Cottage Brereton House	Goathland Village, Goathland	Farmhouse	Earlier	6 October 1969	NZ8318401302; 54°24′01″N 0°43′13″W	1316155	Brereton Cottage Brereton House More images
Goldsborough Hall	Goldsborough	Country House	c. 1625	8 March 1952	SE3836156048; 53°59′57″N 1°24′59″W	1315586	Goldsborough Hall More images
Grantley Hall	Grantley	Country House	Early 18th century	23 April 1952	SE2417969277; 54°07′08″N 1°37′54″W	1173371	Grantley Hall More images
Grassington Hall	Grassington	House	Medieval	10 September 1954	SE0020964058; 54°04′21″N 1°59′54″W	1132153	Upload Photo
Meynell Hall	Great and Little Broughton	Farmhouse	Early 17th century	30 October 1990	NZ5635506184; 54°26′53″N 1°07′57″W	1188927	Meynell Hall More images
Ayton Hall	Great Ayton	Country House	c. 1690	23 June 1966	NZ5554110837; 54°29′23″N 1°08′39″W	1150651	Ayton Hall More images
Ribston Hall	Ribston Park, Great Ribston with Walshford	Country House	1674	8 March 1952	SE3918553774; 53°58′43″N 1°24′14″W	1149963	Ribston Hall More images
Stables to North of Ribston Hall	Ribston Park, Great Ribston with Walshford	House	Mid C20	15 March 1966	SE3915353884; 53°58′46″N 1°24′16″W	1189567	Upload Photo
Walshford Lodge to Ribston Hall with Gatepiers and linking Walls	Walshford, Great Ribston with Walshford	Gate	Mid-Late 18th century	15 March 1966	SE4126553265; 53°58′26″N 1°22′21″W	1315596	Walshford Lodge to Ribston Hall with Gatepiers and linking Walls More images
Spring Hall	Grewelthorpe	House	1708	6 March 1967	SE2471475259; 54°10′21″N 1°37′22″W	1150495	Spring Hall More images
The Ruin, Mowbray Point	Hackfall, Grewelthorpe	Banqueting House	c. 1750	25 June 1987	SE2323177234; 54°11′25″N 1°38′44″W	1150534	The Ruin, Mowbray Point More images
Blackburn Hall	Grinton	Clerical Dwelling	Medieval	4 September 1952	SE0462598449; 54°22′53″N 1°55′49″W	1130810	Blackburn Hall More images
Low Whita Farm (east)	Grinton	Farmhouse	17th century	29 May 2019	SE000981; 54°22′44″N 2°00′02″W	1463837	Low Whita Farm (east) More images
Low Whita Farm (west)	Grinton	Farmhouse	17th century	29 May 2019	SE000981; 54°22′45″N 2°00′04″W	1462332	Upload Photo
Grinton Smelting Mill and Watercourse	Cogden Moor, Grinton	Smelt Mill	c. 1820	13 February 1973	SE0487796425; 54°21′48″N 1°55′35″W	1318580	Grinton Smelting Mill and Watercourse More images
North York Moors Railway Pedestrian Subway about 110m Long	North Yorkshire Moors Railway, Grosmont	Subway	c. 1834	7 July 1989	NZ8282205096; 54°26′04″N 0°43′29″W	1148752	North York Moors Railway Pedestrian Subway about 110m Long More images
Crimple Valley Viaduct	Crimple, Harrogate	Viaduct	c. 1848	4 February 1975	SE3178953106; 53°58′23″N 1°31′01″W	1189723	Crimple Valley Viaduct More images
Grove House	Harrogate	House	1897–1902	4 February 1975	SE3071656290; 54°00′06″N 1°31′58″W	1149433	Grove House More images
Bilton Grove Farmhouse	Daw Cross, Harrogate	Farmhouse	c. 1662	18 July 1949	SE2939751556; 53°57′33″N 1°33′12″W	1149442	Upload Photo
Hill Top Hall	Daw Cross, Harrogate	Farmhouse	17th century	18 July 1949	SE2902551610; 53°57′35″N 1°33′33″W	1149443	Upload Photo
Royal Hall	Harrogate	Concert Hall	1903	4 February 1975	SE2999455588; 53°59′44″N 1°32′38″W	1315842	Royal Hall More images
Royal Pump Room Museum	Harrogate	Museum	1953	18 July 1949	SE2981455374; 53°59′37″N 1°32′48″W	1149478	Royal Pump Room Museum More images
St John's Well	Harrogate	Pavilion	1842	18 July 1949	SE3150555359; 53°59′36″N 1°31′15″W	1281537	St John's Well More images
Tewit Well	Harrogate	Pavilion	c. 1804	18 July 1949	SE3061854467; 53°59′07″N 1°32′04″W	1293847	Tewit Well More images
White Hart Hotel	Harrogate	Hotel	c. 1846	15 June 1971	SE2986455271; 53°59′33″N 1°32′46″W	1315821	White Hart Hotel More images
29 and 30 Regent Parade	Harrogate	Shops	Late 18th century	4 February 1975	SE3091755860; 53°59′52″N 1°31′48″W	1149432	29 and 30 Regent Parade More images
1–4 West Park	Harrogate	Terrace	Earlier 19th century	18 July 1949	SE3021254984; 53°59′24″N 1°32′27″W	1149400	1–4 West Park More images
Harrogate War Memorial	Harrogate	War memorial	1923	14 June 2017	SE3013355280; 53°59′34″N 1°32′31″W	1446943	Harrogate War Memorial More images
Dougill Hall	Hartwith cum Winsley	Apartment	c. 1980	23 April 1952	SE2042161474; 54°02′56″N 1°41′23″W	1315290	Dougill Hall More images
Gayle Mill	Gayle, Hawes	Saw Mill	19th century	25 March 1969	SD8711689382; 54°18′00″N 2°11′58″W	1132000	Gayle Mill More images
Arden Hall	Hawnby	Country House	17th century	4 January 1955	SE5195490627; 54°18′31″N 1°12′11″W	1191079	Arden Hall More images
Arden Mill	Hawnby	Mill House	Early 18th century	31 October 2006	SE5212490658; 54°18′32″N 1°12′01″W	1391800	Arden Mill More images
Healaugh Priory	Healaugh	House	c. 1540	12 July 1985	SE4857546349; 53°54′40″N 1°15′43″W	1316677	Healaugh Priory More images
Arnford Farmhouse	Hellifield	Farmhouse	c.1700	20 February 1958	SD8364256279; 54°03′45″N 2°15′04″W	1317061	Upload Photo
Canons Garth and Doorway and Walls	Helmsley	House	Late 14th century	4 January 1955	SE6122483923; 54°14′50″N 1°03′43″W	1149306	Canons Garth and Doorway and Walls More images
Ha-ha wall, Duncombe Park	Duncombe Park Estate, Helmsley	Ha Ha		18 March 1985	SE6043183100; 54°14′24″N 1°04′27″W	1149268	Ha-ha wall, Duncombe Park
Former Laundry, Duncombe Park	Duncombe Park Estate, Helmsley	Laundry	c. 1730	4 January 1955	SE6031183201; 54°14′27″N 1°04′34″W	1149269	Former Laundry, Duncombe Park More images
Memorial to Second Baron Feversham	Helmsley	Commemorative Monument	c. 1867	18 March 1985	SE6127683800; 54°14′46″N 1°03′40″W	1315924	Memorial to Second Baron Feversham More images
Castle Howard Reservoir Basin and Pedestal at centre of Reservoir	Henderskelfe	Reservoir	1720s	22 June 1987	SE7187370204; 54°07′22″N 0°54′06″W	1316052	Castle Howard Reservoir Basin and Pedestal at centre of Reservoir More images
Gate Piers, Walls, Gates and Railings to Entrance of Ray Wood	Ray Wood, Henderskelfe	Gate	Early 18th century	22 June 1987	SE7171470158; 54°07′20″N 0°54′15″W	1148970	Upload Photo
Medici Vase and Pedestal	Castle Howard, Henderskelfe	Vase	1778	22 June 1987	SE7187070102; 54°07′18″N 0°54′07″W	1172761	Medici Vase and Pedestal More images
Pedestal about 100m west of Temple of Four Winds	Castle Howard, Henderskelfe	Garden Ornament	c. 1720	22 June 1987	SE7208669989; 54°07′15″N 0°53′55″W	1148981	Pedestal about 100m west of Temple of Four Winds More images
Pedestal about 150m west of Temple of Four Winds	Henderskelfe	Garden Ornament	c. 1720	22 June 1987	SE7203869991; 54°07′15″N 0°53′58″W	1296449	Pedestal about 150m west of Temple of Four Winds More images
Statue of a Satyr with Dog and Grapes, sometimes identified as Bacchus, and Pedestal	Henderskelfe	Statue	c. 1720	25 January 1954	SE7173670054; 54°07′17″N 0°54′14″W	1148982	Statue of a Satyr with Dog and Grapes, sometimes identified as Bacchus, and Pedestal More images
Statue of Apollo Belvedere and Pedestal about 90m south-east of Atlas Fountain	Castle Howard, Henderskelfe	Statue	Mid 18th century	25 January 1954	SE7169169843; 54°07′10″N 0°54′17″W	1316056	Statue of Apollo Belvedere and Pedestal about 90m south-east of Atlas Fountain More images
Statue of Farnese Hercules and Pedestal	Castle Howard, Henderskelfe	Statue	1723	25 January 1954	SE7186070023; 54°07′16″N 0°54′07″W	1173011	Statue of Farnese Hercules and Pedestal More images
Statue of Faun with a Kid and Pedestal about 75m North West of Atlas Fountain	Castle Howard, Henderskelfe	Statue	1723	25 January 1954	SE7158269961; 54°07′14″N 0°54′23″W	1316054	Statue of Faun with a Kid and Pedestal about 75m North West of Atlas Fountain More images
Statue of Figure Playing a Lyre and Pedestal	Castle Howard, Henderskelfe	Statue	Early 19th century	22 June 1987	SE7158969775; 54°07′08″N 0°54′22″W	1172819	Statue of Figure Playing a Lyre and Pedestal More images
Statue of Meleager and Pedestal	Castle Howard, Henderskelfe	Statue	c. 1720	25 January 1954	SE7198269994; 54°07′15″N 0°54′01″W	1316059	Statue of Meleager and Pedestal More images
Statue of Silenus with the Infant Bacchus and Pedestal about 75m north-east of Atlas Fountain	Castle Howard, Henderskelfe	Statue	Mid 18th century	22 June 1987	SE7167869989; 54°07′15″N 0°54′17″W	1172928	Statue of Silenus with the Infant Bacchus and Pedestal about 75m north-east of Atlas Fountain
The Boar Garden Statue of Wild Boar and Pedestal	Castle Howard, Henderskelfe	Statue	1768	22 June 1987	SE7151070050; 54°07′17″N 0°54′27″W	1172729	The Boar Garden Statue of Wild Boar and Pedestal More images
The Dairies (East House)	Castle Howard, Henderskelfe	House	c. 1720	22 June 1987	SE7135770349; 54°07′27″N 0°54′35″W	1296531	Upload Photo
Walled Garden Gardener's Cottage	Castle Howard, Henderskelfe	House	Early 19th century	22 June 1987	SE7143069886; 54°07′12″N 0°54′31″W	1148983	Walled Garden Gardener's Cottage More images
Walled Garden Gate Piers to Central North South Lane	Castle Howard, Henderskelfe	Gate Pier	Early 18th century	22 June 1987	SE7141269854; 54°07′11″N 0°54′32″W	1173032	Walled Garden Gate Piers to Central North South Lane
Walled Garden Statue of Venus De Medici and Pedestal	Castle Howard, Henderskelfe	Statue	Early 18th century	22 June 1987	SE7149169956; 54°07′14″N 0°54′28″W	1173045	Walled Garden Statue of Venus De Medici and Pedestal More images
The Red House	Hensall	House	1854	11 December 1967	SE5824622561; 53°41′47″N 1°07′10″W	1148401	Upload Photo
Kirkhill House	Staithes, Hinderwell	House	Late 18th or early 19th century	6 October 1969	NZ7834318794; 54°33′30″N 0°47′24″W	1148940	Kirkhill House More images
Lodge Hall	Horton in Ribblesdale	Farmhouse	1687	20 February 1958	SD7800277963; 54°11′49″N 2°20′19″W	1289489	Lodge Hall More images
Chapel to Huddleston Hall, now a Barn, about 4m to west of House	Huddleston with Newthorpe	Chapel	15th century	3 February 1967	SE4664233979; 53°48′00″N 1°17′36″W	1167970	Chapel to Huddleston Hall, now a Barn, about 4m to west of House
Huddleston Hall	Huddleston with Newthorpe	Manor House	Late 16th century	4 July 1952	SE4666633979; 53°48′00″N 1°17′35″W	1167923	Huddleston Hall More images
Stables to Huddleston Hall about 1 metre South East of House	Huddleston with Newthorpe	Stable	Late 16th century	4 July 1952	SE4667333946; 53°47′59″N 1°17′34″W	1167953	Stables to Huddleston Hall about 1 metre South East of House
Hunmanby Hall	Hunmanby	Cross Wing House	Later 17th century	11 January 1952	TA0936077264; 54°10′46″N 0°19′33″W	1316443	Hunmanby Hall More images
Forecourt and Garden Walls to North West of Arncliffe Hall	Ingleby Cross, Ingleby Arncliffe	Gate Pier	Mid 18th century	23 June 1966	NZ4526100223; 54°23′44″N 1°18′16″W	1314921	Upload Photo
Stable Block to South East of Arncliffe Hall including Nos 1-5 consecutive	Ingleby Cross, Ingleby Arncliffe	Stable	c. 1754	23 June 1966	NZ4536800168; 54°23′42″N 1°18′10″W	1151376	Stable Block to South East of Arncliffe Hall including Nos 1-5 consecutive
Barn with Engine House and attached Cart Lodge with Loft over, at North West End of Drummer Hill Farmhouse	Ingleby Greenhow	Horse Engine House	Mid 19th century	30 October 1990	NZ5698007560; 54°27′37″N 1°07′21″W	1294490	Upload Photo
Ingleby Manor	Ingleby Greenhow	Manor House	16th century	5 May 1952	NZ5858805786; 54°26′39″N 1°05′53″W	1314888	Ingleby Manor More images
Batty Moss Railway Viaduct (Ribblehead Viaduct)	Ingleton	Railway viaduct	1870–74	23 November 1988	SD7594479471; 54°12′37″N 2°22′13″W	1132228	Batty Moss Railway Viaduct (Ribblehead Viaduct) More images
Fold Farmhouse	Kettlewell	Farmhouse	Late 15th century	4 May 1989	SD9719872248; 54°08′46″N 2°02′40″W	1173639	Upload Photo
Kildwick Hall with kitchen block to rear	Kildwick	Kitchen	1673	10 September 1954	SE0117446307; 53°54′46″N 1°59′01″W	1132170	Kildwick Hall with kitchen block to rear More images
Carriage Gates and Gate Piers, Pedestrian Gates, Screen Walls and Railings at New Lodge	Kirby Hall Estate, Kirby Hall	Gate	18th century	15 March 1966	SE4523160750; 54°02′27″N 1°18′39″W	1293661	Carriage Gates and Gate Piers, Pedestrian Gates, Screen Walls and Railings at New Lodge More images
The Old Grammar School and Grammar School House and attached Wall and Railings	Kirby Hill	House	Early 18th century	19 December 1951	NZ1403706576; 54°27′16″N 1°47′06″W	1131319	The Old Grammar School and Grammar School House and attached Wall and Railings More images
Sion Hill Hall and attached Courtyard Wall	Kirby Wiske	Country House	1913	29 January 1987	SE3734184424; 54°15′15″N 1°25′42″W	1281486	Sion Hill Hall and attached Courtyard Wall More images
Kirkby Fleetham Hall	Kirkby Fleetham with Fencote	Country House	Mid/Late 18th century	22 August 1966	SE2814095684; 54°21′21″N 1°34′07″W	1295737	Kirkby Fleetham Hall More images
Harewood Bridge	River Wharfe, Kirkby Overblow	Bridge	c. 1729	2 September 1952	SE3122246084; 53°54′36″N 1°31′34″W	1265837	Harewood Bridge More images
The Hall	Kirklington, Kirklington-cum-Upsland	House	c. 1570	5 May 1952	SE3153481315; 54°13′36″N 1°31′04″W	1315187	The Hall More images
Conyngham Hall	Conyngham Hall, Knaresborough	House	Late 18th century	5 February 1952	SE3427357394; 54°00′41″N 1°28′43″W	1315613	Conyngham Hall More images
Gate Piers at Scriven Park	Knaresborough	Gate Pier		15 March 1966	SE3448457808; 54°00′54″N 1°28′31″W	1263099	Gate Piers at Scriven Park More images
Railway Viaduct over the River Nidd	Knaresborough	Railway Viaduct	1847–51	15 May 1968	SE3473457058; 54°00′30″N 1°28′17″W	1149911	Railway Viaduct over the River Nidd More images
Brawith Hall	Knayton with Brawith	House	Pre-1700	1 May 1952	SE4104387287; 54°16′46″N 1°22′16″W	1260588	Brawith Hall More images
Leake Hall	Leake	Farmhouse	17th century	27 August 1986	SE4338790551; 54°18′31″N 1°20′05″W	1150988	Leake Hall More images
Corn Mill	Leathley	Corn Mill	18th century	22 November 1966	SE2308847780; 53°55′32″N 1°39′00″W	1150012	Upload Photo
Leyburn Hall	Leyburn	Country House	c. 1750	13 February 1967	SE1103590484; 54°18′35″N 1°49′55″W	1130898	Leyburn Hall More images
Half Moon Pond	Studley Royal Park, Lindrick with Studley Royal and Fountains	Statue	Completed 1728	11 June 1986	SE2795068946; 54°06′56″N 1°34′26″W	1173896	Half Moon Pond More images
High Stables	Studley Park, Lindrick with Studley Royal and Fountains	House	1946	6 March 1967	SE2780070014; 54°07′31″N 1°34′34″W	1149813	High Stables More images
Moon and Crescent Ponds	Studley Park, Lindrick with Studley Royal and Fountains	Pond	1728	11 June 1986	SE2803468872; 54°06′54″N 1°34′22″W	1150612	Moon and Crescent Ponds More images
Ripon Gates at East of Studley Park, with Flanking Walls and Lodges	Studley Park, Lindrick with Studley Royal and Fountains	Gate	Early 18th century	6 March 1967	SE2887569897; 54°07′27″N 1°33′35″W	1173509	Ripon Gates at East of Studley Park, with Flanking Walls and Lodges More images
The Cottage about 100m North-east of Church of St Mary with front Garden Wall and Gate	Lindrick with Studley Royal and Fountains	Timber Framed House	c. 1873	11 June 1986	SE2763869363; 54°07′10″N 1°34′43″W	1150601	The Cottage about 100m North-east of Church of St Mary with front Garden Wall and Gate More images
The Octagon Tower	Studley Park, Lindrick with Studley Royal and Fountains	Tower	1728–32	6 March 1967	SE2806468977; 54°06′57″N 1°34′20″W	1296001	The Octagon Tower More images
Weir at North End of the Canal, with Piers, Fishing Pavilions and Balustrade	Studley Park, Lindrick with Studley Royal and Fountains	Balustrade	1716–1728	6 March 1967	SE2802569063; 54°07′00″N 1°34′22″W	1173821	Weir at North End of the Canal, with Piers, Fishing Pavilions and Balustrade More images
Fountaine's Hospital	Linton	Almshouse	1721	10 September 1954	SD9970962683; 54°03′36″N 2°00′21″W	1132124	Fountaine's Hospital More images
Busby Hall	Little Busby	Country House	Pre 1764	5 May 1952	NZ5154304093; 54°25′47″N 1°12′25″W	1151369	Busby Hall More images
The Old Nursery Wing at Busby Hall	Little Busby	Service Wing	16th century	30 October 1990	NZ5155904112; 54°25′47″N 1°12′24″W	1151370	The Old Nursery Wing at Busby Hall
Walled Garden to South East of Busby Hall	Little Busby	Walled Garden	Late 18th century	30 October 1990	NZ5160904042; 54°25′45″N 1°12′22″W	1189298	Upload Photo
Langton Hall	Langton Park, Little Langton	House	c. 1770	11 April 1986	SE3037295266; 54°21′07″N 1°32′03″W	1188451	Upload Photo
Thompson Mausoleum about 20m South West of the Church of the Holy Trinity	Little Ouseburn	Mausoleum	Mid 18th century	15 March 1966	SE4520661119; 54°02′39″N 1°18′40″W	1293613	Thompson Mausoleum about 20m South West of the Church of the Holy Trinity More images
Hollin Hall	Littlethorpe	Country House	Late 17th century	6 March 1967	SE3131767286; 54°06′02″N 1°31′21″W	1293955	Upload Photo
Long Marston Hall	Long Marston	House	Late 17th century	2 September 1952	SE5010651313; 53°57′20″N 1°14′17″W	1150330	Long Marston Hall
Dale End Mill	Lothersdale	Mill	1795	31 October 1988	SD9596445902; 53°54′33″N 2°03′47″W	1132272	Dale End Mill More images
Stone Gappe	Lothersdale	House	1725	10 September 1954	SD9679245751; 53°54′28″N 2°03′01″W	1167086	Stone Gappe More images
Coleby Hall	Grange, Low Abbotside	Manor House	1655	9 July 1986	SD9329991154; 54°18′57″N 2°06′16″W	1316922	Upload Photo
Worsall Hall	Low Worsall	House	Early 18th century	5 May 1952	NZ3925410136; 54°29′06″N 1°23′44″W	1294600	Worsall Hall More images
Mulgrave Castle and Screen Walls to North	Lythe	Country House	Before 1735	6 October 1969	NZ8478912557; 54°30′05″N 0°41′32″W	1148891	Upload Photo
Stable Building to North of Mulgrave Castle	Lythe	Stable	1787	6 October 1969	NZ8475612623; 54°30′07″N 0°41′34″W	1179666	Upload Photo
Malton Lodge	Malton	House	1993	29 September 1951	SE7897471756; 54°08′08″N 0°47′34″W	1201941	Malton Lodge More images
Screen Wall about 35m north-west of Malton Lodge	Malton	Wall	c. 1604	29 September 1951	SE7895071784; 54°08′09″N 0°47′35″W	1219922	Screen Wall about 35m north-west of Malton Lodge
Talbot Hotel	Malton	Hotel	19th century	29 September 1951	SE7847171564; 54°08′02″N 0°48′02″W	1202751	Talbot Hotel More images
Garden Wall and Gateway attached to North West Corner of the Talbot Hotel	Malton	Gate	Early 18th century	29 September 1951	SE7840371565; 54°08′02″N 0°48′06″W	1290826	Garden Wall and Gateway attached to North West Corner of the Talbot Hotel
Retaining wall and steps for the main terrace to the west of the Talbot Hotel	Malton	Wall	Early 18th century	5 April 1993	SE7844871544; 54°08′02″N 0°48′03″W	1290839	Upload Photo
The Cross Keys Public House	Malton	Public House	Earlier than late 18th century	29 September 1951	SE7864971818; 54°08′10″N 0°47′52″W	1202741	The Cross Keys Public House More images
York House	Malton	Apartment	1993	29 September 1951	SE7852071578; 54°08′03″N 0°47′59″W	1290865	York House More images
Forecourt Walls, Railings, Gate and Gate Piers at York House	Malton	Gate	Early 18th century	29 September 1951	SE7852071585; 54°08′03″N 0°47′59″W	1202749	Forecourt Walls, Railings, Gate and Gate Piers at York House
Pedimented archway and wall, Yorkersgate	Malton	Gate	Early 18th century	29 September 1951	SE7845771592; 54°08′03″N 0°48′03″W	1282012	Pedimented archway and wall, Yorkersgate More images
Old Abbey and attached Outbuildings	Old Malton, Malton	House	Late 17th century	29 September 1951	SE7986172484; 54°08′31″N 0°46′44″W	1201924	Old Abbey and attached Outbuildings More images
How Hill Tower and Outbuildings, also called the Chapel of Saint Michael De Monte	Markington with Wallerthwaite	Chapel/Gaming House	Medieval	13 March 1986	SE2760067052; 54°05′55″N 1°34′46″W	1293874	How Hill Tower and Outbuildings, also called the Chapel of Saint Michael De Monte More images
Marrick Priory Farmhouse	Marrick Priory, Marrick	Farmhouse	Earlier	7 December 1966	SE0668697759; 54°22′31″N 1°53′55″W	1130821	Marrick Priory Farmhouse More images
Marske Hall	Marske	Apartment	Late 16th century or early 17th century	19 December 1951	NZ1038200345; 54°23′54″N 1°50′30″W	1157772	Marske Hall More images
Gledstone Hall and forecourt walls, pavilions and gates	Martons Both	Apartments	1922–26	31 October 1988	SD8868551277; 53°57′27″N 2°10′26″W	1296985	Gledstone Hall and forecourt walls, pavilions and gates More images
Terraces at Gledstone Hall	Martons Both	Garden wall	1923	31 October 1988	SD8870351203; 53°57′24″N 2°10′25″W	1316750	Upload Photo
Ingthorpe Grange	Martons Both	House	1672	10 September 1954	SD8926552024; 53°57′51″N 2°09′54″W	1296906	Ingthorpe Grange More images
Old Gledstone	Martons Both	House	c.1770	10 September 1954	SD8831350770; 53°57′10″N 2°10′46″W	1132251	Upload Photo
Paradise	Low Row, Melbecks	House	1653	21 April 1986	SD9822997884; 54°22′35″N 2°01′44″W	1301785	Paradise More images
East Hall	Middleton Tyas	House	1713	4 February 1969	NZ2280905987; 54°26′56″N 1°38′59″W	1157407	Upload Photo
Middleton Lodge	Middleton Tyas	Country House	1777–1780	4 February 1969	NZ2235106825; 54°27′23″N 1°39′24″W	1317085	Middleton Lodge More images
Monk Fryston Hall	Monk Fryston	House	13th century	18 January 1952	SE5061629855; 53°45′45″N 1°14′01″W	1148544	Monk Fryston Hall More images
Prebendal House	Monk Fryston	House	c. 1425	11 December 1967	SE5050329709; 53°45′41″N 1°14′07″W	1296762	Prebendal House More images
Langlands	Morton-on-Swale	Farmhouse	Mid to late 18th century	27 August 1986	SE3288490946; 54°18′47″N 1°29′46″W	1315094	Langlands More images
Ivelet Bridge	Ivelet, Muker	Bridge	Late 16th century	7 December 1966	SD9331097798; 54°22′32″N 2°06′16″W	1179137	Ivelet Bridge More images
Oxnop Hall	Low Oxnop, Muker	Farmhouse	1685	7 December 1966	SD9310497390; 54°22′19″N 2°06′28″W	1131529	Oxnop Hall More images
West Lodge Gateway to Thornton Stud with flanking Walls, Gate, Railings and End Piers	Newsham with Breckenbrough	Gate	Late 18th century	20 June 1966	SE3931784506; 54°15′17″N 1°23′53″W	1315174	West Lodge Gateway to Thornton Stud with flanking Walls, Gate, Railings and End Piers More images
West Lodge to Thornton Stud	Newsham with Breckenbrough	Lodge	Late 18th century	20 June 1966	SE3935684536; 54°15′18″N 1°23′51″W	1150821	West Lodge to Thornton Stud More images
Newton Kyme Hall	Newton Kyme cum Toulston	Country House	17th century	4 July 1952	SE4654144908; 53°53′54″N 1°17′36″W	1132467	Newton Kyme Hall More images
Durham House	Northallerton	House	c. 1754	23 April 1952	SE3688094069; 54°20′27″N 1°26′03″W	1189096	Durham House More images
Middle Parks Farmhouse	North Stainley with Sleningford	House	14th century	22 February 1982	SE3019675084; 54°10′14″N 1°32′20″W	1150584	Middle Parks Farmhouse More images
Stainley Hall	North Stainley with Sleningford	Country House	1715	23 April 1952	SE2870976522; 54°11′01″N 1°33′42″W	1174130	Upload Photo
Gateway adjacent to Wath Lodge	Norton Conyers House	Gate	Mid to late 18th century	22 July 1955	SE3214676898; 54°11′13″N 1°30′32″W	1150022	Gateway adjacent to Wath Lodge More images
Norton Conyers House	Norton Conyers	House	Medieval	22 July 1955	SE3198976245; 54°10′52″N 1°30′41″W	1150059	Norton Conyers House More images
Stable Block with Wall and Gate Piers about 200m to west of Norton Conyers House	Norton Conyers	House	Late 18th century	22 July 1955	SE3188776321; 54°10′54″N 1°30′47″W	1173056	Stable Block with Wall and Gate Piers about 200m to west of Norton Conyers House More images
Scow Hall	Norwood	House	16th century	22 November 1966	SE2011552378; 53°58′02″N 1°41′42″W	1150430	Scow Hall More images
Statue of a Sailors Moll and Pedestal about 20m south of the Priory	Nun Monkton	Statue	Early 18th century	27 August 1987	SE5120057886; 54°00′52″N 1°13′13″W	1191022	Statue of a Sailors Moll and Pedestal about 20m south of the Priory
Statue of Fame and Pedestal about 35m north-east of the Priory	Nun Monkton	Statue	Early 18th century	27 August 1987	SE5119757954; 54°00′54″N 1°13′13″W	1150347	Statue of Fame and Pedestal about 35m north-east of the Priory
Statue of Girl with Birds Nest and Pedestal about 30m east of the Priory	Nun Monkton	Statue	Early 18th century	27 August 1987	SE5120557898; 54°00′52″N 1°13′12″W	1150345	Statue of Girl with Birds Nest and Pedestal about 30m east of the Priory
Statue of Mars and Pedestal about 40m south of the Priory	Nun Monkton	Statue	Early 18th century	27 August 1987	SE5122957920; 54°00′53″N 1°13′11″W	1150346	Upload Photo
Statue of Minerva and Pedestal about 40m east of the Priory	Nun Monkton	Statue	Early 18th century	27 August 1987	SE5122257918; 54°00′53″N 1°13′11″W	1315385	Upload Photo
Statue of Shepherd with Pipe and Pedestal about 20m south-west of the Priory	Nun Monkton	Statue	Early 18th century	27 August 1987	SE5117157882; 54°00′52″N 1°13′14″W	1191014	Statue of Shepherd with Pipe and Pedestal about 20m south-west of the Priory
Statue of the Buccaneer and Pedestal about 20m south of the Priory	Nun Monkton	Statue	Early 18th century	27 August 1987	SE5118557882; 54°00′52″N 1°13′13″W	1315384	Statue of the Buccaneer and Pedestal about 20m south of the Priory
Statue of the Haymaker and Pedestal about 35m north of the Priory	Nun Monkton	Statue	Early 18th century	27 August 1987	SE5117757944; 54°00′54″N 1°13′14″W	1293538	Upload Photo
The Priory	Nun Monkton	House	c. 1660	8 March 1952	SE5117457910; 54°00′53″N 1°13′14″W	1315383	The Priory More images
Weir and Salmon Ladder	Linton Lock, Nun Monkton	Weir	c. 1767	20 October 1986	SE4998760019; 54°02′01″N 1°14′18″W	1293712	Weir and Salmon Ladder
Nunnington Bridge	Nunnington	Bridge	Early 18th century	14 July 1955	SE6692779470; 54°12′24″N 0°58′31″W	1315700	Nunnington Bridge More images
Oswaldkirk Hall	Oswaldkirk	House	c. 1690	4 January 1955	SE6186278925; 54°12′08″N 1°03′11″W	1149583	Oswaldkirk Hall More images
Dalesend	Patrick Brompton	Country House	Early 18th century	13 February 1967	SE2203790681; 54°18′41″N 1°39′46″W	1301373	Upload Photo
Beck Isle Museum	Pickering	House	Late 18th century	12 May 1969	SE7960884161; 54°14′49″N 0°46′47″W	1315853	Beck Isle Museum More images
Plompton Hall and flanking Walls	Plompton	Country House	c. 1760	8 March 1952	SE3572154009; 53°58′51″N 1°27′24″W	1149836	Plompton Hall and flanking Walls More images
Stables to Plompton Hall	Plompton Hall, Plompton	House	c. 1757	15 March 1966	SE3570354013; 53°58′51″N 1°27′25″W	1191416	Stables to Plompton Hall More images
Cappleside Barn	Rathmell	Barn	1714	13 August 2018	SD8042959202; 54°01′42″N 2°18′01″W	1449248	Cappleside Barn More images
Draycott Hall	Fremington, Reeth, Fremington and Healaugh	Apartment	Late 18th century	7 December 1966	SE0459898951; 54°23′10″N 1°55′51″W	1317107	Draycott Hall More images
The Manor House	Riccall	House	c. 1480	25 October 1951	SE6157638077; 53°50′07″N 1°03′57″W	1172683	Upload Photo
Garden Wall, Gates and Gate Piers at Hill House	Richmond	Gate	18th century	15 October 1973	NZ1746301284; 54°24′24″N 1°43′57″W	1240977	Upload Photo
Hill House	Richmond	House	Earlier	1 August 1952	NZ1744401307; 54°24′25″N 1°43′58″W	1260753	Hill House More images
King's Head Hotel	Richmond	Hotel	late C17/early 18th century	1 August 1952	NZ1715300931; 54°24′13″N 1°44′14″W	1240397	King's Head Hotel More images
Old Grand Stand	Old Race Course, Richmond	Grandstand	c. 1775	1 August 1952	NZ1596702194; 54°24′54″N 1°45′20″W	1131277	Old Grand Stand More images
The Bar	Richmond	Town Wall	c. 1312	1 August 1952	NZ1703200737; 54°24′07″N 1°44′21″W	1211647	The Bar More images
The Cross	Richmond	Obelisk	1771	1 August 1952	NZ1709900879; 54°24′11″N 1°44′17″W	1240522	The Cross More images
The Eleanor Bowes Hospital	Richmond	Almshouse	1607	1 August 1952	NZ1757401284; 54°24′24″N 1°43′51″W	1289900	The Eleanor Bowes Hospital More images
Green Bridge	Richmond	Bridge	1789	1 August 1952	NZ1695600605; 54°24′02″N 1°44′25″W	1318388	Green Bridge More images
The Grove	Richmond	Town House	1750	1 August 1952	NZ1726901010; 54°24′15″N 1°44′08″W	1318419	The Grove More images
The Temple	Richmond	Pele Tower	Earlier than c1746	1 August 1952	NZ1671200737; 54°24′07″N 1°44′39″W	1131225	The Temple More images
21 Trinity Church Square	Richmond	House	Early 18th century	1 August 1952	NZ1717500871; 54°24′11″N 1°44′13″W	1096972	21 Trinity Church Square More images
15 Bridge Street	Richmond	House	Early 18th century	1 August 1952	NZ1695900704; 54°24′05″N 1°44′25″W	1131259	15 Bridge Street More images
47 Newbiggin	Richmond	House	18th century	1 August 1952	NZ1684200936; 54°24′13″N 1°44′31″W	1240776	47 Newbiggin More images
58 and 59 Market Place	Richmond	House	Mid 18th century	1 August 1952	NZ1724300870; 54°24′11″N 1°44′09″W	1240521	58 and 59 Market Place More images
9 Market Place	Richmond	House	Early 18th century	1 August 1952	NZ1717200928; 54°24′13″N 1°44′13″W	1240394	9 Market Place More images
Wrought iron gates and stone gate piers to Temple Grounds	Richmond	Gateway	1730s	1 August 1952	NZ1677600949; 54°24′13″N 1°44′35″W	1318414	Wrought iron gates and stone gate piers to Temple Grounds
Orangery with flanking Walls, Bothys, Glasshouse and Pavilions at Ripley Castle	Ripley Park, Ripley	Bothy	c. 1785	15 March 1966	SE2839260747; 54°02′31″N 1°34′05″W	1315394	Orangery with flanking Walls, Bothys, Glasshouse and Pavilions at Ripley Castle More images
Stables, Coach Houses and Service Buildings to North and East of Courtyard at Ripley Castle with South Wall to Gate House	Ripley Park, Ripley	Bothy	Begun 1786	18 May 1987	SE2827260595; 54°02′26″N 1°34′11″W	1174114	Stables, Coach Houses and Service Buildings to North and East of Courtyard at Ripley Castle with South Wall to Gate House
Weeping Cross about 5m north of Church of All Saints	Ripley	Cross	Medieval	15 March 1966	SE2833960518; 54°02′24″N 1°34′08″W	1315369	Weeping Cross about 5m north of Church of All Saints More images
Bishopton Lodge	Ripon	Stewards House	Mid 18th century	27 May 1949	SE3005670895; 54°07′59″N 1°32′29″W	1296147	Upload Photo
Deans Croft	Ripon	House	1685	27 May 1949	SE3156071317; 54°08′12″N 1°31′06″W	1315485	Deans Croft More images
Gazebos in Gardens of Nos 7 & 8, Park Street	Ripon	Gazebo	Early 18th century	27 May 1949	SE3094571350; 54°08′13″N 1°31′40″W	1150140	Gazebos in Gardens of Nos 7 & 8, Park Street More images
Minster House	Ripon	House	18th century	27 May 1949	SE3140371072; 54°08′04″N 1°31′15″W	1149408	Minster House More images
Remains of mediaeval St Anne's Hospital	Ripon	Ruin	14th century	27 May 1949	SE3146271005; 54°08′02″N 1°31′12″W	1174023	Remains of mediaeval St Anne's Hospital More images
Ripon Town Hall	Ripon	Town Hall	1799	27 May 1949	SE3121071216; 54°08′09″N 1°31′26″W	1174370	Ripon Town Hall More images
St Agnes House	Ripon	House	1693	27 May 1949	SE3152571026; 54°08′03″N 1°31′08″W	1149395	St Agnes House More images
The Court House	Ripon	Court House	1830	27 May 1949	SE3140071202; 54°08′09″N 1°31′15″W	1174464	The Court House More images
The Old Deanery	Ripon	Deanery	Mid 17th century	27 May 1949	SE3147671185; 54°08′08″N 1°31′11″W	1150165	The Old Deanery More images
The Old Hall	Ripon	House	1738	27 May 1949	SE3145771029; 54°08′03″N 1°31′12″W	1149393	The Old Hall More images
The Wakeman's House	Ripon	House	16th century	27 May 1949	SE3117171234; 54°08′10″N 1°31′28″W	1295808	The Wakeman's House More images
Thorpe Prebend House	Ripon	Clergy House	Mid 17th century	27 May 1949	SE3143070996; 54°08′02″N 1°31′14″W	1295988	Thorpe Prebend House More images
County Hall	Romanby	Offices	1904–1914	5 June 1987	SE3658293192; 54°19′59″N 1°26′20″W	1150967	County Hall More images
Hog Hall	Sawley	House	16th century	6 March 1967	SE2558568071; 54°06′28″N 1°36′37″W	1251471	Hog Hall More images
Richmond railway station	St Martin's	Booking Office	c. 1846	4 March 1969	NZ1765200870; 54°24′11″N 1°43′47″W	1157668	Richmond railway station More images
Deer Park House	Scampston Hall Estate, Scampston	House	1768	14 December 1987	SE8725074483; 54°09′32″N 0°39′55″W	1295449	Upload Photo
Palladian Bridge about 90m north-east of Scampston Hall	Scampston Hall Estate, Scampston	Summerhouse	c. 1775	10 October 1966	SE8657875593; 54°10′08″N 0°40′31″W	1175313	Palladian Bridge about 90m north-east of Scampston Hall More images
Scampston Hall and Gateways, Walls and Terminal Piers attached to South Front	Scampston Hall Estate, Scampston	Country House	Late 17th century	20 September 1957	SE8647275529; 54°10′06″N 0°40′37″W	1315717	Scampston Hall and Gateways, Walls and Terminal Piers attached to South Front More images
Cliff End House	Scarborough	House	latter part of 18th century	22 December 1953	TA0434388324; 54°16′48″N 0°23′56″W	1258208	Cliff End House More images
Crescent House the Art Gallery	Scarborough	Villa	late 1840s	8 June 1973	TA0417588199; 54°16′44″N 0°24′05″W	1273502	Crescent House the Art Gallery More images
Wessex Court	Scarborough	Terrace	circa 1840–50	22 December 1953	TA0429387976; 54°16′36″N 0°23′59″W	1258434	Wessex Court More images
Natural History Museum (Woodend)	Scarborough	Villa	1835–40	22 December 1953	TA0412488154; 54°16′42″N 0°24′08″W	1258213	Natural History Museum (Woodend) More images
St Martin's Vicarage	Scarborough	Vicarage	probably later	8 June 1973	TA0418587715; 54°16′28″N 0°24′06″W	1258210	St Martin's Vicarage More images
The Grand Hotel	Scarborough	Hotel	1863-7	8 June 1973	TA0439888403; 54°16′50″N 0°23′53″W	1243163	The Grand Hotel More images
The Museum	Scarborough	Museum	1828–29	22 December 1953	TA0431988265; 54°16′46″N 0°23′57″W	1273293	The Museum More images
The Spa	Scarborough	Belvedere	18th century	8 June 1973	TA0444787853; 54°16′32″N 0°23′51″W	1259818	The Spa More images
The Talbot Hotel	Scarborough	House	mid to late 18th century	22 December 1953	TA0433388756; 54°17′02″N 0°23′56″W	1259106	The Talbot Hotel More images
Trinity House	Scarborough	Almshouse	1832	8 June 1973	TA0460488790; 54°17′03″N 0°23′41″W	1243198	Trinity House More images
Belvoir Terrace	Scarborough	House	1832–33 to 1856-7	22 December 1953	TA0413288336; 54°16′48″N 0°24′08″W	1258211	Belvoir Terrace More images
14a, 14b and 17 St Nicholas Street	Scarborough	Apartment	early to mid 18th century	22 December 1953	TA0436288569; 54°16′56″N 0°23′55″W	1243164	14a, 14b and 17 St Nicholas Street More images
1–14 The Crescent	Scarborough	Terrace	1832–33 to 1856-7	22 December 1953	TA0410588197; 54°16′44″N 0°24′09″W	1258212	1–14 The Crescent More images
23 and 24 King Street	Scarborough	House	Mid 18th century	22 December 1953	TA0440488630; 54°16′58″N 0°23′52″W	1258560	Upload Photo
37 and 39 Eastborough	Scarborough	House	18th century	22 December 1953	TA0460388718; 54°17′00″N 0°23′41″W	1258403	37 and 39 Eastborough More images
7 Queen Street	Scarborough	House	Late 18th century	22 December 1953	TA0435988719; 54°17′00″N 0°23′55″W	1259104	7 Queen Street More images
The Three Mariners	Scarborough	House	Late 17th century	22 December 1953	TA0502488827; 54°17′03″N 0°23′18″W	1259085	The Three Mariners More images
5 Queen Street	Scarborough	House	Late 18th century	22 December 1953	TA0436688707; 54°17′00″N 0°23′54″W	1259087	5 Queen Street More images
32 Queen Street	Scarborough	House	Late 18th century	22 December 1953	TA0432088840; 54°17′04″N 0°23′57″W	1259109	32 Queen Street More images
9 Tuthill	Scarborough	House	early to mid 18th century	8 June 1973	TA0478488844; 54°17′04″N 0°23′31″W	1243443	Upload Photo
2 Quay Street	Scarborough	Timber Framed House	C15/C16	22 December 1953	TA0485488831; 54°17′04″N 0°23′27″W	1259086	Upload Photo
45 Quay Street	Scarborough	House	C15/C16	22 December 1953	TA0501088831; 54°17′04″N 0°23′19″W	1259084	45 Quay Street More images
Scotton Old Hall	Scotton	House	17th century	8 March 1952	SE3253059558; 54°01′52″N 1°30′18″W	1150318	Scotton Old Hall More images
Former Sandes Soldiers' Home, Catterick Garrison	Scotton	Large building	20th century	25 July 2024	SE1839097662; 54°22′27″N 1°43′06″W	1488335	Upload Photo
Home Farmhouse	Old Scriven, Scriven	House	C18-C19	15 March 1966	SE3479558398; 54°01′14″N 1°28′14″W	1263238	Home Farmhouse More images
Abbots Staith Buildings	Selby	Shop	Late 17th century or early 18th century	16 December 1952	SE6158932555; 53°47′08″N 1°04′00″W	1167663	Abbots Staith Buildings More images
Corunna House	Selby	House	Early 18th century	16 December 1952	SE6166632458; 53°47′05″N 1°03′56″W	1132559	Corunna House More images
Riding School about 25m north-west of Settrington House	Settrington	Riding School	1793	25 April 1986	SE8392670218; 54°07′16″N 0°43′03″W	1149512	Riding School about 25m north-west of Settrington House More images
Old Hall Cottage, Sexhow Hall	Sexhow	Cross Wing House	Late Medieval	23 June 1966	NZ4766506175; 54°26′55″N 1°15′59″W	1315279	Upload Photo
Sharow Cross	Sharow	Cross	13th century	6 March 1967	SE3235271977; 54°08′33″N 1°30′23″W	1149835	Sharow Cross More images
Sheriff Hutton Castle	Sheriff Hutton	Castle	1382	25 January 1954	SE6517066257; 54°05′17″N 1°00′19″W	1149592	Sheriff Hutton Castle More images
Manor House	Skeeby	House	Early-Mid 17th century	19 December 1951	NZ2002902612; 54°25′07″N 1°41′34″W	1157732	Manor House More images
Devonshire Hotel	Skipton	Hotel	18th century	28 April 1952	SD9907351571; 53°57′37″N 2°00′56″W	1157440	Devonshire Hotel More images
Skipwith Hall	Skipwith	House	Early 18th century	25 October 1951	SE6596838522; 53°50′20″N 0°59′56″W	1172750	Skipwith Hall More images
Rudby Hall	Hutton Rudby, Skutterskelfe	Apartment	1838	23 June 1966	NZ4837207084; 54°27′25″N 1°15′19″W	1150627	Rudby Hall More images
Thorp Perrow Hall	Snape with Thorp	House	Early 18th century	22 August 1966	SE2621785437; 54°15′50″N 1°35′56″W	1190139	Thorp Perrow Hall More images
Pigeon House about 120m north of Stockeld Park House	Spofforth with Stockeld	Dovecote	1758–63	11 July 1983	SE3717449428; 53°56′23″N 1°26′07″W	1315562	Upload Photo
Spofforth Castle, Ruins	Spofforth with Stockeld	Fortified House	13th century	22 February 1985	SE3602751100; 53°57′17″N 1°27′09″W	1149976	Spofforth Castle, Ruins More images
The Old Stable Court to Stapleton Park	Stapleton	Stable	c. 1762	11 December 1967	SE5067619296; 53°40′04″N 1°14′04″W	1316346	The Old Stable Court to Stapleton Park
Steeton Hall Farm	Steeton	House	c. 1494	12 July 1985	SE5330344237; 53°53′30″N 1°11′26″W	1301050	Steeton Hall Farm More images
Moreby Hall	Stillingfleet	Country House	1828–1832	17 November 1966	SE5961843227; 53°52′55″N 1°05′40″W	1148506	Moreby Hall More images
Barclays Bank	Stokesley	House	Early 18th century	4 August 1983	NZ5236908587; 54°28′12″N 1°11′37″W	1189196	Barclays Bank More images
Handyside Cottage & Handyside House	Stokesley	House	Palladian	23 June 1966	NZ5219708415; 54°28′06″N 1°11′46″W	1294309	Handyside Cottage & Handyside House More images
Manor House (Public Library and Court House) and Wall adjoining	Stokesley	House	Early 18th century	5 May 1952	NZ5258908627; 54°28′13″N 1°11′24″W	1189314	Manor House (Public Library and Court House) and Wall adjoining More images
The Old Rectory	Stokesley	House	Early 18th century	5 May 1952	NZ5263808395; 54°28′06″N 1°11′22″W	1294334	The Old Rectory More images
Swinden Hall	Swinden	Farmhouse	c.1600	20 February 1958	SD8610754417; 53°59′08″N 2°12′48″W	1296668	Swinden Hall More images
Swinton Castle	Swinton Park, Swinton with Warthermarske	Country House	18th century	9 August 1966	SE2118579724; 54°12′46″N 1°40′36″W	1167546	Swinton Castle More images
The Ark	Tadcaster	House	15th century	4 July 1952	SE4858043397; 53°53′04″N 1°15′45″W	1167475	The Ark More images
The Old Vicarage	Tadcaster	Hall House	Late 13th century	18 May 1992	SE4853843383; 53°53′04″N 1°15′47″W	1132450	The Old Vicarage More images
Front Garden Wall with Gate Piers at Osgoodby Hall	Thirkleby High and Low with Osgodby	Gate	1970s	1 May 1952	SE4920680916; 54°13′18″N 1°14′49″W	1150697	Front Garden Wall with Gate Piers at Osgoodby Hall
Osgoodby Hall	Thirkleby High and Low with Osgodby	House	16th century	1 May 1952	SE4924180902; 54°13′17″N 1°14′47″W	1190852	Osgoodby Hall More images
Thirsk Hall	Thirsk	Town House	1720	1 May 1952	SE4273282253; 54°14′03″N 1°20′45″W	1151319	Thirsk Hall More images
Old Hall	Town Head, Thoralby	House	1641	25 March 1969	SD9951686594; 54°16′30″N 2°00′32″W	1179924	Upload Photo
The Hall	Thornton-le-Dale	Hall House	Earlier	10 November 1953	SE8364783063; 54°14′11″N 0°43′05″W	1241248	The Hall More images
Old Thornville	Thornville	Country House	Mid-Late 17th century	15 March 1966	SE4563054698; 53°59′11″N 1°18′20″W	1294065	Upload Photo
Thorpe Underwood Hall	Thorpe Underwoods	Country House	1902–03	15 January 1980	SE4632959252; 54°01′38″N 1°17′39″W	1315423	Thorpe Underwood Hall More images
The Old Hall	Ugthorpe	House	1586	19 February 1952	NZ7945111024; 54°29′18″N 0°46′30″W	1173451	Upload Photo
Old Hall Farmhouse	Walden Stubbs	Farmhouse	17th century	25 March 1968	SE5488616861; 53°38′43″N 1°10′16″W	1174475	Old Hall Farmhouse More images
Brockfield	Warthill	House	1804	29 January 1953	SE6630454980; 53°59′12″N 0°59′25″W	1149101	Brockfield More images
Baysdale Abbey Bridge	Baysdale, Westerdale	Bridge	Medieval	6 October 1969	NZ6204106774; 54°27′09″N 1°02′41″W	1316276	Baysdale Abbey Bridge More images
Bee House to west of Dale Head Farmhouse and Wall to left	Westerdale	Bee Bole	1832	20 December 1990	NZ6777204442; 54°25′51″N 0°57′24″W	1316282	Bee House to west of Dale Head Farmhouse and Wall to left More images
Old Ralph Cross	Ledging Hill, Westerdale	Wayside Cross	11th century	20 December 1990	NZ6741901991; 54°24′32″N 0°57′46″W	1179098	Old Ralph Cross More images
Young Ralph Cross	Ledging Hill, Westerdale	Wayside Cross	11th century	6 October 1969	NZ6772202093; 54°24′35″N 0°57′29″W	1148563	Young Ralph Cross More images
Harlsey Castle Farmhouse	West Harlsey	Farmhouse	19th century	18 March 1983	SE4147898082; 54°22′36″N 1°21′47″W	1315142	Harlsey Castle Farmhouse
Stables at Harlsey Castle Farmhouse	West Harlsey	Stables	Early 15th century	31 March 1970	SE4148898066; 54°22′35″N 1°21′46″W	1188946	Stables at Harlsey Castle Farmhouse
Hauxwell Hall	Hauxwell Hall, West Hauxwell	Country House	Late 17th century	13 February 1967	SE1618193335; 54°20′07″N 1°45′10″W	1301772	Hauxwell Hall More images
Barn, later Coach-house and Stables, about 20m south of Weston Hall	Weston	Barn	17th century	22 November 1966	SE1776846677; 53°54′57″N 1°43′52″W	1150439	Barn, later Coach-house and Stables, about 20m south of Weston Hall
Westow Hall	Westow	House	Late 17th century	20 September 1951	SE7541965170; 54°04′37″N 0°50′56″W	1175258	Westow Hall More images
Swinithwaite Hall	Swinithwaite, West Witton	Country House	1767	13 February 1967	SE0456589240; 54°17′56″N 1°55′53″W	1179461	Swinithwaite Hall More images
Bagdale Old Hall	Whitby	Hotel	1883	23 February 1954	NZ8964610826; 54°29′06″N 0°37′04″W	1148376	Bagdale Old Hall More images
Ewe Cote Hall	Ewe Cote, Whitby	House	1697	23 February 1954	NZ8785610795; 54°29′06″N 0°38′43″W	1148252	Ewe Cote Hall
Garden Walls to Ewe Cote Hall	Ewe Cote, Whitby	Garden Wall	1697	23 February 1954	NZ8786410766; 54°29′05″N 0°38′43″W	1204632	Upload Photo
Ruswarp Hall	Ruswarp, Whitby	House	Late 17th century	23 February 1954	NZ8892809335; 54°28′18″N 0°37′45″W	1205169	Ruswarp Hall More images
Garden Wall and Gate Piers to Ruswarp Hall (Nos 4 and 6)	Ruswarp, Whitby	Gate Pier	Late 17th century	4 December 1972	NZ8891109326; 54°28′17″N 0°37′46″W	1148235	Garden Wall and Gate Piers to Ruswarp Hall (Nos 4 and 6)
Low Stakesby Mansion	Whitby	Country House	18th century	23 February 1954	NZ8902510731; 54°29′03″N 0°37′39″W	1316349	Upload Photo
Old Town Hall	Whitby	Town Hall	1788	23 February 1954	NZ9000411168; 54°29′16″N 0°36′44″W	1261706	Old Town Hall More images
1–6 St Hilda's Terrace	Whitby	House	Early 19th century	23 February 1954	NZ8942410992; 54°29′11″N 0°37′16″W	1253837	1–6 St Hilda's Terrace
7–10 St Hilda's Terrace	Whitby	House	19th century	23 February 1954	NZ8945110986; 54°29′11″N 0°37′15″W	1253838	7–10 St Hilda's Terrace
11 and 12 St Hilda's Terrace	Whitby	Terrace	Late 18th century	23 February 1954	NZ8948010986; 54°29′11″N 0°37′13″W	1253839	Upload Photo
13 and 14 St Hilda's Terrace	Whitby	Terrace	Late 18th century	23 February 1954	NZ8949610985; 54°29′11″N 0°37′12″W	1253840	Upload Photo
15 and 16 St Hilda's Terrace	Whitby	Terrace	Late 18th century	23 February 1954	NZ8951110988; 54°29′11″N 0°37′11″W	1253878	15 and 16 St Hilda's Terrace
St Hilda	Whitby	House	19th century	23 February 1954	NZ8953210990; 54°29′11″N 0°37′10″W	1253879	Upload Photo
18 and 19 St Hilda's Terrace	Whitby	Terrace	Late 18th century	23 February 1954	NZ8954310990; 54°29′11″N 0°37′10″W	1261567	Upload Photo
20 St Hilda's Terrace	Whitby	Terrace	Late 18th century	23 February 1954	NZ8956010991; 54°29′11″N 0°37′09″W	1261568	Upload Photo
21 St Hilda's Terrace	Whitby	Terrace	Late 18th century	23 February 1954	NZ8959211006; 54°29′11″N 0°37′07″W	1253883	21 St Hilda's Terrace
22 St Hilda's Terrace	Whitby	Terrace	Late 18th century	23 February 1954	NZ8959211006; 54°29′11″N 0°37′06″W	1261569	22 St Hilda's Terrace
23 St Hilda's Terrace	Whitby	Government Office	Late 18th century	4 December 1972	NZ8962511010; 54°29′11″N 0°37′05″W	1253884	23 St Hilda's Terrace
24 St Hilda's Terrace	Whitby	House	Late 18th century	23 February 1954	NZ8963811014; 54°29′12″N 0°37′04″W	1261570	24 St Hilda's Terrace
25 St Hilda's Terrace	Whitby	Terrace	Late 18th century	23 February 1954	NZ8966711028; 54°29′12″N 0°37′03″W	1253886	25 St Hilda's Terrace
19 Grape Lane	Whitby	House	Late 18th century	23 February 1954	NZ9001111043; 54°29′12″N 0°36′43″W	1204530	19 Grape Lane More images
Ruins of Whorlton Castle Undercrofts	Whorlton	Castle	14th century	30 October 1990	NZ4809002485; 54°24′56″N 1°15′38″W	1189310	Ruins of Whorlton Castle Undercrofts
Womersley Park and adjoining Coach-house and Stables	Womersley	Country House	17th century	1 December 1967	SE5329418985; 53°39′53″N 1°11′42″W	1316344	Womersley Park and adjoining Coach-house and Stables More images
Wykeham Abbey	Wykeham	Country House	Mid 18th century	13 December 1951	SE9618281914; 54°13′26″N 0°31′34″W	1173210	Wykeham Abbey More images
