= St Agnes Lodge =

Building in Ripon, North Yorkshire, England

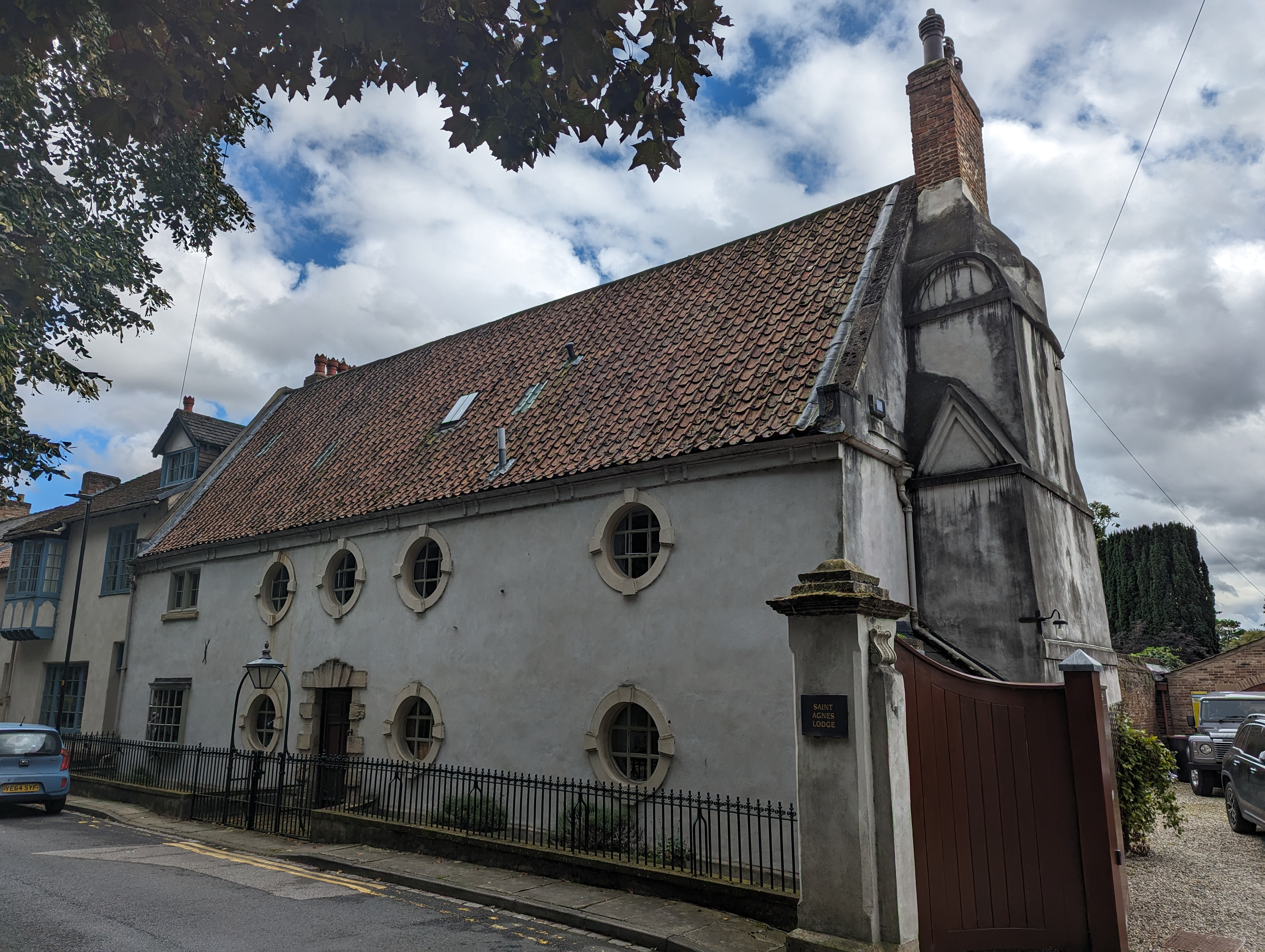
The building, in 2023

St Agnes Lodge, also known as St Agnes House, is a historic building in Ripon, a city in North Yorkshire, in England.

The house was probably built in the mid 17th century. The work reused roof timbers from an earlier house, built about 1540. The front, to St Agnesgate, was rebuilt in 1693, the woodwork undertaken by Abraham Smith. Around the late 18th and early 19th century, it was owned by Richard Browne, the vicar of nearby Ripon Minster. In the mid 19th century, the east end of the front range was remodelled in the Gothic style, the work including new windows and a conservatory, which were removed in the late 20th century, a new garden room replacing the conservatory. The house was grade II* listed in 1949.

The house is built of roughcast brick and has a pantile roof. It has two storeys and attics, and is five bays wide. The doorway has a heavily rusticated surround. There are five circular windows, each with four keystones, a bow window, and a horizontally sliding sash window. On the west end is a large projecting chimney breast with two segmental pediments. At the rear is a two-storey one-bay wing with a shaped gable. Inside, there is panelling from the late 17th century, and the staircase and three fireplaces are of similar date. Two of these have 17th-century paintings set into their overmantels. The main roof is a cruck frame, while the rear wing has a king post roof.

== See also ==
- Grade II* listed buildings in North Yorkshire (district)
- Listed buildings in Ripon
