= Yew Tree House =

Historic building in Cawood, England

Coordinates: 53°49′55″N 1°07′33″W

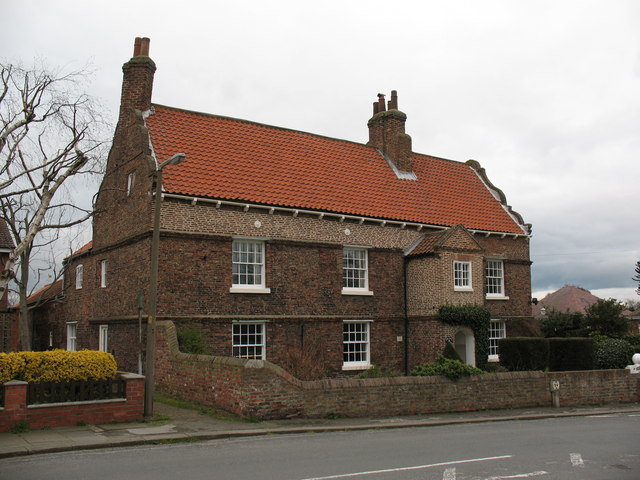
The house, in 2007

Yew Tree House is a historic building in Cawood, a village in North Yorkshire, in England.

The house was originally built in the mid to late 17th century. Stables were added in the 18th century, and in the 19th century a two-storey block was added, linking the house to the stables. There were further additions in the 20th century, and the property was divided into two houses. The entire building was Grade II* listed in 1966.

The house is built of brick with stone dressings, floor bands, and a pantile roof with Dutch gables. It has two storeys and an attic, a front of three bays, and at the rear is a stair tower, and two two-storey outshuts, one linking with the two-storey three-bay former stable block. On the front is a two-storey porch with a moulded pediment, containing a segmental-arched entrance. The windows on the front are sashes, some horizontally-sliding. In the left gable end is a blocked mullioned window. Inside, there are moulded beams in some ground floor rooms, and some also have early sliding shutters.

== See also ==
- Grade II* listed buildings in North Yorkshire (district)
- Listed buildings in Cawood
