= The Grove, Richmond =

Building in Richmond, North Yorkshire, England

Coordinates: 54.4042°N 1.7354°W

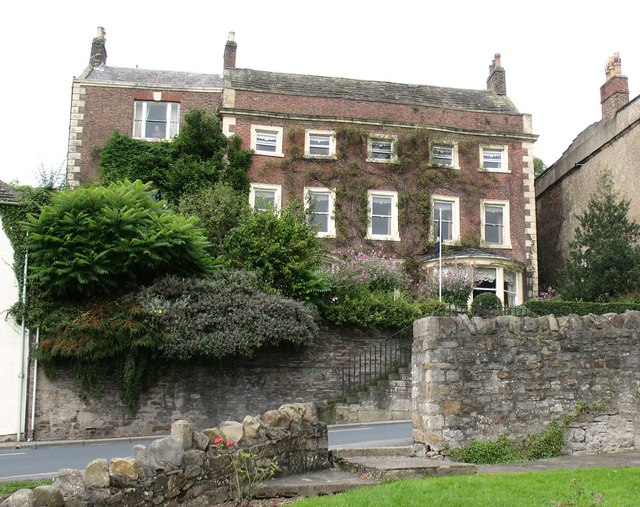
The building, in 2008

The Grove is a historic building in Richmond, North Yorkshire, a town in England.

The house was built in 1750 by Caleb Readshaw, the mayor of Richmond. It lies on Frenchgate, raised above the road, behind a small garden with prominent trees. It is accessed up a flight of steps, which Richmondshire District Council described as a "significant feature" of the area. Bow windows were added later, probably in the early 19th century. The building was grade II* listed in 1952.

The large house is built of red brick, with chamfered stone quoins, a moulded stone cornice, brick parapets with stone capping, and a slate roof. It has three storeys, a main block of five bays, and a recessed single-bay extension on the left. In the centre of the main block is a doorway with a moulded surround, a pulvinated frieze and a cornice. This is flanked by large semicircular bow windows, and the other windows on the main block are sashes with moulded stone frames. On the extension are three-light windows with rusticated keystones, and at the rear is a Venetian window.

== See also ==
- Grade II* listed buildings in North Yorkshire (district)
- Listed buildings in Richmond, North Yorkshire (north and outer areas)
