= Park Street Gazebos =

Structures in Ripon, North Yorkshire, England

Coordinates: 54°08′13″N 1°31′40″W

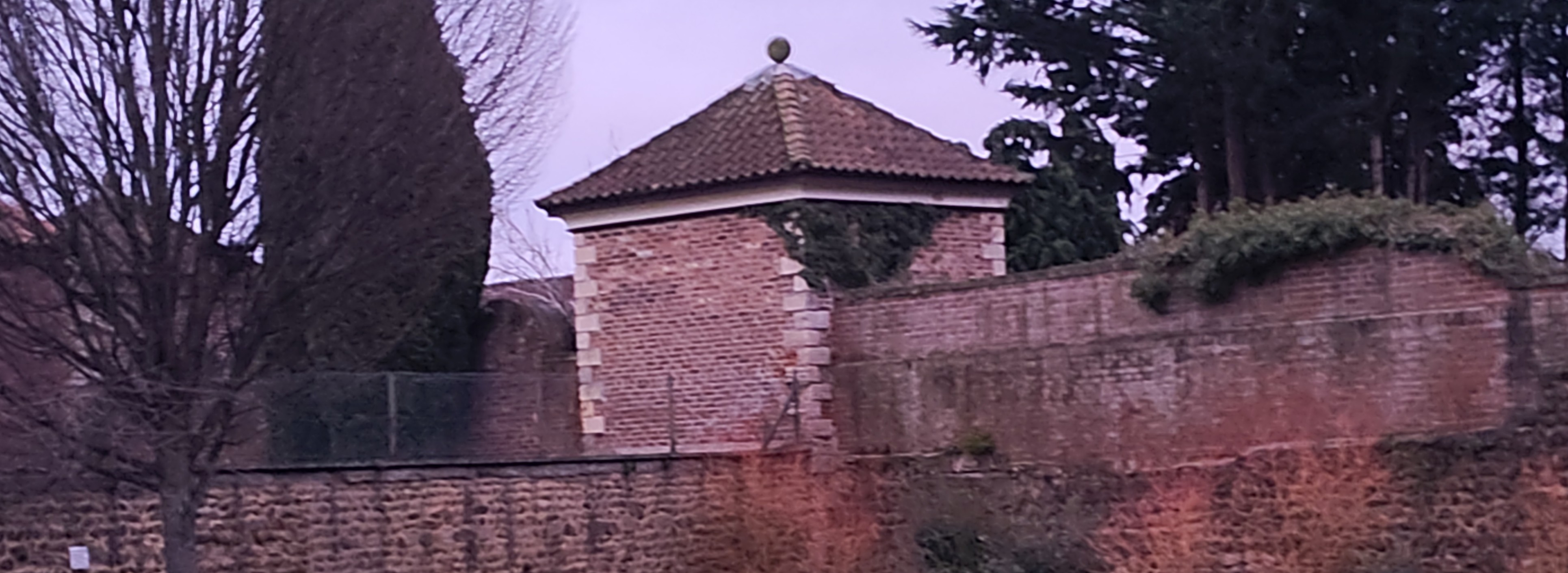
One of the gazebos and part of the connecting wall, in 2025

The Park Street Gazebos are a historic structure in Ripon, a city in North Yorkshire, in England.

The two gazebos were probably built shortly before 1719, in the garden of a house on Park Street, owned by the Baynes family. They were designed to provide a viewpoint over the surrounding area, and as a banqueting house. Perhaps in the mid 19th century, a wall with a raised walkway was constructed to connect the gazebos, although Historic England describes the wall as being apparently of the same date as the gazebos. The house was later divided into two properties, and the gazebos fell into ruin, the roofs having collapsed. Harrogate Town Council used a compulsory purchase order on the building and restored it in 1986. The building has been grade II* listed since 1949.

The gazebos are built of red brick, with stone dressings, and pyramidal pantile roofs with ball finials. They consist of two-storey pavilions with plaster coves, stone bands and rusticated quoins, and a door on the upper storey. Between them is a two-storey gallery, the ground floor with four bays containing semicircular arches with rusticated jambs and voussoirs. The upper floor has a balustrade, and piers with ornamental carving. At the rear are four niches with rusticated surrounds.

== See also ==
- Grade II* listed buildings in North Yorkshire (district)
- Listed buildings in Ripon
