= Swinden Hall =

Historic building in North Yorkshire, England

Coordinates: 53°59′08″N 2°12′48″W

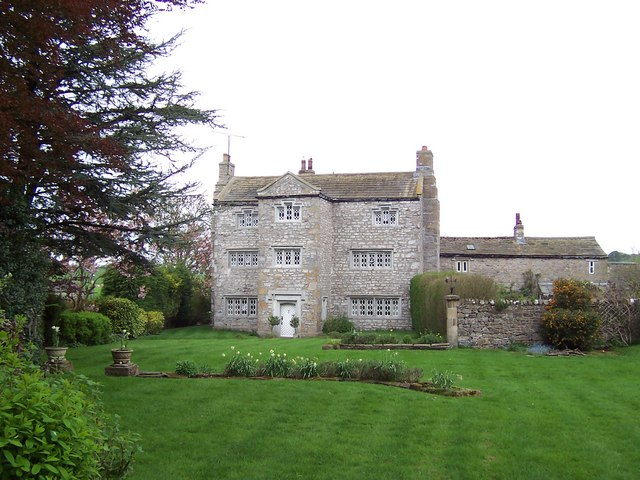
The building, in 2006

Swinden Hall is a historic building in Hellifield, a village in North Yorkshire, in England.

The oldest part of the building is the rear wing, which was constructed as a farmhouse in about 1600. In 1657, a new, larger, building was constructed immediately in front of the farmhouse, which was later converted into a dairy. At a later date, a new block was built, to connect the old farmhouse with the newer hall. The old farmhouse became a kitchen and service wing. Most of the windows were replaced in the early 19th century. The building was grade II* listed in 1958.

The house is built of stone with quoins and a stone slate roof. It has three storeys and three bays, the middle bay projecting as a full-height gabled porch. The doorway has a Tudor arch and a hood mould, its lintel scratched with initials and the date, although Nikolaus Pevsner considers that the inscription has been recarved. The windows have double-chamfered mullions, cast iron lozenge glazing and hood moulds, those in the top floor stepped with three lights. To the right is a previous farmhouse with two storeys and three bays. The interior has been altered, but retains some early fireplaces and beams, now plastered over.

== See also ==
- Grade II* listed buildings in North Yorkshire (district)
- Listed buildings in Hellifield
