= 37 and 39 Eastborough =

Building in Scarborough, North Yorkshire, England

Coordinates: 54.2834°N 0.3947°W

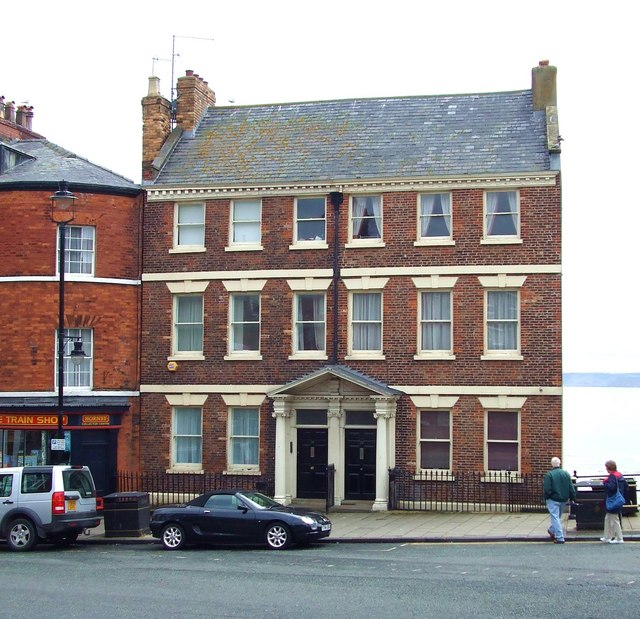
The building, in 2009

37 and 39 Eastborough is a historic building in Scarborough, North Yorkshire, a town in England.

Eastborough is the eastern section of the main street in Scarborough. 37 and 39 Eastborough is a pair of houses on the street, built in the 18th century. Nikolaus Pevsner praises the building's "really rich double doorcase", while Historic England notes that the building forms a group with the houses at 41 and 43 Eastborough. The building was grade II* listed in 1953.

The houses are built of red brick on a stone plinth, with floor bands, a bracketed cornice and a slate roof. They are three storeys high and together are six bays wide. In the centre is an Ionic porch with five pilasters and two columns, decorative and bracketed entablatures with a curved frieze, and a deep open pediment with enriched octagonal panels to the soffit. The tympanum over the doors contains vase and cornucopia ornament. The windows are sashes, those on the lower two floors with wedge lintels and keystones. In front are plain cast iron railings. Inside, they have been altered, but 37 retains its original staircase and some mahogany doors.

== See also ==
- Grade II* listed buildings in North Yorkshire (district)
- Listed buildings in Scarborough (Castle Ward)
