= 29 and 30 Regent Parade =

Listed building in Harrogate, England

Coordinates: 53.9978°N 1.5298°W

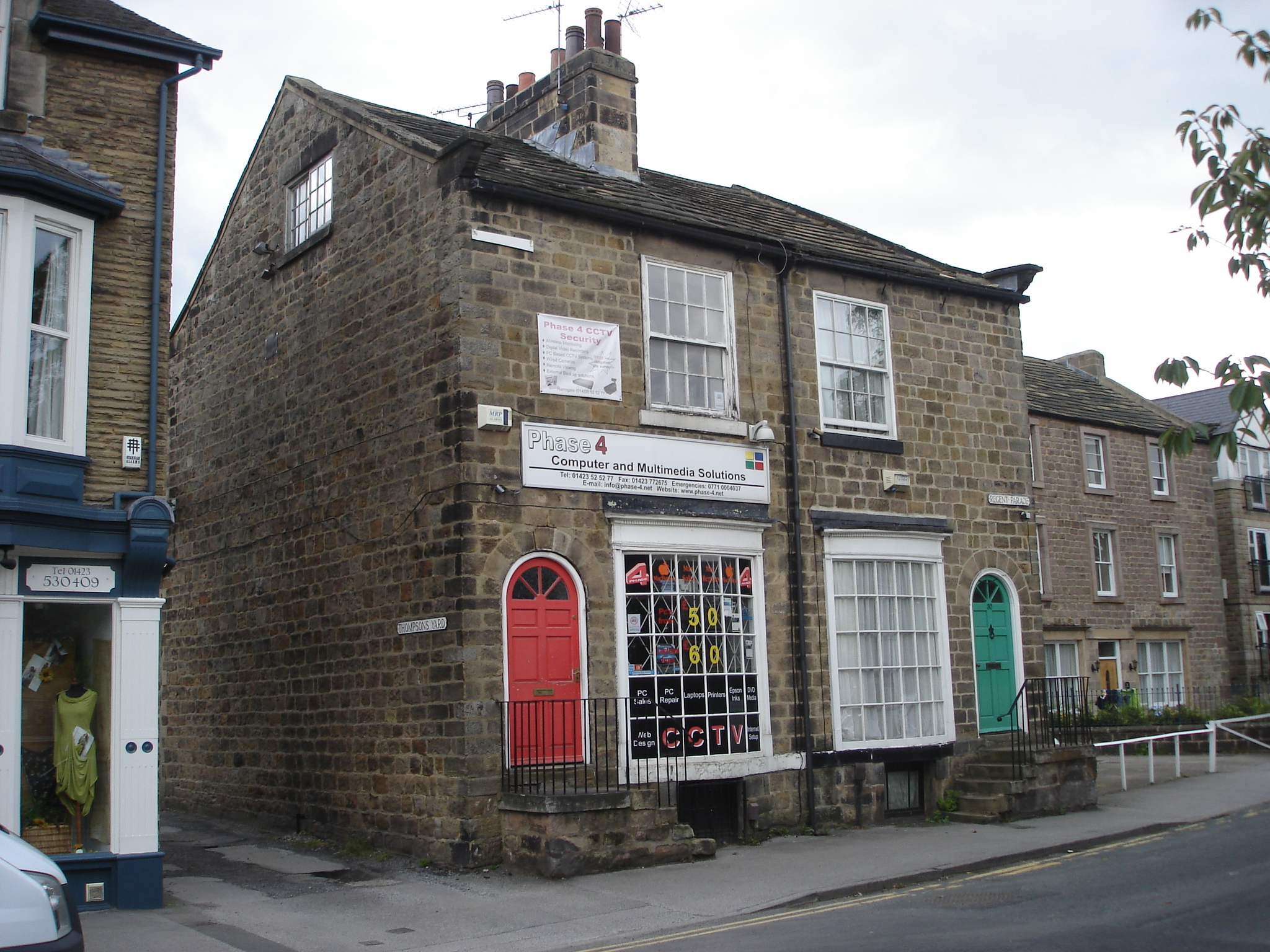
The building, in 2014

29 and 30 Regent Parade is a historic building in Harrogate, a town in North Yorkshire, in England.

The building was constructed in the late 18th century, as a pair of semi-detached shops. For the next century, this was the principal shopping street in the town. The building was grade II* listed in 1975, on account of its well-preserved historic shopfronts.

The shops are constructed of gritstone, with a slate roof, coped gables and kneelers. They have two storeys and a semi-basement, and each shop has one bay. Steps with wrought iron railings lead up to round-arched doorways in the outer parts. Between them are segmental bow windows with pilasters, an entablature, and a dentilled cornice, each containing the original 30 small panes. In the upper floor are sash windows.

== See also ==
- Grade II* listed buildings in North Yorkshire (district)
- Listed buildings in Harrogate (High Harrogate Ward)
