= 1–4 West Park =

Listed building in Harrogate, England

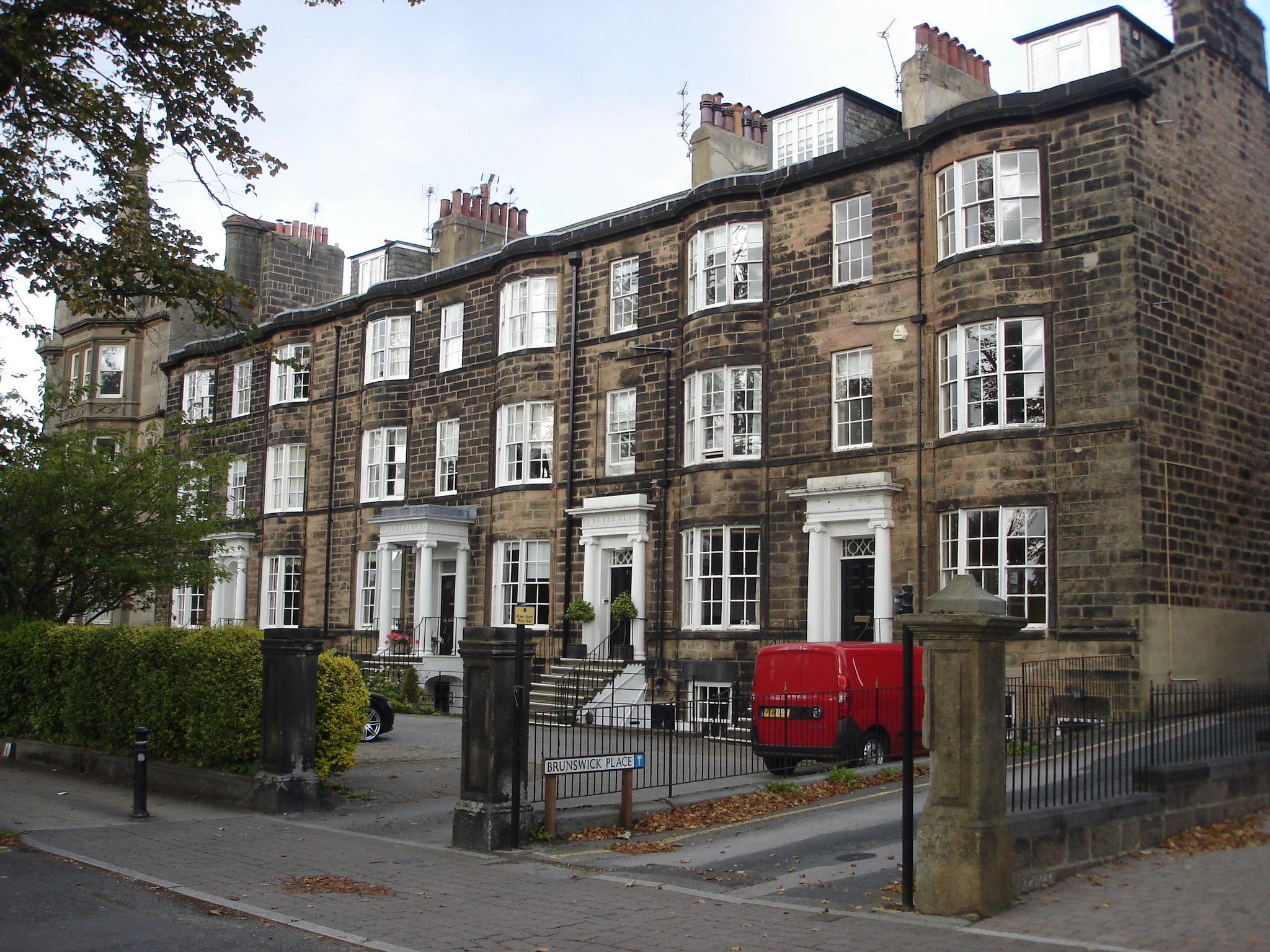
- The terrace in 2014

- Location in North Yorkshire

General information
- Location: Harrogate, North Yorkshire, England
- Coordinates: 53.9899°N 1.5407°W
- Year built: Early 19th century

Design and construction
- Designations

Listed Building – Grade II*
- Official name: 1 to 4, West Park
- Designated: 18 July 1949
- Reference no.: 1149400

1–4 West Park is a historic terrace in Harrogate, a town in North Yorkshire, England.

The terrace of four houses was built in the early 19th century, a period during which the spa town of Harrogate was growing rapidly. Nikolaus Pevsner identified the terrace as one of the best in the town, "a handsome terrace with Tuscan or Ionic doorways or porches". It was Grade II* listed in 1949.

The terrace is built of gritstone with cornices, blocking courses, and slate roofs. Each has three storeys and semi-basements, Nos. 1 and 2 have three bays, and Nos. 3 and 4 have two bays each. Flanking the entrance bays are full-height segmental bow windows, and the windows are sashes. No. 1 has a Doric doorcase, and a round-arched doorway with a radial fanlight, No. 2 has a prostyle Ionic portico with a decorated frieze, and a doorway with an architrave and a fanlight. Nos. 3 and 4 each has an Ionic doorcase and a doorway with a patterned fanlight. The entrances are approached by steps with cast iron railings.

== See also ==
- Grade II* listed buildings in North Yorkshire (district)
- Listed buildings in Harrogate (Low Harrogate Ward)
