= 21 Trinity Church Square =

Building in Richmond, North Yorkshire, England

Coordinates: 54.403°N 1.7369°W

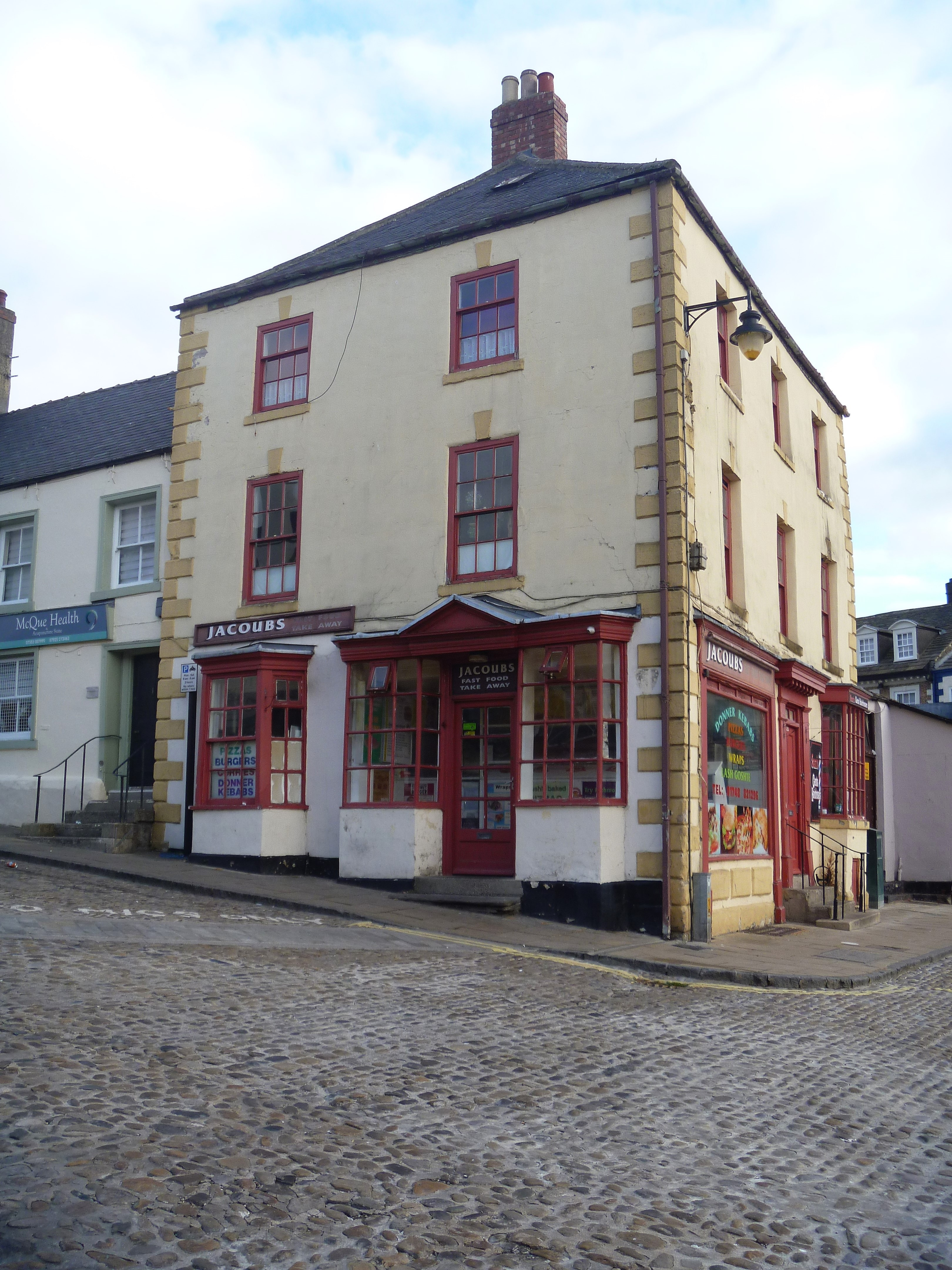
The building, in 2022

21 Trinity Church Square is a historic building in Richmond, North Yorkshire, a town in England.

The building was constructed in the early 18th century, and it retains its original shop front, alongside a bay window added in the early 19th century. The south window has a 19th-century doorway and late 19th-century shop window. It was grade II* listed in 1952, its high grade being on account of the shop fronts.

The shop is constructed of painted stucco on a plinth, with rusticated quoins and a Welsh slate roof. It has three storeys, three bays on the east front and two on the south front. The upper floors contain sash windows with keystones. On the south front is a canted bay window on the left. To the right is an 18th century shopfront containing a central door with a traceried fanlight, a moulded cornice, and a small pediment, on rendered stall risers. The east front has a 19th century shop window with a panelled base, and to the right is a doorway with pilasters and a dentilled cornice, approached by steps with iron handrails. Further to the right is a canted bay window with a dentilled cornice.

== See also ==
- Grade II* listed buildings in North Yorkshire (district)
- Listed buildings in Richmond, North Yorkshire (central area)
