= 14 and 17 St Nicholas Street =

Building in Scarborough, North Yorkshire, England

Coordinates: 54.2823°N 0.3990°W

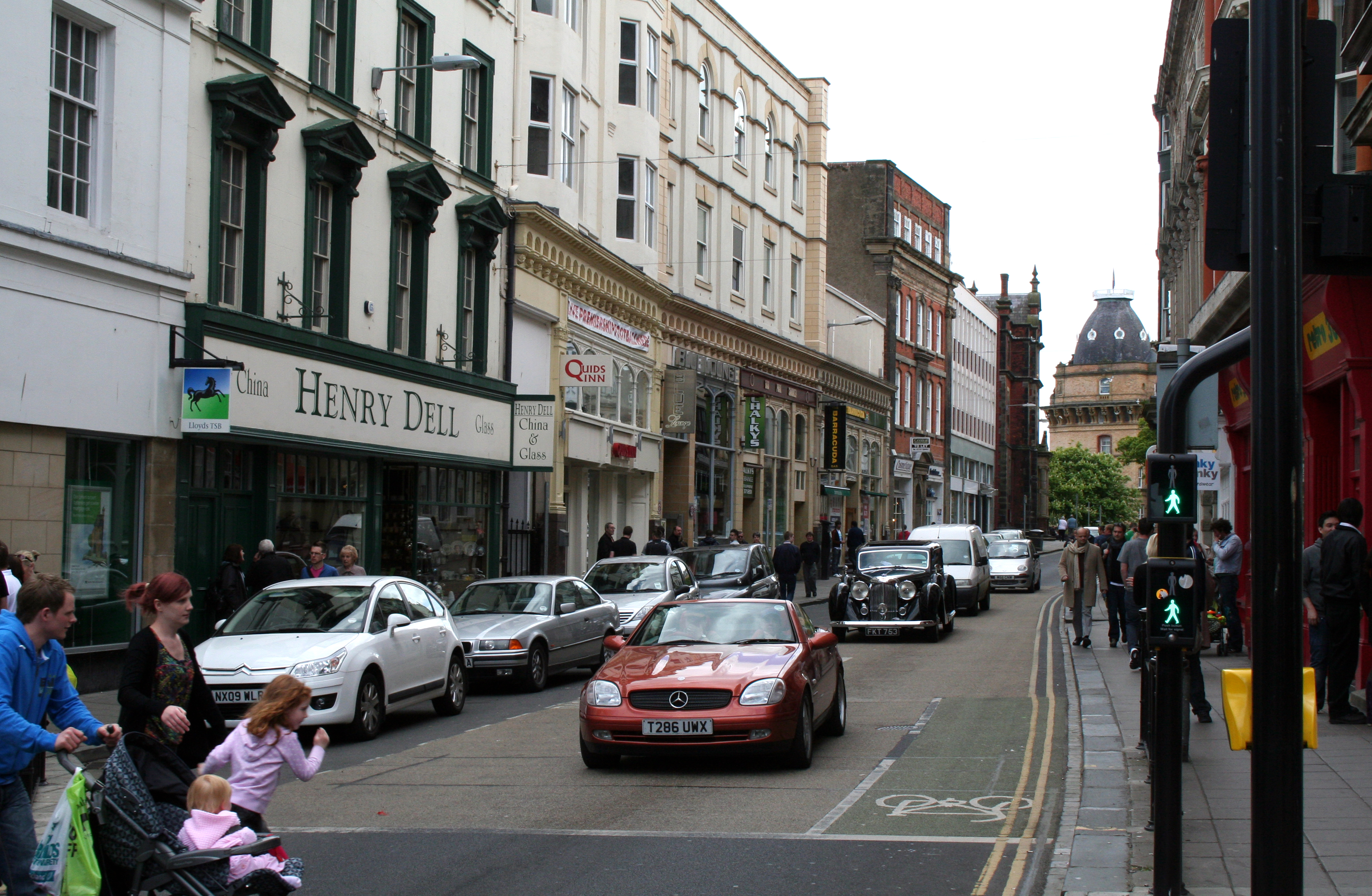
St Nicholas Street; 14 and 17 is the red brick building visible in the distance

14 and 17 St Nicholas Street is a historic building in Scarborough, North Yorkshire, a town in England.

The building was constructed in the early or mid 18th century, as a pair of large houses, one of which was for the Bell family. In the 20th century, the ground floor was converted into shops, and the upper floors into flats. The building was grade II* listed in 1953. The Victoria County History describes is as the finest domestic building of its date in the town.

The building is constructed of red brick, with flanking fluted stone Ionic pilasters, with carved capitals, an entablature, and a parapet with a moulded string course. It has four storeys and is five bays wide. In the centre is an arched doorway with fluted Ionic pilasters, an entablature, a curved frieze, a pediment and a mask keystone. Inside, steps lead to a recessed door with an arched fanlight, and the entrance is flanked by modern shopfronts. The windows are sashes with segmental heads and fluted keystones, those in the middle bay with architraves. Inside, both houses are accessed through the same central passageway, off which are doors, beyond which the original staircases survive. Several rooms retain their original panelling.

== See also ==
- Grade II* listed buildings in North Yorkshire (district)
- Listed buildings in Scarborough (Castle Ward)
