= Greengate, Whitby =

Building in North Yorkshire, England

Greengate
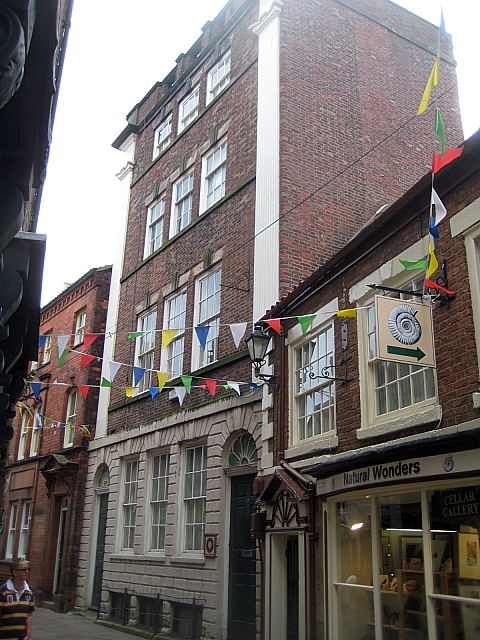
- The building in 2010

- Location within North Yorkshire

General information
- Location: Grape Lane, Whitby, North Yorkshire, England
- Coordinates: 54°29′12″N 0°36′44″W
- Year built: Late 18th century
- Renovated: 1960s (restored)

Listed Building – Grade II*
- Official name: 19, Grape Lane
- Designated: 23 February 1954
- Reference no.: 1204530

Greengate is a historic building on Grape Lane in Whitby, a town in North Yorkshire, England.

The house was built at what is now 19 Grape Lane in the late 18th century. The neighbouring building became the bank of Simpson, Chapman & Co in 1785, and 19 Grape Lane became a solicitors' office, which may have been linked to the bank by a connecting door. The bank was secured by a green gate, and hence was nicknamed the "Green Gate Bank". In the 1960s, 19 Grape Lane was purchased by Peter and Barbara Gross, who restored it. They found a safe on the premises and mistakenly thought that it was the old bank. As a result, they renamed it "Greengate". The house has been Grade II* listed since 1954.

The house has a ground floor in rusticated stone, and above it is in brick and surrounded by fluted ionic pilasters and an entablature. There are four storeys and a basement, and three bays. On the ground floor are three double-hung sash windows with triple keystones, and these are flanked by round-arched doorways with blank radiating spiked fanlights. The upper floors have sash windows with sill bands, a cornice, a parapet with open panels, and an octagonal lantern. At the rear is a doorway with an ornamental semicircular fanlight, a tall bottle window, and sash windows. Inside, there is panelling throughout the house and the original staircase survives. The 18th-century safe is in the first floor front room.

== See also ==
- Grade II* listed buildings in North Yorkshire (district)
- Listed buildings in Whitby (central area - east)
