= Talbot House, Scarborough =

Hotel in Scarborough, North Yorkshire, England

Coordinates: 54°17′02″N 0°23′56″W

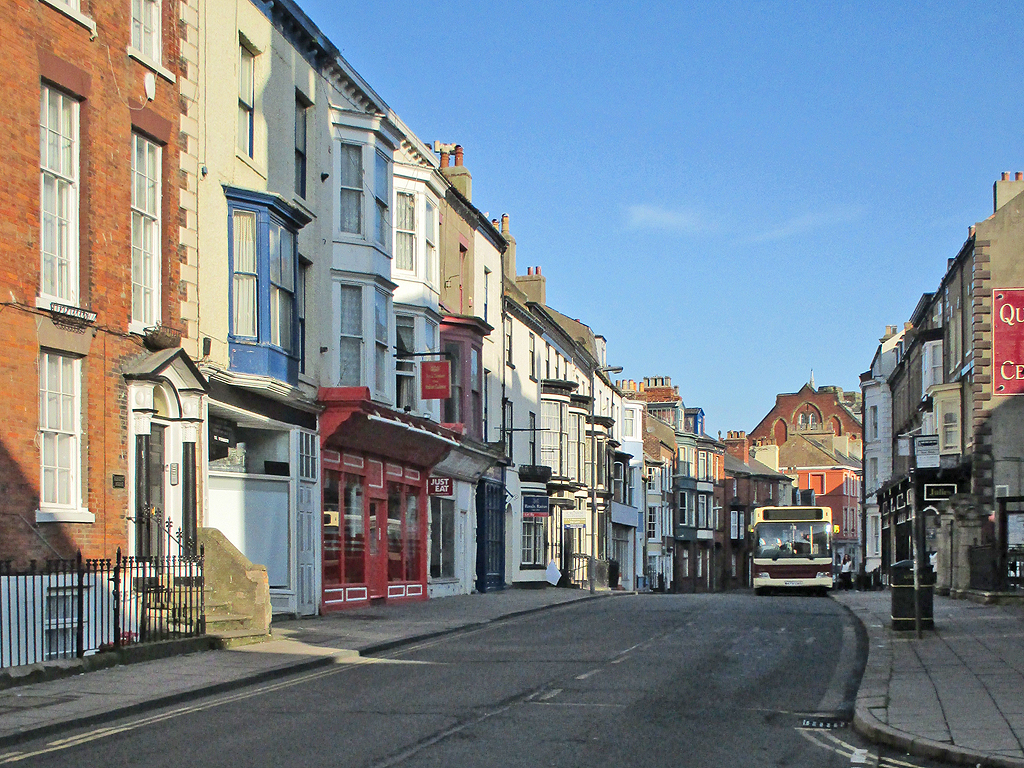
View of Queen Street; Talbot House is the black-and-white building in the centre

Talbot House is a historic building in Scarborough, North Yorkshire, a town in England.

Talbot House was built in the mid or late 18th century, on Queen Street in the centre of Scarborough. It was originally two separate houses, which were later combined to form the Talbot Hotel. In the early 19th century, it was extended to both left and right. The building was grade II* listed in 1953, and in the late 20th century was converted into a house.

The building is constructed of painted brick and has a slate roof. The central block has three storeys and a basement and four bays, floor bands, and an entablature with a triglyph frieze. There is a Greek Doric porch with fluted columns and an entablature, and to its left is a yard entrance infilled with a doorway. Above the porch is a bow window, and to the right is a two-storey bow window. The left extension has three storeys and two bays, and a bracketed frieze and cornice. The right bay contains a bow window with a moulded and dentilled cornice and iron cresting, and to its left is a plain round-arched doorway. The right extension has three storeys and a basement, and three bays. The doorway in the right bay has engaged Corinthian columns, a broken entablature, and an open pediment, and to its left is a two-storey canted bay window. The other windows in all parts are sashes, and the basement areas are enclosed by iron railings. Inside few original features remain other than one staircase.

== See also ==
- Grade II* listed buildings in North Yorkshire (district)
- Listed buildings in Scarborough (Castle Ward)
