= Kirkhill House =

House in Staithes, North Yorkshire, England

Coordinates: 54°33′30″N 0°47′24″W

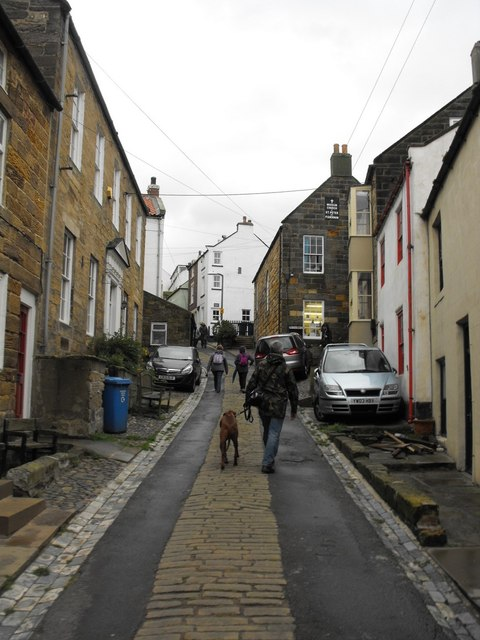
The house (on left), in 2013

Kirkhill House is a historic building in Staithes, a village in North Yorkshire, in England.

The house was built in about 1800, and is the largest property on Church Street, one of two historic routes into the village. In the mid-20th century, it served as a cafe, but was later reconverted into a house. It was grade II* listed in 1969.

The house is built of stone, and has a stone-coped pantile roof. There are two storeys and five bays. Five steps lead up to a doorway that has a Doric doorcase with fluted and reeded pilasters, and a pediment. The windows are sashes. to the left is an inserted doorway, and at the rear is a round-headed stair window. The area wall is in stone with moulded coping.

== See also ==
- Grade II* listed buildings in North Yorkshire (district)
- Listed buildings in Hinderwell
