= Cliff End House =

Building in Scarborough, North Yorkshire, England

Coordinates: 54.2799°N 0.3988°W

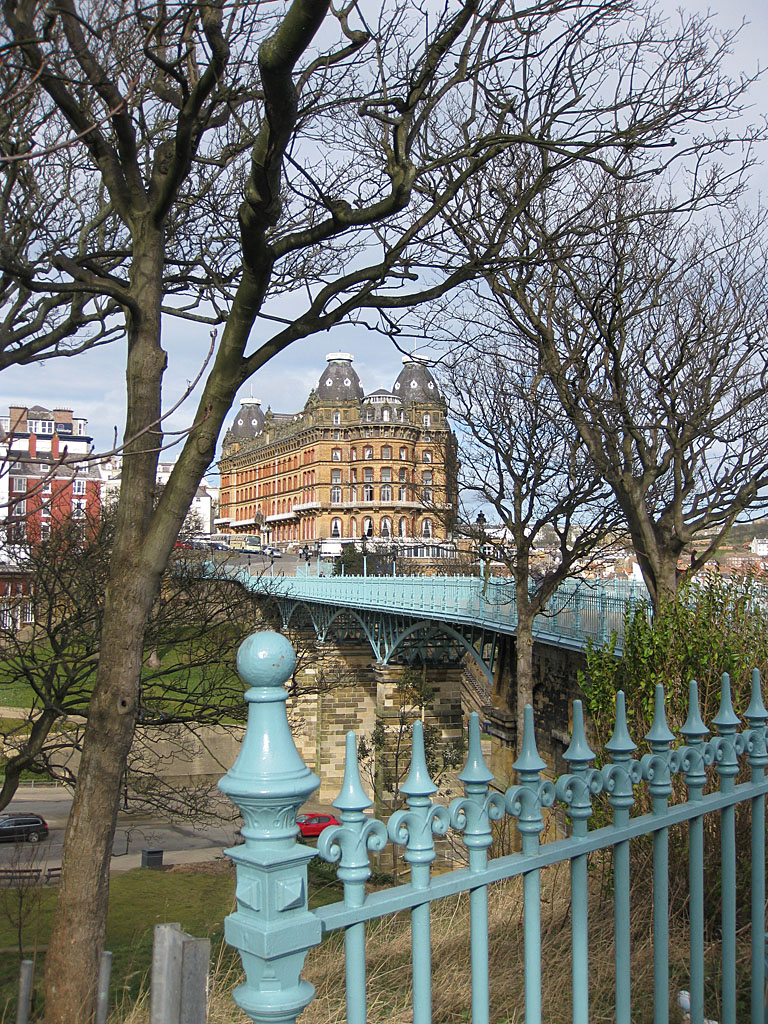
View from across Spa Bridge; Cliff End House is the red building on the far left

Cliff End House is a historic building in Scarborough, North Yorkshire, a town in England.

The house was probably built in the 1760s. It is an early example of a house built with sea views, though it is not solely oriented towards the sea. Historic England note that it forms part of an important group with Cliff Bridge Terrace. It was grade II* listed in 1953.

The house is built of painted brick with a dentilled cornice and a slate roof. The south front has four storeys and an attic, the east, entrance, front is gabled and has three storeys and an attic, and both fronts have three bays. The doorway in the right bay has panelled pilasters, a semicircular fanlight with an Ionic motif, fluted scroll brackets, a broken entablature and an open pediment. The windows are sashes, some tripartite, with flat stucco arches, the attic window on the entrance front has a round-arched head, and there are three dormers.

== See also ==
- Grade II* listed buildings in North Yorkshire (district)
- Listed buildings in Scarborough (Castle Ward)
