= Corunna House =

Historic house in North Yorkshire, England

Coordinates: 53.7848°N 1.0655°W

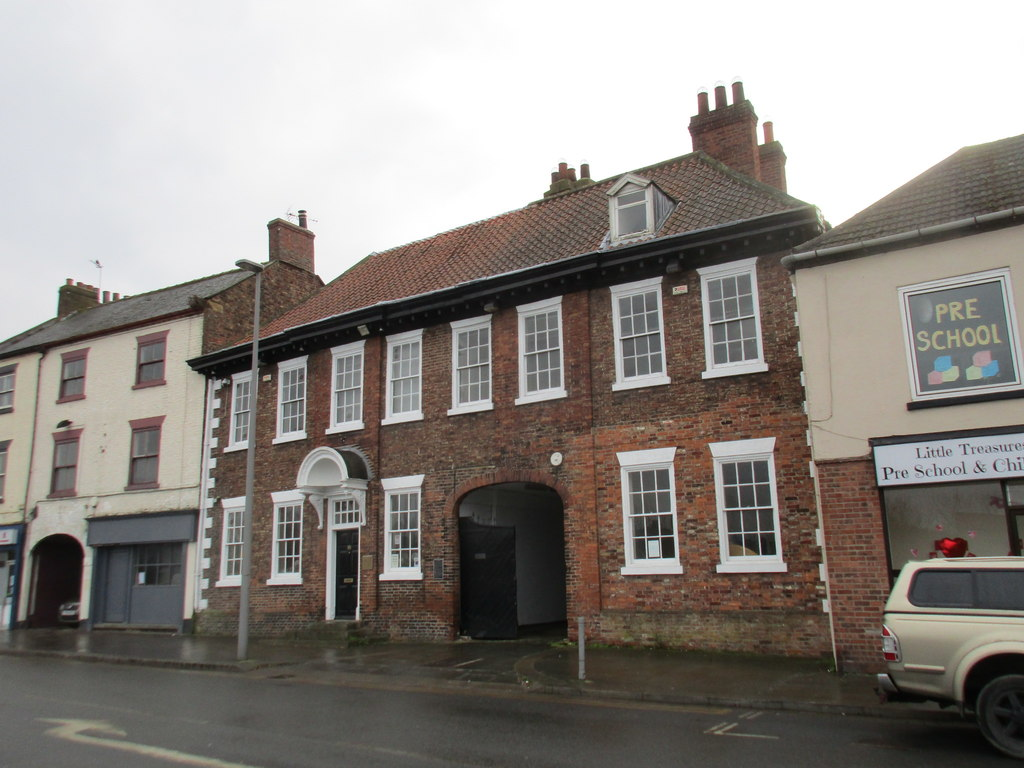
The building, in 2017

Corunna House is a historic building in Selby, in North Yorkshire, England.

The house lies on Water Lane, facing the River Ouse. It was built in the early 18th century, before 1724, for Richard Pearson. It had a variety of owners until the 1850s, when it was converted into the Ousegate School, which closed in 1926. It was then named "Corunna House", due to a purported connection with John Moore of La Coruna. Nikolaus Pevsner described the building as "the handsomest house in Selby". It was Grade II* listed in 1952.

The house is built of brown brick, with a pantile roof. It has brick quoins and a wooden cornice. It is eight bays wide, with the third bay coming slightly further forward, and incorporating the main entrance. This has a rectangular fanlight and large hood above. In the middle, there is a carriage entrance, which may be a later creation. The windows are sashes. The right-hand side had a 19th-century shop front, which has since been replaced with brick and two further sash windows.

== See also ==
- Grade II* listed buildings in North Yorkshire (district)
- Listed buildings in Selby
