= 15 Bridge Street =

Building in Richmond, North Yorkshire, England

Coordinates: 54°24′05″N 1°44′25″W

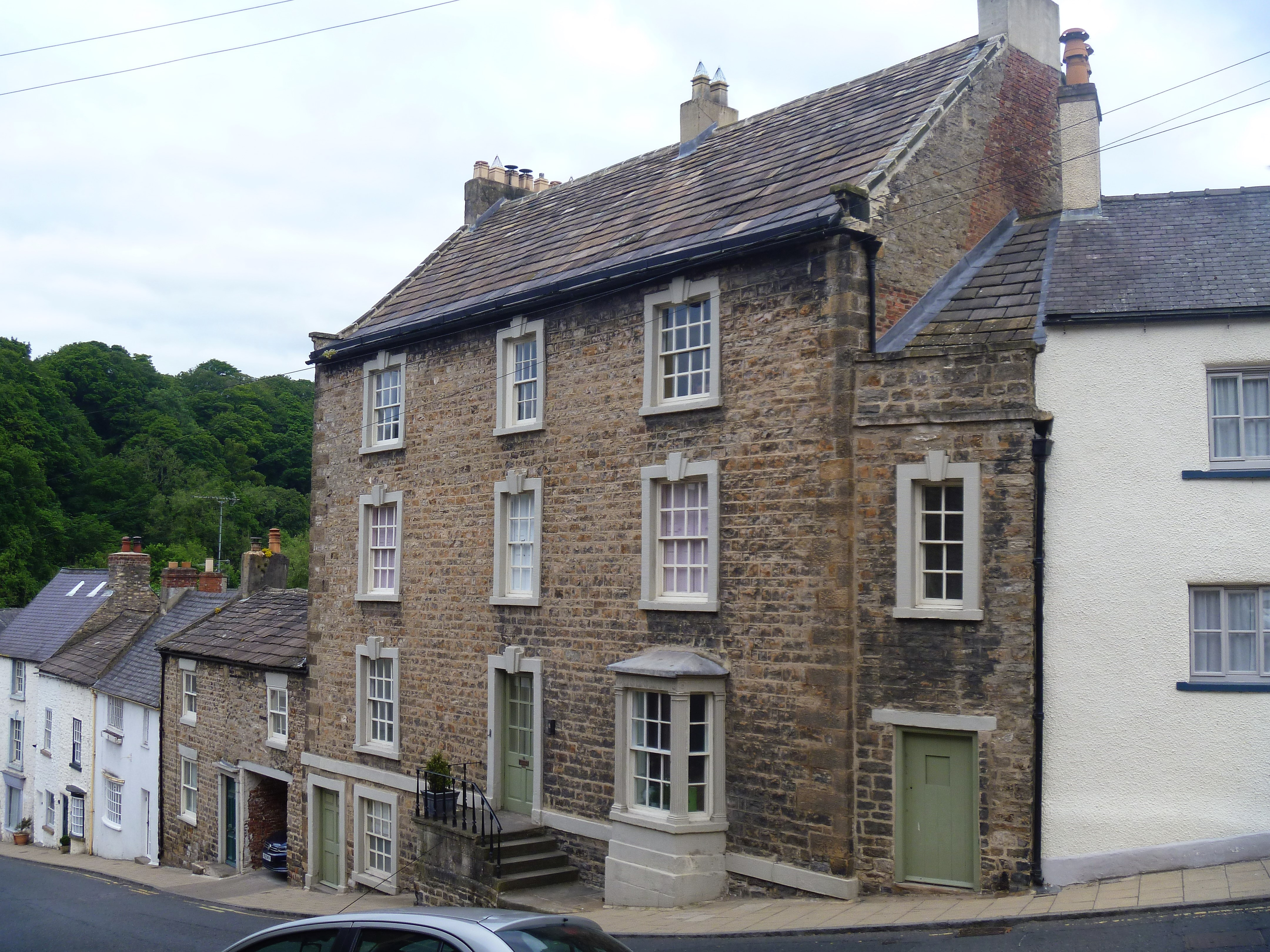
The building, in 2022

15 Bridge Street is a historic building in Richmond, North Yorkshire, a town in England.

The house was constructed in the early 18th century on the steep Bridge Street. A ground floor bay window was added in about 1800, and there is also an extension to the right-hand side. It is one of only four houses in the town with original 18th-century ironwork, and its interior is particularly well preserved; most of the original doors and some cupboard doors survive, along with most cornices, fireplaces, and a four-storey staircase described by Historic England as "magnificent". The building was grade II* listed in 1952.

The house is built of stone with a floor band and a stone slate roof with kneelers. It has four storeys on the left and three on the right, and three bays, and a narrow angled two-storey single-bay extension on the right. Steps lead up to the central doorway and to is right is a bay window with fluted pilasters and an ornamental frieze. The windows are sash windows in stone surrounds. The doorway and the windows on the upper three floors have rusticated keystones. The extension contains a doorway, above which is a window and a parapet.

== See also ==
- Grade II* listed buildings in North Yorkshire (district)
- Listed buildings in Richmond, North Yorkshire (central area)
