= Goodburn House =

Building in Richmond, North Yorkshire, England

Coordinates: 54°24′13″N 1°44′31″W

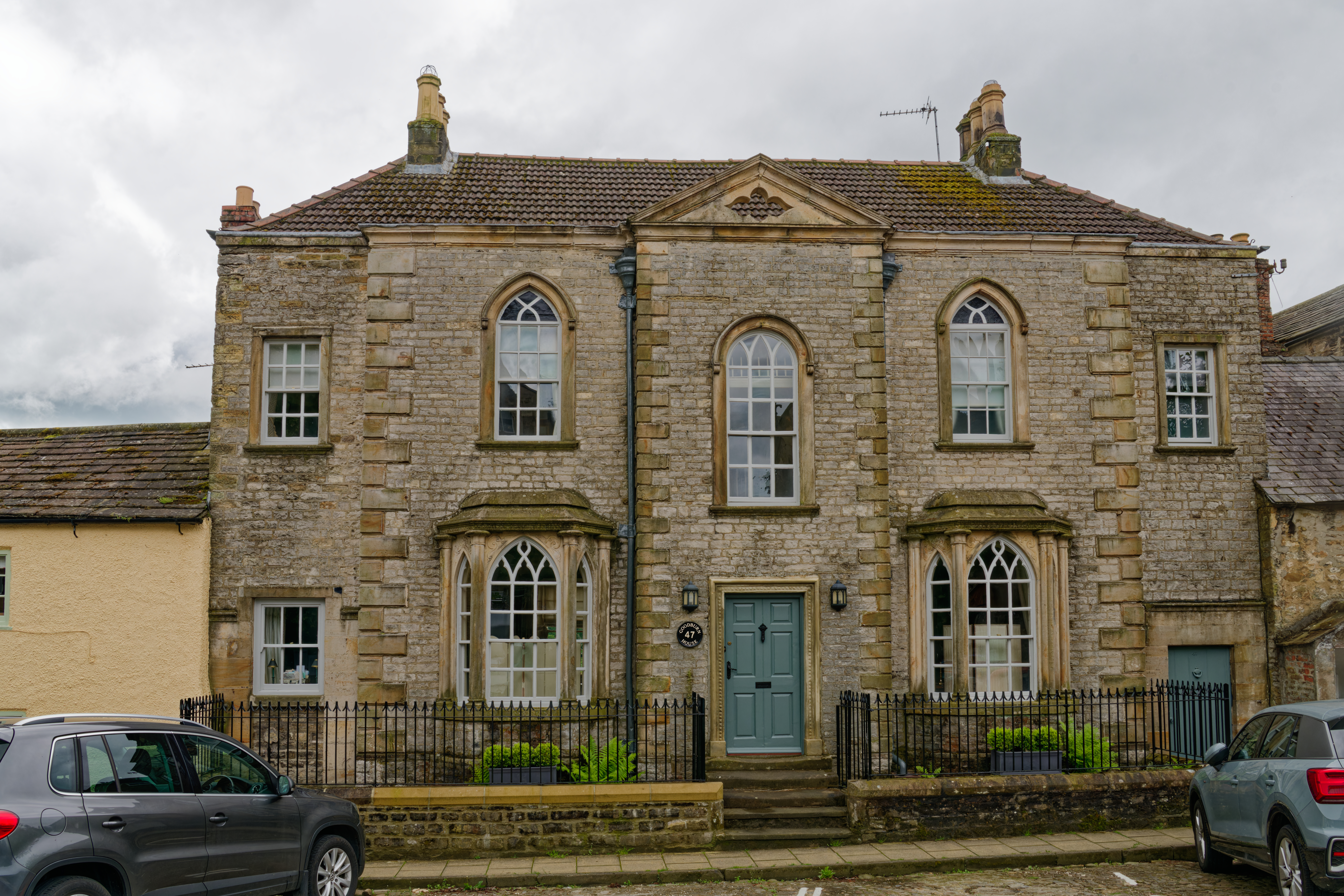
The building, in 2024

Goodburn House, also known as 47 Newbiggin, is a historic building in Richmond, North Yorkshire, a town in England.

The house was constructed in the 18th century, in the Gothick style. Richmondshire District Council note it has "strong architectural themes", but "is brought back to a vernacular interpretation", while Nikolaus Pevsner describes it as "delightful" and notes "it may well be some people's favourite house in Richmond". The building was grade II* listed in 1952.

The house is built of stone, with chamfered quoins, a moulded eaves cornice, and a pantile roof. It has two storeys and five bays, the outer bays slightly recessed, and the central bay projecting under a pediment. The central doorway has a moulded surround with nail head ornament, and above it is a round-headed window with Gothic glazing and a hood mould. Flanking the doorway are canted bay windows with Gothic glazing, clustered column mullions, and shaped roofs, and above them are windows with a pointed head and a hood mould. The windows in the outer bays are flat-headed sashes, and in the right bay is a plain doorway. The bay windows have rib vaulting inside.

== See also ==
- Grade II* listed buildings in North Yorkshire (district)
- Listed buildings in Richmond, North Yorkshire (central area)
