= Westwood Farmhouse =

Historic building in Ebberston, North Yorkshire, England

Coordinates: 54°13′48″N 0°37′22″W

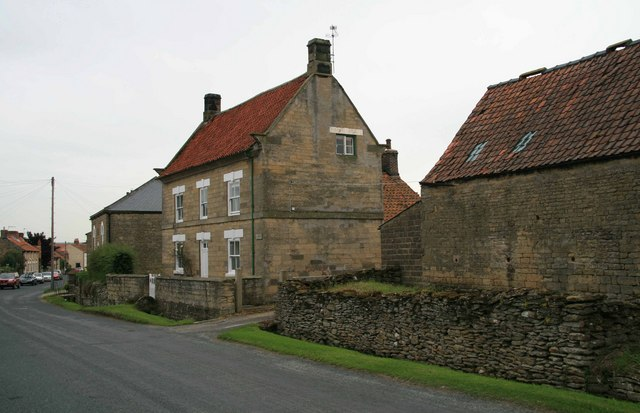
The building, in 2008

Westwood Farmhouse is a historic building in Ebberston, a village in North Yorkshire, in England.

The building was constructed in the mid 18th century. It was grade II* listed in 1986, on account of what Historic England describes as its "remarkable panelled fittings", which are particularly well preserved having never been painted. Although fully panelled rooms are rare in smaller houses of this period, features include a moulded bressumer with a shelf and cupboards on the ground floor, and a firehood on the first floor, and overmantels with cupboards on each floor.

The two-storey farmhouse is built of limestone, with a floor band, a moulded eaves cornice, and a pantile roof with coped gables and shaped kneelers. There are two storeys, three bays and a rear wing. The central doorway has a divided fanlight, the windows are sashes, and all the openings have lintels with tripartite keystones. Inside, original panelled doors with brass fittings survive throughout, including in the attic. The roof truss is a reused cruck pair.

Northwest of the house is a late-18th century, grade II-listed building, comprising a former byre with granary above, a stable, a cartshed and a loose box. The building is in sandstone with quoins and a pantile roof. It has an L-shaped plan, the byre and granary with one storey and a loft, and a single-storey range on the left. The openings include doorways, windows, slit vents and pitching windows. There is an external flight of stone steps.

== See also ==
- Listed buildings in Ebberston and Yedingham
- Grade II* listed buildings in North Yorkshire (district)
