= The Wakeman's House =

Historic building in Ripon, England

Coordinates: 54°08′10″N 1°31′28″W

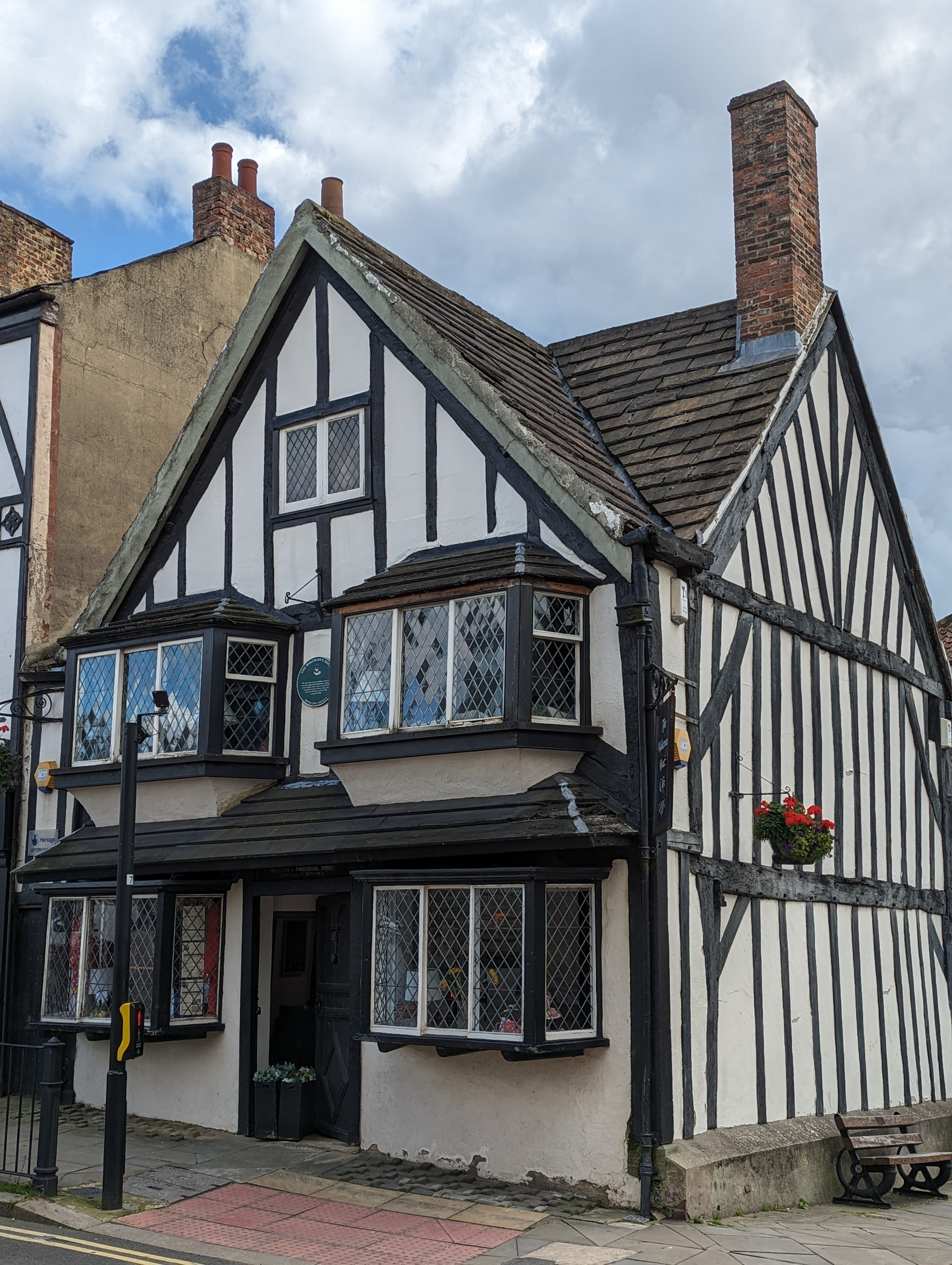
The house, in 2023

The Wakeman's House is a historic building in Ripon, a city in Yorkshire, in England.

The building was constructed as a house in the 16th or early 17th century, facing onto High Skellgate. In about 1600, the entrance was altered to face onto the Market Square, and over time most of the building was demolished, leaving one wing standing. It was traditionally considered to have been the house of Hugh Ripley, the last Wakeman of Ripon, who in 1604 became the city's first mayor. In 1917, the remaining wing was under threat of demolition, but was purchased by the city council and restored, with a kitchen added at the rear. The council opened the building as a museum, and stripped the plaster from the front, to expose the timber frame.

The building was Grade II* listed in 1949. After the museum closed, the building served successively as a tea shop, a tourist information centre, the offices of the Ripon Improvement Trust, a dress shop, and then a tea shop again. In 2000, the kitchen was demolished, and public toilets were constructed on the site.

The building has two main storeys and an attic. It is timber-framed throughout, with a stone slate roof. The front of the building has oriel windows on both floors, while the attic has a window in its gable end. Inside, the staircase has balusters with a pattern of circles and rectangles.

A local tradition claims that the building is haunted by the ghost of Hugh Ripley, even though he never lived in the building. When it reopened in the 1920s after restoration, there was a ceremony at which the city hornblower performed. Several members of the crowd claimed to have seen the ghost at an upstairs window.

== See also ==
- Grade II* listed buildings in North Yorkshire (district)
- Listed buildings in Ripon
