= Former Sandes Soldiers' Home =

Listed building in North Yorkshire, England

- Interactive map of the Former Sandes Soldiers' Home area

General information
- Location: Catterick Garrison, England
- Coordinates: 54.3740°N 1.7184°W
- Ordnance Survey: SE184976
- Named for: Elise Sandes
- Completed: November 1928
- Opened: 23 November 1928

Listed Building – Grade II*
- Designated: 25 July 2024
- Reference no.: 1488335

The Former Sandes Soldiers' Home, is a grade II* listed building within Catterick Garrison, North Yorkshire, England. Historic England stated that the building had been grade II* listed due to its "architectural quality and its historical association with Elise Sandes". The awarding of the grade II* status places it in the top 8% of buildings listed by Historic England.

== History ==
Catterick Garrison (known as Catterick Camp until 1973) was opened during the First World War as a training facility, but in 1923 it was decided to retain the site as a permanent army base, a decision which prompted General Sir Charles Harington ask for the home to be built. The building was opened on 23 November 1928 and provided a place where soldiers could go without the pressure of the military environment. The building was designed by a firm of architects based in Belfast, and, at the insistence of Elise Sandes who ran the Sandes homes, it was constructed using a workforce recruited from largely from Ulster. When the home was opened, it included a canteen, cinema, billiards room, reading room, a library, and accommodation rooms if soldiers wished to take a break from barracks life. Elise Sandes had provided 31 of these homes for soldiers throughout the British Empire, including in India and Ireland, but homes also were built in Iceland and France during the Second World War. Part of the building had been converted into a swimming pool, but use of the pool was discontinued in the 1970s when the pool at Shute Road had a roof fitted, and also the opening of the public swimming pool at Richmond.

The main façade of the building, which is 240 feet (73 m) in length, faces onto one of the public roads running through Catterick Camp. It was listed for sale in January 1976, and ceased to be used for its intended purpose in 1983, being refurbished and reopened as a training establishment in 1986, though the Sandes homes charity continued until final closure in 2023. The building was listed at grade II* with Historic England, which places it in the top 8% of listed buildings in England. Newly listing a building at II* level is a "rare occurrence" according to Historic England, but they said that "..the former Sandes Home thoroughly deserves this higher level of listing in recognition of both its architectural quality, and its association with Elise Sandes."
