= The Cross Keys, Malton =

Pub in Malton, North Yorkshire, England

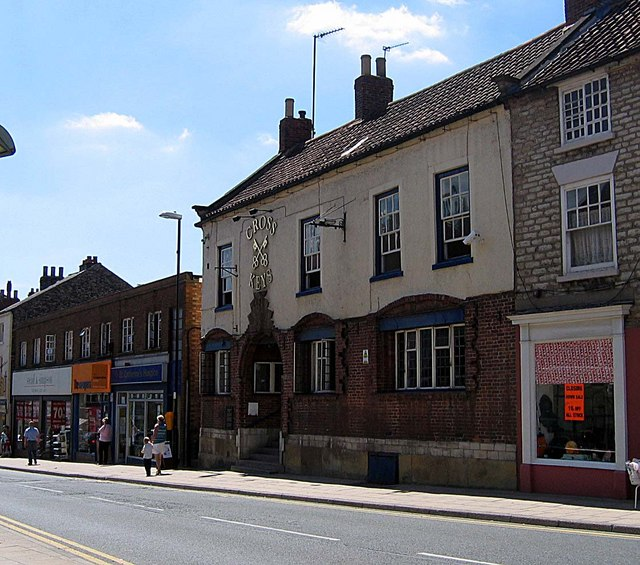
The pub, in 2008

The Cross Keys is a historic pub in Malton, North Yorkshire, a town in England.

St Peter's Hospital was constructed on Wheelgate in Malton in about 1150. It was rebuilt in the 15th century, but was demolished at some point after the Dissolution of the Monasteries. In the late 18th century, the Cross Keys pub was constructed on the site, incorporating the crypt of the hospital as its basement. It was extended in the 19th century, and altered in the early 20th century. The building was grade II* listed in 1951. In the 21st century, it has served variously as a restaurant and as a bar. Since 2023, it has been the fine dining Dinner by Uovo restaurant, with a menu which changes each month.

The ground floor is refaced in red brick with quoins, below is a rendered basement, the upper floor is roughcast and whitewashed, and there is a pantile roof with coped gables and rounded kneelers. There are two storeys and a basement, and four bays. The entrance has a round arch containing a flight of steps leading to an internal doorway. This is flanked by recessed bow windows, and at the right is a five-light window; all contain casements and are under segmental arches. The upper floor contains sash windows. The basement has three bays under rib vaulting, with bosses. There are numerous blocked openings, with some locals believing they are sealed tunnels to various locations in the town.

== See also ==
- Listed buildings in Malton, North Yorkshire (central area)
