= The Crescent, Scarborough =

Houses in Scarborough, North Yorkshire, England

Coordinates: 54.2793°N 0.4026°W

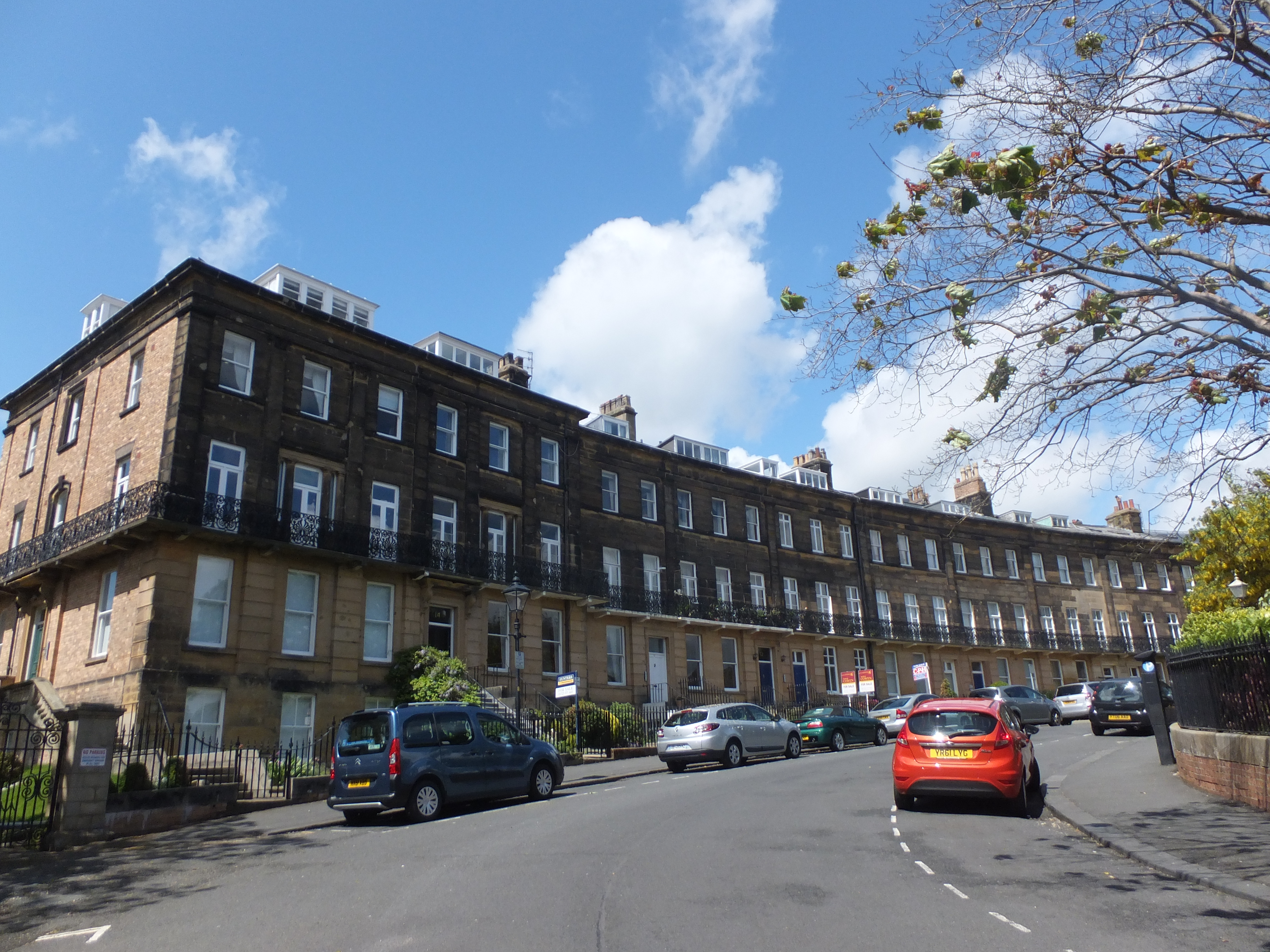
The building, in 2013

The Crescent is a historic terrace of houses in Scarborough, North Yorkshire, a town in England.

The terrace was designed between 1832 and 1833 by R. H. and Samuel Sharp, as part of a development which included Belvoir Terrace and four villas. However, the terrace's fifteen houses were not completed until about 1857. George Sheeran describes them as bringing "a new standard to the area in the design of terraced houses", and displaying "a cool conformity in their frontages". There is a communal garden area in front of the terrace. The terrace was grade II* listed in 1953.

The terraces are built of stone, the ground floor with horizontal rustication, and have a hipped slate roof. Most of the houses have three bays, and the six bays at each end project slightly. Steps with iron railings lead up to the doorways, which have architraves and oblong fanlights. Above the ground floor is a stone balcony with decorative cast iron railings, between the houses on the upper two floors are pilasters, the middle floor contains French windows, the other windows are sashes, and on the roofs are dormers.

== See also ==
- Grade II* listed buildings in North Yorkshire (district)
- Listed buildings in Scarborough (Castle Ward)
