= 32 Queen Street =

Building in Scarborough, North Yorkshire, England

Coordinates: 54°17′05″N 0°23′57″W

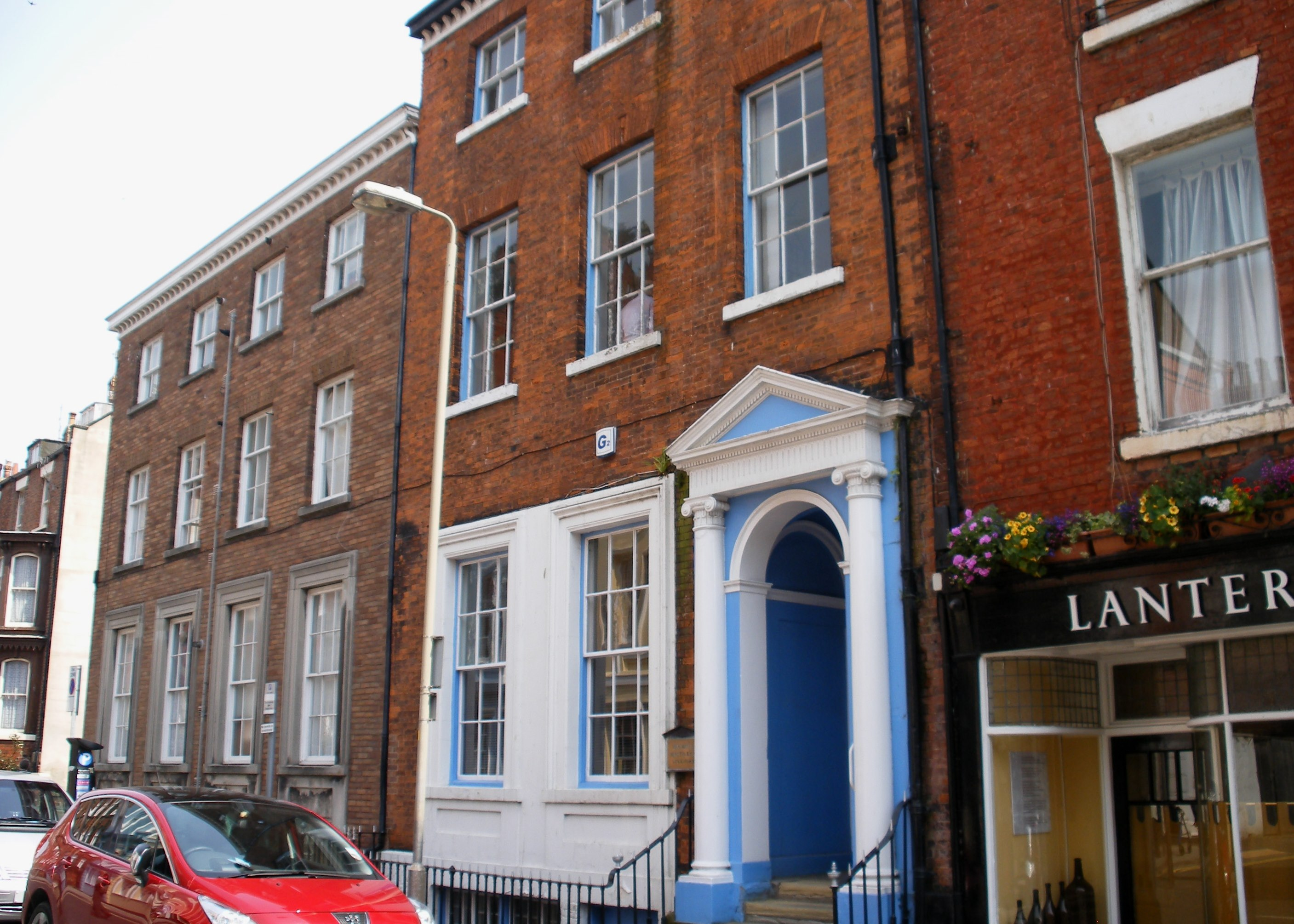
The building, in 2023

32 Queen Street is a historic building in Scarborough, North Yorkshire, a town in England.

The house was constructed shortly before 1800, on Queen Street in the centre of Scarborough. Iron railings were added to the front in the 19th century. The building was grade II* listed in 1953. Historic England notes that it forms part of a group with 6, 7 and 8 to 13 Queen Street.

The house is built of red brick with a bracketed moulded cornice and a slate roof. There are three storeys and a basement, and three bays. Steps lead up to the entrance in the right bay, with Ionic engaged columns, an entablature with a reeded-fluted frieze, a moulded dentilled cornice, and a triangular pediment. The doorway has panelled reveals, and a semicircular fanlight, and is deeply recessed in a lobby, that has intersecting barrel vaulted ceiling, and an arched opening to the front with a moulded architrave and imposts. The windows are sashes, those on the ground floor with architraves, panelled aprons, and flat gauged brick arches. The basement contains a doorway and a horizontally sliding sash window. The steps and basement area have wrought iron railings with turned baluster standards, and small urn finials.

Inside, the house retains many original features, including plasterwork in the ground floor front room, Adam-style fireplaces throughout, mahogany doors, and an open string staircase.

== See also ==
- Grade II* listed buildings in North Yorkshire (district)
- Listed buildings in Scarborough (Castle Ward)
