= St Thomas' Church, Scarborough =

Building in Scarborough, North Yorkshire, England

Coordinates: 54°17′04″N 0°23′29″W

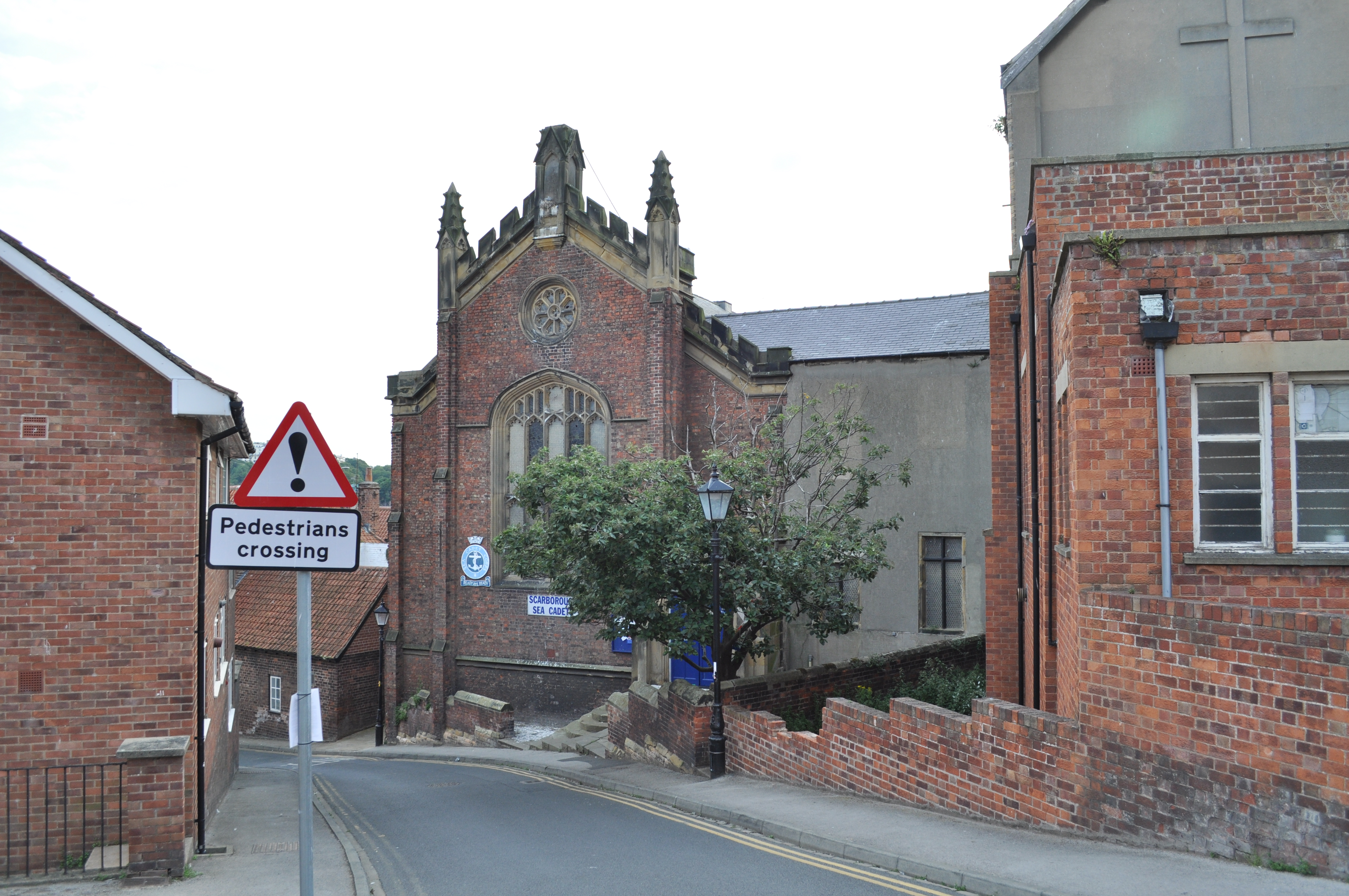
The building, in 2010

St Thomas' Church is a deconsecrated Anglican church in Scarborough, North Yorkshire, a town in England.

There was a mediaeval chapel of St Thomas on Newborough in Scarborough, but it was demolished during a siege in the English Civil War. The current church was built in 1840, on East Sandgate. It was designed by Thomas Davidson, in the neo-Gothic style. A north aisle was added to the church in 1857. The church closed in the mid 20th century, and was converted into a museum of local history. It later became the headquarters of the local sea cadets. In 2022, the group raised funds to repair a bowed wall and redecorate the building. The building has been grade II listed since 1973.

The building is constructed of red brick with stone dressings and a slate roof, and has embattled parapets. There are panelled buttresses at the east and west ends, and at the east end is a stuccoed porch with an embattled parapet. Due to the sloping site, at the south end, the crypt is at ground level. The east window has stained glass by Charles Eamer Kempe.

== See also ==
- Listed buildings in Scarborough (Castle Ward)
