= Scarborough Town Wall =

Walls in Scarborough, North Yorkshire, England

Coordinates: 54°17′07″N 0°24′02″W

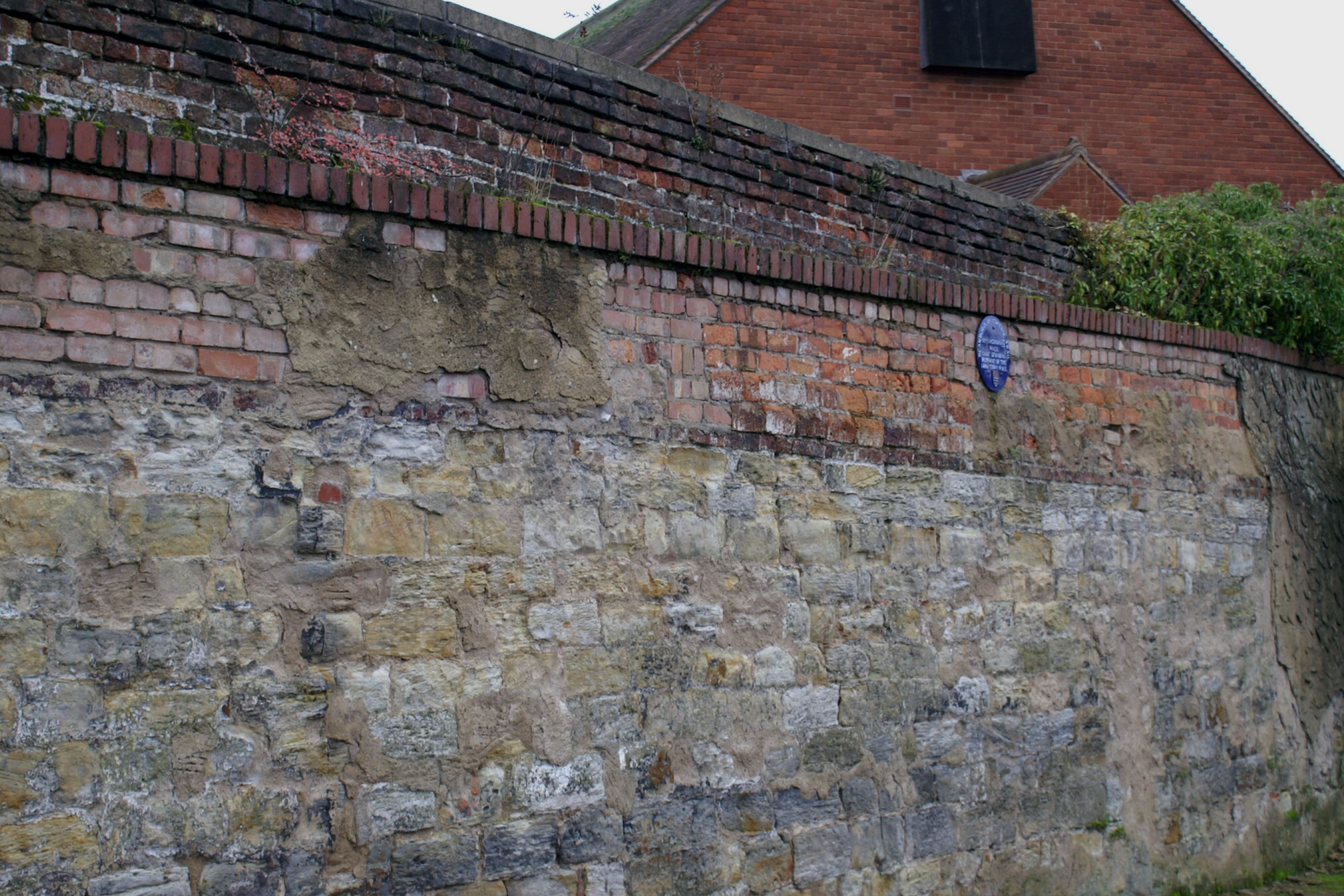
Surviving section of the wall

The Scarborough Town Wall was a fortification surrounding Scarborough, North Yorkshire, a town in England.

The borough of Scarborough was founded in the 12th century. A wall was built on the landward side of the town, from the a ditch at junction of Auborough and Cross Street, to the sea. It was then continued along what is now Eastborough, either as a wall or a wooden palisade. This ran partly along the line of the cliff and terminated at the castle. A ditch was dug outside the wall.

The defences were first recorded in 1225, when the town was granted forty oak trees and three years of tolls on shipping to maintain them. In 1283/4, the monks of Blackfriars applied to demolish the wall, but this was opposed by the town burgesses, and the wall was instead maintain into the 14th century. Houses were then built up against the wall, and it was gradually removed to provide stone for new construction elsewhere.

Perhaps in the late 15th century, a wall was constructed further west, and this was maintained into the 16th century, with substantial foundations still visible at the end of the 18th century. The gate on Auborough, which John Leland described as "very base", was demolished at an early date, but the gate on Newborough which Leland called "meatley good", survived until 1843. That year, it was demolished and replaced by a new gate in a neo-Gothic style, but this was demolished in 1890.

Two small, curved, sections of wall survive off St Thomas Street. They date from the 15th century, were added to in the 17th century, and repaired in the 19th century. They are built of stone surmounted by brick, and are rendered. Both sections have buttresses and they are jointly grade II listed. The ditch is not visible, but excavations near St Mary's Parish House showed it to be 9 metres wide and up to 4.4 metres deep.

== See also ==
- Listed buildings in Scarborough (Castle Ward)
