= Wilson's Mariners' Homes =

Building in Scarborough, North Yorkshire, England

Coordinates: 54°17′11″N 0°23′54″W

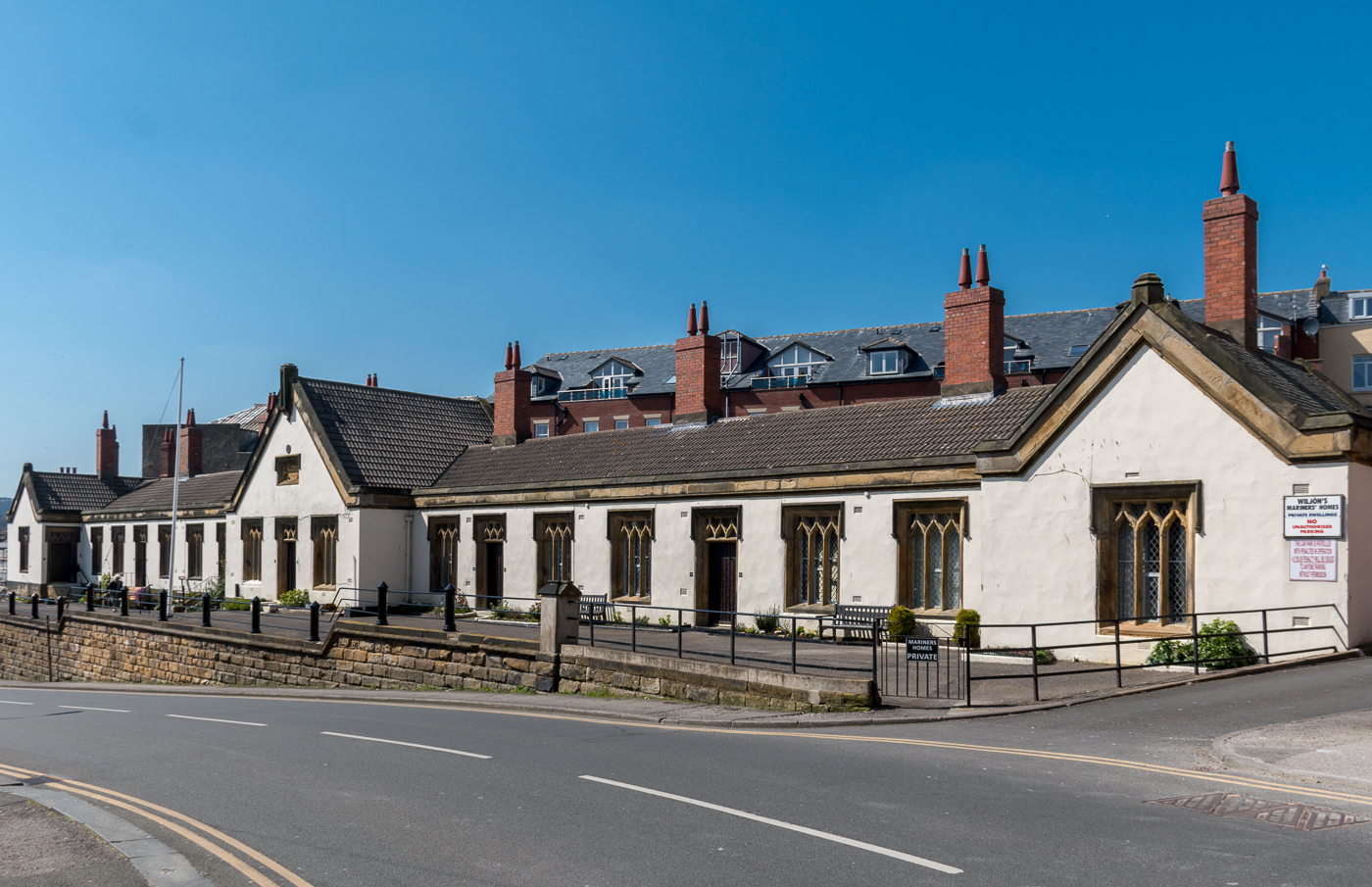
The building, in 2016

Wilson's Mariners' Homes is a historic building in Scarborough, North Yorkshire, a town in England.

The building was constructed in 1836, as the Mariners' Asylum. They are named for Richard Wilson, who provided their endowment, and were designed by John Barry in the neo-Gothic style. They initially comprised 14 almshouses, but were extended to the west in 1922. The building was grade II listed in 1953.

The range of houses is built of rendered brick on a stone base, with a stone cornice, a coped parapet and a slate roof. It has a single storey and 12 bays, the middle three and the end bays projecting slightly with coped gables. The windows have flat heads and three lights, each with an ogee cusped head, and hood moulds. The doorways have fanlights with similar heads. The 1922 extension is in red brick and has two storeys.

== See also ==
- Listed buildings in Scarborough (Castle Ward)
