= 2 Quay Street =

Historic building in Scarborough, England

Coordinates: 54°17′04″N 0°23′27″W

2 Quay Street is a historic building in Scarborough, North Yorkshire, a town in England.

Quay Street was probably laid out in the 13th century, to provide access to the town's new harbour. 2 Quay Street was probably constructed in the late 15th century, where the road meets Whitehead Hill. In the 18th century, sash windows were installed. The building was originally three storeys high, but in the 20th century, the top floor was removed. The building was restored in 1965, at which time the windows were replaced, and the external plasterwork was removed to reveal timber framing. The building has been grade II* listed since 1953.

The house is timber framed with roughcast infill, probably sitting on a stone base, and has a pantile roof. It has two storeys and an attic. The gable end faces the street, and the attic is jettied on curved brackets. On the ground floor is a doorway and to the right is a bow window with a frieze and a cornice. Above it are two modern windows, and on the attic and left return are casement windows.

== See also ==
- Grade II* listed buildings in North Yorkshire (district)
- Listed buildings in Scarborough (Castle Ward)
