= 23 and 24 King Street =

Building in Scarborough, North Yorkshire, England

Coordinates: 54°16′58″N 0°23′52″W

23 and 24 King Street is a historic building in Scarborough, North Yorkshire, a town in England.

King Street has been a commercial area for many centuries, housing an apple market until 1880. 23 and 24 King Street was built in the mid 18th century as a large house. It was altered in about 1800, when a large bay window was added. Later in the century it became the York Hotel, operating until late in the 20th century, when it was converted into two houses. The building was grade II* listed in 1953.

The building is constructed of red brick on a stone plinth, with stone dressings, quoins, a moulded string course, a frieze, and a moulded cornice. It has three storeys and a basement, and two bays. The right bay contains a two-storey segmental bow window, and to its left is a doorway with an eared architrave, pilaster strips, a large decorated fanlight, and a cornice hood on carved scroll brackets. The other windows are sashes with keystones. At the rear is a two-storey roughcast wing with a public house front, including pilasters and a cornice. Inside, both houses have early panelling, and 23 King Street has an early staircase and corner fireplaces.

== See also ==
- Grade II* listed buildings in North Yorkshire (district)
- Listed buildings in Scarborough (Castle Ward)
