= Trinity House, Scarborough =

Building in Scarborough, North Yorkshire, England

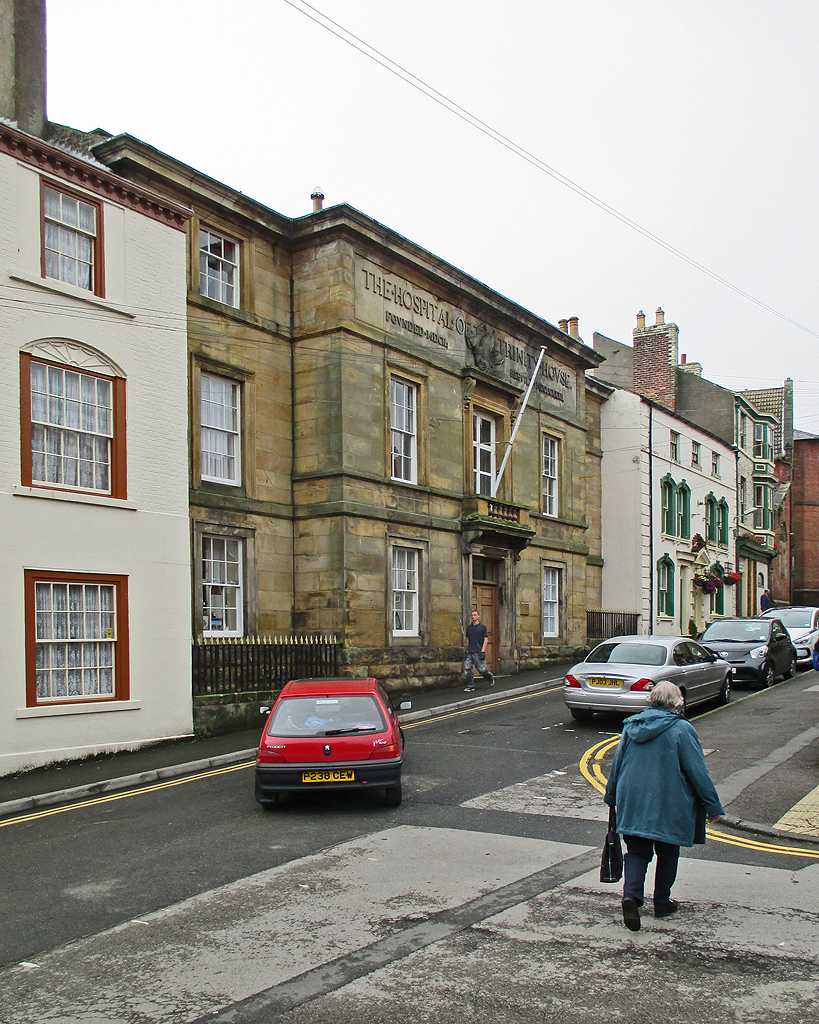
The building, in 2023

Trinity House is a historic building in Scarborough, North Yorkshire, a town in England.

In 1602, the Society of Ship Owners and Master Mariners built almshouses on St Sepulchre Street in Scarborough. John Lawson died in 1665, and left money in his will for the construction of a replacement building, which became the first Trinity House. It provided rooms for 27 elderly or injured sailors or their widows, and two rooms for meetings of the society, in which they transacted the business of the port. In 1832, the building was completely rebuilt, to a design by R. H. Sharp. It was later altered internally, to provide seven self-contained flats. There is an annexe with 18 further flats on Tollergate, which was rebuilt in 1959.

The building is constructed of stone on a plinth, with sill courses, and a moulded projecting eaves cornice. It has three storeys and is five bays wide, the middle three bays projecting. The central doorway has panelled strips and a cornice on brackets, and an oblong fanlight. The window above has a similar surround and a balustraded balcony. The windows are sashes in architraves. At the top is a full width panel with lettering, dates and a motif. In front of the outer bays are cast iron spear head railings. Inside, there is a boardroom on the first floor, which retains its original plasterwork. The building has been grade II* listed since 1973.

== See also ==
- Grade II* listed buildings in North Yorkshire (district)
- Listed buildings in Scarborough (Castle Ward)
