= Scarborough Market Hall =

Market hall in Scarborough, North Yorkshire, England

Coordinates: 54.2838°N 0.3965°W

The building, in 2026

Scarborough Market Hall is a historic building in Scarborough, North Yorkshire, in England.

Markets were held in various locations in Scarborough, but by the early 19th century, the main location was Newborough, which was considered inconvenient. In 1853, a private company built a market hall on St Helen's Square, and this gradually replaced the other markets, the last street market being that of the corn merchants on King Street, running until the 1950s. The building was designed by J. Irvine in the neoclassical style, though the Victoria County History describes it as being of "no architectural distinction". The building was grade II listed in 1973. In 2017, the market was restored and a mezzanine was added, at a total cost of £2 million.

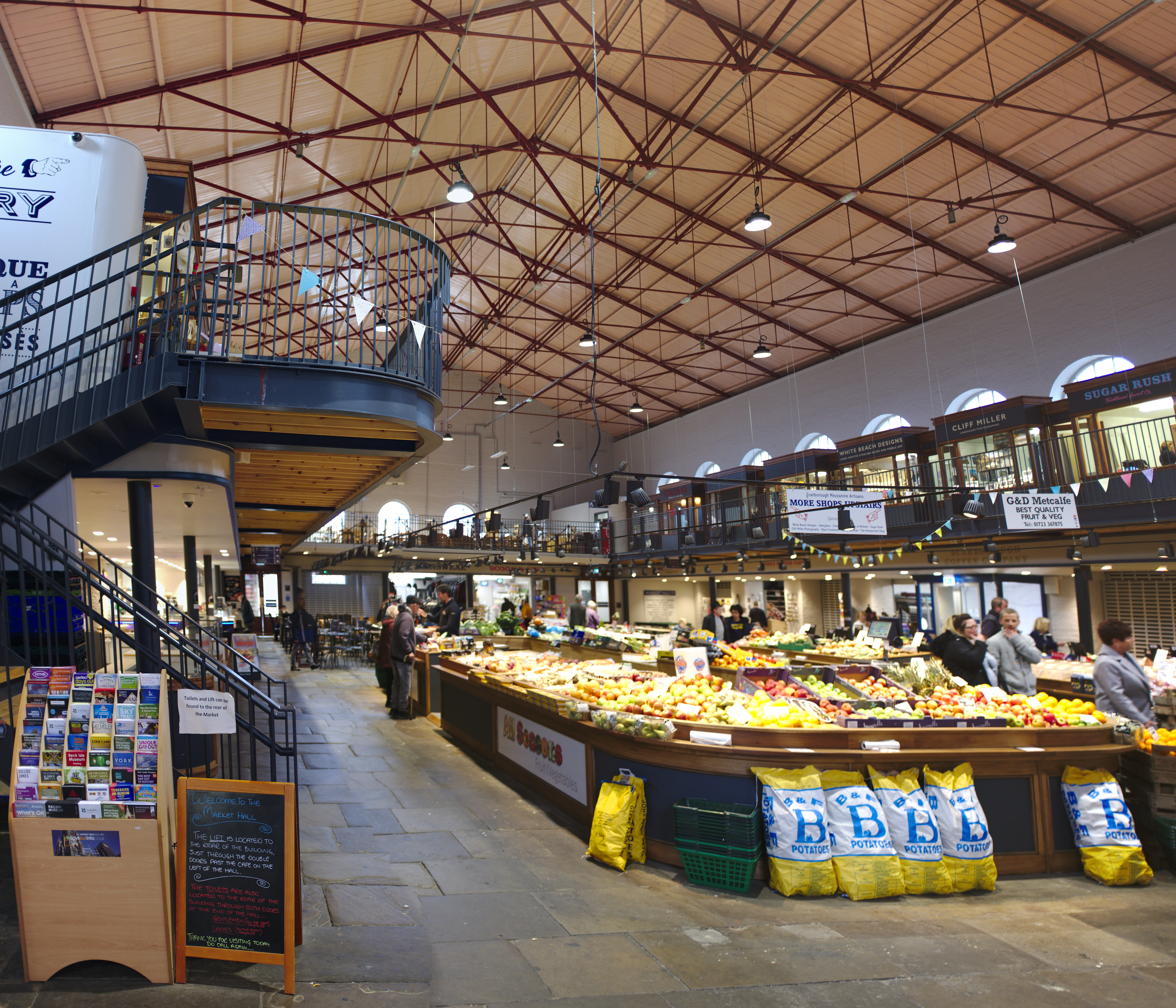
Interior of the hall

The market hall is built of stone, with a rusticated basement. There are seven bays, the outer bays flanked by rusticated pilasters. The other bays contain round-headed arches with three-quarter Doric columns, the outer ones with doorways and the others with windows. Above is a large cornice, and a pediment containing a semicircular window. The outer bays contain circular motifs. Flanking the hall are lower wings containing round-headed blind arches. Inside are a variety of fixed and temporary stalls, selling a wide variety of goods and also hosting four cafes. Under the main hall is a vaulted basement with additional stalls.

== See also ==
- Listed buildings in Scarborough (Castle Ward)
