= Listed buildings in Scarborough (Castle Ward) =

Castle Ward is a ward in the town of Scarborough, North Yorkshire, England. It contains about 220 listed buildings that are recorded in the National Heritage List for England. Of these, three are listed at Grade I, the highest of the three grades, 19 are at Grade II*, the middle grade, and the others are at Grade II, the lowest grade. The ward is in the oldest part of the town, towards its northeast, it is mainly commercial and residential, and it contains the harbour and the major hotels for its tourist industry. In the ward are by far the largest number of listed buildings in the town, most of which are houses, cottages and associated structures, shops and offices. The others include churches, hotels and public houses, civic buildings, including the town hall, museums, an art gallery and a library, a butter cross, parts of the town wall, piers in the harbour and its lighthouse, bridges, railway stations and a signal box, a former music hall, a school, a police telephone box and a pair of telephone kiosks, a theatre and a statue.

== Key ==
Grade	Criteria
I	Buildings of exceptional interest, sometimes considered to be internationally important
II*	Particularly important buildings of more than special interest
II	Buildings of national importance and special interest

== Buildings ==
Name and location	Photograph	Date	Notes	Grade
St Mary's Church; 54.28657°N 0.39373°W		12th century	Much of the church was destroyed in the Civil War, it was partly rebuilt in the late 17th century, and restored in 1848–52 by Ewan Christian. The church is built in stone and consists of a nave, north and south aisles, a south porch, a series of south chapels, a south transept, and a tower at the east end. The tower has a south clock face, two-light bell openings and an embattled parapet.	I
Butter Cross; 54.28452°N 0.39299°W		Medieval	The structure is in stone, and consists of a base and a shaft, with carved crocket-type leaves running up the angles.	I
King Richard's House; 54.28421°N 0.39043°W		Medieval	The house, which ha been altered and restored, is in stone, with brickwork in the gable head, and a pantile roof. There are three storeys and an attic, and one bay. On the attic is a three-light mullioned window with a hood mould. Below is a three-storey square bay window, with a doorway on the ground floor, and mullioned and transomed windows on the upper floors. To the right is a lower stuccoed extension with two storeys and an attic, and one bay. On the ground floor is a shop window and a doorway with a divided fanlight to the left, and a multi-pane window above.	I
Steps and walls, St Mary's Church; 54.28619°N 0.39346°W		15th century (probable)	The steps that continue St Mary's Street to the south of the church divide at the top, and run along the retaining stone wall to the churchyard. At the head of the steps is a gateway with brick piers and wrought iron gates dating from the 18th century.	II
Town wall 54.28526°N 0.40070°W		15th century	Two curved sections of the town walls survive, they are in stone surmounted by brick, and are rendered. Both sections have buttresses.	II
2 Quay Street; 54.28440°N 0.39087°W	—	15th to 16th century	The house is timber framed with roughcast infill and a pantile roof. There are two storeys and an attic. The gable end faces the street, and the attic is jettied on curved brackets. On the ground floor is a doorway and to the right is a bow window with a frieze and a cornice. Above it are two modern windows, and on the attic and left return are casement windows.	II*
45 Quay Street; 54.28437°N 0.38850°W		15th to 16th century	A house, at one time an inn, on a corner site, it is timber framed, with brick and some plaster infill and a tile roof. There are two storeys, the upper storey on the west front jettied, with a moulded bressumer and a corner bracket. On the ground floor is a doorway and a canted bay window, and the windows elsewhere are casements.	II*
9 Leading Post Street; 54.28333°N 0.39575°W		16th century	A house, at one time a shop, the ground floor is in rendered brick, above it is timber framed, and has a pantile roof. There are three storeys and one bay. The ground floor contains a shop bow window with a timber pediment, and to the right is a doorway. On the middle floor are two horizontally sliding sash windows, and the top floor has close studding.	II
The Three Mariners; 54.28434°N 0.38828°W		16th century (probable)	The former public house has a timber framed core, and it was enclosed in red brick in the late 17th century, leaving the west front exposed with brick infill. There are two storeys and four bays, a plinth, a moulded brick eaves cornice, and a pantile roof. The doorway in the left bay has an architrave, a false oblong fanlight, a frieze with fluting and roundels, and a cornice and pediment on small brackets. Above the ground floor are four pediments in moulded brick on a string course in moulded brick, and in the right bay is a carved brick roundel ornament on both floors. The windows on the ground flor are sashes, and the upper floor contains a small window in the left bay, and two mullioned and transomed casement windows in the middle bays.	II*
East Pier, Old Pier, Vincent's Pier and West Pier; 54.28317°N 0.38819°W		1565–85	The piers enclose the harbour, and are built mainly from large stone blocks. The oldest is Old Pier, and the next is Vincent's Pier, added in about 1792. The East Pier, built between 1752 and 1826, gave protection to the Old Pier, and the West Pier, which was built in 1817–22 was enlarged in 1877–80.	II
1, 2 and 3 East Sandgate; 54.28435°N 0.39121°W	—	16th to 17th century	Cottages and a shop with a timber framed core, later encased in stone and stuccoed. There are two storeys and four bays, and a rear wing. On the left three bays are horizontal sliding sash windows, the right bay has a shopfront with Doric pilasters, a passage entry to the right, and above is a sash window.	II
11 and 12 Sandside; 54.28426°N 0.39164°W		Late 17th or early 18th century	The building has been much altered and used for other purposes. It is stuccoed on the front, in brick with traces of timber framing at the rear, and has a pantile roof. There are two storeys and an attic, and two bays, the right bay gabled. The ground floor has a modern front, on the upper floor are modern windows, and the attic contains a sash window.	II
The Leeds Arms Public House; 54.28482°N 0.39296°W		17th to 18th century	The public house has a rendered ground floor, a pebbledashed upper floor, a gutter cornice and a pantile roof. There are two storeys and an attic, and two bays. The central doorway has a plain surround, there is a smaller doorway on the extreme right, the windows are sashes, and there is a dormer.	II
43 and 45 Princess Street; 54.28510°N 0.39065°W	—	1712	A pair of red brick houses on a stone plinth, with a pantile roof. There are two storeys and two bays. The doorways are paired in the centre and have Doric pilasters and an entablature. Above the doorways is an initialled datestone, and the windows are sashes, those in the left house paired.	II
9 Sandside; 54.28425°N 0.39190°W	—	Early 18th century	A customs house, later used for other purposes, in brick with stone dressings, chamfered quoins, floor bands, a gabled parapet with moulded stone coping, and a slate roof. There are three storeys and an attic, and two bays. The ground floor contains a modern shopfront, on the middle floor is a square bay window, and above are sash windows, the attic window with a round head. At the rear is a bracketed cornice.	II
21 and 23 St Sepulchre Street; 54.28412°N 0.39498°W	—	Early 18th century	A house later divided into two, it is stuccoed, and has rusticated flanking strips, a sill band, a shallow eaves band, and a slate roof. There are three storeys and three bays. In the centre, the original doorway has a Gibbs surround and a pediment, and to its left is a doorway with a plain surround and an oblong fanlight. The windows are sashes, and on the top floor they are recessed. Elsewhere, they have cambered heads, eared architraves and keystones, these on the middle floor in pairs.	II
Wesley House; 54.28519°N 0.39032°W		Early 18th century	The house is in chequer brick on a plinth, with string courses, a parapet with a wooden triglyph frieze, a moulded cornice gutter, and a pantile roof. There are two storeys and an attic, and four bays. Steps lead up to the doorway that has an eared architrave, an oblong fanlight, a plain frieze, and a moulded and dentilled cornice. The windows are sashes in architraves, and there is a wide dormer.	II
3 Palace Hill Terrace; 54.28389°N 0.39439°W		1732	The house is in rendered brick, with string courses, a parapet with moulded coping, and a pantile roof. There are three storeys and an attic, and three bays. The doorway on the right has an oblong fanlight, and the windows are sashes in architraves.	II
32 and 33 Sandside; 54.28405°N 0.38952°W		Early to mid-18th century	A pair of brick houses on a plinth with stone capping, string courses, a moulded and coved eaves cornice, and a hipped pantile roof. There are three storeys, basements and attics, and a front of four bays. On the front are two doorways, each with pilasters, an oblong fanlight and an entablature, and to the right is a small basement doorway. The windows, in architraves, are a mix of sashes and pivot casements, there are cellar windows, and three dormers.	II
14A, 14B and 17 St Nicholas Street; 54.28216°N 0.39857°W	—	Early to mid-18th century	A pair of merchants' houses converted into shops and flats, in red brick, with flanking fluted stone Ionic pilasters, with carved capitals, an entablature, and a parapet with a moulded string course. There are four storeys and five bays. In the centre is an arched doorway with fluted Ionic pilasters, an entablature, a curved frieze, a pediment and a mask keystone. Inside, steps lead to a recessed door with an arched fanlight, and the entrance is flanked by modern shopfronts. The windows are sashes with segmental heads and fluted keystones, those in the middle bay with architraves.	II*
3 and 5 Tuthill; 54.28456°N 0.39205°W	—	Early to mid-18th century	A pair of houses that were later refronted, in red brick with a pantile roof. There are two storeys and two bays, and a rear wing with shaped brackets to the eaves. The windows on the front are horizontally sliding sashes flanked by doorways.	II
9 Tuthill; 54.28457°N 0.39195°W	—	Early to mid-18th century	The house is rendered and has chamfered stone quoins, a pantile roof, and two storeys. On the ground floor is a doorway to the right with an oblong fanlight, and a smaller door to the left. Between them, and on the upper floor, are sash windows, to the left of the upper floor window is a small casement window, and above is a dormer. Inside, there is a massive oak chimney piece.	II*
11 and 13 Tuthill; 54.28459°N 0.39185°W	—	Early to mid-18th century	A pair of red brick houses, the left house rendered, with a pantile roof. There are two storeys and two bays. The windows are recessed sashes in moulded frames, and outside them are steps leading up to doorways with oblong fanlights.	II
35 Castlegate; 54.28584°N 0.39048°W		18th century	The house is in brick with string courses, a large moulded bracketed cornice, and a pantile roof. There are three storeys, a basement and an attic, and three bays. Steps lead up to the doorway that has pilasters, an oblong fanlight, an entablature and a bracketed cornice. The windows are sashes, those on the right bay paired, and those on the lower two floors with keystones, and there is a dormer.	II
37 and 39 Eastborough; 54.28350°N 0.39474°W		18th century	A pair of houses in red brick on a stone plinth, with floor bands, a bracketed cornice and a slate roof. There are three storeys and six bays. In the centre is an Ionic porch with five pilasters and two columns, decorative and bracketed entablatures with a curved frieze, and a deep open pediment with enriched octagonal panels to the soffit. The tympanum over the doors contains vase and cornucopia ornament. The windows are sashes, those on the lower two floors with wedge lintels and keystones. In front are plain cast iron railings.	II*
21 King Street; 54.28258°N 0.39773°W	—	18th century	The house, at one time an inn, was refronted in the 19th century. It is stuccoed, the ground floor is rusticated, and above is a projecting eaves cornice and a slate roof. There are two storeys and an attic, and two bays. The ground floor has a former pub front with a central doorway with a rectangular fanlight, Doric pilasters, panelled risers, and a string course. On the upper floor are paired sash windows in architraves, and the attic contains three dormers, the middle one with three lights and pedimented.	II
23 and 24 King Street; 54.28272°N 0.39782°W	—	Mid-18th century	A hotel, later two houses, in red brick on a stone plinth, with stone dressings, quoins, a moulded string course, a frieze, and a moulded cornice. There are three storeys and a basement, and two bays. The right bay contains a two-storey segmental bow window, and to its left is a doorway with an eared architrave, pilaster strips, a large decorated fanlight, and a cornice hood on carved scroll brackets. The other windows are sashes with keystones. At the rear is a two-storey roughcast wing with a public house front, including pilasters and a cornice.	II*
4 and 4A Newborough; 54.28243°N 0.39999°W	—	Mid-18th century	The shop is in red brick, with chamfered painted quoins, a frieze, a moulded cornice, and a coped parapet. There are three storeys and an attic, and three bays. The ground floor contains a modern shopfront and a passage entry to the right. On the middle floor are three shallow bow windows in fluted pilaster frames with a common frieze and a moulded cornice. The middle window on the top floor is blind, it is flanked by sash windows, and all have keystones, and the attic has a two-light dormer.	II
41–43 Newborough; 54.28318°N 0.39712°W	—	18th century	Two houses, later shops, that were refronted in the 19th century. They are stuccoed, and each has a moulded eaves cornice, and on the ground floor is an altered late Victorian shopfront. The right shop has three storeys and three bays, and a sill band, and the upper floors contain sash windows in architraves, those on the middle floor with cornices, and over the central window is a scrolled leaf pediment. The left shop is the same height, with four storeys and two bays, and the windows are sashes.	II
2 Palace Hill Terrace; 54.28385°N 0.39446°W	—	18th century	The house is in red brick, and has a parapet with moulded coping and a pantile roof. There are three storeys and one bay. The doorway on the right has a frieze and a cornice, and the windows are sashes in flush architraves.	II
5 Palace Hill Terrace; 54.28393°N 0.39424°W		Mid-18th century	The house is in painted brick, with string courses, and a parapet with rendered moulded coping. There are three storeys and an attic, and three bays. The doorway on the left has an oblong fanlight, and the windows are sashes in flush architraves.	II
17 and 19 Princess Street; 54.28484°N 0.39209°W	—	Mid-18th century	A pair of cottages in red brick on a plinth, with a moulded eaves band, and a pantile roof. There are two storeys and two bays. The windows are sashes, the doorways flank the ground floor windows, and all the openings have painted gauged brick flat arches. To the left is a passage entry.	II
4 Quay Street; 54.28441°N 0.39076°W	—	18th century	The house is stuccoed and has a pantile roof. There are two storeys and an attic, and two bays. On the front is a doorway, sash windows and there are two dormers.	II
35 Quay Street; 54.28440°N 0.38904°W		18th century	The house, on a corner site, is in stuccoed brick on a plinth, with a corbelled string course. There are two storeys and an attic, one bay on the front, and two on the right return. The doorway has a cornice hood on scroll brackets. On the right return is a canted oriel window, and the other windows are casements.	II
41 Queen Street; 54.28391°N 0.39853°W		Mid-18th century	The shop is in rendered red brick, with chamfered quoins, floor bands, and an elaborate entablature, a frieze on fluted scroll brackets, and a dentilled moulded cornice. There are three storeys and three bays. The ground floor contains a projecting modern shopfront. On the left bay on the middle floor is a canted bay window, and the other windows are sashes with flat arches and keystones.	II
1 Tollergate; 54.28524°N 0.39689°W		18th century	A house on a corner site, in brick on a plinth and a string course above, with a ground floor sill band, a moulded cornice and a slate roof. There are two storeys, a basement and an attic, and three bays. The central doorway has a radiating fanlight, engaged modified Corinthian columns on moulded plinths, a broken entablature, an urn ornament on the frieze and an open pediment. The window above the doorway is blocked, and the others are sashes, all with wedge lintels.	II
4 and 6 Tuthill; 54.28467°N 0.39191°W		18th century	A house, later divided into two, in rendered brick, with shallow flat eaves on small, paired brackets, and a pantile roof. There are two storeys and a basement, and two bays, and two rear wings. The doorways are paired in the centre, with pilaster strips, oblong fanlights, and a shared moulded cornice on console brackets, and the windows are sashes with flat stucco arches.	II
8 Tuthill; 54.28469°N 0.39179°W	—	Mid-18th century	A roughcast house that has been much altered, with a floor band, and the gable end facing the street. There are two storeys, a basement and an attic, and two bays. The gable end contains sash windows in architraves, the attic window with a round head, and a small basement door. On the right is a flight of steps lading up to the entrance, consisting of a doorway with panelled piers, block imposts and a keystone, a cornice and a moulded pediment with initials and a date in the tympanum.	II
Former George Hotel; 54.28292°N 0.39830°W	—	18th century	A coaching inn, later a hotel, and subsequently used for other purposes, the building is stuccoed, with string courses, a sill band, bracketed eaves, and a slate roof. There are five storeys and five bays, and a three-storey rear wing. The ground floor contains modern shopfronts, and the upper floors have sash windows, those on the first floor in architraves, and the middle window tripartite. At the rear is a doorway with pilasters.	II
Wall west and south of Paradise House; 54.28621°N 0.39263°W	—	18th century	The garden and retaining wall is in stone with coping, and has buttresses in some parts. It extends along Paradise and Church Stairs.	II
The Bell Hotel and 8 Prospect Place; 54.28296°N 0.39677°W	—	18th century	The building is in brick. The south front has three storeys and four bays, a doorway with an oblong fanlight, a large segmental bow window, and cast iron balconies. To the right is a stuccoed extension with three storeys and attics, with string courses and vermiculated quoins. The east front has five bays, a Greek Doric porch with an entablature and a triglyph frieze, two two-storey canted bay windows to the right, and a three-storey canted bay window to the left.	II
Turk's Head Public House; 54.28333°N 0.39632°W		18th century	The public house is stuccoed and has a slate roof. There are three bays, the right two bays with three storeys and an attic, and the left bay lower with three storeys. The ground floor contains doorways and a window with pilasters, and a larger two-light bay window with a frieze and a cornice. Over this window is a canted bay window, the other windows are sashes, most with architraves, and there is a gabled dormer.	II
Cliff End House; 54.27997°N 0.39886°W	—	c. 1760–70	The house is in painted brick with a dentilled cornice and a slate roof. The south front has four storeys and an attic, the east, entrance, front is gabled and has three storeys and an attic, and both fronts have three bays. The doorway in the right bay has panelled pilasters, a semicircular fanlight with an Ionic motif, fluted scroll brackets, a broken entablature and an open pediment. The windows are sashes, some tripartite, with flat stucco arches, the attic window on the entrance front has a round-arched head, and there are three dormers.	II*
23 East Sandgate; 54.28481°N 0.39056°W	—	Mid to late 18th century	The house is in painted brick, and has a pantile roof with gable copings and kneelers. There are two storeys and three bays. In the centre is a doorway with panelled strips, a semicircular radial fanlight, and a moulded open pediment on thin fluted console brackets, and to its left is a garage. Above the doorway is a modern window, and the other windows are tripartite sashes.	II
121 Longwestgate; 54.28544°N 0.39209°W	—	Mid to late 18th century	The house is in red brick with floor bands, moulded eaves and a pantile roof. There are three storeys and a basement, and three bays. The doorway in the left bay has fluted pilasters, a semicircular fanlight, a broken cornice on console brackets, and an open pediment. The windows are sashes with wedge lintels. The steps and basement area have iron railings with arrowheads and urn finials. At the rear is a two-storey bow window.	II
3 Merchant's Row; 54.28327°N 0.39538°W	—	Mid to late 18th century	The house is in red brick, the ground floor rendered, with boxed eaves and a slate roof. There are three storeys, a basement and an attic, and one bay. The doorway has reeded pilasters, a semicircular fanlight, an architrave and a keystone. The windows are casements, and the basement area has wrought iron railings with urn standards.	II
1 Newborough; 54.28233°N 0.40031°W		Mid to late 18th century	A shop on a corner site, it is stuccoed, and has chamfered rusticated quoins, a moulded floor band, a moulded eaves cornice and a slate roof. There are three storeys and four bays. The ground floor contains a modern shopfront, on the upper floors are sash windows, and on the middle floor of the right return is a canted bay window with a cornice.	II
39 Newborough; 54.28315°N 0.39729°W	—	Mid to late 18th century	The shop is in painted brick, and has a moulded floor band, a moulded dentilled cornice, and a tile roof. There are three storeys and three bays. The ground floor contains an altered 19th-century shopfront, with pilasters, and a cornice on long brackets, and to the right is a passage entry. On the upper floors are sash windows with cambered heads, and brick arches with console keystones, and on the roof is a dormer.	II
1 Palace Hill Terrace; 54.28381°N 0.39454°W		Mid to late 18th century	A house, later a hotel, in rusticated rendering on brick, with a pantile roof. There are two storeys, an attic and a basement, and four bays. The doorway has panelled reveals, an architrave with roundel corner blocks, a decorated radial fanlight, a broken entablature, scroll brackets and an open pediment. The windows are sashes and there are two flat-roofed dormers.	II
6 Palace Hill Terrace; 54.28396°N 0.39417°W		Mid to late 18th century	The house is in rendered brick, with string courses, a parapet with moulded coping, and a pantile roof. There are three storeys and three bays. The doorway in the right bay has engaged Corinthian columns, a decorated radial fanlight, a broken decorated entablature, and an open moulded pediment. The windows are sashes in flush architraves.	II
7 Palace Hill Terrace; 54.28399°N 0.39410°W		Mid to late 18th century	The house is in red brick, and has a parapet with moulded coping. There are three storeys and one bay. The doorway on the left has fluted Greek Doric columns and an entablature. The middle floor contains a rectangular bay window with pilasters, and the other windows are sashes.	II
11 and 11A Princess Street; 54.28477°N 0.39241°W	—	Mid to late 18th century	A pair of houses in red brick, the left house painted, with a wooden moulded cornice with block ornament, and a pantile roof. There are two storeys and cellars, and four bays. In the centre are paired doorways sharing a pulvinated frieze, a cornice and a dentilled pediment. The windows are sashes in architraves.	II
41 and 43 Quay Street; 54.28437°N 0.38880°W	—	Mid to late 18th century	A pair of houses in red brick with an eaves cornice and a pantile roof. There are two storeys and a basement, and three bays. Steps lead up to the doorways in the outer bays, the windows are sashes, and there is a dormer on the right.	II
18 Queen Street; 54.28408°N 0.39909°W		Mid to late 18th century	The house is in painted brick, with a moulded eaves cornice and a pantile roof. There are three storeys and two bays. The left bay contains a three-storey bow window. The right bay has a doorway with a semicircular fanlight, a cornice on fluted carved scroll brackets, and an open pediment, above which are sash windows.	II
Paradise House; 54.28618°N 0.39212°W		Mid to late 18th century	The house, at one time a training school, is in stuccoed red brick, with a floor band, a bracketed cornice on the north, and a slate roof. There are two storeys and an attic, and five bays. On the north front is a projecting porch with a cornice and blocking course, and round-headed side windows. The round-headed doorway has pilasters, an architrave, a semicircular fanlight, and a keystone. The windows are sashes. On the centre of the south front is a doorway with a moulded architrave, a cornice and pediment, and above it is a round-arched window.	II
St Thomas's Vicarage; 54.28542°N 0.39219°W	—	Mid to late 18th century	The house is in red brick, and has three storeys and three bays. The doorway in the left bay has fluted pilasters, a semicircular fanlight, a broken cornice on console brackets and an open moulded pediment. To its right is a canted bay window, and the other windows are sashes. Enclosing the front area are iron railings with arrow heads and urn finials.	II
Talbot House; 54.28389°N 0.39886°W	—	Mid to late 18th century	Two houses, and at one time a hotel, the building is in painted brick and has a slate roof. The central block has three storeys and a basement and four bays, floor bands, and an entablature with a triglyph frieze. There is a Greek Doric porch with fluted columns and an entablature, and to its left is a yard entrance infilled with a doorway. Above the porch is a bow window, and to the right is a two-storey bow window. The left extension has three storeys and two bays, and a bracketed frieze and cornice. The right bay contains a bow window with a moulded and dentilled cornice and iron cresting, and to its left is a plain round-arched doorway. The right extension has three storeys and a basement, and three bays. The doorway in the right bay has engaged Corinthian columns, a broken entablature, and an open pediment, and to its left is a two-storey canted bay window. The other windows in all parts are sashes, and the basement areas are enclosed by iron railings.	II*
The Mariners House; 54.28323°N 0.39548°W		Mid to late 18th century	A pair of houses in stone, with chamfered quoins, sill bands, a bracketed moulded eaves cornice, and a slate Mansard roof. There are three storeys and attics, and two bays. The central doorway has Doric piers, and a rusticated arch with false fanlight. This is flanked by canted bay windows, and above are sash windows and two flat-roofed dormers.	II
4 Burr Bank; 54.28493°N 0.38996°W	—	Late 18th century	The house is in red brick with a floor band, dentilled eaves and a pantile roof. There are two storeys and an attic, and three bays. The central doorway has reeded pilasters, an entablature and a pediment, and there is a smaller door with plain surround on the left. The windows are sashes, paired to the right of the doorway, and there are two gabled dormers.	II
25 and 27 Castlegate; 54.28563°N 0.39040°W	—	Late 18th century	A pair of houses in red brick, with a stone string course, a dentilled frieze and a pantile roof. There are two storeys and a lower ground floor, and three bays. In the centre, steps lead up to an elliptical-arched recess containing two doorways with semicircular fanlights. The windows on the upper two floors are sashes. The lower ground floor has two doorways, a sash window, and a casement window. The steps and front areas have railings.	II
29 and 31 Castlegate; 54.28567°N 0.39041°W	—	Late 18th century	A pair of red brick houses, with a string course and a pantile roof. There are two storeys and basements, and one bay each. The doorways are approached sideways by steps with wrought iron railings, each doorway with a semicircular fanlight, the right one blocked, a broken cornice, and a pediment hood on fluted scroll brackets. The windows are sashes, and there is a three-light flat-roofed dormer.	II
33 Castlegate; 54.28577°N 0.39044°W	—	Late 18th century	The house is in red brick with a string course and a slate roof. There are two storeys and one bay. The doorway on the left has an oblong fanlight, a broken cornice on fluted scroll brackets, and an open pediment. The windows are sashes, and there is a flat-roofed dormer.	II
68 Longwestgate; 54.28544°N 0.39391°W	—	Late 18th century	The house is in red brick with a stuccoed basement, a string course, dentilled eaves and a pantile roof. There are two storeys, a basement and an attic, and one bay. The doorway is approached by a sideways flight of steps with railings, under which is a doorway. The main doorway has an oblong fanlight and a pediment hood on scrolled brackets. The windows are paired sashes, and on the roof is a gabled dormer.	II
72 Longwestgate; 54.28546°N 0.39373°W	—	Late 18th century	The house is in red brick, with string courses, an entablature, a bracketed cornice and a pantile roof. There are two storeys, a basement and an attic, and three bays. Steps lead up to the doorway in the left bay that has a Doric surround and an oblong fanlight. The windows are sashes in architraves, and in the attic is a dormer. The steps and basement area have iron railings.	II
74 and 76 Longwestgate; 54.28547°N 0.39357°W		Late 18th century	The house is in red brick with a floor band, a stone frieze, a bracketed cornice and a pantile roof. There are two storeys, a basement and an attic, and five bays. Steps lead up to the central doorway that has engaged fluted Doric columns, an oblong fanlight, a reeded frieze with a roundel, and a cornice. The windows are sashes with wedge lintels, and there are two dormers. The steps and basement areas have railings.	II
113 Longwestgate; 54.28538°N 0.39272°W	—	Late 18th century	The house is stuccoed, and has a sill band, a cornice with a triglyph frieze, and a pantile roof. Thee are two storeys and a basement, and two bays. Steps with iron railings lead up to the doorway in the right bay that has an oblong fanlight, panelled strips, an architrave with a pattern above the door, and a moulded cornice on long reeded scroll brackets. The windows are sashes. The basement area is enclosed by railings.	II
125 Longwestgate; 54.28555°N 0.39140°W	—	Late 18th century	The house is in red brick, stuccoed on the front, with string courses, a bracketed wooden cornice, and a pantile roof. There are two storeys and a basement, and two bays. The round-arched doorway in the right bay is approached by steps, and has reeded pilasters, a semicircular fanlight, a broken cornice on narrow console brackets, and an open pediment with a panelled soffit. The windows are sashes, and the basement area is enclosed by a wall.	II
127 and 129 Longwestgate; 54.28557°N 0.39126°W	—	Late 18th century	A pair of houses in red brick with string courses, a bracketed wooden cornice, and a pantile roof. There are two storeys and basements, and six bays. The doorways are paired in the centre, with oblong fanlights, Doric pilasters, and a shared entablature with a triglyph frieze and a Doric pediment. The windows are sashes with wedge lintels. The steps and basement areas have iron railings with urn finials.	II
133 and 135 Longwestgate; 54.28560°N 0.39103°W	—	Late 18th century	Two houses in red brick with floor bands, an eaves band and brackets to flat eaves, and basements. The right house has two storeys, the left house has two, and each house has one bay. Both doorways are approached by steps and are arched, and each has a blind semicircular fanlight, a broken cornice on thin console brackets, and an open pediment. The steps and basement areas have cast iron railings.	II
31 Newborough; 54.28305°N 0.39781°W	—	Late 18th century	A house, later a shop, on a corner site, it is stuccoed, and has a floor band, an eaves cornice, and a half-hipped pantile roof. There are three storeys, and two bays on the front. The ground floor contains a modern shopfront, and on the upper floors are sash windows with slightly cambered heads. On the right return is a doorway with a semicircular fanlight, panelled pilasters with fluted necking, a broken entablature with oval plaques, and an open moulded pediment.	II
5 and 7 Princess Street; 54.28470°N 0.39267°W	—	Late 18th century	A pair of houses in rendered brick on a plinth, with a pantile roof. There are two storeys and three bays. Steps with wrought iron railings and scrapers lead up to the doorways that are paired in the centre in a large arched recess. The window above them is blind, and the others are sashes.	II
9 Princess Street; 54.28473°N 0.39254°W	—	Late 18th century	The house is in brick with a slate roof. There are three storeys and two bays. The doorway on the right has pilasters, an oblong fanlight and a cornice, and the windows are sashes.	II
12 Princess Street; 54.28489°N 0.39247°W		Late 18th century	The house is in red brick, with floor bands, a bracketed eaves cornice, and a pantile roof. There are three storeys and a basement, and five bays. Steps lead up to the central doorway that has an architrave, a semicircular fanlight, a pediment hood on console brackets, and a panelled soffit with roundels. The windows are sashes in architraves, with wedge lintels and keystones. The steps and basement areas have railings.	II
13 and 15 Princess Street; 54.28481°N 0.39227°W	—	Late 18th century	A pair of houses in red brick on a stone plinth, with painted stucco floor bands, a wooden frieze, a flat cornice and a pantile roof. There are three storeys and an attic, and five bays. The doorways are paired in the centre, and have architraves and oblong fanlights. The windows are sashes with wedge lintels, and there are two flat roofed dormers.	II
20 and 22 Princess Street; 54.28495°N 0.39212°W	—	Late 18th century	A pair of red brick houses, the left painted, with a floor band, a wooden triglyph frieze a moulded eaves cornice, and a pantile roof. There are two storeys, basements and attics, and each house has one bay. Steps lead up to the paired central doorways that have reeded architraves and flat cornice hoods. The left house has two-storey rectangular bay windows, the right house has paired sash windows, and both houses have a dormer. The steps and basement areas have railings.	II
24 Princess Street; 54.28498°N 0.39201°W	—	Late 18th century	The house is in rendered brick, with a floor band and a pantile roof. There are three storeys and an attic and two bays. In the right bay, a flight of steps leads up to a doorway on the middle floor with an oblong fanlight. The windows are sashes, paired on the ground floor, and there is a dormer. The steps are flanked by iron rails and along the street are railings with urn finials.	II
26 Princess Street; 54.28499°N 0.39194°W	—	Late 18th century	The house is in red brick with a pantile roof. There are three storeys and an attic, and one bay. A flight of curving stone steps leads up to the doorway on the middle floor, with an oblong fanlight. The window in the attic is a small casement, and the others are sashes. The sash windows and doorway have wedge lintels.	II
27 and 29 Princess Street; 54.28496°N 0.39143°W	—	Late 18th century	A pair of houses in red brick on a plinth, with a frieze, a gutter cornice and a pantile roof. There are three storeys and three bays. The paired doorways in the centre have oblong fanlights, and a doorcase of reeded pilasters, a frieze and a cornice. Above the doorways are blind windows, and the outer bays contain sash windows.	II
32 and 34 Princess Street; 54.28531°N 0.39128°W	—	Late 18th century	A pair of stuccoed houses, with floor bands, a parapet with moulded coping, and a pantile roof. There are four storeys and attics, and six bays. On the front is a doorway and a lattice porch, and the windows are sashes.	II
39 and 41 Princess Street; 54.28507°N 0.39085°W	—	Late 18th century	A pair of red brick houses on a stone plinth, with a triglyph wood frieze, a gutter cornice and a pantile roof. There are three storeys and two bays. The doorways have reeded pilasters, a three-light fanlight, a frieze and a cornice. The windows are sashes with wedge lintels.	II
7 Prospect Place; 54.28284°N 0.39690°W	—	Late 18th century	A house in red brick with a cornice, three storeys and two bays. The central doorway has fluted pilasters, a false semicircular radiating and wreathed fanlight, a broken entablature and an open pediment.	II
37 Quay Street; 54.28439°N 0.38896°W	—	Late 18th century	The house is in red brick with string courses and a pantile roof. There are three storeys and a basement, and one bay. Steps lead up to the doorway on the left, and the windows are sashes.	II
39 Quay Street; 54.28438°N 0.38889°W	—	Late 18th century	The house is in rendered brick with a floor band and a tile-hung attic. There are two storeys and a basement, a mansard attic, and one bay. On the right, steps lead up to a doorway with an architrave, and the windows are sashes.	II
5 Queen Street; 54.28342°N 0.39836°W		Late 18th century	The house is in red brick, with floor bands, a frieze and a slate roof. There are three storeys, a basement and an attic, and three bays. The doorway in the right bay is approached by steps, and has engaged Corinthian columns, a semicircular fanlight, a broken entablature with a vase in relief, and an open pediment. The windows are sashes with flat gauged arches, in the basement is a tripartite sash window, and the attic has a wide dormer. The steps and basement area have cast iron railings with shaped arrow heads.	II*
7 Queen Street; 54.28354°N 0.39847°W		Late 18th century	The house is in red brick, with chamfered rusticated quoins, a moulded cornice and blocking course, and a slate roof. There are three storeys, a basement and an attic, and three bays. The doorway in the right bay is approached by steps, and has engaged Corinthian columns, a semicircular fanlight, a broken entablature with a vase in relief, and an open pediment. The windows are sashes, and there is a gabled dormer. The steps and basement area have iron railings with double scrolled leaf heads.	II*
17 Queen Street; 54.28404°N 0.39906°W	—	Late 18th century	The house is in painted brick with a pantile roof. There are three storeys and a basement, and one bay. Steps with spearhead railings lead up to a doorway on the right, with an oblong fanlight, and the windows are sashes.	II
39 Queen Street; 54.28400°N 0.39862°W	—	Late 18th century	The building is in red brick, with floor bands and a moulded modillion cornice. There are four storeys and three bays. The ground floor contains a projecting modern shopfront and a passage entry to the right. On the upper floors are sash windows with keystones and flat gauged brick arches.	II
40 Queen Street; 54.28397°N 0.39859°W		Late 18th century	A shop in rendered brick, with floor bands, four storeys and one bay. The ground floor contains a projecting modern shopfront. On the middle two storeys is a canted bay window, above which is a sash window.	II
15 Sandside; 54.28426°N 0.39122°W	—	Late 18th century	The building is in painted brick, and has a roof with gable coping on the right. There are three storeys, a basement and attics, and three bays. The central doorway has fluted pilasters, a blind semicircular fanlight, a broken entablature, a frieze with moulded ornament, and an open pediment. The ground floor contains modern windows, and elsewhere the windows are sashes.	II
21 and 23 Sandside; 54.28416°N 0.39059°W	—	Late 18th century	The building, which has been altered, is stuccoed, and has floor bands, a cornice, a balustrade between brick pillars, and a pantile roof. There are three storeys and an attic, and fronts of three bays. On the ground floor are modern shopfronts. The left return contains a doorway with an architrave and a cornice on console brackets, and sash windows. The south front has a square bay window on the middle floor of the left bay, and above is a modern window, the middle bay contains sash windows, and on the right bay is a two-storey bow window.	II
25 and 26 Sandside; 54.28419°N 0.39021°W	—	Late 18th century	Two buildings in stone, with pantile roofs, and modern fronts on the ground floor. The left building has three storeys and four bays. The upper floor contains sash windows, and above is a coped parapet with rusticated rendering. The right building has three storeys and an attic, and the front is gabled. The middle floor contains a square bay window with a cornice, and above are sash windows.	II
15 St Mary's Street and 107 Longwestgate; 54.28532°N 0.39326°W	—	Late 18th century	The house on a corner site is in red brick with stone quoins, an eaves band and a pantile roof. The main block has two storeys and a basement, and four bays. The doorway has panelled pilasters, a semicircular fanlight, thin reeded scroll brackets, a broken entablature and an open pediment. To its right is a canted shopfront with a small doorway. The windows are sashes with flat stucco arches. The Longwestgate front contains a doorway and various windows.	II
24 and 25 St Mary's Street; 54.28489°N 0.39297°W	—	Late 18th century	A pair of houses in red brick with a pantile roof. There are two storeys, an attic and a cellar, and two bays. In the centre is a segmental-headed recess containing two doorways approached by steps with iron railings, with oblong fanlights. The windows are sashes with segmental heads.	II
29 and 30 St Nicholas Street; 54.28198°N 0.39880°W	—	Late 18th century	Two houses, later shops, with three storeys, containing a common early Victorian shopfront with pilasters, thin corner mullions to the windows, a frieze and cornice. The left shop is in painted brick with four bays, a moulded cornice and a blocking course, and the upper floors contain sash windows. The right shop is stuccoed and has a slate roof and three bays. The outer bays on the middle floor have bow windows, and above them are sash window and dormers. The middle bay has a blind window in each upper floor.	II
1 Vernon Road; 54.28103°N 0.40131°W	—	Late 18th century	The house, on a corner site, is in brick on a stone plinth, with a wooden frieze and gutter cornice, and a pantile roof. There are three storeys and two bays. On the front are sash windows with wedge lintels. The doorway is on the left return, and has engaged Greek Doric columns, an entablature and an oblong fanlight, and above it are two windows, the top one with a round head.	II
2 Vernon Road; 54.28099°N 0.40126°W	—	Late 18th century	The house is in brick on a stone plinth, with a wooden frieze and gutter cornice, and a slate mansard roof. There are three storeys and an attic, and two bays. On the left of the ground floor is a doorway with engaged Greek Doric columns, an entablature with a triglyph frieze, and an oblong fanlight. The middle floor contains a large bow window, the other windows are sashes, and in the attic are two dormers.	II
4 and 6 Vernon Road; 54.28093°N 0.40119°W		Late 18th century	The house, later used for other purposes, is in red brick with a pantile roof. There are three storeys, cellars, and three bays. In the centre, steps lead up to a porch with a recessed doorway. The porch has pilasters, a frieze and a bracketed cornice. The outer bays of the middle floor each contains a bow window, with an entablature, a small cornice, and a curved apron. The other windows are sashes.	II
Former Castle Hotel; 54.28435°N 0.39895°W		Late 18th century	Three houses, later a hotel, subsequently converted into flats, the building is in brick, with floor bands, a moulded frieze, a gutter cornice, and a slate roof. There are three storeys and attics, the main block has five bays, the extension to the left has four bays, and the extension to the right has three. The centre doorway has engaged Roman Doric columns with flanking half-pilasters, an architrave, a semicircular fanlight, a broken entablature with a triglyph frieze, and an open pediment. The windows are sashes, most with flat-arched heads, those above the doorway with round-arched heads and keystones. On each extension is a two-storey canted bay window, and in the extreme right bay is a round-arched carriage entrance with a keystone.	II
25 St Sepulchre Street; 54.28419°N 0.39454°W	—	c. 1790–1800	The house is in painted brick, the ground floor stuccoed, with a moulded eaves cornice on modillion brackets, and a slate roof. There are three storeys and three bays. Steps lead up to the doorway in the left bay, with thin panelled strips, a semicircular fanlight, and an open moulded pediment on fluted console brackets. The windows are sashes, those on the middle floor with pilasters and segmental arches, the tympani decorated as blind radial fanlights.	II
15 St Nicholas Cliff; 54.28066°N 0.39926°W	—	1793	A house in a terrace, it is in painted brick, with a triglyph frieze and an eaves cornice. There are four storeys, a basement and an attic, and two bays. The doorway in the right bay is approached by steps, and has engaged composite Corinthian columns, a semicircular fanlight, a broken entablature with urns in relief, and an open dentiled pediment. Above are sash windows, one with a balcony. To the left is a four-storey canted bay window. The top floor contains three square casement windows. The steps and basement area have iron railings with urn finials.	II
32 Queen Street; 54.28461°N 0.39913°W		c. 1800	The house is in red brick with a bracketed moulded cornice and a slate roof. There are three storeys and a basement, and three bays. Steps lead up to the entrance in the right bay, with Ionic engaged columns, an entablature with a reeded-fluted frieze, a moulded dentilled cornice, and a triangular pediment. The doorway has panelled reveals, and a semicircular fanlight, and is deeply recessed in a lobby, that has intersecting barrel vaulted ceiling, and an arched opening to the front with a moulded architrave and imposts. The windows are sashes, those on the ground floor with architraves, panelled aprons, and flat gauged brick arches. The basement contains a doorway and a horizontally sliding sash window. The steps and basement area have wrought iron railings with turned baluster standards, and small urn finials.	II*
Lighthouse; 54.28196°N 0.38991°W		1800	The lighthouse, on Vincent's Pier, was badly damaged in 1914, and subsequently largely rebuilt. It is in stone, circular and tapering, and has a lantern with a shallow lead dome and a ball finial. Adjoining it is the keeper's house, with two storeys, five bays and a flat roof.	II
Steps, rails, terrace and shops, Palace Hill Terrace; 54.28386°N 0.39426°W		18th or 19th century	Flights of stone steps at each end lead up to a raised pavement on a brick terrace. This is enclosed by iron spearhead railings with urn finials. Beneath the terrace are seven shops dating from the mid-19th century.	II
14–18 Princess Street; 54.28493°N 0.39229°W	—	18th to 19th century	Three stuccoed houses with pantile roofs. The left house has three storeys and two bays, and contains a doorway with an oblong fanlight, and sash windows. The two houses on the right have two storeys and two bays, and contain modern casement windows and dormers.	II
33 Queen Street; 54.28453°N 0.39913°W	—	Late 18th to early 19th century	The building is in red brick, with a moulded eaves cornice, and a slate mansard roof. There are three storeys and attics and three bays. The ground floor contains a double shopfront, above, the windows are sashes with flat stucco arches, and in the attic are three dormers.	II
22 Sandside; 54.28420°N 0.39070°W	—	18th to 19th century	A rendered cottage with rustication and a pantile roof. There are two storeys and a basement, and one bay. The doorway is in the basement, and the windows are sashes.	II
31 St Nicholas Street; 54.28210°N 0.39888°W	—	Late 18th to early 19th century	The shop is stuccoed, and has a block cornice and a coped parapet. There are three storeys and two bays. The ground floor has a modern shopfront. The middle floor contains a shallow tripartite bow window with a frieze and a moulded cornice, and the other windows are sashes with keystones.	II
5 and 7 St Sepulchre Street; 54.28394°N 0.39593°W	—	Late 18th to early 19th century	A pair of houses with rusticated cement rendering, a wooden triglyph frieze, and a pantile roof. The doorways are paired in the centre, with oblong fanlights, pilasters, a frieze and a moulded cornice, and the windows are recessed sashes.	II
10 and 10A St Sepulchre Street; 54.28409°N 0.39581°W	—	Late 18th to early 19th century	A pair of houses in red brick with a pantile roof. There are three storeys and two bays. On the ground floor are two doorways and a passage door to the left, all with oblong fanlights. The windows are sashes in moulded frames with flat gauged brick arches.	II
14 and 16 St Sepulchre Street; 54.28414°N 0.39560°W	—	Late 18th to early 19th century	A pair of houses in red brick on a stone plinth, the left house pebbledashed, with a moulded eaves board and a pantile roof. The doorways have oblong fanlights, the windows are sashes, and on the roof are two dormers.	II
8 Whitehead Hill; 54.28458°N 0.39091°W	—	Late 18th to early 19th century	The house is stuccoed and has a pantile roof. There are three storeys and an attic, and one bay. Steps with a wooden balustrade lead up to the doorway that has a cornice hood on console brackets, and there is another doorway under the landing. The windows are sashes and there is a dormer.	II
St Peter's Centre; 54.28457°N 0.39425°W	—	1801	A Friends' Meeting House, later used for other purposes, it is in red brick with dentilled eaves and a hipped slate roof. There is a single storey and three bays. It has a porch with a hipped roof, and contains sash windows with flat gauged arches.	II
27–31 St Sepulchre Street; 54.28420°N 0.39433°W	—	c. 1820	A row of three red brick houses, one painted, with an eaves board on paired brackets, and a pantile roof. There are three storeys and five bays. The right two doorways are paired and all the doorways have oblong fanlights, reeded pilasters, a frieze, and a shallow moulded cornice. To the extreme left is a round-arched passage entry. Most of the windows are sashes, on the right is a former shop window, and above the paired doorways are blind windows.	II
Former Midland Bank; 54.28223°N 0.39900°W	—	c. 1820	The building is in stone with a ground floor cornice, a sill band, an entablature and a modillion dentiled cornice. There are three storeys and five bays. The ground floor contains a large three-light window, flanked by doorways, each with a rusticated surround, an architrave, an oblong fanlight, a cornice and a keystone. On the upper floors are sash windows in architraves, those on the middle floor with alternate triangular and segmental pediments.	II
90–98 Castle Road; 54.28596°N 0.39964°W	—	c. 1820–30	A terrace of five houses in red brick with some yellow headers, a moulded eaves cornice and a slate roof. There are three storeys and each house has two bays. The left house has a shop window on the ground floor and a two-storey canted bay window above. To the right is a round-arched passage entry, and a doorway with fluted pilasters, a broken entablature, a semicircular fanlight, and an open pediment-hood. The other doorways have pilasters, entablatures, oblong fanlights and cornices. The right house has a three-storey canted bay window, and the other windows are sash windows, some are blind, and they have flat stucco arches.	II
29 Newborough; 54.28297°N 0.39807°W	—	c. 1820–30	The shop is in painted stucco. There are three storeys, and an attic above a projecting dentilled moulded cornice and a frieze. On the upper two floors are four Ionic pilasters on moulded bases, and the windows are sashes. The ground floor contains a modern shopfront.	II
6 Queen Street; 54.28348°N 0.39842°W	—	c. 1820–30	A house, later a shop, in stone, with moulded sill bands, a moulded cornice and a slate roof. There are three storeys and attics, and three bays. Three steps lead up to the doorway in the right bay, that has a moulded architrave, an oblong fanlight, and a cornice on scroll brackets. To the left is a shopfront dating from the late 19th to the early 20th century. The upper floors contain recessed sash windows, and there are three dormers.	II
1–5 Bedford Street; 54.28415°N 0.40312°W		Early 19th century	A terrace of five cottages in red brick, with shallow flat moulded eaves, and a hipped slate roof. There are two storeys and each cottage has one bay. The doorways are on the left, and each has an oblong fanlight, an architrave, a frieze and a moulded cornice, and the windows are sashes with wedge lintels.	II
19–22 Bedford Street; 54.28364°N 0.40292°W	—	Early 19th century	A terrace of four houses in red brick on a plinth, with stucco pilasters, a stucco frieze, a moulded eaves cornice and a hipped slate roof. There are two storeys and nine bays. The left two doorways have oblong fanlights, an architrave, a frieze, and a moulded cornice, and between them is a round-headed passage entry. The right two doorways have semicircular fanlights and round gauged brick arches. The windows are a mix; some are sashes, some are modern, and some are blind.	II
31 and 33 Castle Road; 54.28429°N 0.40317°W	—	Early 19th century	A pair of cottages in red brick, with shallow flat moulded eaves and a hipped slate roof. There are two storeys, the left house has two bays, and the right house has three. The doorways have architraves, and a moulded cornice over a frieze, the left door has a semicircular fanlight, and the fanlight of the right house is oblong. The windows are sashes with flat stucco arches.	II
19 Eastborough; 54.28341°N 0.39584°W		Early 19th century	Two shops on a corner site in red brick with a pantile roof and a rounded hip on the corner. There are three storeys, one bay on Eastborough, and two on Leading Post Street. On the front is a 19th-century shopfront with pilasters, a central doorway with a fanlight, a frieze and a modillion cornice on shaped brackets. The return contains a smaller shopfront with pilasters, a frieze and a moulded cornice, and a doorway to the right. On the upper floors are sash windows in architraves.	II
13 and 14 Falconer's Road; 54.28092°N 0.40041°W	—	Early 19th century	The building is stuccoed, and has a frieze and a moulded cornice. There are three storeys, three bays on the front, two bays on the right return, and a curved bay on the corner. The ground floor contains a modern shopfront. Above, the left bay has a two-storey canted bay window. On the middle bay are paired sash windows on the top floor, and blind windows below. The right and corner bays have modern windows, and on the right front is a three-storey canted bay window.	II
3 King Street; 54.28289°N 0.39773°W	—	Early 19th century	Originally a hotel, the house is in painted brick, with floor bands, a shallow eaves band and a slate roof. There are four storeys and four bays, the right bay slightly recessed. The doorway has panelled pilasters, a semicircular fanlight, and a cornice on console brackets. The windows are sashes, and in the right bay is a garage door with a cornice on brackets.	II
22 King Street; 54.28265°N 0.39777°W	—	Early 19th century	A house, previously a shop or public house, it is stuccoed, and has a cornice and a blocking course. There are two storeys and two bays. The ground floor contains a former shopfront with a central doorway flanked by Doric pilasters, a panelled frieze, and a cornice with acroteria. On the upper floor are sash windows in architraves.	II
115 Longwestgate; 54.28539°N 0.39261°W	—	Early 19th century	The house is in stuccoed stone, with a sill band, a projecting cornice and a blocking course, and a pantile roof. There are two storeys and a basement, and two bays. On the left bay is a porch with Doric columns, an entablature and a projecting cornice, containing steps that lead up to a doorway with a semicircular fanlight. The windows are recessed sashes, and on the roof is a small dormer. The steps and basement area have iron railings.	II
123 Longwestgate and school 54.28545°N 0.39193°W	—	Early 19th century	A large house in white brick, with a sill band, a parapet and a slate roof. There are three storeys and a basement, and five bays. In the centre is a stucco porch with two pairs of Ionic columns and pilasters, and an entablature. The doorway has a panelled reveal and a semicircular fanlight, and the windows are sashes with flat stucco arches. The basement area is enclosed by cast iron railings, To the left is a school dating from 1873 in Gothic style. Ii is in polychromatic brick and stone, and has a square tower.	II
131 Longwestgate; 54.28559°N 0.39115°W	—	Early 19th century	The house is in red brick, with a wooden frieze, and a cornice on pairs of brackets, and a slate roof. There are three storeys, a basement and an attic, and two bays. Steps lead up to the doorway in the right bay that has panelled strips, a rectangular fanlight, and a cornice on console brackets. The windows are sashes, those on the lower two floors with wedge lintels, and in the attic is a dormer. The steps and basement area have cast iron railings with spear heads.	II
2 Princess Street; 54.28475°N 0.39290°W	—	Early 19th century	A house in painted red brick with a pantile roof. There are three storeys and three bays. In the centre is a doorway with a moulded flat hood on cut brackets. To its left is a plain shopfront, over which is a canted bay window with a cornice and a panelled apron. The other windows are sashes, those on the lower two floors under elliptical arches.	II
4–8 Princess Street; 54.28481°N 0.39273°W	—	Early 19th century	Three houses in red brick with a pantile roof. There are three storeys and three bays. On the front are two doorways with semicircular fanlights, the right one blocked, and an open pediment on scrolled brackets. To the right of the left doorway is a double shopfront with a moulded surround, a frieze, and a cornice on brackets. The windows are sashes with flat brick arches.	II
Garden wall and terrace between 26 and 28 Princess Street; 54.28499°N 0.39171°W	—	Early 19th century	The garden wall is in rendered stone, and contains gate and end piers. The gates are in wrought iron. Behind these is a rendered retaining terrace wall with a flight of steps and railings.	II
28 and 30 Princess Street; 54.28509°N 0.39149°W	—	Early 19th century	A pair of red brick houses, the right house painted, on a plinth, with floor bands, a small cornice and a pantile roof. There are three storeys and basements; the left house has three bays, and the right house has four. Steps lead up to the doorways, each with a Doric surround, three-light fanlights, pilasters and an entablature. The windows are sashes with wedge lintels, and the steps and basement areas have spear head railings.	II
47 Princess Street; 54.28511°N 0.39051°W	—	Early 19th century	The house is in red brick with bracketed flat eaves and a slate roof. There are three storeys and three bays. The central doorway has panelled pilasters, an oblong fanlight and an entablature, and the windows are sashes.	II
1–5 Prospect Place; 54.28278°N 0.39681°W	—	Early 19th century	A terrace of red brick houses with a slate roof. There are four storeys at the south and three at the north, and each house has two bays. The windows are sash windows, and at the north are brick porches.	II
8–12 Queen Street; 54.28366°N 0.39863°W	—	Early 19th century	A row of five buildings in red brick, roughcast or rendered, with eaves cornices, three storeys, and shopfronts on the ground floor. The upper floors contain sash windows, and canted bay windows with one or two storeys.	II
19 and 19A Queen Street; 54.28414°N 0.39914°W	—	Early 19th century	The house is in red brick, with a moulded wooden frieze to the eaves and a pantile roof. There are three storeys and three bays. The central doorway has Doric pilasters and an oblong fanlight. The windows on the middle bay are blind, the outer bays contain sash windows, and all have flat stucco arches.	II
2 Tollergate; 54.28531°N 0.39692°W	—	Early 19th century	The house is in red brick on a rendered plinth with a pantile roof. There are two storeys and two bays. The doorway has an oblong fanlight, the windows are sashes in architraves, and all the openings have wedge lintels. On the roof are two flat dormers.	II
3 Tollergate; 54.28540°N 0.39691°W	—	Early 19th century	The cottage is in red brick with an eaves band and a pantile roof. There are two storeys and one bay. The doorway is on the right, there is a casement window in each floor, and all the openings have segmental brick arches with blind painted tympani.	II
11 Tollergate; 54.28564°N 0.39699°W	—	Early 19th century	The house is in brick, with rusticated cement rendering and a pantile roof. There are three storeys and one bay. The doorway on the right has a pediment hood on thin shaped brackets, and the windows are sashes.	II
26–32 Vernon Road and 6 Cliff Bridge Place; 54.27994°N 0.39960°W	—	Early 19th century	The buildings are in red brick with slate roofs. The building facing the road has five storeys and five bays. The ground floor contains a public house front with Doric pilasters and an entablature, on the middle floor are two bow windows, and the other windows are sashes, some blind. Behind is a terrace of five houses in painted brick with three storeys and basements. Each house has two bays, and contains a doorway with an oblong fanlight and a cornice hood, a three or four-storey canted bay window, and the other windows are sashes.	II
112–114 Westborough; 54.28211°N 0.40146°W	—	Early 19th century	Two shops, the upper floors in painted brick, with a frieze and an eaves cornice. There are three storeys and five bays. The ground floor contains modern shopfronts, and on the upper floors are three two-storey bow windows with tripartite sash windows. Between them are blind windows on the middle floor, and sash windows on the upper floor.	II
11–18 York Place; 54.28026°N 0.40281°W		Early 19th century	A terrace of eight houses in vitreous brick, with a moulded cornice and a slate roof. There are three storeys and basements, and each house has two bays. The left bay of each house contains a full height segmental bow window, and on the right bay, steps lead up to a doorway that has a Greek Doric doorcase with two columns and an entablature, above which are sash windows. Projecting shopfronts have been added to two houses, and the others have railings flanking the steps and enclosing the basement areas.	II
19 York Place; 54.28007°N 0.40260°W	—	Early 19th century	A house on a corner site at the end of a terrace, it is in vitreous brick, with a moulded cornice and a hipped slate roof. There are three storeys and basements, and two bays on the front. The left bay contains a full height segmental bow window, and on the right bay, steps lead up to a doorway that has a Greek Doric doorcase with two columns and an entablature, above which are sash windows. Flanking the steps and enclosing the basement area are railings. The left return has three bays, with a central Greek Doric porch with two columns on the front and pilasters at the rear, and it is surmounted by a balcony. The porch is flanked by canted bay windows.	II
Park Lodge and Park Dene; 54.27914°N 0.40001°W		Early 19th century	The house is in stone, with wide flat eaves on cut brackets, and a slate Mansard roof. There are two storeys, attics and a basement, and a west front of four bays. This front contains sash windows, those in the outer bays with an architrave, a frieze and a cornice, and on the attic are dormers. The north front has three bays and contains a central Greek Doric porch, and a doorway with a two-light fanlight. To the south is an extension, Park Dene, which is stuccoed, and has two storeys and an attic. In the centre is a two-storey bow window.	II
The Royal Hotel; 54.28153°N 0.39864°W		Early 19th century	The hotel, which was extended in 1860 and later, is on a curved corner site. It is stuccoed, and has a cornice, a parapet, four storeys and a complex plan. The main front has two and three-storey canted bay windows with Corinthian colonnettes, and along the middle two floors are continuous balconies. The doorway is flanked by Composite columns.	II
Cliff Bridge; 54.27919°N 0.39833°W		1826–27	The footbridge, also known as Spa Bridge, was widened in 1880. It is 414 feet (126 m) in length, and consists of four segmental iron arches on tapering stone piers with stone abutments.	II
Rotunda Museum; 54.27944°N 0.39928°W		1828–29	The original part of the museum is the rotunda, with wings added in 1860. It is in stone, the original part with a circular plan and two storeys, the ground floor rusticated on a moulded plinth. The upper floor has Tuscan pilasters, the bays containing windows, a moulded entablature, and a shallow domed roof with a lantern. The wings are lower with one storey, three bays and segmental bowed ends.	II*
1 to 6 Museum Terrace, wall and steps 54.27961°N 0.39899°W		c. 1830	A terrace of six houses stepped up a hill, in stone, with sill bands and cornices. There are two storeys, one house also with an attic, and each house has two bays. On the ground floor are alternating four-centred arched windows and doorways, and the upper floor contains sash windows. From the terrace, a curved retaining wall and steps lead up the hill.	II
9 and 11 Falsgrave Road; 54.27852°N 0.40937°W	—	c. 1830–40	A pair of houses in red brick, the ground floor painted, with sill bands, a frieze, a moulded cornice, and a slate roof. There are three storeys and four bays. On the centre are three doorways with oblong fanlights, fluted pilasters, a frieze with roundel corner blocks, and a dentilled cornice. These are flanked by shallow segmental bow windows with an entablature and a bracketed cornice, and the upper floors contain sash windows with flat stone arches.	II
Front wall, 9 and 11 Falsgrave Road; 54.27845°N 0.40925°W	—	c. 1830–40	Along the front of the garden is a dwarf stone wall.	II
21 Falsgrave Road; 54.27837°N 0.40984°W		c. 1830–40	The house, later used for other purposes, is stuccoed and has a hipped slate roof. There are two storeys and an attic, and three bays. The outer bays contain full height wide bow windows under a moulded cornice. On the centre of the ground floor is a portico with four fluted Greek Doric columns and an entablature, and a doorway with a two-light oblong fanlight. Flanking the house are screen walls, each with a cornice and a balustrade flanked by scrolls.	II
Front wall, 21 Falsgrave Road; 54.27829°N 0.40973°W	—	c. 1830–40	The dwarf stone wall runs along the pavement, and contains plain central and corner piers.	II
Trinity House; 54.28414°N 0.39473°W		1832	The hospital was founded in 1602 and its building was rebuilt by R. H. Sharp. It is in stone on a plinth, with sill courses, and a moulded projecting eaves cornice. There are three storeys and five bays, the middle three bays projecting. The central doorway has panelled strips and a cornice on brackets, and an oblong fanlight. The window above has a similar surround and a balustraded balcony. The windows are sashes in architraves. At the top is a full width panel with lettering, dates and a motif. In front of the outer bays are cast iron spear head railings.	II*
Belvoir Terrace; 54.28023°N 0.40178°W		1832–3	A straight terrace of seven houses built in two phases, the second phase in 1856–57. They are in stone, the ground floor with horizontal rustication, and have a hipped slate roof. Most of the houses have four storeys and three bays, and the six bays at each end project slightly. Steps with iron railings lead up to the doorways, which have architraves and oblong fanlights. Above the ground floor is a stone balcony with decorative cast iron railings. Between the houses on the upper two floors are pilasters and an entablature, and the middle floor contains French windows.	II*
The Crescent; 54.27942°N 0.40279°W		1832–34	A curved terrace of 15 houses built in two phases, the second phase in 1856–57. They are in stone, the ground floor with horizontal rustication, and have a hipped slate roof. Most of the houses have three bays, and the six bays at each end project slightly. Steps with iron railings lead up to the doorways, which have architraves and oblong fanlights. Above the ground floor is a stone balcony with decorative cast iron railings, between the houses on the upper two floors are pilasters, the middle floor contains French windows, the other windows are sashes, and on the roofs are dormers.	II*
The White House; 54.28008°N 0.40065°W	—	1835	The house is roughcast, with chamfered quoins, deep eaves on brackets and a slate roof. There are two storeys, an entrance front of four bays, and a garden front with five bays, the middle bay slightly projecting under a low gable. The windows are recessed sashes with shutters, and on the roof are dormers.	II
Gates and gate piers, The White House; 54.28000°N 0.40100°W	—	c. 1835	The gate piers are stuccoed, and have cornice caps. The gates are in wrought iron, and have large dog rails, scrollwork and a swept superstructure.	II
Woodend; 54.27849°N 0.40233°W		1835	The house is in stone with a string course, a cornice and a blocking course, and a hipped slate roof. There are two storeys and an attic, fronts of five bays, and a two-storey extension on the west. On the north front is a doorway with incised panelled pilasters, scroll brackets and a cornice, and the windows are sashes. The east front has a tall stair window, and on the south front is a continuous balcony on a segmental arched arcade.	II*
24–29 Bedford Street; 54.28391°N 0.40319°W	—	Early to mid-19th century	A terrace of five houses in red brick, with shallow moulded flat eaves on paired brackets, and a hipped slate roof. There are two storeys and ten bays. The doorways have oblong fanlights, panelled reveals, pilasters, and cornice hoods on console brackets. On the ground floor is a round-arched passage entry, and the windows are sashes with wedge lintels.	II
8–24 Bar Street; 54.28213°N 0.40009°W		Early to mid-19th century	A terrace of shops and houses in red brick with a wooden eaves band and a cornice. Nos. 14–24 have three storeys, and each building has one bay. The upper floors of each building contain a two-storey segmental bow window with an entablature and an apron. Nos. 8–12 have three storeys, bracketed eaves, sash windows between the bow windows, and round-headed windows on the top floor. Along the ground floor are continuous shopfronts with Corinthian pilasters and entablatures.	II
36–44 Bar Street; 54.28154°N 0.39942°W	—	Early to mid-19th century	A row of shops and houses in red brick, one stuccoed, with a frieze, an eaves band, and a slate roof. There are three storeys and each building has two bays. The ground floor contains mainly shopfronts with Tuscan pilasters, a frieze and a moulded cornice. On the upper floors are sash windows with flat gauged brick arches.	II
3-9 Falconer's Square; 54.28114°N 0.40035°W		Early to mid-19th century	A group of seven stuccoed houses arranged around a square, later used for other purposes. There are three storeys and attics, and each house has two bays. The right bay contains a full-height canted bay windows, and on the left bay is a doorway with reeded pilasters and an entablature, above which are sash windows.	II
Wilson's Mariners' Homes; 54.28646°N 0.39836°W		1836	A range of houses in rendered brick on a stone base, with a stone cornice, a coped parapet and a slate roof. There is a single storey and 12 bays, the middle three and the end bays projecting slightly with coped gables. The windows have flat heads and three lights, each with an ogee cusped head, and hood moulds. The doorways have fanlights with similar heads. In 1922 an extension in red brick with two storeys was added to the west end.	II
Londesborough Lodge; 54.27913°N 0.40123°W		1839	The house was extended in 1853, and later used for a variety of different purposes. It is in stone and has bracketed moulded overhanging eaves and a shallow hipped slate roof. There are two storeys and an irregular plan, consisting of a projecting main block with three bays, and splayed wings with one bay each. The doorway has panelled pilaster strips and a cornice on console brackets, and the windows are sashes. The garden front has a canted projection with a balcony.	II
6–15 Aberdeen Terrace; 54.28304°N 0.40196°W	—	c. 1840	A terrace of houses in red brick with grey headers, some painted, with shallow eaves and a slate roof. There are two storeys and each house has two bays. The doorways have pilasters, friezes, and moulded projecting cornices. The windows are sashes, some blind, with flat stucco arches.	II
1–7 Cliff Bridge Terrace; 54.27984°N 0.39929°W		c. 1840	A terrace of seven stuccoed houses, with rusticated basement and ground floors, sill bands, a frieze and a projecting eaves cornice, and a slate roof. There are four storeys, basements and attics, and 18 bays. Steps with railings lead up to the doorways that have oblong fanlights. Above the ground floor is a continuous cast iron balcony on stone brackets. The windows in the attics and dormers are casements, and elsewhere they are sashes, those on the upper three floors in architraves, and those on the first floor with cornices on wreathed brackets.	II
3–8 and 8A West Square; 54.28033°N 0.40636°W		c. 1840	A terrace of seven houses in painted brick, with a sill course, a moulded frieze, a shallow eaves cornice and a slate roof. There are three storeys and each house has two bays. The doorways have stuccoed pilaster strips, oblong fanlights, and cornices on moulded console brackets. The windows are a mix of sashes and casements, four houses have two-storey canted bay windows, there is one later single-storey bay window, and a three-light bow window.	II
5–10 York Place; 54.28058°N 0.40321°W		c. 1840	A terrace of six houses faced in stone, with moulded string courses and sill bands, and a moulded eaves cornice. There are three storeys and each house has two bays. The right bay contains a three-storey bow window with Doric pilasters between the windows on the middle floor. On some of the houses, steps with railings lead up to a doorway in the left bay, with architraves, panelled strips, and moulded cornices on console brackets, and the others have projecting shopfronts.	II
Public Library; 54.28120°N 0.40146°W		1840	The library is in stone, with two storeys and five bays, the middle three bays recessed, and a canted bay on the right corner. In the centre of the ground floor are four Greek Doric columns and an entablature, and windows in all bays. The upper floor has four Ionic columns and an entablature, and in each bay is a recessed arched panel containing a wreath in the tympanum. At the top is a panelled parapet, projecting over the outer bays.	II
St Thomas's Museum; 54.28450°N 0.39151°W		1840	Originally a church, the north aisle was added in 1857, and it has since been used for other purposes. The church is in red brick with stone dressings and a slate roof, and has embattled parapets. There are panelled buttresses at the east and west ends, and at the east end is a stuccoed porch with an embattled parapet.	II
4–13 Castle Crescent; 54.28593°N 0.39004°W		c. 1840–50	A shallow crescent of houses in grey brick, with a sill band, a moulded eaves cornice, and a slate roof. There are two storeys and basements, and the two houses at each end of the crescent project slightly. The doorways have architraves and oblong fanlights. One house has a projecting three-storey slate-hung bay window. Some windows are blind, and there are dormers of differing types.	II
146–152 Castle Road; 54.28692°N 0.39435°W		c. 1840–50	A row of four stuccoed houses, each with three storeys and basements, and two bays. The doorways are approached by flights of steps with cast iron railings, and have oblong fanlights. The middle two houses form a central projecting gabled block with paired doorways in the centre, flanked by canted bay windows. Above these are tripartite windows with a cornice, between them is a blind window with a segmental pediment, and the top floor has sash windows. The outer houses form flanking wings, and each house has sash windows, those on the middle floor in architraves with triangular pediments and balconies.	II
101–105 Longwestgate; 54.28532°N 0.39347°W	—	c. 1840–50	A row of three houses in yellow brick, with a frieze and flat eaves, and slate roof. There are three storeys and each house has one bay. The doorways on the left are approached by steps, and each has panelled stucco pilasters, a rectangular fanlight, a frieze and a projecting cornice. The windows are recessed sashes, with slightly cambered gauged brick arches.	II
6 and 7 Princess Terrace; 54.28477°N 0.39182°W	—	c. 1840–50	Two stuccoed houses in a terrace, with flat eaves and slate roofs. No. 6 has three storeys and three bays, a doorway with a blind fanlight and sash windows. No. 7 has two storeys and two bays, and a doorway with pilasters, a semicircular fanlight, an architrave arch, and consoles. To its left is a two-storey canted bay window with pilasters, and over the doorway is a round-headed window.	II
37 and 38 Queen Street; 54.28407°N 0.39872°W	—	c. 1840–50	Two rendered houses, the ground floor rusticated with a cornice above, the left house also with a frieze, and a moulded eaves cornice. There are three storeys, basements and attics, and each house has three bays. Steps lead up to round-arched doorways that have a semicircular fanlight and a vermiculated keystone. The windows are sashes, round-headed with vermiculated keystones on the ground floor, and in eared architraves above, and the left house has three dormers. The steps and basement areas have cast iron railings.	II
The former Cliff Hotel; 54.28105°N 0.39991°W		c. 1840–50	The hotel is stuccoed, and has three storeys and attics, and bowed corners. The ground floor has a rusticated public house front with pilasters flanking the doorways. Above are a string course, a main moulded cornice and a parapet. The windows are sashes, and there are two two-storey segmental bow windows on the upper floors. The windows in the bow windows and on the curved corners have Corinthian pilasters.	II
Scarborough railway station 54.27998°N 0.40525°W		1844–45	The station was designed by G. T. Andrews for the York and North Midland Railway, and there have been later alterations and additions. It is built in stone with slate roofs. In the centre of the front is a pavilion, this is flanked by wings of nine bays and end pavilions. All the pavilions have pediments, and between them are glazed roofs. On the central pavilion is an elaborate Baroque clock tower with a lead dome. Behind the front is the passenger train shed.	II
Scarborough Art Gallery; 54.27888°N 0.40155°W		1845	Originally Crescent Villa, it was extended in the 1850s, and later converted into an art gallery. It is in stone, and the original block has two storeys and three bays, the middle bay projecting. This block has chamfered rusticated quoins, a panelled floor band, and projecting dentilled eaves cornices. The central doorway has a round arch, a rusticated surround with chamfered voussoirs and a keystone, and narrow sidelights. The outer bays contain sash windows, each on a moulded plinth, with an eared architrave and a keystone. Above, the middle bay has paired pilasters between which is a window with an archivolt, and balustrades between the pilasters. The outer bays contain sash window, each with balustrades, flanking panelled strips and a cornice on console brackets. The extension to the west has one storey, two bays, a central chimney with a pierced arch, and balustrades.	II*
Town Hall; 54.28176°N 0.39819°W		1845	Originally a private house, it was altered and converted into the town hall in 1901–03. The building is in red brick on a plinth, with stone dressings, quoins, a string course, a cornice, and a parapet, and there are two storeys and attics. On the left and in the centre are three-storey bays with Dutch gables and finials, each containing a two-storey canted bay window. The windows in the ranges between are mullioned with rusticated surrounds. At the right end are two turrets with lead ogee domes, and between them is a two-storey oriel bow window. On Nicholas Street are three bays, the middle bay projecting under a Dutch gable. This contains the entrance that has banded engaged Ionic columns on pedestals, and a triglyph entablature surmounted by a scroll cartouche with flanking pyramidal finials.	II
41 and 43 Eastborough; 54.28358°N 0.39464°W		c. 1850	Two shops in red brick with sill bands, a moulded eaves cornice and a hipped slate roof. There are three storeys and an attic, and three bays, the right bay curved. The ground floor contains two 19th-century shopfronts with pilasters, panelled doors, a frieze, and a common moulded cornice. On the upper floors are recessed sash windows with flat gauged brick arches, and on the attic are two flat-roofed dormers.	II
21, 23 and 25 Princess Street; 54.28486°N 0.39191°W	—	Mid-19th century	A row of three stuccoed houses with two storeys, and two bays each. There are three round-arched doorways, the right two paired, each with pilasters, a semicircular fanlight, an architrave, and a console keystone. The windows are sashes, on the upper floor they are alternately round-headed, and one is blind. On the left front are two tripartite windows and a two-storey canted bay window.	II
36A and 36B Queen Street; 54.28415°N 0.39883°W	—	Mid-19th century	The house is stuccoed, and has rusticated quoins, and a moulded frieze and cornice. There are three storeys, a basement and an attic, and two bays. The doorway in the left bay is approached by steps, and has a semicircular fanlight, flanking panelled strips, an architrave arch with imposts and a scrolled keystone, and a pediment on elaborate console brackets. Above are sash windows, the one on the middle floor with a cornice. The right bay contains a four-storey canted bay window. The steps and basement area have cast iron railings.	II
Brewery Stores; 54.28250°N 0.39774°W	—	Mid-19th century	The former dray loading bay and stabling is in painted red brick with a sill course, stepped eaves and a pantile roof. There are two storeys and four bays. In the second bay is a round-arched cart entrance with imposts and a keystone, converted into a window, and the other bays contain segmental-arched openings converted into windows. On the upper floor are casement windows.	II
9–12 West Square; 54.28040°N 0.40677°W	—	c. 1850	A terrace of four stuccoed houses, with a sill course, a moulded frieze, a gutter cornice, and a slate roof. There are three storeys, and each house has two bays. The doorways have panelled flanking strips, oblong fanlights, and projecting cornices on heavy console brackets. The windows are sashes, those on the middle floor in architraves, and those on the ground floor are tripartite.	II
13–23 West Square; 54.28011°N 0.40724°W		c. 1850–60	A row of 11 houses on two sides of a square. Nos. 13 and 14 have four storeys, the other houses have three storeys and attics, and all have two bays. On Nos. 13 and 14 are paired doorways with rusticated surrounds, semicircular fanlights and a cornice. These are flanked by tripartite sash windows, and above are sash windows in architraves. Nos. 15–18 have doorways with semicircular fanlights and rusticated arches. Nos. 19–23 have doorways with architraves, oblong fanlights and triple keystones, and to the right is a two-storey canted bay window.	II
St Thomas' Hospital; 54.28290°N 0.39550°W		c. 1850–60	Built as the Royal Northern Sea Bathing Infirmary, it has since been used for other purposes. It is in yellow brick with overhanging eaves and a slate roof. There are three storeys, a central range of three bays, projecting wide gabled cross-wings, and a two-bay extension on the right. The ground floor contains modern shopfronts. On the cross-wings are segmental-arched recesses each containing three round-arched windows in both floors, the middle ones with keystones. The central range contains French windows, and each floor has a cast iron balcony. On the extension are segmental-arched windows with keystones.	II
Public Market Hall; 54.28384°N 0.39659°W		1853	The market hall is in stone, with a rusticated basement. There are seven bays, the outer bays flanked by rusticated pilasters. The other bays contain round-headed arches with three-quarter Doric columns, the outer ones with doorways and the others with windows. Above is a large cornice, and a pediment containing a semicircular window. The outer bays contain circular motifs. Flanking the hall are lower wings containing round-headed blind arches.	II
St Peter's Church; 54.28634°N 0.39751°W		1858	The Roman Catholic church, designed by George Goldie, is in stone. It consists of a nave with a clerestory, a polygonal apse without windows, and a low square tower base with a low pyramidal roof. The tower base contains a doorway with a pointed arch and double doors, over which is elaborate tracery. At the north end in a large five-light window, and elsewhere the windows have two lights.	II
The Old Alexandra Music Hall; 54.28197°N 0.40220°W	—	1859	The music hall, later used for other purposes, has a ground floor in red brick, the upper floor is stuccoed, and it has a dentilled cornice, a panelled parapet and a slate roof. There are two storeys and three bays. The ground floor has pilasters and an entablature. The centre of the upper floor is recessed, and contains three tall round-headed windows. The outer bays have rusticated quoins, and each contains a tall round-headed window.	II
34 Queen Street; 54.28446°N 0.39910°W	—	c. 1860	The house is in red brick, with stone dressings, sill bands, a moulded eaves cornice, and a slate mansard roof. There are three storeys and three bays. The doorway on the left has an oblong fanlight, and the windows are sashes in architraves, the central window on the middle floor with a cornice on console brackets, and a segmental pediment. On the roof are three flat-headed dormers.	II
Bridge over Vernon Road; 54.27963°N 0.39973°W		c. 1860–70	The foobridge links Crescent Gardens to Cliff Bridge Terrace. it is in cast iron, with trefoils in the spandrels, and ornate scrolled ironwork in the pointed panels of the balustrade.	II
Westborough Methodist Church; 54.27945°N 0.40752°W		1862	The church is in stone. On the front is a tetrastyle Corinthian portico with an entablature and a pediment, flanked by square towers with angle Corinthian pilasters. A broad flight of steps leads up to three arched doors with moulded surrounds and vermiculated keystones. The towers have a bell stage with angle Roman Ionic pilasters, a cornice and a pediment. Along the sides are two storeys and five bays, and small stepped pinnacles.	II
Clifton Hotel; 54.29056°N 0.40483°W		1863–64	A large hotel in colourwashed and rendered brick, with painted stone dressings, a string course and slate roofs. There are four storeys and an L-shaped plan, with two ranges at right angles, each with nine bays, with alternating full-height canted bays and flat-fronted bays. The windows are sashes. At the southeast corner is a five-storey five-sided tower with a finial.	II
Grand Hotel; 54.28048°N 0.39812°W		1863–67	A large hotel designed by Cuthbert Brodrick, it is in yellow brick, with dressings in moulded red brick and terracotta, on a plinth of rusticated stone. There is a V-shaped plan, with four domed towers on the corners. The entrance front has four storeys, a basement and a two-storey attic, and 21 bays, the outer three bays projecting. Above the ground floor is an almost continuous iron balcony on large console brackets. In the centre is a three-bay arched porch with paired Composite columns in antis, and the right end is bowed. The sea front has 19 bays, and a projecting four-storey basement with a central bow, and the top storey is in glass.	II*
The Towers; 54.28722°N 0.39210°W		1866	A large house in rock-faced stone with machicolated battlements. There is a two-storey centre range flanked by three-storey turrets, outside which are single-storey wings. In the centre are double doors flanked by buttress piers with a moulded arch in Norman style. The windows are casements with pointed heads and hood moulds. To the right is a conservatory with iron cresting.	II
Albemarle Baptist Church and schoolroom 54.28248°N 0.40486°W		1867	The church, designed by H. F. Lockwood, is in stone and white brick with a slate roof. It consists of a nave, aisles, transepts, a chancel and a south tower. The tower has two stages, with lancet windows in the lower stage, above which is a moulded string course, and bell openings under a crocketed gable, surmounted by an octagonal spire. The entrance has a triple arch with circular piers and polychromatic arches, above which is a large six-light window with a pointed arch. Attached to the northeast is a schoolroom with a canted front.	II
Albemarle Baptist Church Cottage; 54.28240°N 0.40507°W		1867	A minister's house designed by H. F. Lockwood, it is in white brick with stone dressings, dentilled eaves and a slate roof with stone coped gables and kneelers. There are two storeys, and the gable end faces the street. The windows have triangular heads, and on the east front is a porch.	II
35 St Nicholas Street; 54.28236°N 0.39915°W	—	c. 1870 (or earlier)	Formerly the Town Hall, later shops, the building is in stone, the outer bays slightly projecting and rusticated. It has a panelled frieze, a moulded cornice and a balustraded parapet. There are three storeys and seven bays. The outer bays contain round-headed aches, the left a doorway, the right an entrance, both with rusticated Corinthian pilasters, and cornices on brackets, and between them are shopfronts. The upper floors have sash windows, those on the top floor are square with eared moulded architraves. On the middle floor they have flanking strips with guilloché moulding, panelled aprons, and pediments, those in the outer bays segmental and the others triangular.	II
4 Palace Hill Terrace; 54.28390°N 0.39432°W		Late 19th century	The rebuilding of an 18th-century house, it is in red brick with string courses, three storeys and two bays. On the centre of the middle floor is a canted bay window. The other windows are sashes, those on the ground floor with round-arched heads. Also on the ground floor, to the left, are two round-arched doorways.	II
Scarborough Excursion Station; 54.27856°N 0.40755°W		1883	The station was built by the North Eastern Railway. The buildings are in yellow brick with stone dressings, and the platform canopies are of iron with Welsh slate and glazed roofs. The platform front has 12 bays, most with round or segmental-arched heads, and the northeast front has seven bays with round-headed openings. Other features include a pedestrian tunnel, cab and pedestrian ramps, a rock-faced coped retaining wall with iron railings and a long wooden bench.	II
Main block, Convent of the Ladies of Mary; 54.28494°N 0.39967°W	—	1884	The building, designed by Frederick Walters in Gothic style, is in red brick with stone dressings. There are three storeys, a gabled wide centre bay, flanked by six bays on each side. The entrance is arched and contains an arched doorway with side lights. The windows on the lower two floors are in arched arcades, and between the windows on the top floor are pointed capped stone piers.	II
Former Constitutional Club; 54.28152°N 0.40047°W		1888	The club building is in red brick with stone dressings and a Welsh slate roof, and is in mixed Tudor and Baroque styles. There are two storeys and an attic, and an irregular front of nine bays. The main doorway is round-arched and flanked by pillars, and has a keystone and carving in the tympanum. Above is an open pediment on giant consoles, and statues of heraldic beasts with shields carved with coats of arms. There are two outer doorways with flat heads, semicircular fanlights, and scrolled friezes. On the upper floor are cross windows, to the left is a hexagonal oriel window, over which is a turret, and towards the centre is an ornate shaped gable.	II
4 Westborough; 54.28215°N 0.40077°W		1890	The bank on a corner site is in terracotta, and has three storeys and an attic, three bays on each front, and a canted bay on the corner. This bay contains the entrance that has an ogee crocketed arched fanlight, flanked by recessed octagonal foliate-capped piers. Above it is an oriel window with a shaped copper roof and a finial. Other features include three stepped gables with finials, a canted oriel window on the middle floor on the front, and mullioned windows with blind tracery in the tympani.	II
Former Westwood School; 54.27817°N 0.40464°W		1897–1900	The school, designed by Edwin Cooper, is in red brick with stone dressings and red tile roofs. It consists of a main block with three storeys and eight bays, flanked by three-storey gabled cross-wings. These are linked by lower ranges to the main entrances, and beyond them are two-storey classroom ranges. Surmounting the centre of the school is a tall three-stage octagonal lantern, with columns in the upper stages, and a domed cap. On the front are six carved relief panels by Henry Charles Fehr depicting academic subjects.	II
Newcastle Packet Inn; 54.28427°N 0.39144°W		1898–99	The public house, which was extended in about 1920, incorporates carved timber framing dating from about 1500. It is built in brick and stucco with applied modern timber framing, and has a tile roof. There are two storeys and an irregular plan, with a front of two gabled bays. The ground floor has a central doorway and is almost completely glazed. The windows on the upper floor have four lights, the middle two lights being slightly bowed on a timber bracket. The extension to the right has a splayed gable.	II
Seating shelter and terrace, St Nicholas Gardens; 54.28184°N 0.39652°W		1904–07	The terrace and shelter is divided into two parts, flanking the entrance to the gardens. The roof of the shelter provides a viewing platform and is enclosed by iron railings. The shelters are carried on an arcade of slender cast iron columns and segmental arches. The columns have swagged Ionic capitals, and ornamental ironwork in the spandrels with rose motifs. Above is a cornice with keystones.	II
Falsgrave Signal Box; 54.27660°N 0.40922°W		1908	The signal box was built by the Southern Division of the North Eastern Railway. The lower storey is in brick, on a plinth, the upper storey is glazed on the front with some weatherboarding on the sides, and it has a slate roof. There are seven bays, each containing a sash window on the lower storey. On the gable end is a wooden external staircase leading up to the doorway. Inside there is a lever frame of 120 levers.	II
Post Office; 54.28252°N 0.40251°W		1909	The building is in red brick and stone on a polished marble plinth, with a slate roof. There are 11 bays, the middle five bays projecting with three storeys, flanked by two-storey wings, and ending in single-bay pavilions. The ground floor is in stone, and the central doorway has a moulded surround, Ionic columns, a keystone, and a large segmental pediment with an inscribed and dated plaque. Above, are two giant Ionic pilasters and a pediment. The windows are sashes with moulded surrounds and keystones, those on the middle floor with pediments. The pavilions have circular windows at the top, the left one with a carriage arch and the right one with a round-arched window.	II
Police Telephone Box; 54.28392°N 0.39182°W		c. 1920	The telephone box is in wood and has a square plan. The walls are divided into panels, and each side contains a window with marginal glazing. At the top is a triglyph frieze and a cornice, and a shallow pyramidal roof surmounted by a police call sign.	II
Mecca Bingo Club; 54.28154°N 0.40384°W		1928–29	Originally the Capitol Cinema, later used as a bingo hall, it has a steel frame, the front is in white faience, on a plinth, and the other walls are in brick. Above the central entrance is a canopy and there are four more entrances with moulded surrounds and keystones. Above the main entrance are three tall round-headed windows, over which is a pediment with a coved cornice and a cartouche. At the top is a decorated frieze with central lettering.	II
Pair of telephone kiosks 54.28041°N 0.40571°W		1935	The K6 type telephone kiosks were designed by Giles Gilbert Scott. Constructed in cast iron with a square plan and a dome, they have three unperforated crowns in the top panels.	II
Stephen Joseph Theatre; 54.28053°N 0.40588°W		1936	Originally the Odeon Cinema, it was altered internally in 1996 into a theatre-in-the-round. It is in Modernist style, in pale brick with black, red and cream ceramic tiles. The entrance is in the curved corner under a fascia and a canopy, over which is a café with a curved glass front. Above is a six-storey with a red-striped fin and a glazed stair shaft. Along the Northway front are modern shopfronts.	II
Wall east and south of Paradise House; 54.28624°N 0.39141°W	—	Undated	The wall is in stone it is coped, and has a rendered top. The wall runs along Paradise, and turns into Castlegate.	II
Queen Victoria Memorial Statue; 54.28152°N 0.39820°W		Undated	The statue of Queen Victoria, by Charles Bell Birch, is in bronze, and depicts the queen standing on a polished granite pedestal with a cornice.	II
Retaining wall and railings, Scarborough railway station 54.28019°N 0.40477°W	—	Undated	The retaining wall extending along Valley Bridge Road is in rock-faced stone. On the wall are iron railings with fleur de lys heads.	II
Walls, railings and gate, St Peter's Centre; 54.28437°N 0.39410°W	—	Undated	The walls are in brick with stone coping. On the walls are wrought iron spike railings with twisted dog rails and scrolled standards with finials. The gates are similar and have an overthrow.	II
