= St Thomas' Hospital, Scarborough =

Hospital building in Scarborough, North Yorkshire, England

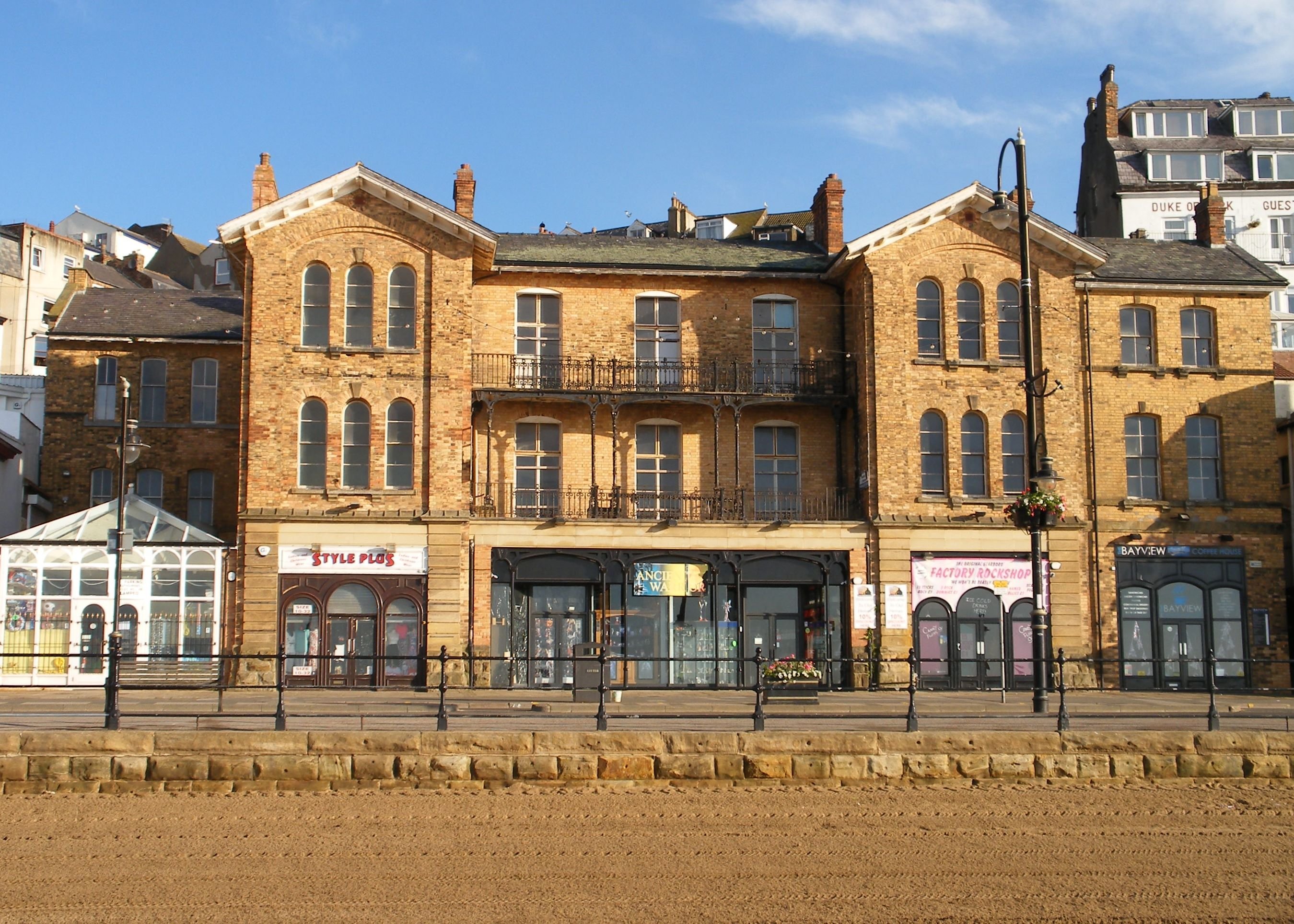
The building, in 2014

St Thomas' Hospital is a historic building in Scarborough, North Yorkshire, a town in England.

The building was constructed in 1861 as the Royal Northern Sea Bathing Infirmary. It accommodated up to 52 poor patients from across northern England, in order that they could take part in sea bathing as part of their treatment. The building was designed by William Baldwin Stewart, in the Italianate style. The ground floor contained saltwater baths, administrative rooms and kitchens, while there were wards on the upper floors. The building was later extended to the right. During World War I and World War II, the building served as a military hospital. The building was grade II listed in 1973, by which time it had been renamed "St Thomas' Hospital". The hospital later closed, and the ground floor was converted into six shops, while the upper floors became disused. In 2019, the property was marketed for sale for £2.25 million, with planning permission to convert the upper floors into flats.

The building is constructed of yellow brick with overhanging eaves and a slate roof. It has three storeys, a central range of three bays, projecting wide gabled cross-wings, and a two-bay extension on the right. The ground floor contains modern shopfronts. On the cross-wings are segmental-arched recesses each containing three round-arched windows in both floors, the middle ones with keystones. The central range contains French windows, and each floor has a cast iron balcony. On the extension are segmental-arched windows with keystones.

== See also ==
- Listed buildings in Scarborough (Castle Ward)
