= 9 Tuthill =

Building in Scarborough, North Yorkshire, England

Coordinates: 54°17′04″N 0°23′31″W

9 Tuthill is a historic building in Scarborough, North Yorkshire, a town in England.

The house was built in the early or mid 18th century. In the early 19th century, its facade was altered. The area was associated with the fishing industry, and in the mid 19th century, it was the family home of Matthew Bullamore, who was prominent in the trade. The house was grade II* listed in 1973, with Historic England noting that it forms a group with the other houses on the south side of the street.

The house is rendered and has chamfered stone quoins, a pantile roof, and two storeys. On the ground floor is a doorway to the right with an oblong fanlight, and a smaller door to the left. Between them, and on the upper floor, are sash windows, to the left of the upper floor window is a small casement window, and above is a dormer. Inside, there is a massive oak chimney piece.

== See also ==
- Grade II* listed buildings in North Yorkshire (district)
- Listed buildings in Scarborough (Castle Ward)
