= Leeds Arms =

Pub in Scarborough, North Yorkshire, England

Coordinates: 54°17′05″N 0°23′35″W

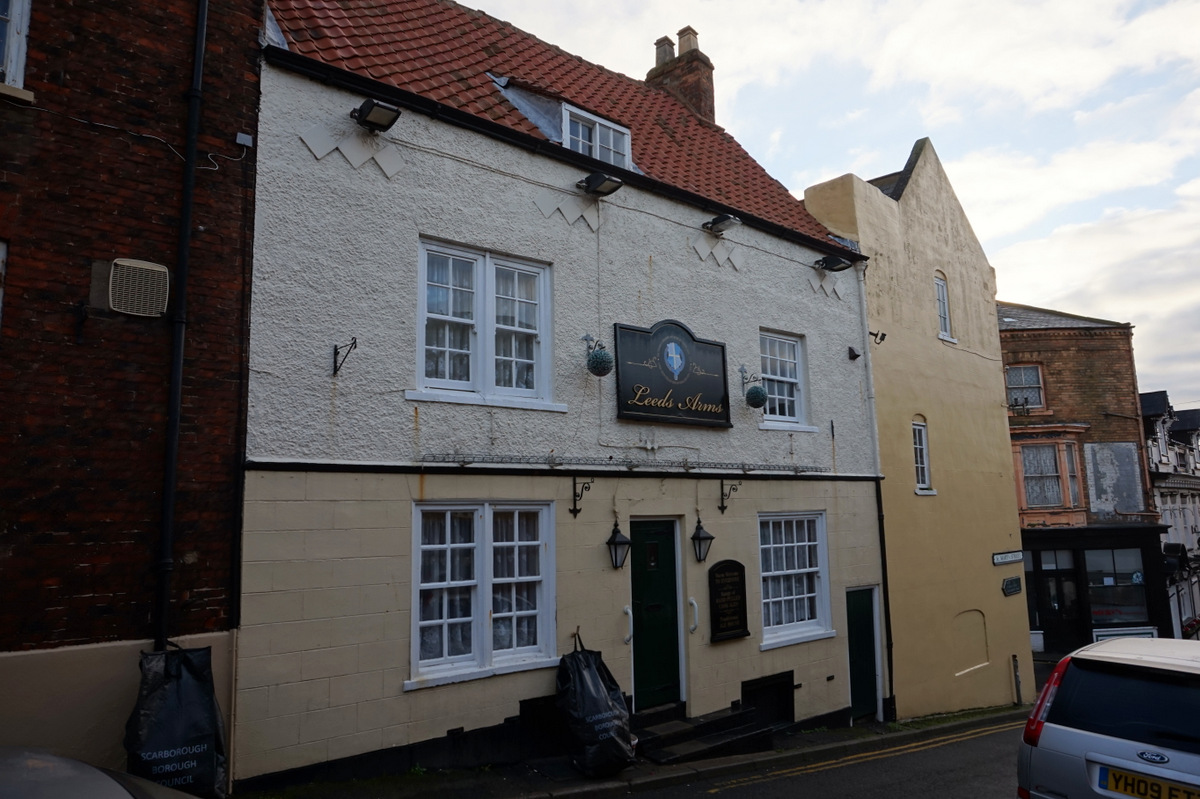
The pub, in 2017

The Leeds Arms is a historic pub in Scarborough, North Yorkshire, a town in England.

A terrace of three fishermen's cottages were built on St Mary's Street in about 1700. They were later converted into a single pub, which may be the oldest to survive in the town. The building was grade II listed in 1953. It was taken over by new landlords in 2020, who planned to focus on selling real ale, lager and cider and run it as a "proper, locals pub". Since 1990, it has hosted an annual pork pie baking contest.

The pub has a rendered ground floor, a pebbledashed upper floor, a gutter cornice and a pantile roof. There are two storeys and an attic, and two bays. The central doorway has a plain surround, there is a smaller doorway on the extreme right, the windows are sashes, and there is a dormer.

== See also ==
- Listed buildings in Scarborough (Castle Ward)
