= Westborough Methodist Church =

Church in Scarborough, North Yorkshire, England

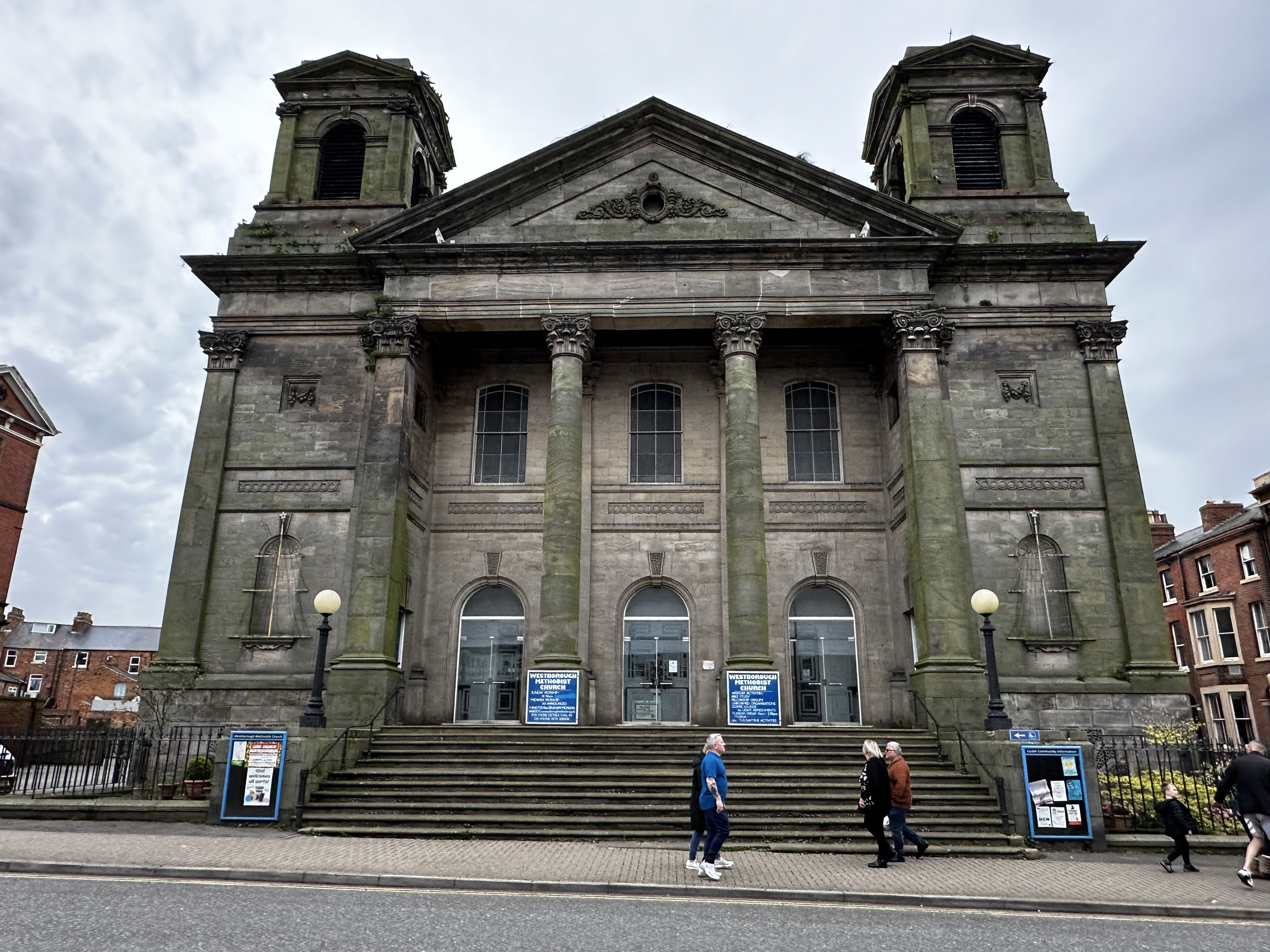
The building, in 2024

Westborough Methodist Church is a historic church in Scarborough, North Yorkshire, a town in England.

The church was built for the Wesleyan Methodist Church between 1860 and 1862, as its existing building on Queen Street was overcrowded. The building was designed by William Baldwin Stewart, and cost £7,700 to construct. Inside, it had an elaborate two-tier pulpit. The building was grade II listed in 1973.

The church is largely built of grey Whitby stone, while its curved rear wall is built of red brick. On the front is a tetrastyle Corinthian portico with an entablature and a pediment, flanked by square towers with angle Corinthian pilasters. A broad flight of steps leads up to three arched doors with moulded surrounds and vermiculated keystones. The towers have a bell stage with angle Roman Ionic pilasters, a cornice and a pediment. Along the sides are two storeys and five bays, and small stepped pinnacles.

== See also ==
- Listed buildings in Scarborough (Castle Ward)
