= The Towers, Scarborough =

Building in Scarborough, North Yorkshire, England

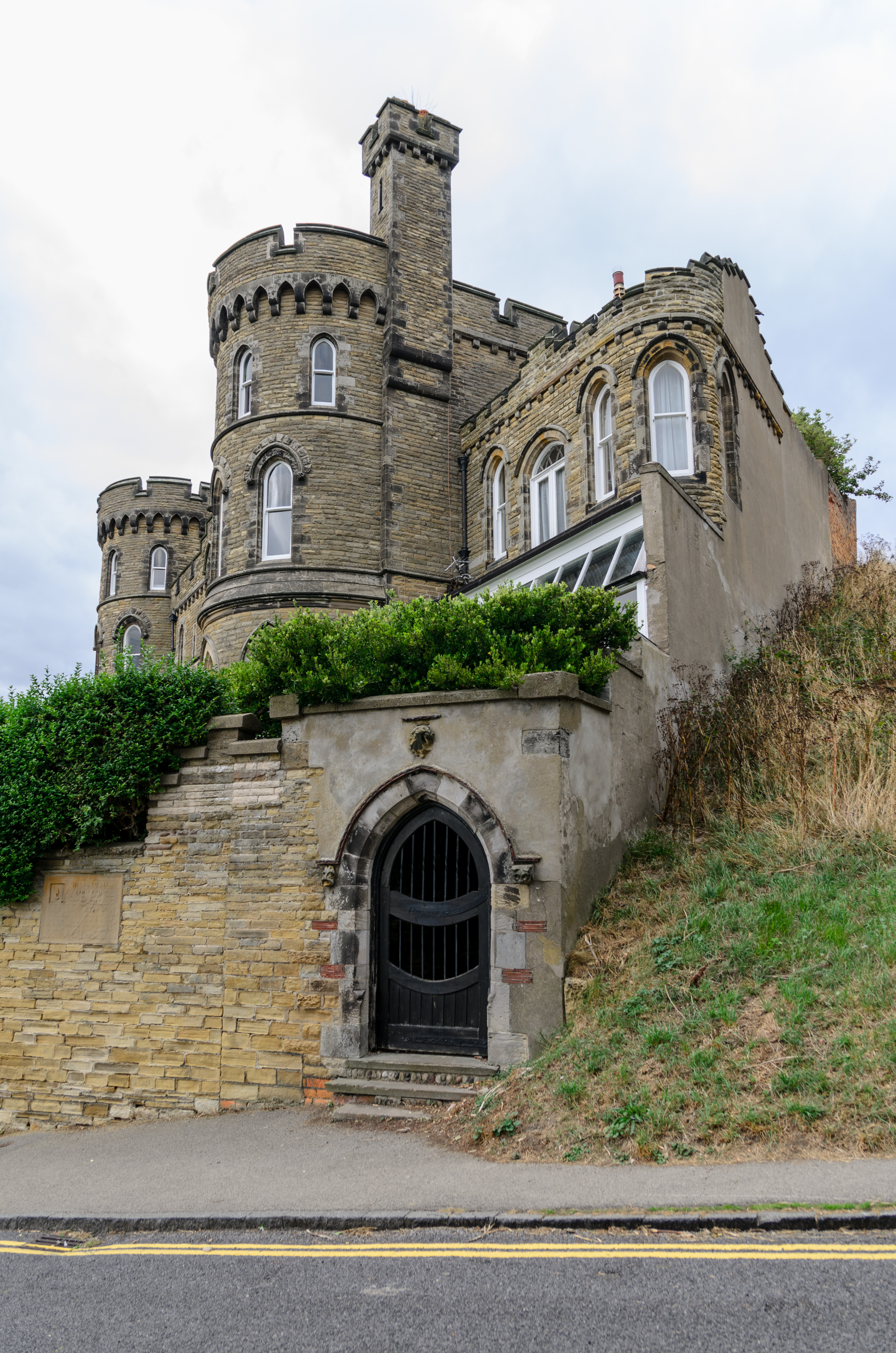
The building, in 2018

The Towers is a historic building in Scarborough, North Yorkshire, a town in England.

The house was built on the slope below Scarborough Castle and its castellation is designed to reflect the castle buildings. It was built in 1866 for the brewer Thomas Jarvis, to a design by William Baldwin Stewart. The Architect reportedly negatively on the building, describing it as "a feather-bed fortalice". The building was grade II listed in 1973.

The house is built of rock-faced stone with machicolated battlements. It has a two-storey centre range flanked by three-storey turrets, outside which are single-storey wings. In the centre are double doors flanked by buttress piers with a moulded arch in Norman style. The windows are casements with pointed heads and hood moulds. To the right is a conservatory with iron cresting.

== See also ==
- Listed buildings in Scarborough (Castle Ward)
