= 7 Queen Street =

Building in Scarborough, North Yorkshire, England

Coordinates: 54.2835°N 0.3985°W

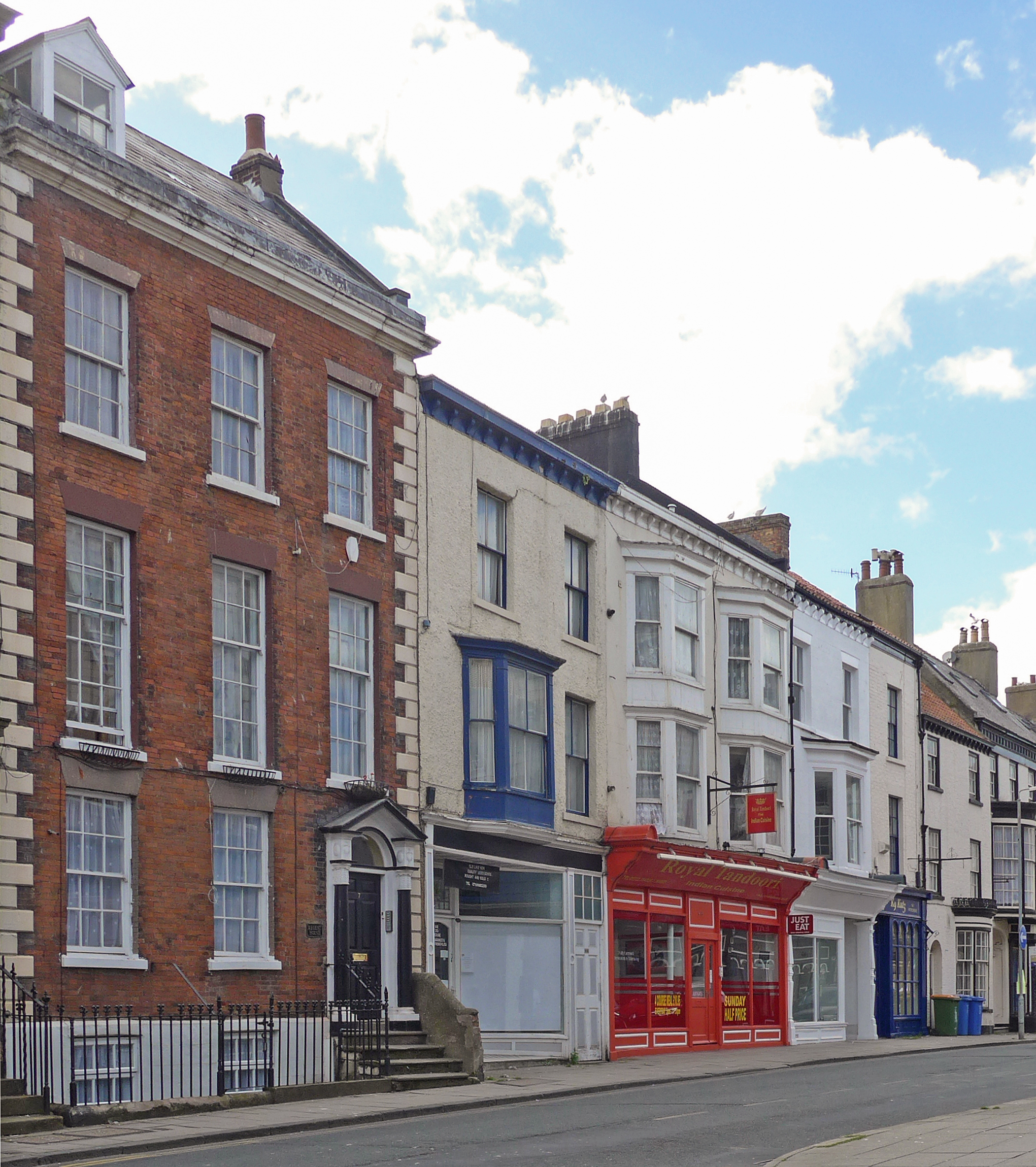
The building (on left)

7 Queen Street is a historic building in Scarborough, North Yorkshire, a town in England.

The house was constructed in the late 18th century, on Queen Street in the centre of Scarborough. Iron railings were added to the front in the 19th century. The building was grade II* listed in 1953. Historic England notes that it forms part of a group with 5, 6 and 8 to 13 Queen Street.

The house is built of red brick, with chamfered rusticated quoins, a moulded cornice and blocking course, and a slate roof. There are three storeys, a basement and an attic, and three bays. The doorway in the right bay is approached by steps, and has engaged Corinthian columns, a semicircular fanlight, a broken entablature with a vase in relief, and an open pediment. The windows are sashes, and there is a gabled dormer. The steps and basement area have iron railings with double scrolled leaf heads. Inside, the original staircase survives.

== See also ==
- Grade II* listed buildings in North Yorkshire (district)
- Listed buildings in Scarborough (Castle Ward)
