= Belvoir Terrace =

Building in Scarborough, North Yorkshire, England

Coordinates: 54.2802°N 0.4017°W

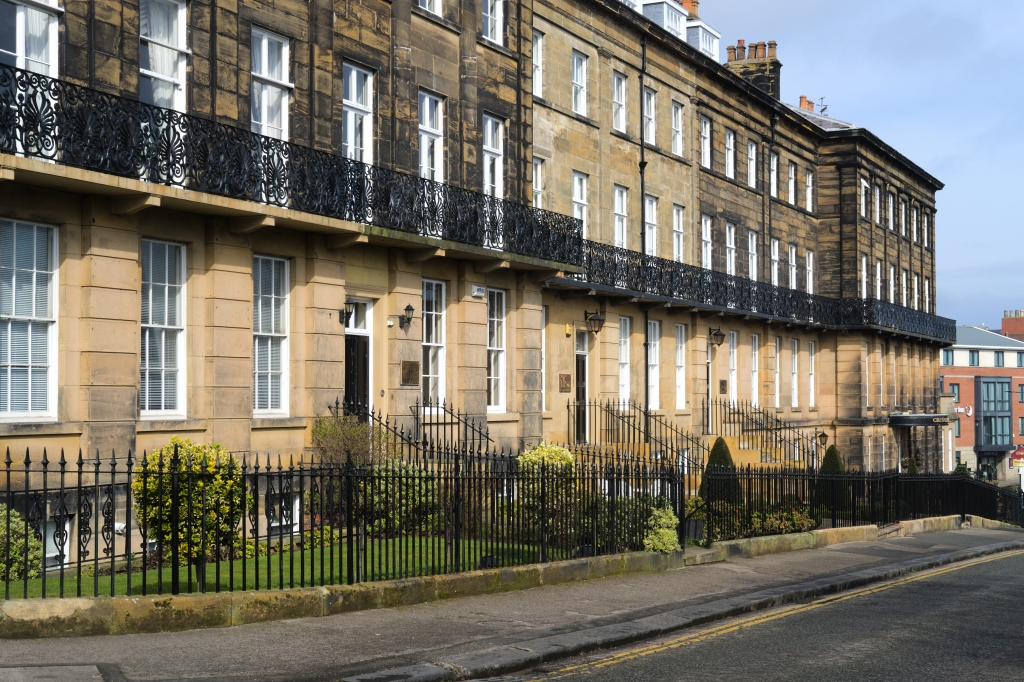
The terrace, in 2023

Belvoir Terrace is a historic building in Scarborough, North Yorkshire, in England.

The terrace of six houses was built between 1832 and 1833, to a design by R. H. and Samuel Sharp. It lies on the street named The Crescent, although the terrace itself is straight. There is a central garden area in front of the houses, which Historic England describes as a "major example of terrace architecture" in the town. From 1856 to 1857, a vicarage was constructed to the rear of 6 Belvoir Terrace. 1 Belvoir Terrace was later converted into the Crescent Hotel, with 22 bedrooms, while many of the other houses have been divided into flats. The terrace, including the former vicarage, has been grade II* listed since 1953.

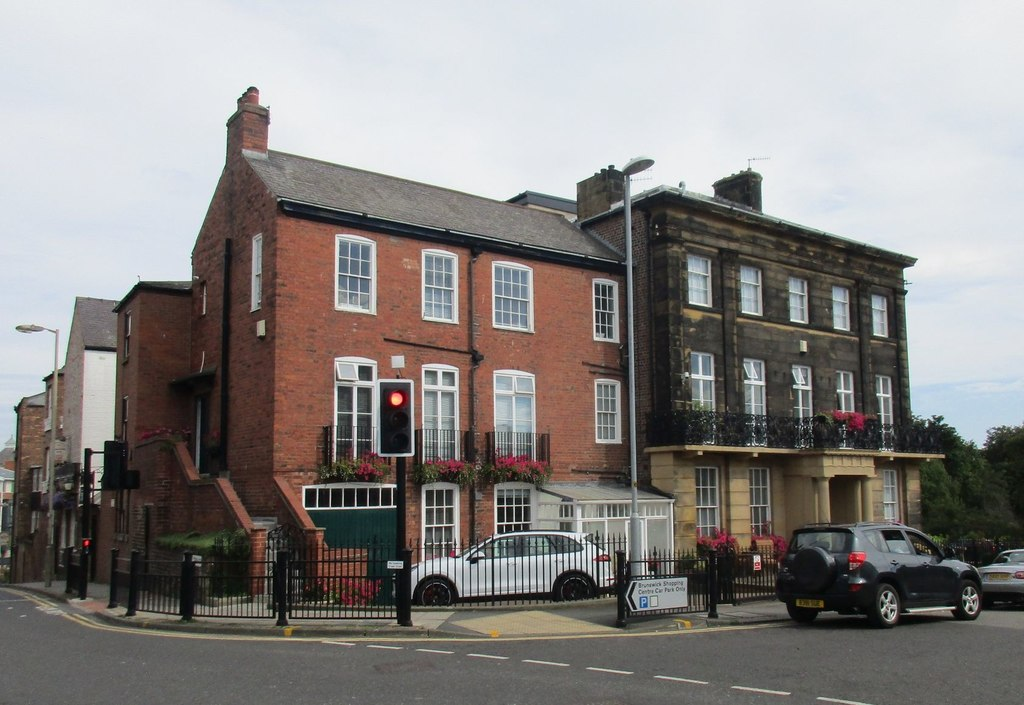
7 Belvoir Terrace

The terrace is built of stone, the ground floor with horizontal rustication, and has a hipped slate roof. Most of the houses have four storeys and three bays, and the six bays at each end project slightly. Steps with iron railings lead up to the doorways, which have architraves and oblong fanlights. Above the ground floor is a stone balcony with decorative cast iron railings. Between the houses on the upper two floors are pilasters and an entablature, and the middle floor contains French windows.

== See also ==
- Grade II* listed buildings in North Yorkshire (district)
- Listed buildings in Scarborough (Castle Ward)
