= Listed buildings in Hillam =

Hillam is a civil parish in the county of North Yorkshire, England. It contains ten listed buildings that are recorded in the National Heritage List for England. All the listed buildings are designated at Grade II, the lowest of the three grades, which is applied to "buildings of national importance and special interest". The parish contains the village of Hillam and the surrounding area. Apart from a milestone, all the listed buildings are in the village, and consist of houses, farmhouses and associated structures.

== Buildings ==
Name and location	Photograph	Date	Notes
Hall Farmhouse; 53.75361°N 1.22884°W		Early 17th century (probable)	The farmhouse is in rendered magnesian limestone with a stone slate roof. There are two storeys and three bays. On the front is a doorway, and horizontally-sliding sash windows, some of them tripartite. On the right return is a massive projecting chimney stack.
Cowshed and Granary, Hall Farm; 53.75344°N 1.22864°W	—	Early 17th century	The cowshed and granary are in magnesian limestone with quoins and a pantile roof. There are two storeys and four bays. On the front are doorways and windows, one with a chamfered surround, and in the centre, steps lead up to the granary entrance. In the right gable end are pigeon holes.
Threshing barn, Hall Farm; 53.75335°N 1.22886°W	—	Early 17th century (probable)	The barn is in magnesian limestone with an asbestos roof. There are two storeys and four bays, and flanking single-storey outshuts. On the front are three entrances, above are two pitching doors and blocked openings, and vents.
Stable, Hall Farm; 53.75329°N 1.22862°W		Early 17th century (probable)	A stable and hayloft in magnesian limestone, with a pantile roof and stone slate gable coping. There are two storeys and three bays. On the front is a central doorway, windows and vents, and in the gable end is a pitching door.
Burton Cottage and Chantries Cottage; 53.75358°N 1.22865°W		17th century	A house, later divided into two, in magnesian limestone, rendered on the front, the roofs with stone coping and kneelers. There are two storeys and six bays. On the front are two doorways with chamfered jambs and four-centred arched heads, and a mix of sash and casement windows. Elsewhere, there are mullioned windows, some with hood moulds.
Milestone; 53.75586°N 1.25259°W		18th century	The milestone on the east side of the A162 road has a diamond-shaped plan and a rounded head. On the north side is inscribed "LON / 180 / FER / 3" and on the south side "YORK / 18 / TAD 9".
Former carthouse and stables, Hillam Hall; 53.75264°N 1.22728°W		Early 19th century (probable)	The carthouse and stables, later used for other purposes, are in magnesian limestone, with a stone slate roof. There is a single storey, five bays, a later garage to the left, and an open three-bay cartshed to the right. In the centre are stable doors under flat heads.
Stable Block, Hillam Hall; 53.75265°N 1.22760°W		Early 19th century	A coach house and stables, incorporating a dovecote, later converted for residential use. It is in magnesian limestone with a stone coped stone slate roof. The central bay has two storeys and is flanked by lower two-storey five-bay wings containing casement windows and French windows. In the centre is a four-centred arched carriage entrance, over which is a stepped four-light window with a sill on consoles, and on the roof is an octagonal cupola and a weathervane.
Hillam Hall and West House; 53.75317°N 1.22751°W		1827	A house later divided into two, it is stuccoed, and has a coped stone slate roof with kneelers and finials. There is an H-shaped plan, the central range with four bays, a tall single storey on the left and two storeys on the right, and flanking gabled two-storey single-bay wings. On the front is an embattled porch, and a doorway with a four-centred arched head. The windows are mullioned or mullioned and transomed, some with hood moulds. In the gables are dated and inscribed shields.
Summerhouse, Millstone Lodge; 53.75319°N 1.22593°W		Early to mid 19th century	The summerhouse is in sandstone with a corrugated iron roof, and is in Gothic style. There is a single storey, a square plan, and a single bay. On the angles are buttresses with pinnacles, and on the front is a doorway with a pointed moulded head, colonnettes, and a hood mould. Above this is an embattled gable containing an incised cross and with a pinnacle. On the sides are lancet windows.
