= Prebendal House =

House in North Yorkshire, England

Coordinates: 53°45′41″N 1°14′07″W

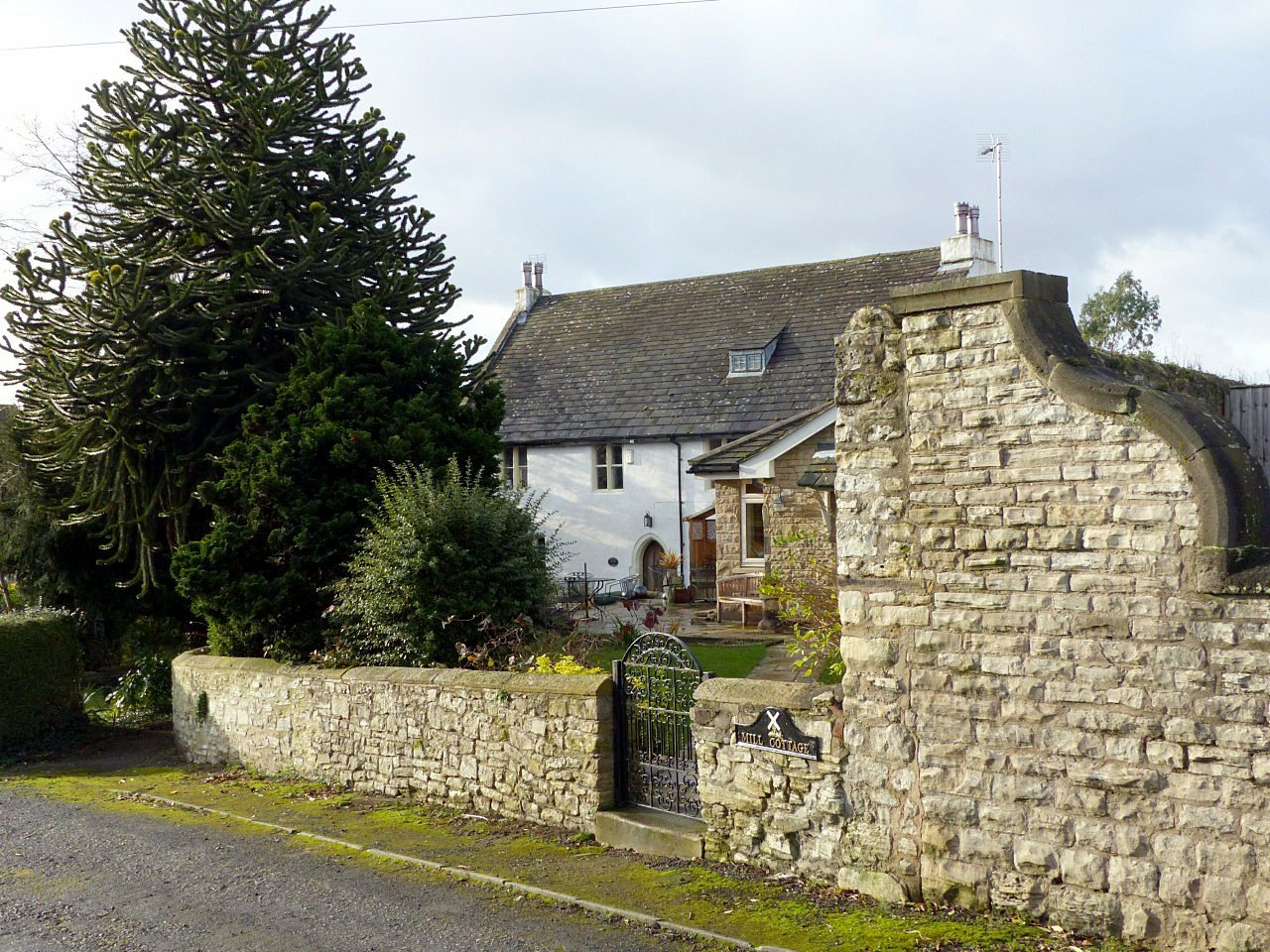
The building, in 2019

Prebendal House is a historic building in Monk Fryston, a village in North Yorkshire, in England.

The building was constructed in about 1425, and it has been extensively altered over the centuries. It was grade II* listed in 1967. It is built of roughcast magnesian limestone with a roof of stone slate, and pantile at the rear, with stone kneelers and copings. It has two storeys and three bays. The central doorway is pointed and has a double-chamfered surround. The windows are mullioned and transomed, and above is a raking dormer with a horizontally-sliding sash window. Inside, there is some 19th-century panelling, and a crown post roof.

== See also ==
- Grade II* listed buildings in North Yorkshire (district)
- Listed buildings in Monk Fryston
