= Monk Fryston Methodist Church =

Church building in Monk Fryston, North Yorkshire, England

Coordinates: 53°45′40″N 1°13′57″W

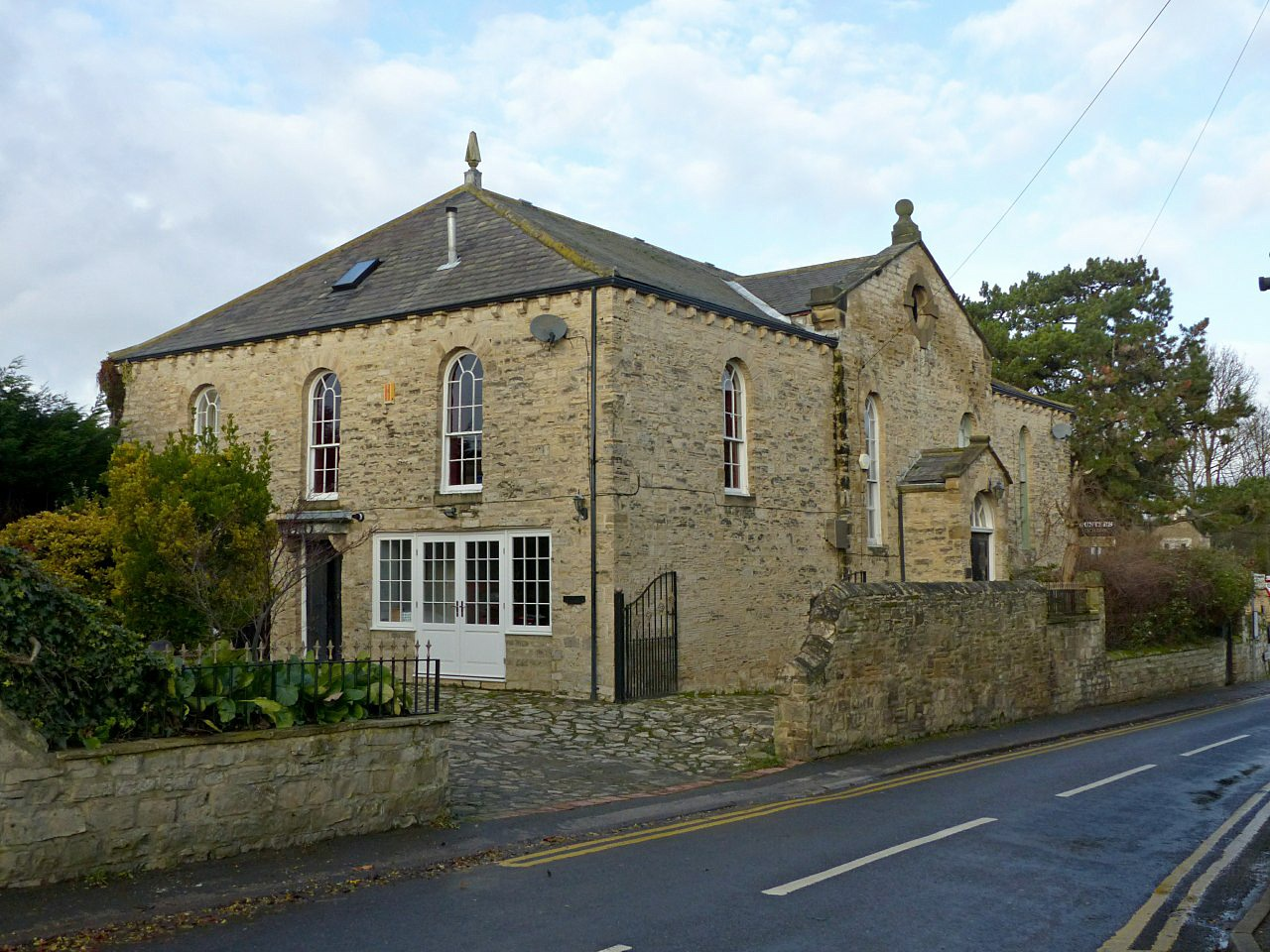
The building, in 2019

Monk Fryston Methodist Church is a historic building in Monk Fryston, a village in North Yorkshire, in England.

The church was constructed in 1845, for the Wesleyan Methodist Church, with a hexagonal plan. It originally had a capacity of 236 worshippers, and 160 pupils in the schoolroom underneath. As of 1851, the church had an average of 265 worshippers across three services each Sunday. It was extended in 1875, with wings added on both sides, the space including a new schoolroom. In 1986, the building was grade II listed. Early in the 21st century, it was converted into two houses.

The church is built of magnesian limestone on a plinth, with quoins, a modillion eaves band and a Welsh slate roof. There is a single tall storey, and a two-bay pedimented centre with single-bay flanking wings. In the centre is a pedimented porch with a round-arched doorway and a radial fanlight. It is flanked by narrow round-arched sash windows with keystones, and above is an oculus with keystones, and a ball finial on the apex. The wings contain round-headed sash windows.

== See also ==
- Listed buildings in Monk Fryston
