= St Wilfrid's Church, Monk Fryston =

Church in Monk Fryston, North Yorkshire, England

Coordinates: 53°45′42″N 1°14′06″W

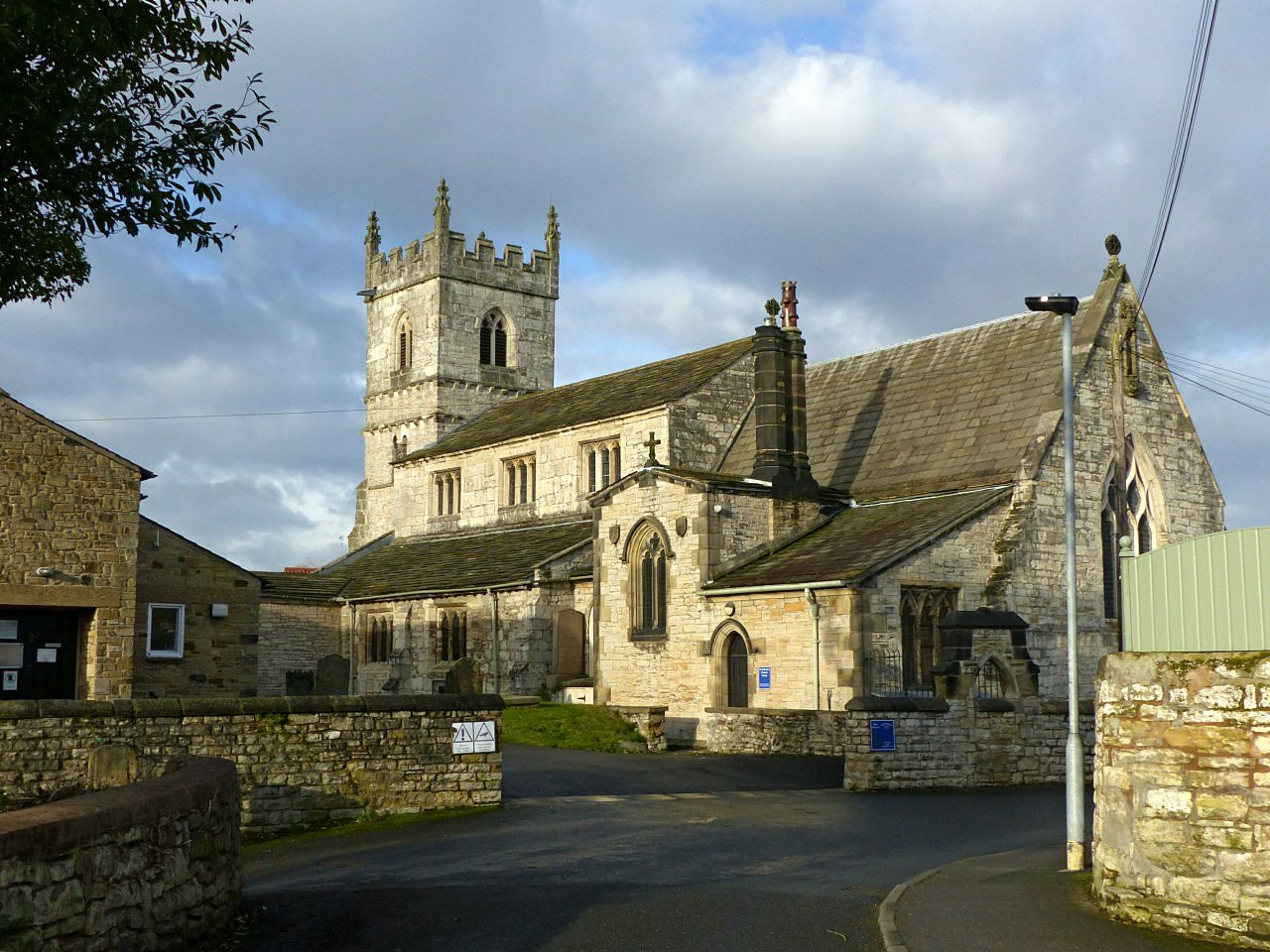
The church, in 2019

St Wilfrid's Church is the parish church of Monk Fryston, a village in North Yorkshire, in England.

The church was built in the Saxon period, probably in the early 11th century, from which era the lower part of the tower survives. The rest of the church was rebuilt in the 13th century, while the upper part of the tower dates from the 14th century, as does the clerestory. The choir was restored by Thomas Edmunds in 1685. The whole church was restored from 1889 to 1891 by Robert J. Johnson at a cost of £7,000. The work included the addition of a vestry, and the replacement of most of the stained glass. The building was grade I listed in 1967. In the mediaeval period, the church was dedicated to Mary, mother of Jesus, but it is now dedicated to Saint Wilfrid. In 1970, a church hall was added, to a design by George Pace and Ronald Sims. The church roof was replaced in 2013.

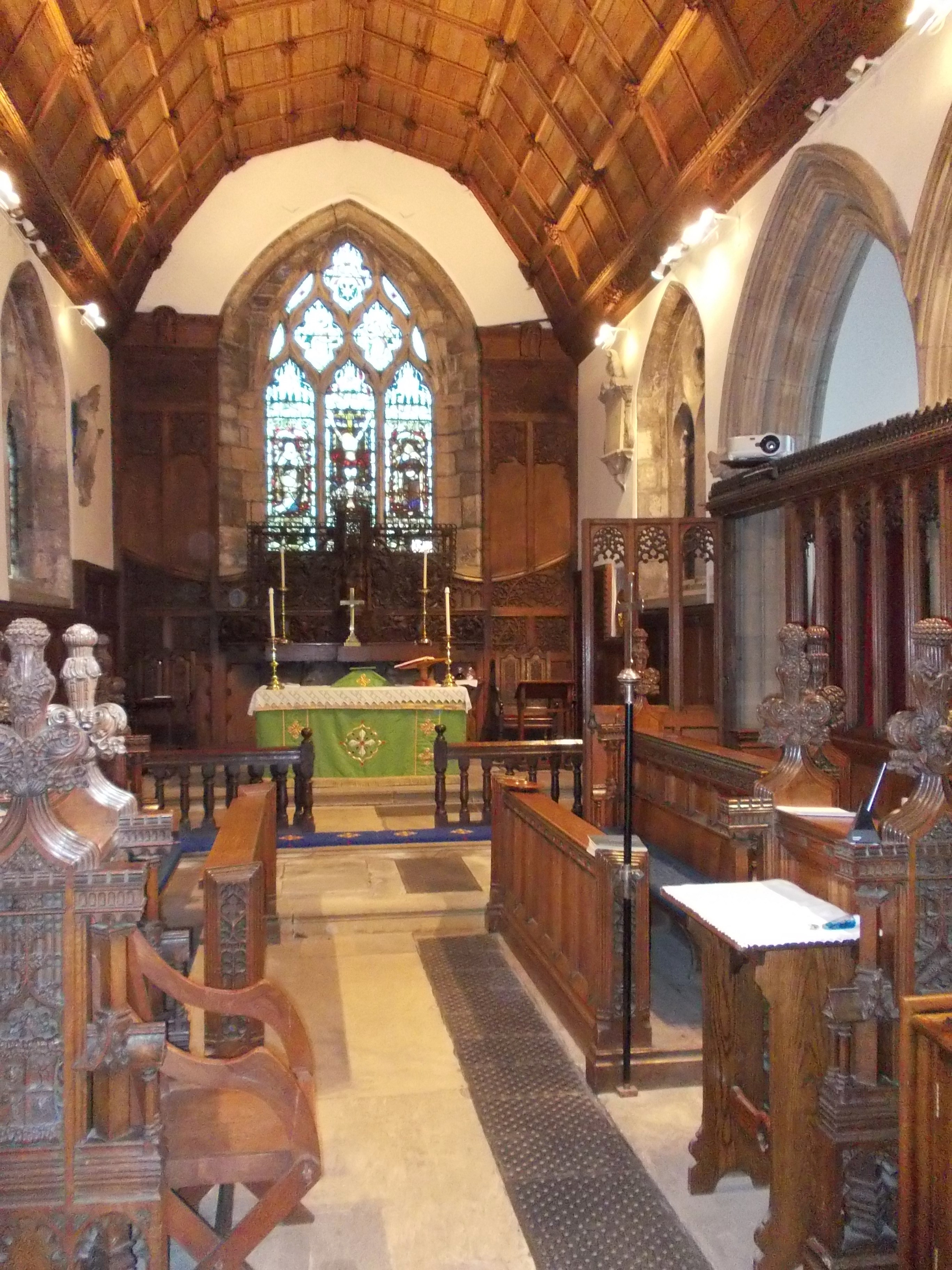
The chancel

The church is built of magnesian limestone, with roofs of stone slate and lead, and consists of a nave with a clerestory, north and south aisles, a south porch, a chancel with a south vestry, and a west tower. The tower has three stages, diagonal buttresses, a two-light west window, a floor band, two corbel tables, two-light round-headed bell openings, and an embattled parapet with crocketed pinnacles. The north aisle is also embattled, and at the east end is a three-light straight-headed Perpendicular window. Inside, there is a piscina, two 17th-century wall tablets, a 13th-century square stone font with a wooden cover dating from 1669, a communion rail from 1664, and several stained glass windows designed by Charles Eamer Kempe.

== See also ==
- Grade I listed buildings in North Yorkshire (district)
- Listed buildings in Monk Fryston
