= Hillam Hall =

House in Hillam, North Yorkshire, England

Coordinates: 53°45′11″N 1°13′39″W

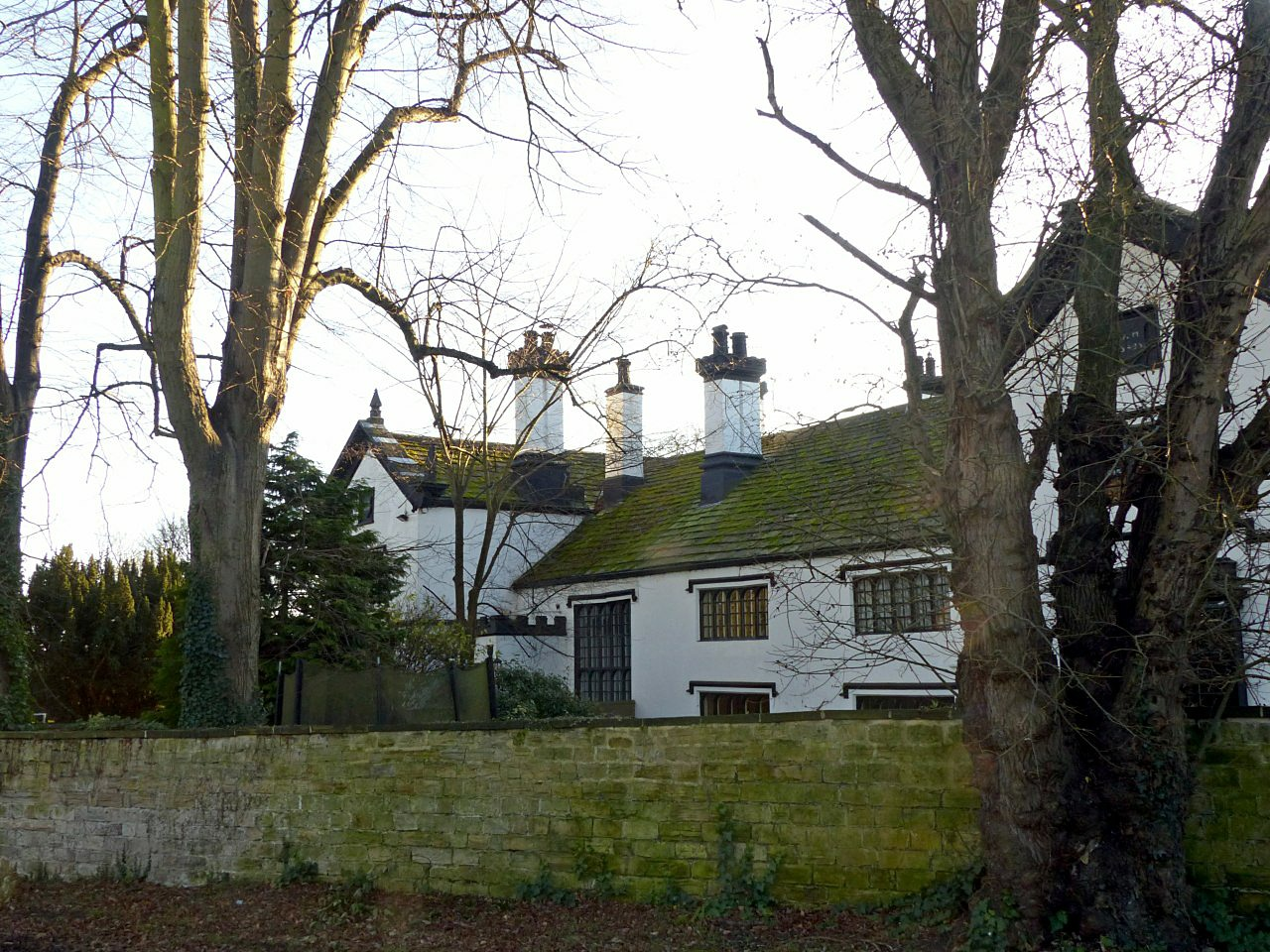
The building, in 2019

Hillam Hall is a historic building in Hillam, a village in North Yorkshire, in England.

The house was originally built for the Mouncey family, probably in the 17th century. Between 1827 and 1835 it was remodelled, in the Elizabethan Revival style. It was later divided into two houses, named Hillam Hall and West House. It was grade II listed in 1967.

The house is stuccoed, and has a coped stone slate roof with kneelers and finials. There is an H-shaped plan, the central range with four bays, a tall single storey on the left and two storeys on the right, and flanking gabled two-storey single-bay wings. On the front is an embattled porch, and a doorway with a four-centred arched head. The windows are mullioned or mullioned and transomed, some with hood moulds. In the gables are dated and inscribed shields. Inside, there is a large staircase, and a panelled room.

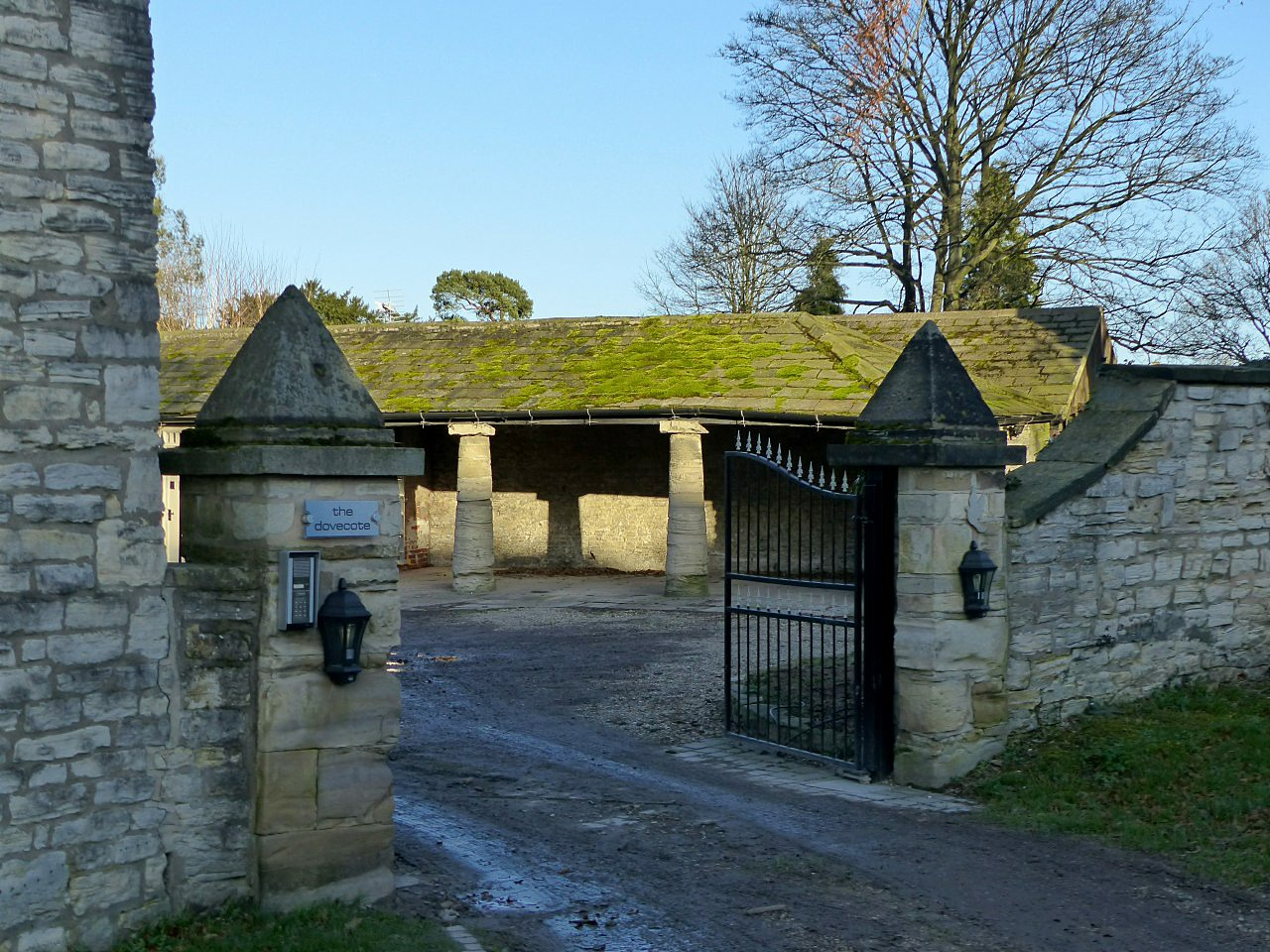
The carthouse and stables

The grade II-listed former carthouse and stables are built of magnesian limestone, with a stone slate roof. There is a single storey, five bays, a later garage to the left, and an open three-bay cartshed to the right. In the centre are stable doors under flat heads. The former coachhouse, dovecote and stable block, now a house, is also grade II-listed. It is built of limestone with a stone coped stone slate roof. The central bay has two storeys and is flanked by lower two-storey five-bay wings containing casement windows and French windows. In the centre is a four-centred arched carriage entrance, over which is a stepped four-light window with a sill on consoles, and on the roof is an octagonal cupola and a weathervane.

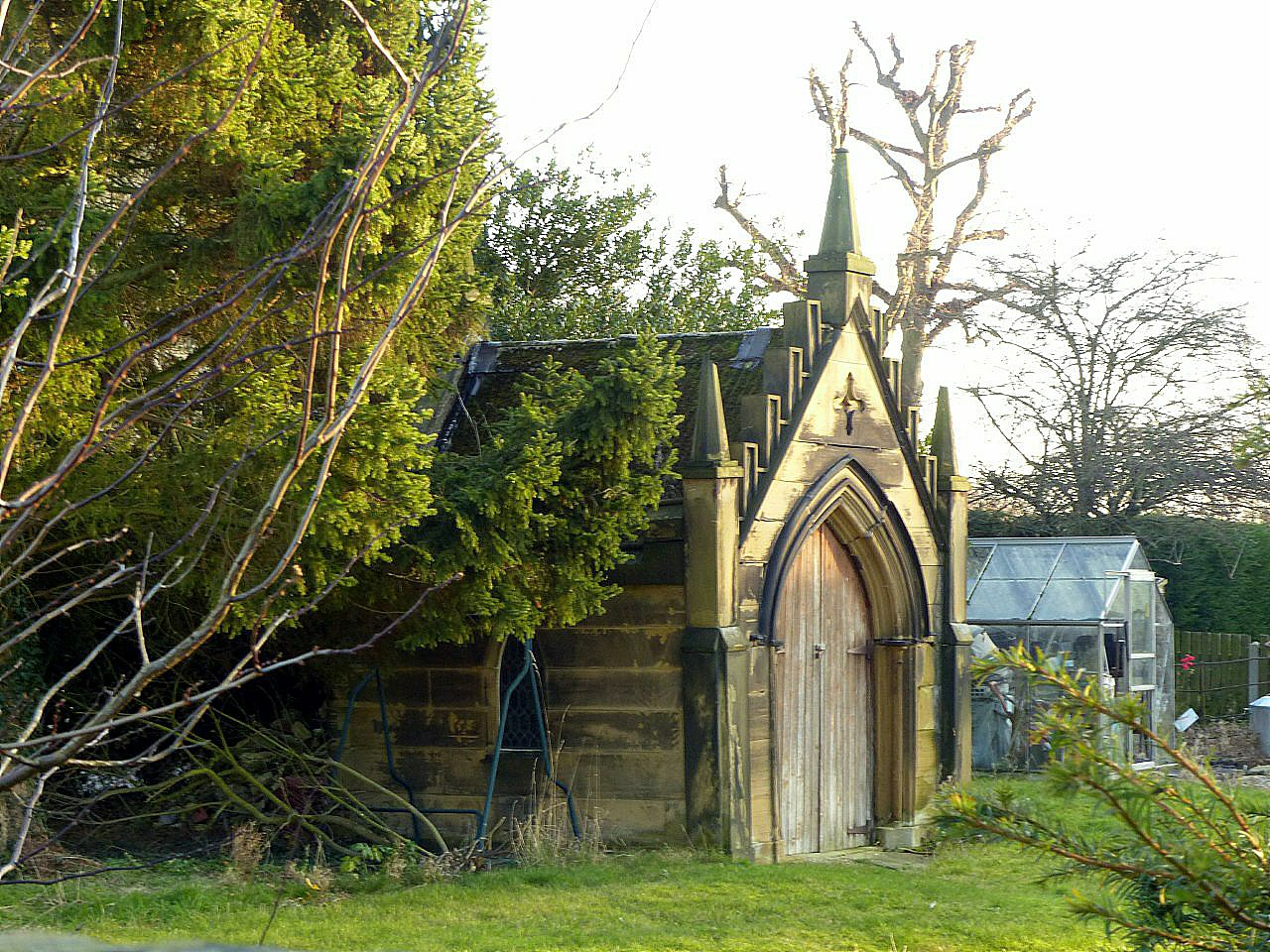
The summerhouse

In the garden is a grade II-listed summerhouse. It is built of sandstone with a corrugated iron roof, and is in Gothic style. There is a single storey, a square plan, and a single bay. On the angles are buttresses with pinnacles, and on the front is a doorway with a pointed moulded head, colonnettes, and a hood mould. Above this is an embattled gable containing an incised cross and with a pinnacle. On the sides are lancet windows. It is described by Nikolaus Pevsner as "like a tiny Gothic chapel".

== See also ==
- Listed buildings in Hillam
