= Listed buildings in Monk Fryston =

Monk Fryston is a civil parish in the county of North Yorkshire, England. It contains 15 listed buildings that are recorded in the National Heritage List for England. Of these, one is listed at Grade I, the highest of the three grades, two are at Grade II*, the middle grade, and the others are at Grade II, the lowest grade. The parish contains the village of Monk Fryson and the surrounding countryside. The listed buildings consist of houses and associated structures, a farmhouse and farm buildings, two churches and two milestones.

== Key ==
Grade	Criteria
I	Buildings of exceptional interest, sometimes considered to be internationally important
II*	Particularly important buildings of more than special interest
II	Buildings of national importance and special interest

== Buildings ==
Name and location	Photograph	Date	Notes	Grade
St Wilfrid's Church; 53.76164°N 1.23511°W		Anglo-Saxon	The church has been altered and extended through the centuries, and was restored in 1889–91. It is built in magnesian limestone, with roofs of stone slate and lead, and consists of a nave with a clerestory, north and south aisles, a south porch, a chancel with a south vestry, and a west tower. The tower has three stages, diagonal buttresses, a two-light west window, a floor band, two corbel tables, two-light round-headed bell openings, and an embattled parapet with crocketed pinnacles. The north aisle is also embattled, and at the east end is a three-light straight-headed Perpendicular window.	I
Monk Fryston Hall; 53.76257°N 1.23366°W		13th century	A country house that has been altered and extended through the centuries, and later converted into a hotel. It is in magnesian limestone with a stone slate roof, the gables with stone copings and kneelers. There are two storeys and attics and an L-shaped plan. Most of the windows are mullioned or mullioned and transomed with hood moulds. The doorway has a four-centred arched head.	II*
Prebendal House; 53.76128°N 1.23534°W		c. 1425	The house, which has been much altered, is in roughcast magnesian limestone with a roof of stone slate, and pantile at the rear, with stone kneelers and copings. There are two storeys and three bays. The central doorway is pointed and has a double-chamfered surround. The windows are mullioned and transomed, and above is a raking dormer with a horizontally-sliding sash window.	II*
The Manor House; 53.76154°N 1.23367°W		1655	The house is in magnesian limestone, with quoins, and a Cumberland slate roof with stone coping, There are two storeys and an attic, and six bays. On the front are two doorways with chamfered jambs, the left with a plain architrave and a hood, and the right with a four-centred arch. The windows are mullioned with hood moulds.	II
Stone House Farmhouse; 53.76208°N 1.23607°W		Late 17th century (probable)	The farmhouse is in magnesian limestone, with a floor band, and a roof of stone slate and pantile, hipped on the left. There are two storeys and an L-shaped plan, with a front range of three bays. The doorway has a flat lintel, and most of the windows are mullioned.	II
Barn southwest of Stone House Farmhouse; 53.76195°N 1.23641°W	—	Late 17th century (probable)	The barn is in magnesian limestone with a pantile roof. There is an outshut to the left, an off-centre cart entrance, two pitching doors and slit vents.	II
Stables and hayloft south of Stone House Farmhouse; 53.76175°N 1.23632°W	—	Late 17th century (probable)	The building is in magnesian limestone, with a roof of pantile and stone slate with stone coping. There are two storeys and three bays. The building contains stable doors, casement windows, and there are external steps to an upper floor entrance.	II
Monk Fryston Lodge; 53.75816°N 1.25944°W	—	Mid to late 18th century	The house is in magnesian limestone on a plinth, with a floor band, a sill band, an eaves band, and a hipped Welsh slate roof. There are two storeys and five bays. In the centre is a Roman Doric portico with a frieze and a cornice, and a doorway with a fanlight. The flanking full height bays are canted, and the windows are sashes.	II
Lodges, walls and piers, Monk Fryston Lodge; 53.75940°N 1.25231°W		Mid to late 18th century	The entrance to the drive is flanked by a pair of magnesian limestone lodges, each with a hipped Welsh slate roof. They have a doorway with a pointed head in an arch with a pointed head, and a chamfered surround, and on the front, each lodge has a window with a pointed head. Flanking the lodges are quadrant walls ending in square rusticated piers.	II
Former Methodist Church; 53.76118°N 1.23248°W		1845	The church was extended in 1875 with the addition of a schoolroom, and it has since been converted into two houses. It is in magnesian limestone on a plinth, with quoins, a modillion eaves band and a Welsh slate roof. There is a single tall storey, and a two-bay pedimented centre with single-bay flanking wings. In the centre is a pedimented porch with a round-arched doorway and a radial fanlight. It is flanked by narrow round-arched sash windows with keystones, and above is an oculus with keystones, and a ball finial on the apex. The wings contain round-headed sash windows.	II
Malvern House; 53.76227°N 1.23639°W		Mid-19th century	The house is in magnesian limestone with a modillion eaves band and a Welsh slate roof. There are three storeys and four bays. The entrance has a trefoil head, the windows are mullioned with sashes, and all the openings have hood moulds.	II
Milestone near the junction with the A162 road 53.76179°N 1.24456°W		19th century	The milestone is on the south side of the A63 road. It is in stone with a cast iron front, and has a triangular plan and a rounded top. On the top is inscribed "SELBY AND LEEDS" and "TURNPIKE ROAD", on the left face is the distance to Leeds, and on the right face the distance to Selby.	II
Milestone near the junction with Lowfield Roadroad; 53.76435°N 1.19593°W		19th century	The milestone is on the south side of the A63 road. It is in stone with a cast iron front, and has a triangular plan and a rounded top. On the top is inscribed "SELBY AND LEEDS" and "TURNPIKE ROAD", on the left face is the distance to Leeds, and on the right face the distance to Selby.	II
Gates, gate piers, railings and wall, Monk Fryston Hall; 53.76173°N 1.23268°W		Mid to late 19th century	The entrance to the drive is flanked by two pairs of stone gate piers with a square section, about 4 metres (13 ft) tall. Each pier has a frieze, a cornice, and a pedestal, and the inner pair have lanterns. The gates are in cast iron, and have finials and scroll decoration. These are flanked by low rusticated sandstone walls with curved coping and cast iron railings.	II
Lodge, Monk Fryston Hall; 53.76179°N 1.23233°W		Mid to late 19th century	The lodge is in sandstone on a plinth, with magnesian limestone dressings, quoins, and a stone slate roof with stone copings, kneelers with vase finials, and the remains of an apex finial. There are two storeys and an L-shaped plan. In the angle is a porch with fluted pillars, a round arch with a keystone, a cornice and a low parapet. Each gable end contains a mullioned and transomed window, that on the left with a segmental arch and keystone, fluted pilasters, a cornice and a low parapet, and on the upper floor are mullioned windows.	II
