= Monk Fryston Hall =

House in Monk Fryston, North Yorkshire, England

Coordinates: 53.7625°N 1.2336°W

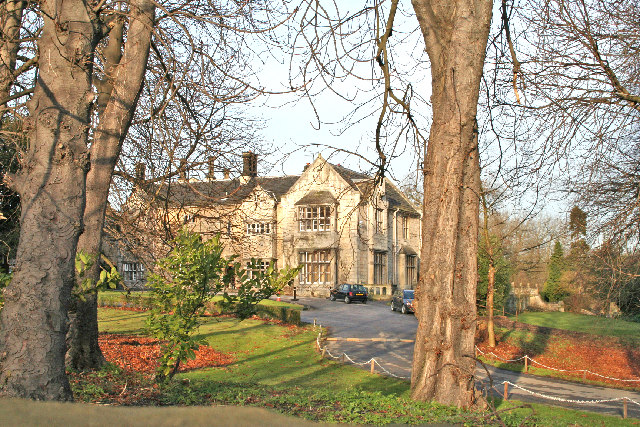
Monk Fryston Hall

Monk Fryston Hall is a Grade II* listed country house standing in 66 acres of parkland in Monk Fryston, Selby, North Yorkshire, England.

The hall was originally built for Selby Abbey in the 13th century in Magnesian Limestone with a stone slate roof. It was heavily restored c.1740, altered again in 1897 and an additional range added in the 20th century.

Monk Fryston was bought in 1680 by the Hemsworth family and the family occupied the hall for several generations. In 1946 it was sold to an S. W. Tinsdale who converted the hall to a hotel. In 1954 it was sold to the 10th Duke of Rutland. Two subsequent sales in 2005, and 2013 resulted in it being run as a hotel known as Monk Fryston Hall Hotel. This business went into administration on 16 September 2022 and was dissolved on 23 November 2024.

The property was bought by Tokyo Industries (Ultimate) Ltd in June 2023 with plans to renovate, and open as a functioning hotel and venue.

== See also ==
- Grade II* listed buildings in North Yorkshire (district)
- Listed buildings in Monk Fryston
