= Hillam =

Village and civil parish in North Yorkshire, England

Coordinates: 53°45′14″N 1°13′50″W

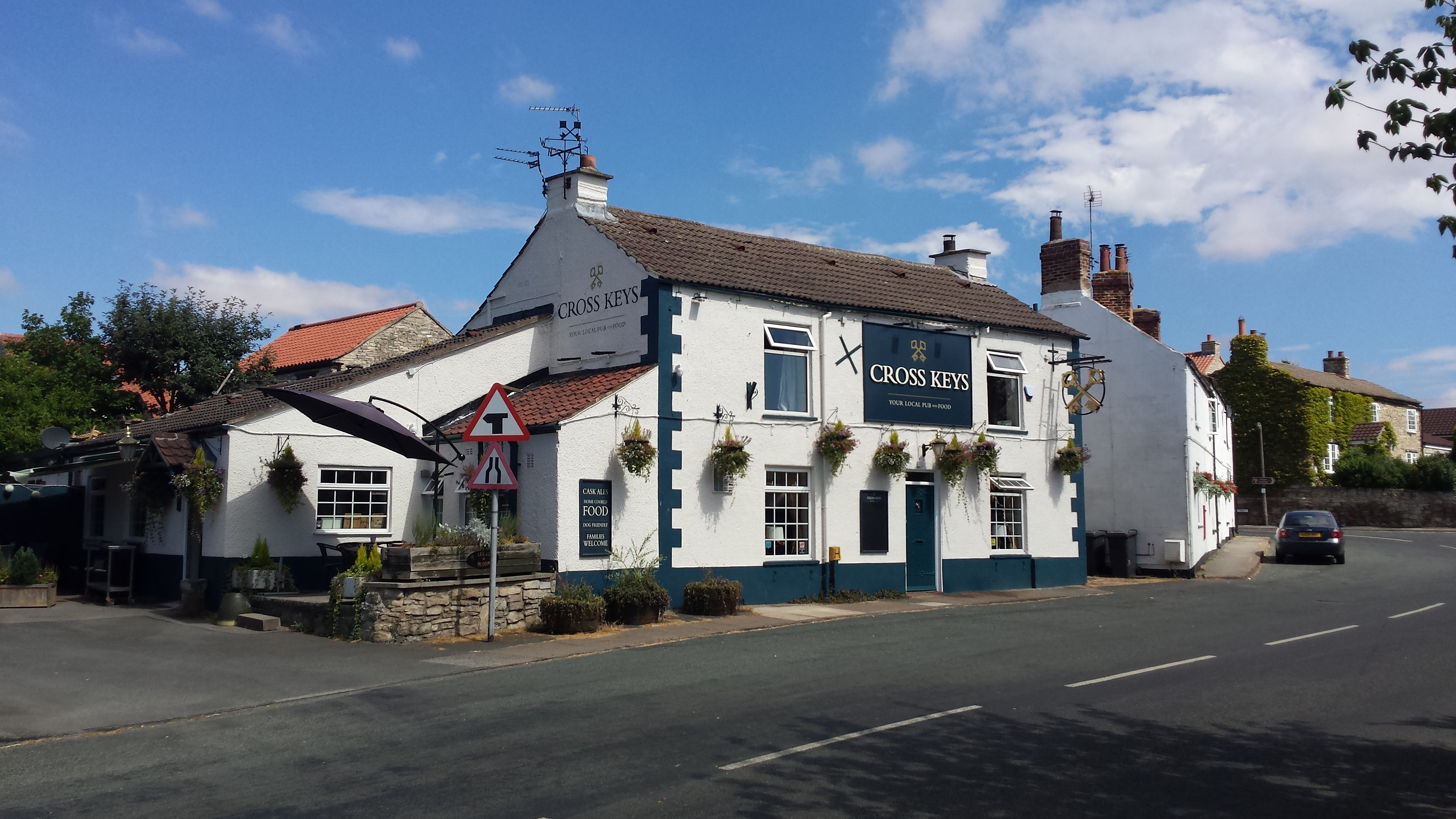
- Cross Keys Hillam

- Location within North Yorkshire
- OS grid reference: SE505285
- Civil parish: Hillam
- Unitary authority: North Yorkshire
- Ceremonial county: North Yorkshire
- Region: Yorkshire and the Humber
- Country: England
- Sovereign state: United Kingdom
- Post town: LEEDS
- Postcode district: LS25
- Police: North Yorkshire
- Fire: North Yorkshire
- Ambulance: Yorkshire

Hillam is a village and civil parish in the county of North Yorkshire, England.

The village is closely linked to Monk Fryston, although both villages maintain separate parish councils. According to the 2011 UK census the population of Hillam parish was 720 and the number of households was 277.

The village was historically part of the West Riding of Yorkshire until 1974. From 1974 to 2023 it was part of the Selby District, it is now administered by the unitary North Yorkshire Council.

== History ==
The oldest record which names the village is dated 963 AD. It records a grant of land in Sherburn-in-Elmet and nearby settlements by King Eadgar to Aelsac as a reward for goods and services. The land granted in Hillam is described as, "on Hillum tyesra oxena gang" meaning "in Hillam two oxgangs". An oxgang was related to the amount of land an ox could plough in a year and is roughly equated to 15 acres.

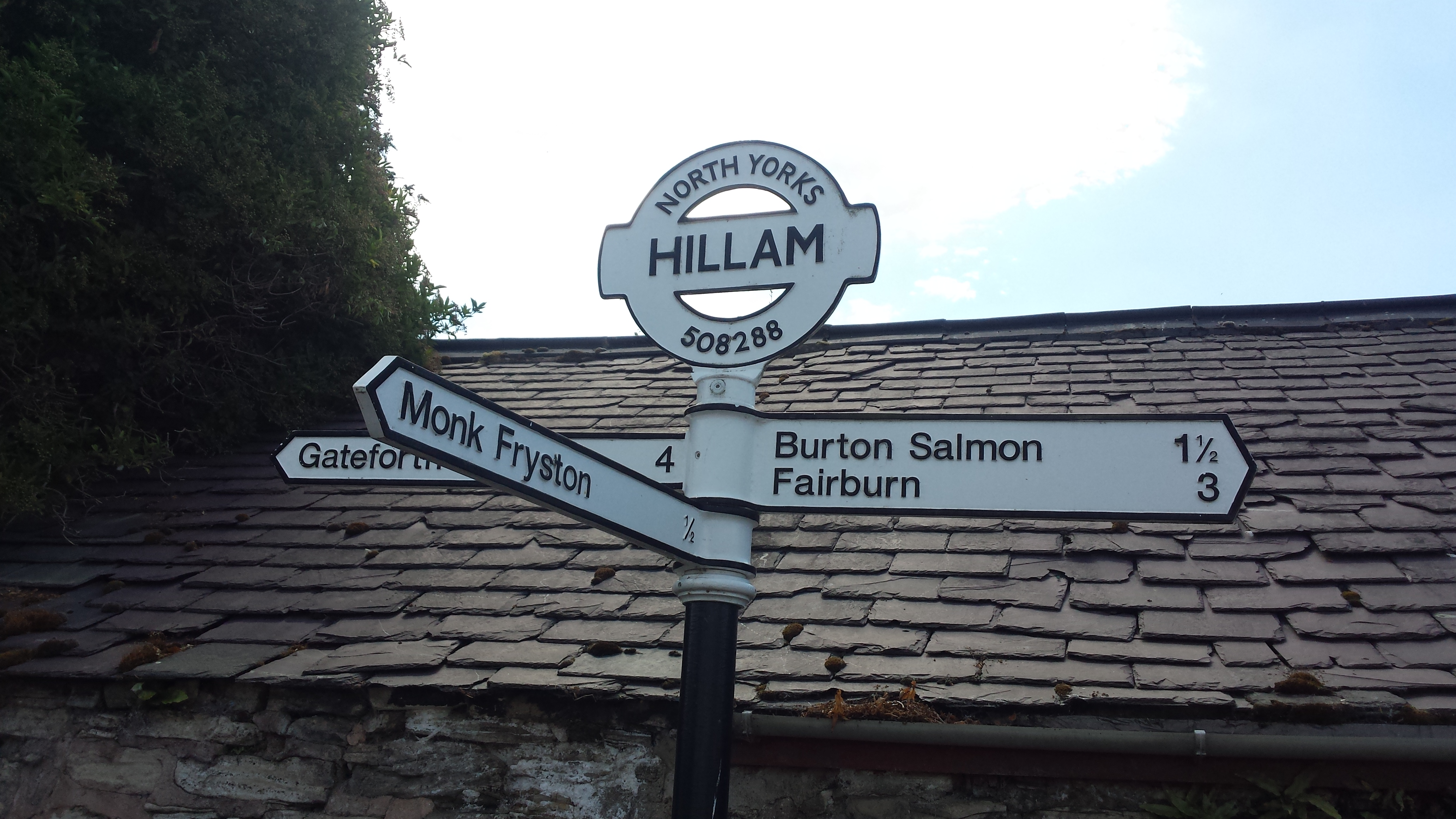
Hillam Square. Grid Ref SE508288

=== Heritage ===
The National Heritage List For England, compiled by English Heritage, lists ten Grade II listed buildings including Hillam Hall, and a milestone.

=== Village features ===
The village is served by a public house, the Cross Keys, winner of Leeds City Council Business in Bloom Gold award in 2007 and Yorkshire in Bloom Gold Award in 2007.

The Ring Tree is lit at Christmas and local children gather to enjoy a Christmas celebration each year. Due to disease the flowering horse-chestnut tree was felled in May 2016 and replaced with a whitebeam tree in November 2016. Hillam Historians restored the village pump in Hillam Square during 2006.

Hillam Square retains its red telephone box. In spring 2017 a defibrillator was installed.

== Transport ==
Hillam is situated just over 6 miles west of the market town of Selby. It lies 2 miles east of the A1(M) motorway junction 42, and 4 miles north of the M62 junction 33, at Ferrybridge. The A63 road, Leeds to Selby, runs parallel to the northern boundary of the parish.

The Dearne Valley Line passes to the west of Hillam. There is a level crossing known as Hillam Gates. The spot is popular with railway enthusiasts.

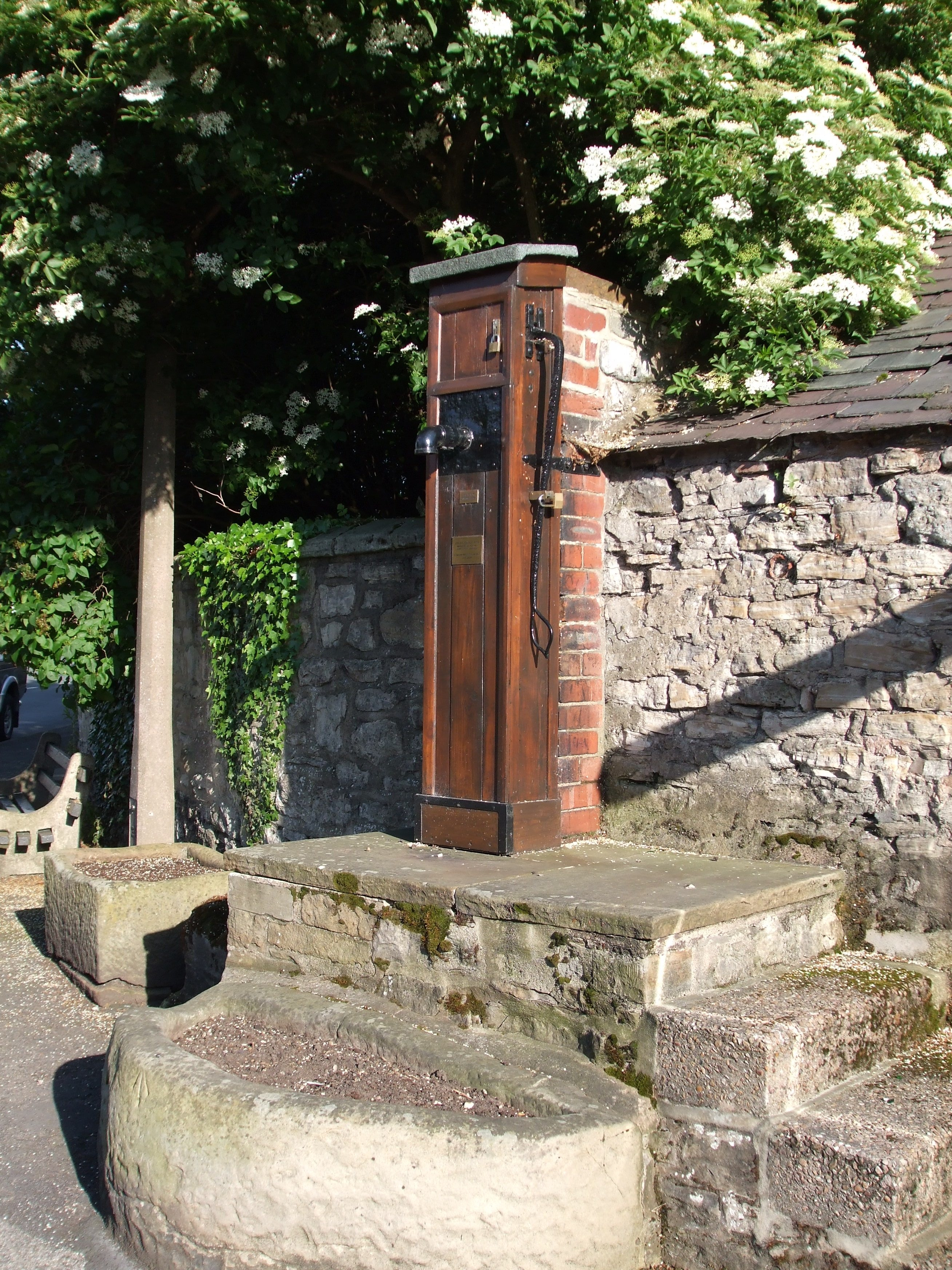
The pump in Hillam Square

== Community ==
Hillam News, the village magazine, is distributed to each household every two months. Hillam News gives details of recent and forthcoming events, news, comment, current affairs and a precis of Hillam Parish Council meeting minutes.

Community activities are supported by the Monk Fryston and Hillam Community Association. Cultural, educational and social community activities are held at the Community Centre and Village Children's Playground.

Primary education needs are served by Monk Fryston Church of England Voluntary Controlled Primary School. The school has 198 pupils between 4 and 11 years of age. The original primary school building still remains as housing whilst the new primary school is located on what was the school field.

The parish church is St Wilfrid's Church, Monk Fryston (Church of England).

=== Sport ===
Hillam has a successful cricket team which competes in the Yorkshire Premier League North Division Ebor 2 (1st XI) and Ebor 5 (2nd XI). Hillam and Monk Fryston Cricket Club's ground is noted for a tree at the boundary. Cricket has been played in Hillam over 100 years, and is very much a community activity, with all ages representing both teams. As of June 2024, there are three junior cricket teams, Under 9's, Under 11's, and Under 15's, alongside All-Stars for 5-8 year olds and Dynamos for 8-10 year olds. Next to the cricket field is Monk Fryston football club, which has teams for all ages.

Hillam Pond, known locally as the Brick Pond, is located to the west of the village. It holds a variety of coarse fish including carp, perch, common roach, eel, bream and tench.

=== Tour de Yorkshire ===
The 2016 Tour de Yorkshire passed through Hillam on Saturday 30 April 2016. The 135.5 km route between Otley and Doncaster was raced by both the men's and women's teams. The 2016 Women's Tour de Yorkshire raced through mid-morning and finally Stage 2 of the men's race swept through the village mid-afternoon.

== Gallery ==
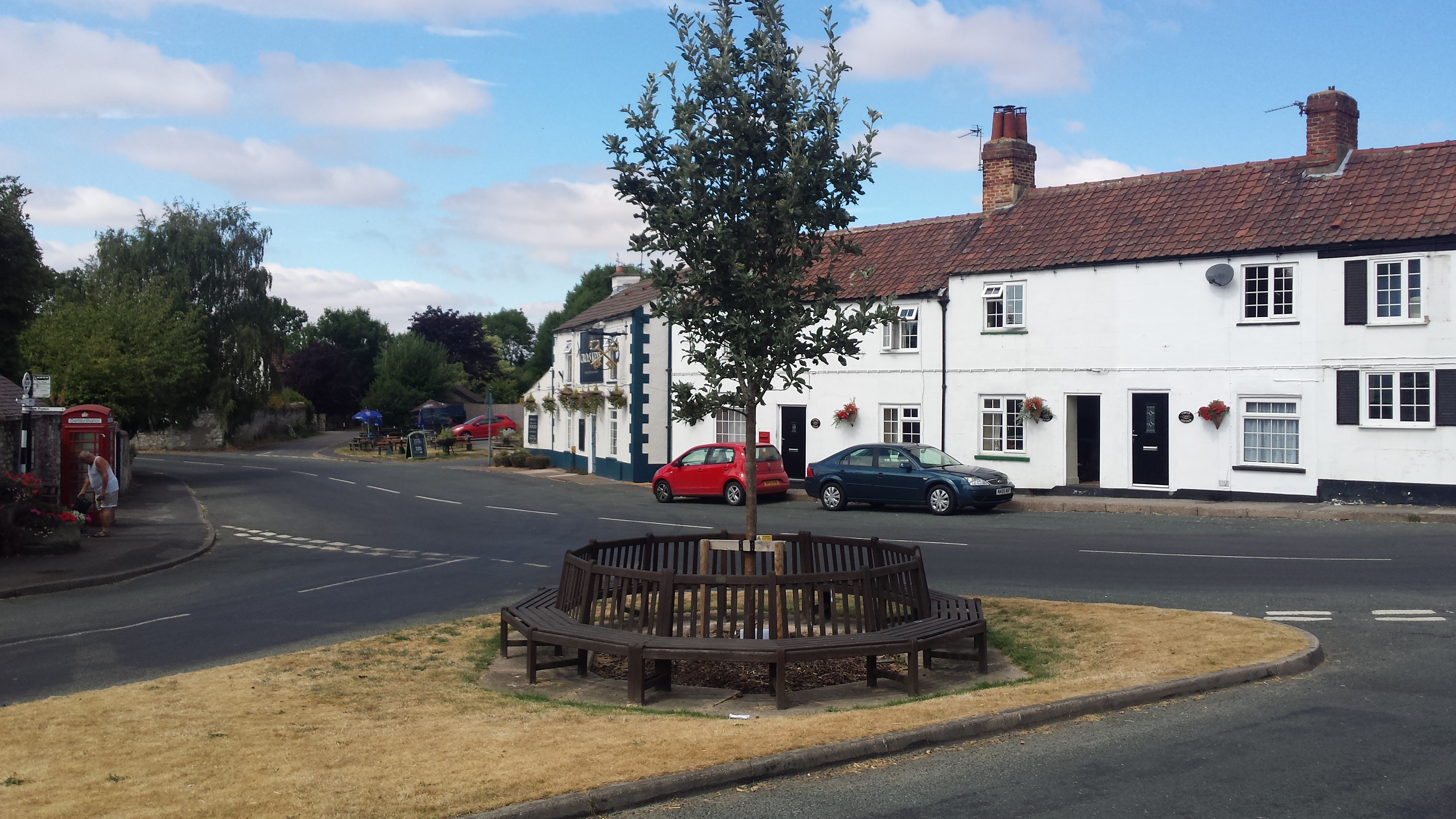
Hillam Square 2018

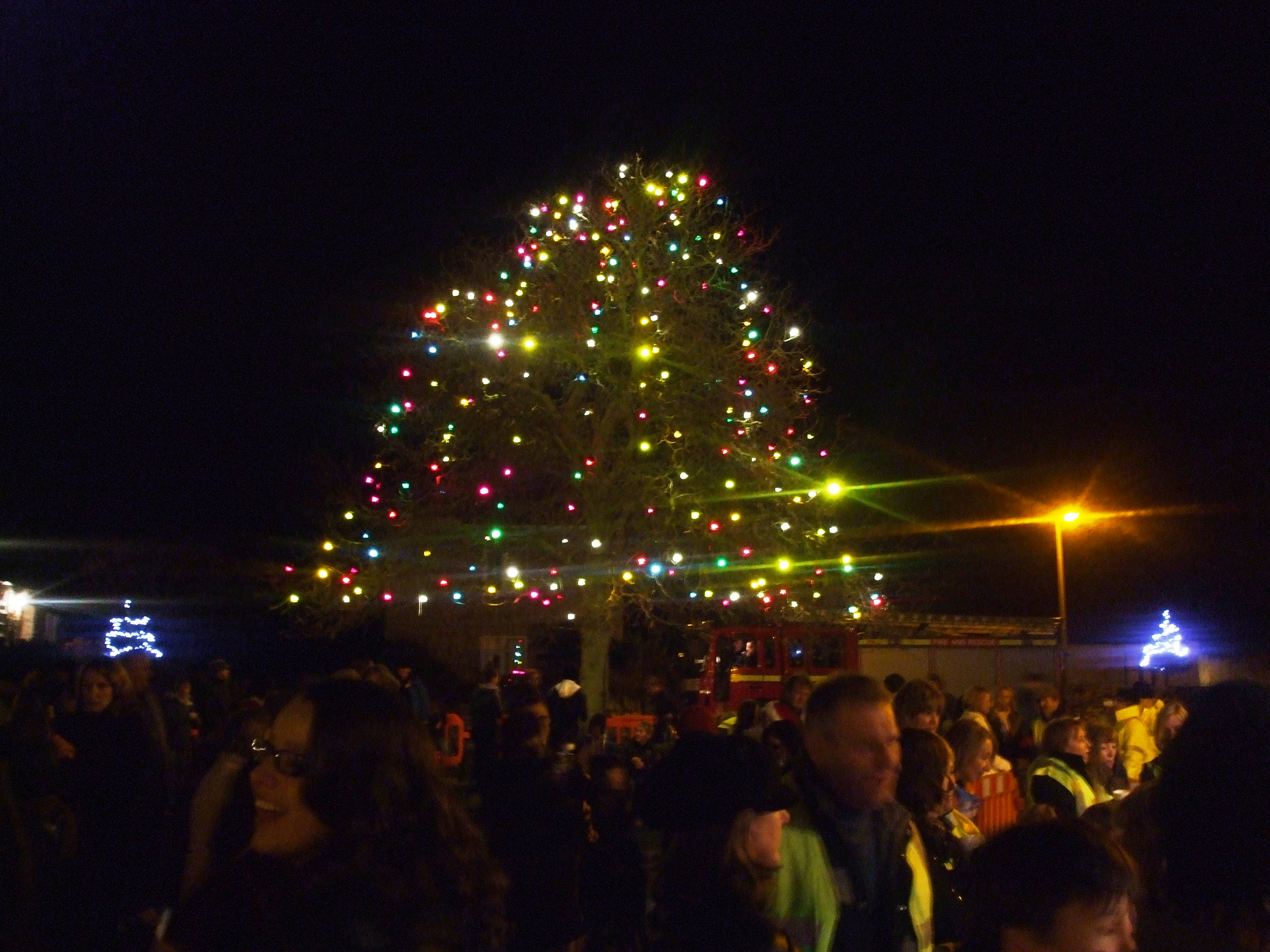
Hillam Lights 2009

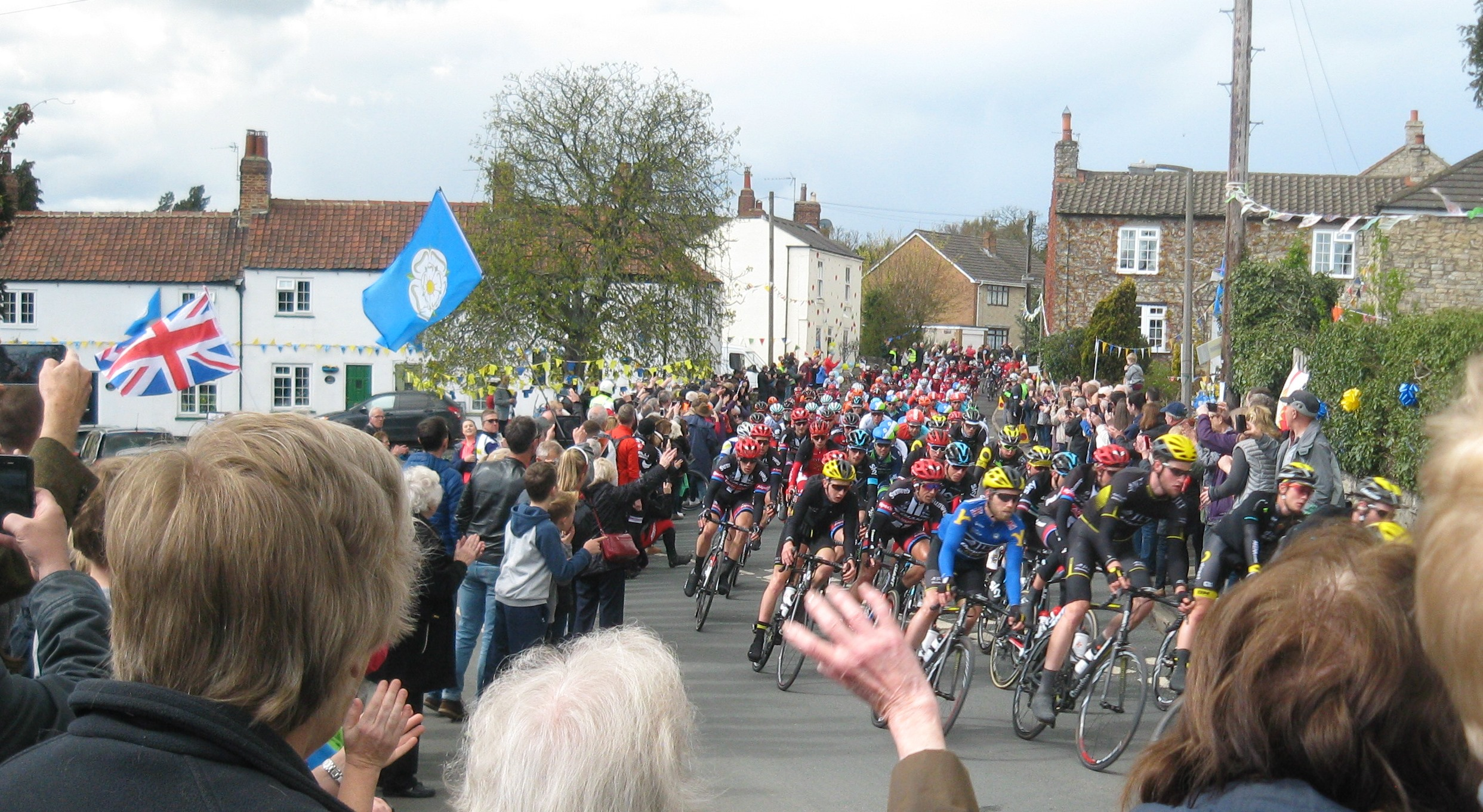
Tour de Yorkshire 2016

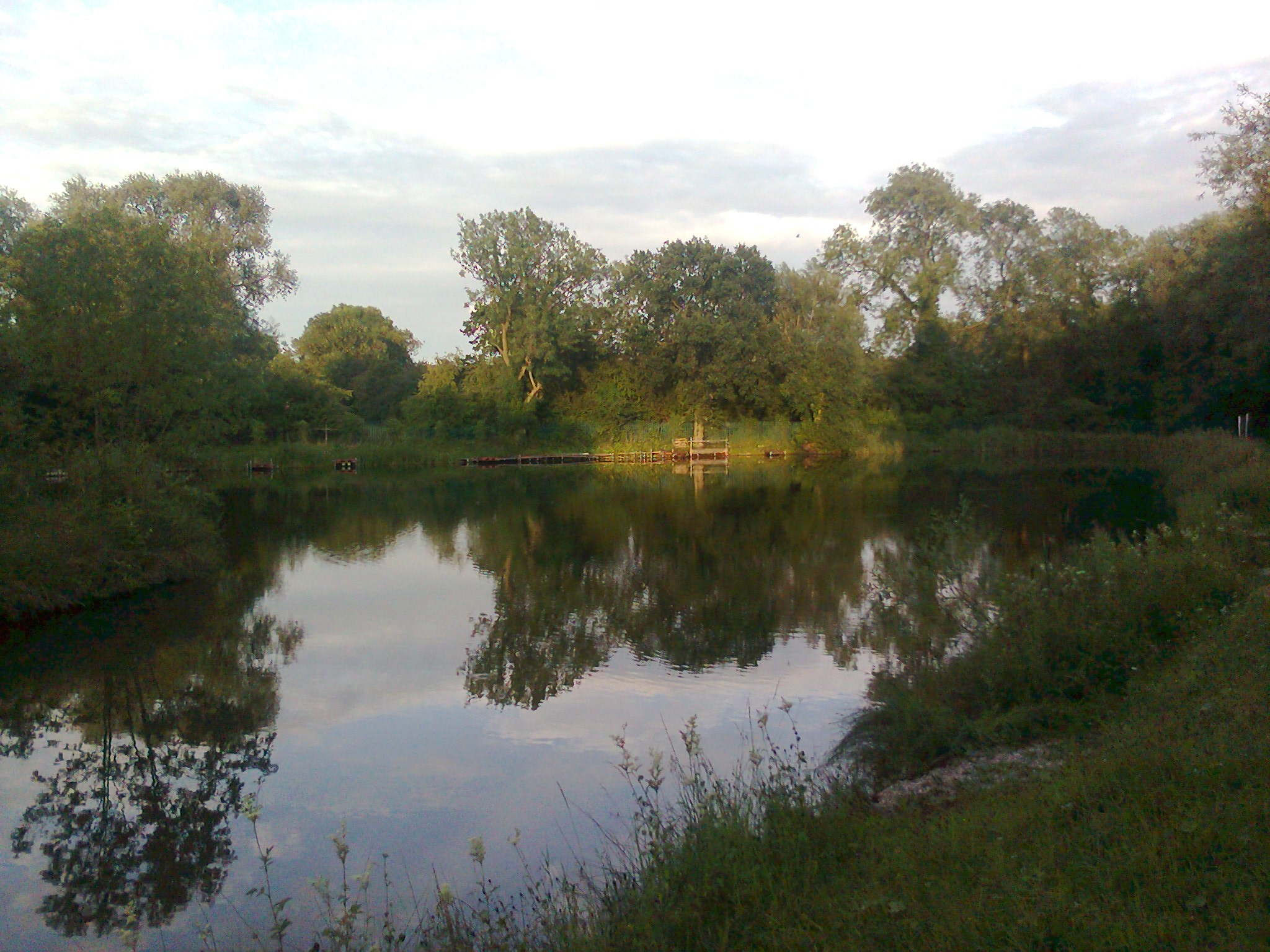
Hillam Pond
