= Monk Fryston =

Village and civil parish in North Yorkshire, England

Coordinates: 53°45′41″N 1°13′56″W

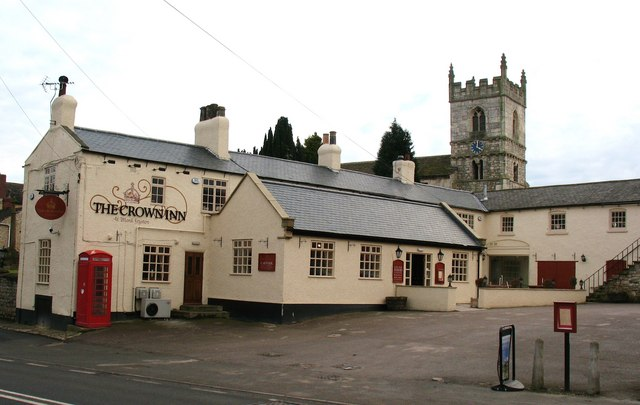
- Monk Fryston

- Location within North Yorkshire
- Population: 1,008 (2011 census)
- OS grid reference: SE505295
  - London: 160 mi (260 km) SSE
- Unitary authority: North Yorkshire
- Ceremonial county: North Yorkshire
- Region: Yorkshire and the Humber
- Country: England
- Sovereign state: United Kingdom
- Post town: LEEDS
- Postcode district: LS25
- Police: North Yorkshire
- Fire: North Yorkshire
- Ambulance: Yorkshire
- UK Parliament: Selby

Monk Fryston is a small village and civil parish in the county of North Yorkshire, England.

The village was historically part of the West Riding of Yorkshire until 1974. From 1974 to 2023 it was part of the Selby District, it is now administered by the unitary North Yorkshire Council.

== History and overview ==
The Dictionary of British Place Names notes Monk Fryston as "Fristun" (c. 1030) and "Munechesfryston" (1166). The name derives from the Old English for "farmstead of the frisians", with prefix 'Monk' relating to it being an 11th-century possession of Selby Abbey. According to a personal FreeUK web page, the name of the village originates from Monk's Free Stone, as all of the stone used to build Selby Abbey was obtained from a quarry in the centre of the village across the road from the old school building. The quarry was filled in for a housing development located next to the new school building, built on the old school field in 1998–99. The old school building has since been converted to housing.

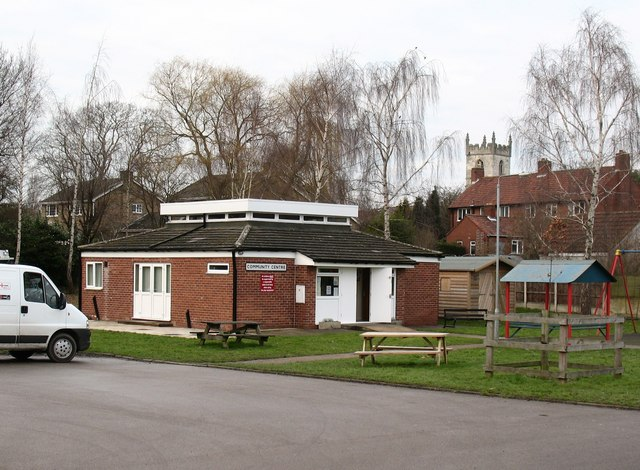
Monk Fryston Community Centre

The village is very closely linked to Hillam, although both villages maintain separate parish councils.

According to the 2011 UK census the population of Monk Fryston parish was 1,008 and the number of households was 406.

Monk Fryston is situated just over 6 miles (10 km) west of the town of Selby. It lies 2 miles (3 km) east of the A1(M) motorway junction 42, (A1 road), and 5 miles (8 km) north of the M62 motorway, junction 33, at Ferrybridge. The A63 road, Leeds to Selby, runs through the village.

Primary education needs are served by Monk Fryston Church of England Primary School.

St Wilfrid's Church, Monk Fryston is the Church of England parish church

The village has one public house, the Crown Inn, which dates back to the 1600s, and a hotel, the Monk Fryston Hall Hotel which dates back to the 12th century.

The National Heritage List for England, compiled by English Heritage, holds 15 listed buildings for Monk Fryston. The list includes the Grade I St Wilfrid's Church, the Grade II* Monk Fryston Hall and two Grade II milestones. The York and North Midland Railway passes to the west of Monk Fryston. An old station platform still exists next to the railway just down from Milford sidings. The spot is popular with railway enthusiasts.

=== Sports ===
Monk Fryston is the namesake for many sports around the village, including cricket and football. Despite this, the home games of the football and cricket teams are held in Stocking Lane, which is in Hillam.

== Governance ==
Monk Fryston is part of the Monk Fryston and South Milford electoral ward. This ward had a total population taken at the 2011 census of 4,096.

== See also ==
- Listed buildings in Monk Fryston
