= St John's Church, Bellerby =

Anglican church in North Yorkshire, England

Coordinates: 54.3302°N 1.8239°W

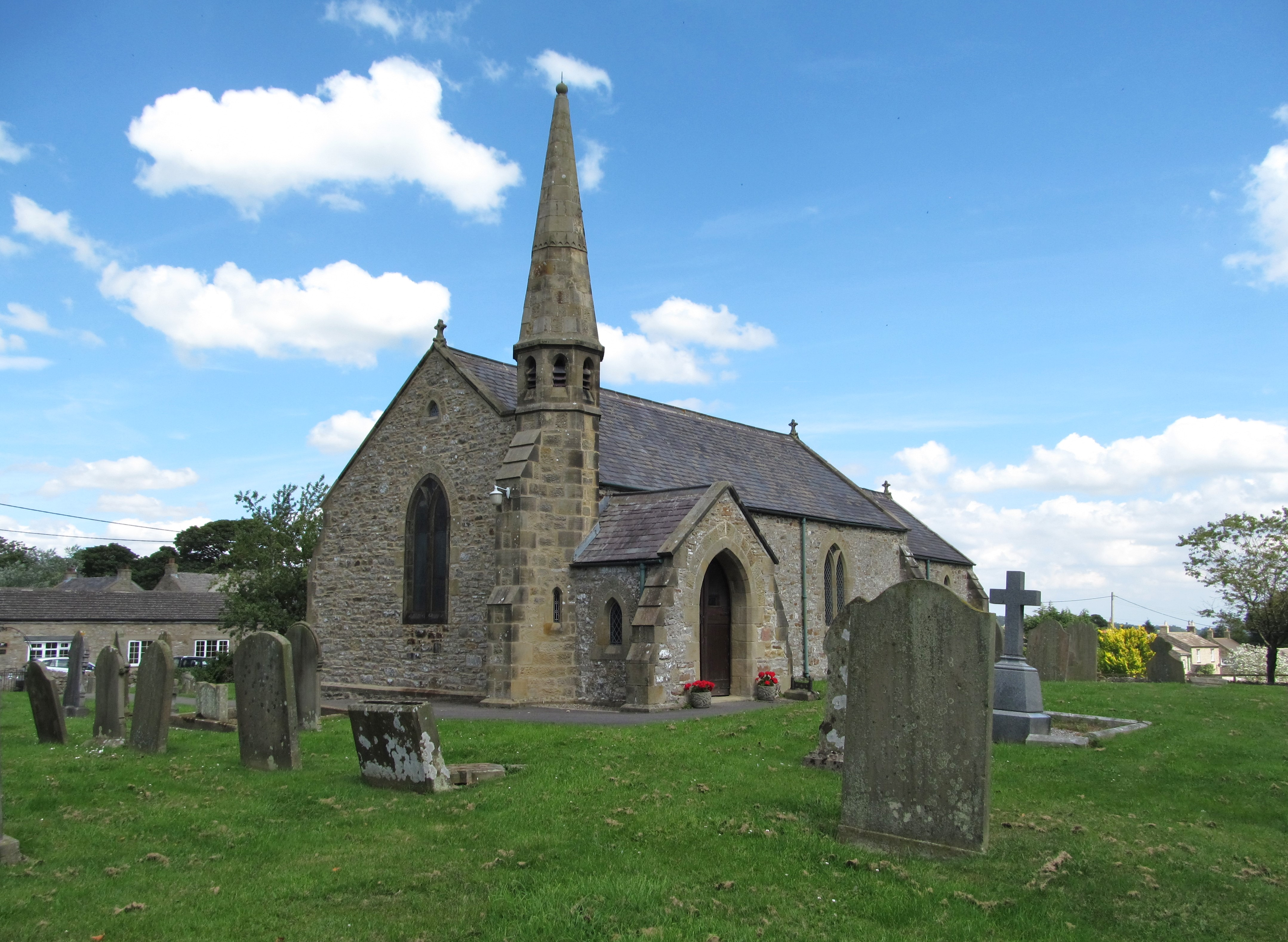
The church, in 2015

St John's Church is the parish church of Bellerby, a village in North Yorkshire, in England.

The first reference to a church in Bellerby is from the 15th century, and in 1474 it was the subject of a papal bull establishing the funding of a resident priest, who would say mass. It long served as a chapel-of-ease to St Michael's Church, Spennithorne. It was rebuilt in 1801, and again in 1874. In 1847, it was licensed for baptisms, marriages and burials. In 1967, the church was Grade II listed. The church was re-roofed and redecorated in 2005, with a carpet fitted the following year. The church bell was removed in 2017 as it was unsafe, but was rehung in 2021.

The church is built of stone with a Welsh slate roof. It consists of a three-bay nave with a south porch, a two-bay chancel with a north vestry, and a southwest steeple. The steeple is octagonal with string courses, louvred openings, and an octagonal spire. The porch is gabled and has buttresses, and a pointed doorway with a chamfered surround.

== See also ==
- Listed buildings in Bellerby
