= Listed buildings in Spennithorne =

Spennithorne is a civil parish in the county of North Yorkshire, England. It contains 14 listed buildings that are recorded in the National Heritage List for England. Of these, one is listed at Grade I, the highest of the three grades, and the others are at Grade II, the lowest grade. The parish contains the village of Spennithorne and the surrounding countryside. In the village are three remaining buildings from a medieval manorial complex, which are listed. The other listed buildings include a church and items in the churchyard, houses and associated structures, a farmhouse, and a school and school house.

== Key ==
Grade	Criteria
I	Buildings of exceptional interest, sometimes considered to be internationally important
II	Buildings of national importance and special interest

== Buildings ==
Name and location	Photograph	Date	Notes	Grade
St Michael's Church; 54.29619°N 1.79097°W		12th century	The church has been altered and extended through the centuries, including a restoration in 1872 by G. Fowler Jones. It is built in sandstone with Westmorland slate roofs, and consists of a nave, north and south aisles, a south porch, a chancel with a north aisle containing a chapel and a vestry, and a west tower. The tower has three stages, a south stair turret, angle buttresses, and a two-light west window, above which is a clock face, two-light bell openings, and an embattled parapet on corbels, with grotesque gargoyles, and a weathervane on the northwest corner.	I
Abbey Cottage; 54.29309°N 1.78700°W	—	14th century	Part of a medieval manorial complex, later a house, in stone with an artificial slate roof. There are two storeys and two offset parallel ranges, and a later single-storey extension to the left. It contains fragments of medieval masonry, 20th-century windows and blocked windows. At the rear are two medieval doorways to a screens passage, one blocked, with pointed double-chamfered arches.	II
Old Hall Farmhouse; 54.29328°N 1.78710°W	—	16th century or earlier	Part of a medieval manorial complex, later a farmhouse, it is in stone with quoins and a tile roof. There are two ranges, forming a T-shaped plan. The main range has two storeys and an attic, and three bays, and it contains various openings. The rear wing has two storeys and a rear outshut. Its openings include a casement window, and mullioned windows.	II
Pippingill; 54.29322°N 1.78634°W		Late 17th century	Part of a medieval manorial complex, later a house, in stone with an artificial slate roof. There are two storeys, and an L-shaped plan. The south range has three bays and 20th-century openings, and the rear range contains three mullioned windows. On the west side is a large projecting chimney breast containing two fire windows.	II
Spennithorne Hall; 54.29573°N 1.79036°W		18th century	A large house in rendered stone with an artificial slate roof, and two ranges at right angles. The south front has two storeys and seven bays, with rusticated quoins on the right, and a pediment on a parapet over the middle three bays. In the centre is a Roman Doric porch with a pediment, and a doorway with a fanlight. The outer bays contain semicircular bow windows with Roman Doric engaged columns. The other windows are sashes, and the openings have sandstone surrounds. The rear range has two storeys and attics, and five bays, and in the angle is a porch with Doric columns and an embattled parapet.	II
Terrace retaining wall, Spennithorne Hall; 54.29541°N 1.79035°W	—	18th century	The wall is in brick with sandstone details and stone capping. It is about 2 metres (6 ft 7 in) in height, and has a central opening for nine steps. The opening is flanked by stone urns, and towards the east end is a ball finial.	II
Hallwith House; 54.28728°N 1.77574°W	—	Late 18th to early 19th century	The farmhouse is in roughcast stone, and has a Welsh slate roof with stone copings and shaped kneelers. There are two storeys, a double depth plan, three bays, and flanking narrower wings with one storey and attics. The central round-arched doorway has a sandstone shouldered surround, with impost blocks and a semicircular fanlight, The windows are sashes with sandstone surrounds, and hood moulds on the ground floor. At the rear is a round-arched stair window.	II
Railings, gates, gate piers and walls, Spennithorne Hall; 54.29589°N 1.79089°W		Early 19th century	Flanking the entrances to the house are four square gate piers in rusticated sandstone, the outer pair with coved caps, and the inner pair with a plain frieze and a pyramidal cap. Between the two right piers are wrought iron railings on a low stone wall, and between the others are wrought iron gates. The boundary walls are in stone.	II
Coach house, Spennithorne House; 54.29685°N 1.79225°W	—	Early 19th century	The coach house is in stone with a stone slate roof. The left part has two storeys, and contains a round carriage arch of voussoirs, doorways and vents, and the roof has stone coping on the left. The right part has three storeys, and a hipped roof with a finial. It contains doorways, windows and a vent, and on the top floor is a circular dovecote opening with keystones.	II
School; 54.29842°N 1.79165°W		1833	The school is in stone, and has an artificial slate roof with a coped left gable surmounted by a bellcote. There is a single storey, three bays and a rear wing on the left. On the front is a gabled porch with an inscribed and dated plaque. The windows are casements with round arches, imposts and keystones, and the openings have sandstone surrounds.	II
School House; 54.29830°N 1.79170°W		Early to mid-19th century	The house is in stone, and has a stone slate roof with stone copings. There are two storeys and two bays. The doorway is in the centre, the windows are casements with two lights and mullions, and all the openings have hood moulds with urn stops.	II
Railings and gates, Chaytor memorial 54.29616°N 1.79127°W	—	19th century	The memorial is in the churchyard of St Michael's Church, to the west of the church. It is enclosed by cast iron railings and gates, forming a five-sided plan. The railings are on a four-sided stone base, there are octagonal interval columns, and a pair of gates.	II
Sebastopol Cross and base 54.29619°N 1.79058°W		Mid-19th century and earlier	The cross is in the churchyard of St Michael's Church, to the east of the church. It was moved from Sevastopol and placed on a family vault, and stands on a base of five octagonal stone steps with engraved names. The cross is in wrought iron, on a globe, and has perforated arms ending in quatrefoils, with spikes in the angles. It is enclosed by a low wall and wrought iron railings.	II
Gates and gate piers, Spennithorne House; 54.29595°N 1.79127°W	—	19th century	The gate piers flanking the entrance to the drive are in sandstone with vermiculated rustication. Each pier has an entablature, a frieze containing a vermiculated oval, and a pedestal on which is a ball finial with a vermiculated box. The gates are in wrought iron and have a scalloped upper line.	II
