= Old Hall, Bellerby =

House in Bellerby, North Yorkshire, England

Coordinates: 54.331°N 1.824°W

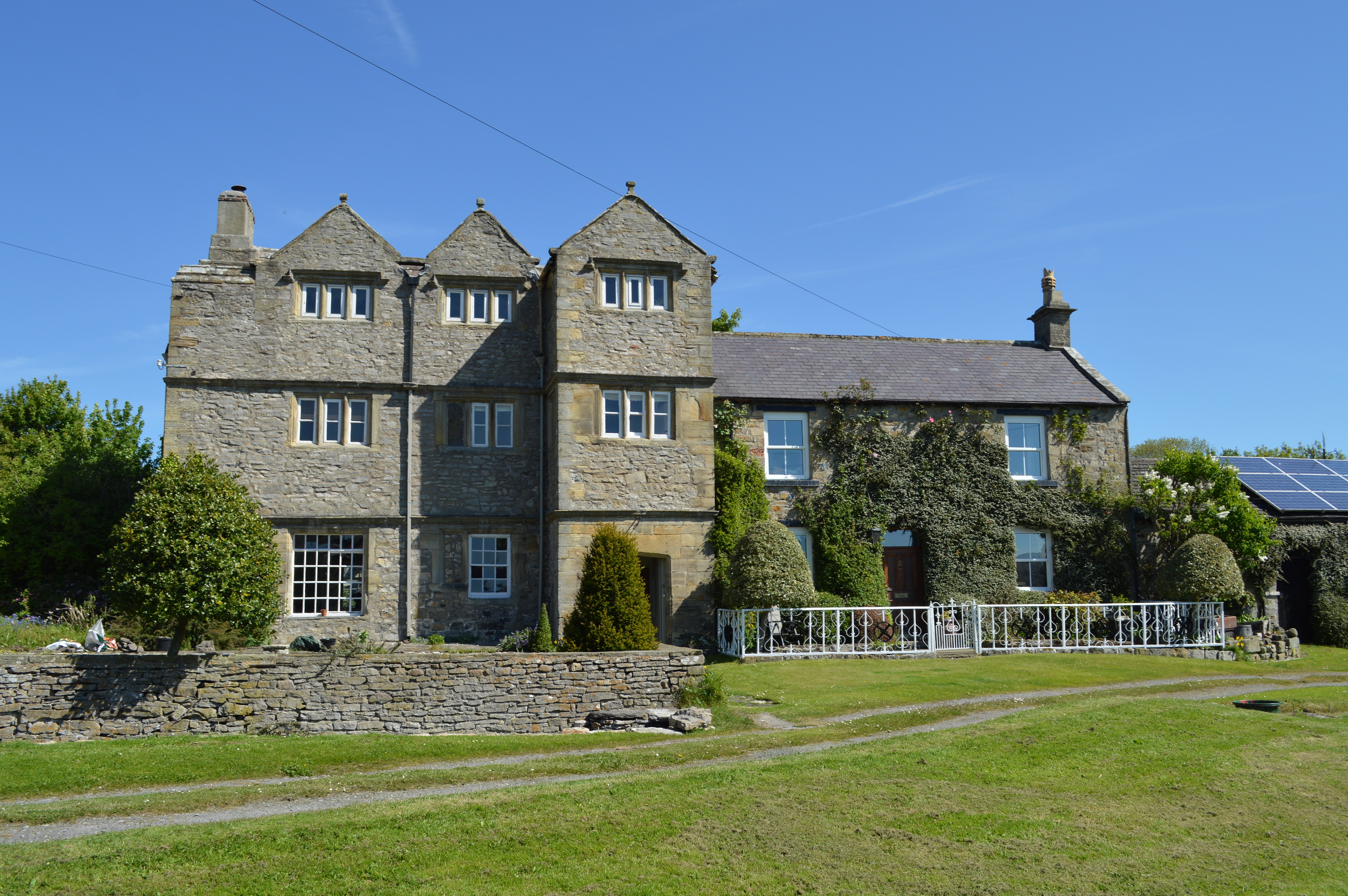
The house, in 2015

Old Hall is a historic building in Bellerby, a village in North Yorkshire in England.

The first mention of the manor house is from 1575, when Thomas Metcalfe's will names eight rooms: parlour, buttery, chamber over the parlour, storehouse next the same chamber, chamber over the hall, chamber over the kitchen, kitchen and hall. His will also details the furnishings of the house. The hall was rebuilt in the early 17th century, since when the main changes have been the replacement of many of the windows in the Georgian period, and the addition of a 20th-century porch on the east side. The building was grade II* listed in 1967.

The three-storey building is constructed of limestone rubble, with sandstone dressings, and a stone slate roof. It has an L-shaped plan, with the wing projecting to the rear left. Each bay has a stone coped gable with shaped kneelers and a ball finial, and to the left of the left bay is a coped parapet. The right bay projects as a tower porch, it contains a doorway with a quoined surround and a cambered lintel with a triangular soffit, and the inner doorway has a Tudor arch. The windows are double-chamfered and mullioned, some with hood moulds. Inside, original features include a Tudor-arched fireplace in the downstairs left room, and two smaller similar fireplaces on the first floor, and three doors: one leading out of the hall, and two to first-floor cupboards. Several original beams are visible, including one with early iron straps.

== See also ==
- Grade II* listed buildings in North Yorkshire (district)
- Listed buildings in Bellerby
