= Spennithorne Old Hall =

Former house in Spennithorne, England

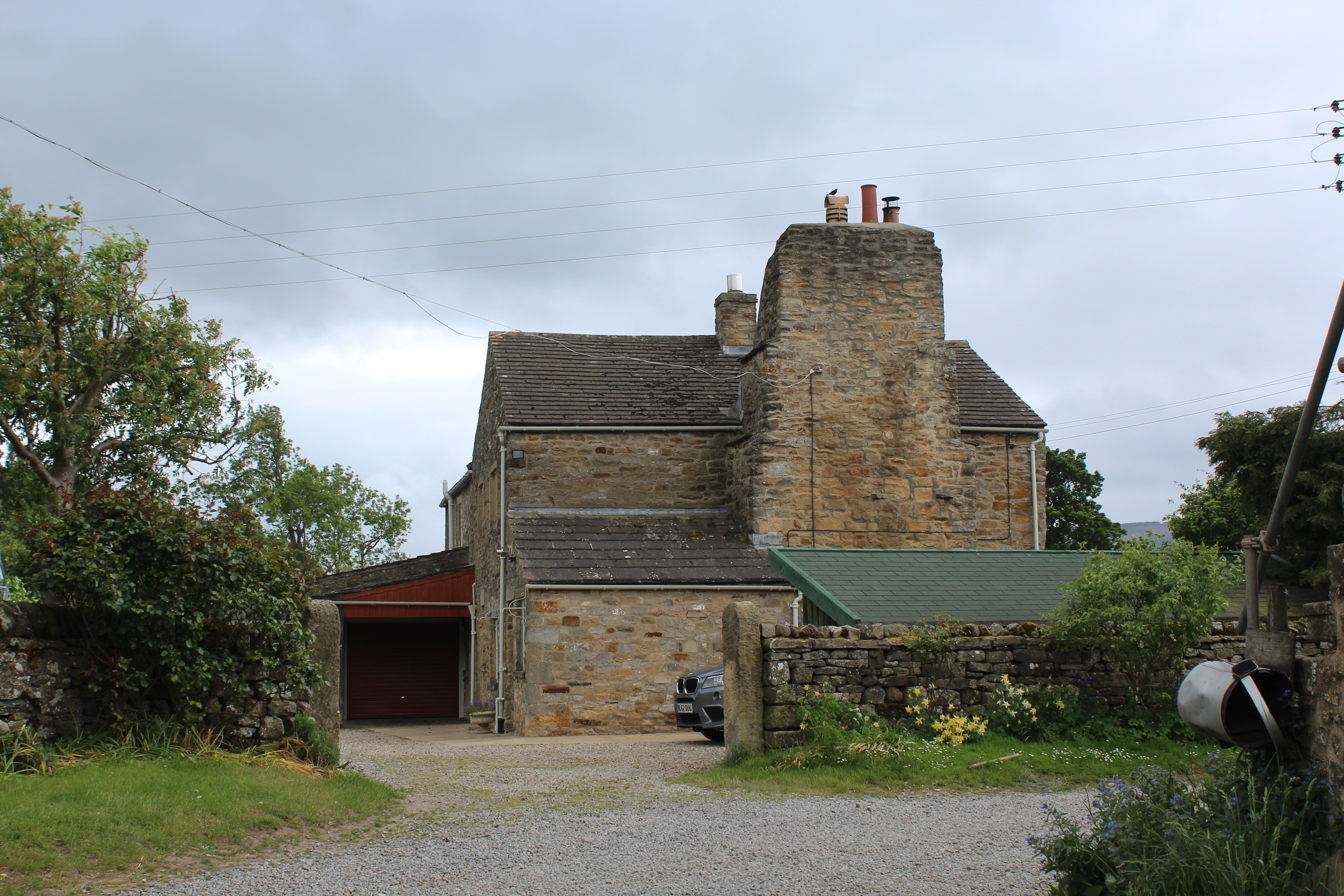
Pippingill

Spennithorne Old Hall was a manor house in Spennithorne, a village in North Yorkshire, in England.

The house was built for the Fitz Randall family, in about 1300. A replacement house was built on a new site in the 18th century, but three separate sections of the old complex of buildings survive. The oldest is Abbey Cottage, which retains 14th century material, though it has been heavily remodelled. Old Hall Farmhouse is largely 16th century, though it may also retain some earlier material, and Pippingill is late 17th century. All three buildings are separately grade II listed.

== Abbey Cottage ==
The house (54°17′35″N 1°47′13″W) is built of stone with an artificial slate roof. It has two storeys and two offset parallel ranges, and a later single-storey extension to the left. It contains fragments of medieval masonry, 20th-century windows and blocked windows. At the rear are two medieval doorways to a screens passage, one blocked, with pointed double-chamfered arches. The passage survives inside, with four original doorways, leading to the former pantry, kitchen, buttery and staircase.

== Old Hall Farmhouse ==
The farmhouse (54°17′36″N 1°47′13″W) is built of stone with quoins and a tile roof. It has two ranges, forming a T-shaped plan. The main range has two storeys and an attic, and three bays, and it contains various openings. The rear wing has two storeys and a rear outshut. Its openings include a casement window, and mullioned windows.

== Pippingill ==
The house (54°17′36″N 1°47′11″W) is built of stone with an artificial slate roof. It has two storeys, and an L-shaped plan. The south range has three bays and 20th-century openings, and the rear range contains three mullioned windows. On the west side is a large projecting chimney breast containing two fire windows, which contains inside a large early fireplace.

== See also ==
- Listed buildings in Spennithorne
