= Listed buildings in Bellerby =

Bellerby is a civil parish in the county of North Yorkshire, England. It contains ten listed buildings that are recorded in the National Heritage List for England. Of these, one is listed at Grade II*, the middle of the three grades, and the others are at Grade II, the lowest grade. The parish contains the village of Bellerby and the surrounding area. All the listed buildings are in the village and, apart from a church, they are all houses.

== Key ==
Grade	Criteria
II*	Particularly important buildings of more than special interest
II	Buildings of national importance and special interest

== Buildings ==
Name and location	Photograph	Date	Notes	Grade
Manor House; 54.32826°N 1.82665°W	—	Late 16th century	A stone farmhouse with a moulded cornice, and a stone slate roof with stone copings and shaped kneelers. There are two storeys, four bays, and a rear outshut. On the front is a gabled porch with a chamfered pointed arch, and a doorway with a quoined moulded and chamfered surround. To its right is a mullioned and transomed window, and the other windows on the front are sashes. There is a round-arched stair window in the outshut, and a two-storey canted bay window on the left return.	II
Old Hall; 54.33169°N 1.82452°W		c. 1627	The house is in limestone with sandstone dressings, quoins, moulded string courses, and a stone slate roof. There are three storeys and three bays, and an L-shaped plan with a rear wing on the left. Each bay has a stone coped gable with shaped kneelers and a ball finial, and to the left of the left bay is a coped parapet. The right bay projects as a tower porch, it contains a doorway with a quoined surround and a cambered lintel with a triangular soffit, and the inner doorway has a Tudor arch. The windows are double-chamfered and mullioned, some with hood moulds.	II*
Boar House; 54.33171°N 1.82372°W	—	Late 17th to early 18th century	The house, at one time an inn, is in pebbledashed stone, and has a stone slate roof with stone copings. There are two storeys and three bays, the middle bay projecting as a full-height porch. The windows in the ground floor are casements, and in the upper floor they are sashes.	II
House of Mrs Kane and Windrush; 54.33221°N 1.83047°W	—	Late 17th to early 18th century	A house later divided into two, in whitewashed stone, with stone dressings, chamfered quoins, a moulded string course, and a stone slate roof with stone copings and kneelers with grotesque heads. There are two storeys, six bays and a rear outshut. In the third bay is a doorway with an eared architrave, and a lintel with a face mask and festoons, and in the sixth bay is a doorway with pointed panels under the lintel. The windows in the ground floor are two-light casements with panelled mullions, and a face mask and festoons on each lintel. In the top floor are three horizontally-sliding sash windows, two oculi and a casement window.	II
Corner Cottage; 54.33048°N 1.82212°W	—	Early 18th century	The house is in stone, and has a Welsh slate roof with stone copings. There are two storeys and three bays. On the front is a gabled porch, and to the right is a doorway with a chamfered surround and a four-centred arched soffit. The ground floor windows are double-chamfered and mullioned, and in the upper floor are two sash windows and one casement.	II
Old Brook House; 54.33095°N 1.824119°W	—	1732	The house, at one time an inn, in stone with a Welsh slate roof, stone copings and shaped kneelers. There are three storeys and three bays. The central doorway has panelled pilasters on tall plinths with fluted capitals, a fanlight, and a moulded round arch with an initialled keystone. The windows are sashes, those in the top floor are horizontally-sliding. At the rear is a round-arched stair window.	II
The Lilacs; 54.33067°N 1.82239°W	—	Mid 18th century	The house is in stone with a stone slate roof, three storeys and three bays. In the centre is a porch, and a doorway with a pulvinated frieze and a cornice. The windows in the lower two floors are sashes, and in the top floor they are casements.	II
Kirkbank; 54.33170°N 1.82392°W	—	Late 18th century	At one time a vicarage, it is a stone house with quoins, and a stone slate roof with stone copings and shaped kneelers. There are two storeys and four bays. The windows are sashes with brick surrounds, those in the upper floor with a quoined effect, and all with stone keystones.	II
East Grange; 54.33146°N 1.82195°W		Late 18th to early 19th century	The house is in stone, and has a Welsh slate roof with stone copings and shaped kneelers. There are two storeys and two bays, and a single-storey rear wing. In the centre is a Tuscan doorcase with a pediment, and the windows on the front are sashes in architraves. At the rear are sash windows in plain surrounds, and a round-headed stair window with imposts.	II
St John's Church; 54.33023°N 1.82391°W		1874	The church is built in stone with a Welsh slate roof. It consists of a three-bay nave with a south porch, a two-bay chancel with a north vestry, and a southwest steeple. The steeple is octagonal with string courses, louvred openings, and an octagonal spire. The porch is gabled and has buttresses, and a pointed doorway with a chamfered surround.	II
