= Bellerby =

Village and civil parish in North Yorkshire, England

Coordinates: 54°19′51″N 1°49′24″W

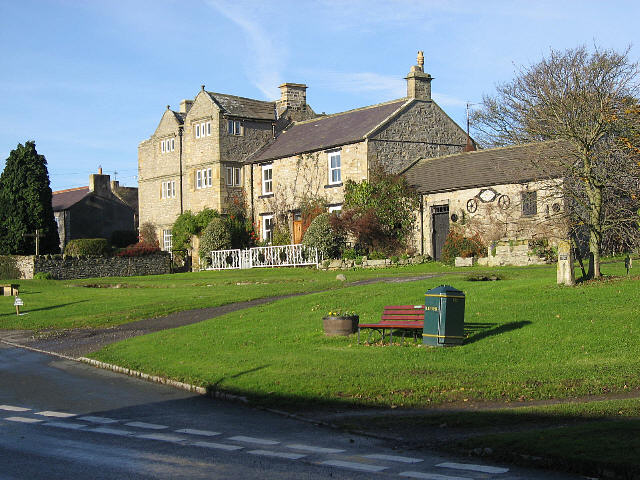
- Houses beside Bellerby village green

- Location within North Yorkshire
- Population: 364 (2011 census)
- OS grid reference: SE114928
- Civil parish: Bellerby
- Unitary authority: North Yorkshire
- Ceremonial county: North Yorkshire
- Region: Yorkshire and the Humber
- Country: England
- Sovereign state: United Kingdom
- Post town: Leyburn
- Postcode district: DL8
- Police: North Yorkshire
- Fire: North Yorkshire
- Ambulance: Yorkshire

Bellerby is a village and civil parish in North Yorkshire, England, about 7 miles (11 km) south-west of Richmond. The village has one pub, the Cross Keys, a small and historic Anglican church and a Methodist chapel. It is 1.5 miles (2.4 km) from the market town of Leyburn. Bellerby is approximately 250 miles (400 km) north of London. Bellerby is situated 673 feet (205 m) above sea level and is surrounded by low-lying hills with an open south-easterly aspect. Moorland is located to the north and west of the village. Becks are an attractive feature of the village, which boasts many. The residents of Bellerby are also proud of their large population of ducks who thrive in the becks and in the suitable gardens of many friendly residents. The closest big town is Leyburn.

From 1974 to 2023 it was part of the district of Richmondshire; it is now administered by the unitary North Yorkshire Council.

== Population and history ==
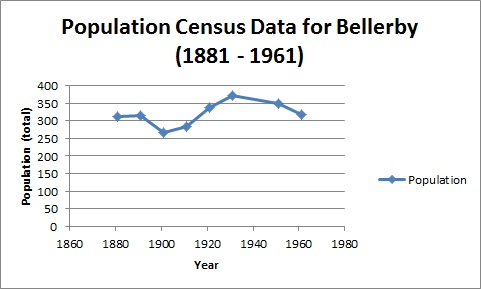
A graph showing the changing population of Bellerby between 1881 and 1961.

Between 1870 and 1872 Bellerby was described as "a township-chapelry in Spennithorne parish, N. R. Yorkshire; 1½ mile N of Leyburn r. station".

According to the 2011 census Bellerby had a population of 364 people. This is an increase of the noted population 130 years earlier in 1881 at 311 people residing within Bellerby. The population of the village decreased to 266 in 1901, proceeding to stay low until 1931 when the population peaked at 370. The population then decreased to 318 in 1961 and appears to have remained constant ever since. The population of Bellerby could have decreased in the early 1900s due to a large proportion of people migrating from the UK (and from all over Europe) to America seeking job opportunities and to experience the ever-expanding American cities such as New York. Another reason for the decrease of the village population could be urbanisation. Because urbanisation offers many job opportunities and the prospect of a better and more fulfilled life within the city many villagers and people who had formerly lived in rural areas of the UK migrated to the bigger cities.

Bellerby is mentioned in the Domesday Book. In the book Bellerby was known as "Belgebi" which derives from Old Norse meaning Berg's farmstead or clearing. The book describes Bellerby as being medium by having a population of 15 households, and the total tax assessed as large (6 geld units). The households are broken down into 13 villagers and 2 smallholders. Bellerby's Value to the Lord in 1066 is noted as £1.6 and its Value to the Lord in 1086 remains the same. Bellerby had 6 ploughlands (ploughs possible), 1 lord's plough team, 4 men's plough teams and an 8-acre meadow. The Lord in 1066 was Thor. The Lord in 1086 was Enisant Musard. The Tenant-in-chief in 1086 was Count Alan of Brittany. Phillimore reference: 6N104

== Age structure ==
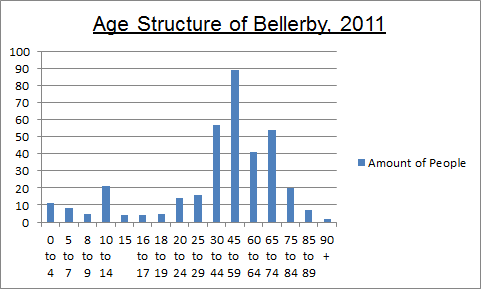
A graph showing the population structure of Bellerby during 2011

According to the 2011 census which shows the age structure of the people who live in Bellerby we can assume that this village is affluent and gentrified. As you can see on the graph to the right 24.9% of the people living in Bellerby are aged 45 – 59 and 14.8% aged 65 – 74.< 95.1% of the people living in Bellerby in 2011 were born in England (the remaining people being from Wales, Scotland, Northern Ireland and other EU countries) which suggests that the people living in Bellerby have no cultural affluence and are traditionally British.

The diagram shows the age structure of Bellerby during 2011.

== Dwellings, household spaces and accommodation ==
In 2011, Bellerby had a count of 193 dwellings within its boundaries. 100% of these dwellings were recorded as unshared. 88 of them were detached household spaces, 63 semi-detached and 41 terraced with no purpose-built flats or apartments. One of these dwellings was recorded as a flat, maisonette or apartment as part of a converted or shared house. This suggests that the residents of Bellerby are middle to upper class as many of the households are detached with no apartment blocks in the area.

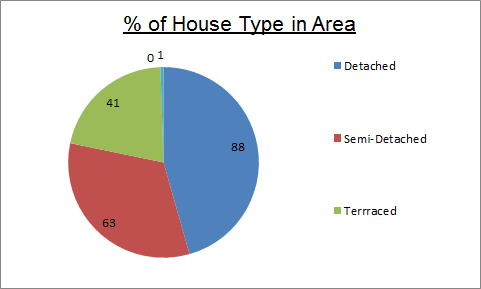
A pie chart showing the percentage of house types in Bellerby in 2011

== Economics ==
In 2011 Bellerby had 280 usual residents (aged 16 – 74). 32 of these residents worked part-time, 104 worked full-time, 58 were self-employed, 7 were unemployed, 1 was a full-time student and 70 were retired. This suggests that many of the residents residing in Bellerby are middle to elderly. This data also suggests that Bellerby is an economically stable area with a low percentage of unemployed people.

In Bellerby there are 145 usual male residents and 135 usual female residents. 64 of the male residents are employed in a full-time job, and 40 of the females are employed in a full-time job. None of the males in Bellerby are unemployed to stay at home to look after their family compared to 1 female who is unemployed and stays at home to look after family. This suggests that Bellerby has a strong working economy where the majority of residents are employed. 36 of the male residents in Bellerby are self-employed compared to 22 of the female residents. The adjacent diagram shows the percentages of different housing types in Bellerby.

== St John's Church ==
St John's Church was blessed on 24 March 1874. It has three buildings, the first of the three buildings was built before 1801. The present church was designed to be more colourful than its predecessor, with stained glass windows showing the birth, death and resurrection of Jesus. Bellerby was first documented in the Domesday Book in 1086, and originally in the Parish of Spennithorne. It is recorded that the parishioners of Bellerby and Skeltoncote sent a petition to the Pope in Rome in 1474 (Pope Sixtus IV), asking him to sponsor the use of a chapel in Bellerby for Mass and the appointment by the Rector of Spennithorne of a priest to serve the Chapel, and provided him with a home in Bellerby. In 1847 Bellerby chapel was licensed for Baptisms, Marriages, Burials, and this is also when the registers began. After a lot of fund raising on the parish's behalf, the church was restored with a new roof and decoration inside. In January 2006, a carpet was fitted within St John's Church.

== Weather ==
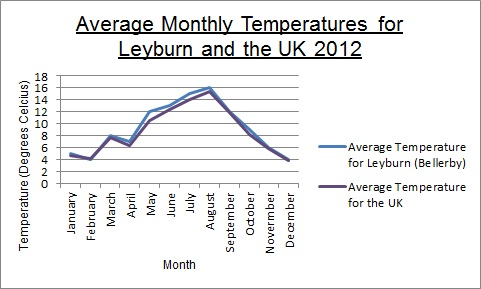
A graph showing the average monthly temperatures for Bellerby and the UK during 2012

Bellerby has experienced severe floods across its history; the most recent floods occurred during October 2012 (said to be the second great flood since the 1930s), and in June 2019. The flood of 2012 occurred due to a month's worth of rain falling over a 24-hour period. Consequently, some of the homes in Bellerby were flooded by up to 3 feet (0.91 m) of water. Bellerby's monthly average temperatures for 2012 averaged with those of the UK as a whole as shown in the adjacent diagram.

In 2019, Bellerby was subjected to further flooding when the area suffered a 1-in-a-100 year flooding event.

== See also ==
- Listed buildings in Bellerby
