= St Michael's Church, Spennithorne =

Church in Spennithorne, North Yorkshire, England

Coordinates: 54.2962°N 1.7910°W

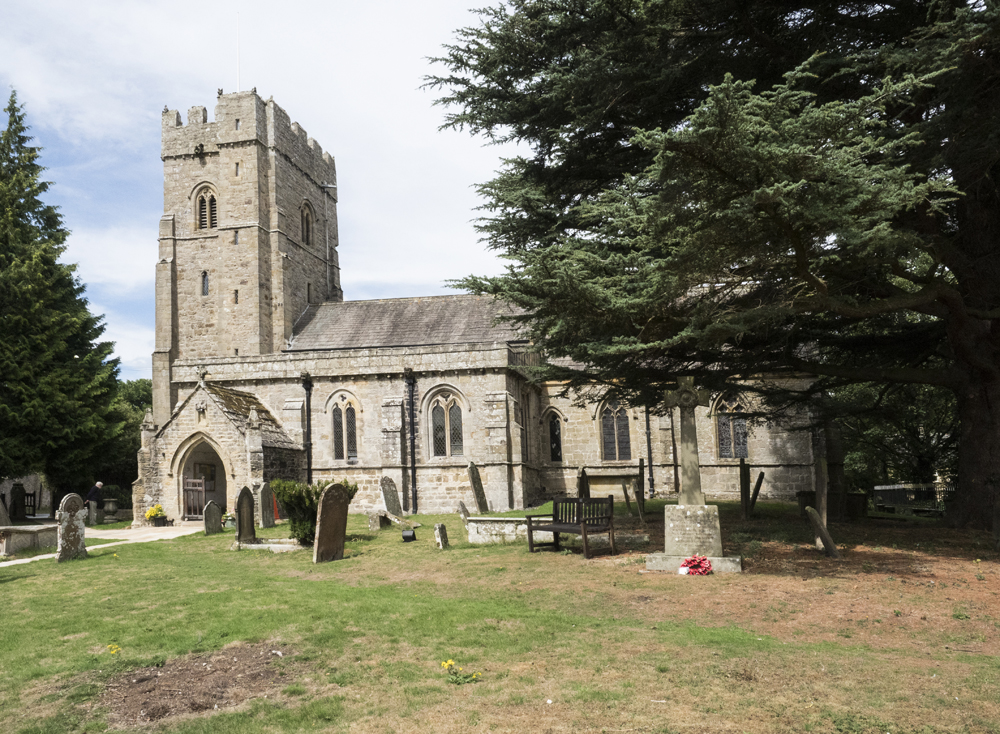
The church, in 2018

St Michael's Church is the parish church of Spennithorne, a village in North Yorkshire, in England.

The church was originally built in about 1150, from which period the north arcade of the nave survives. The south aisle of the nave was added in the 13th century, when the north aisle was lengthened, while in the 14th century, a west tower, porch and vestry were added, the aisles were widened, and the chancel was rebuilt. The north wall of the north aisle was rebuilt around 1480 and again around 1620, this second rebuilding also seeing it lengthened to provide a Lady Chapel. In 1872, it was restored by George Fowler Jones. The building was grade I listed in 1967.

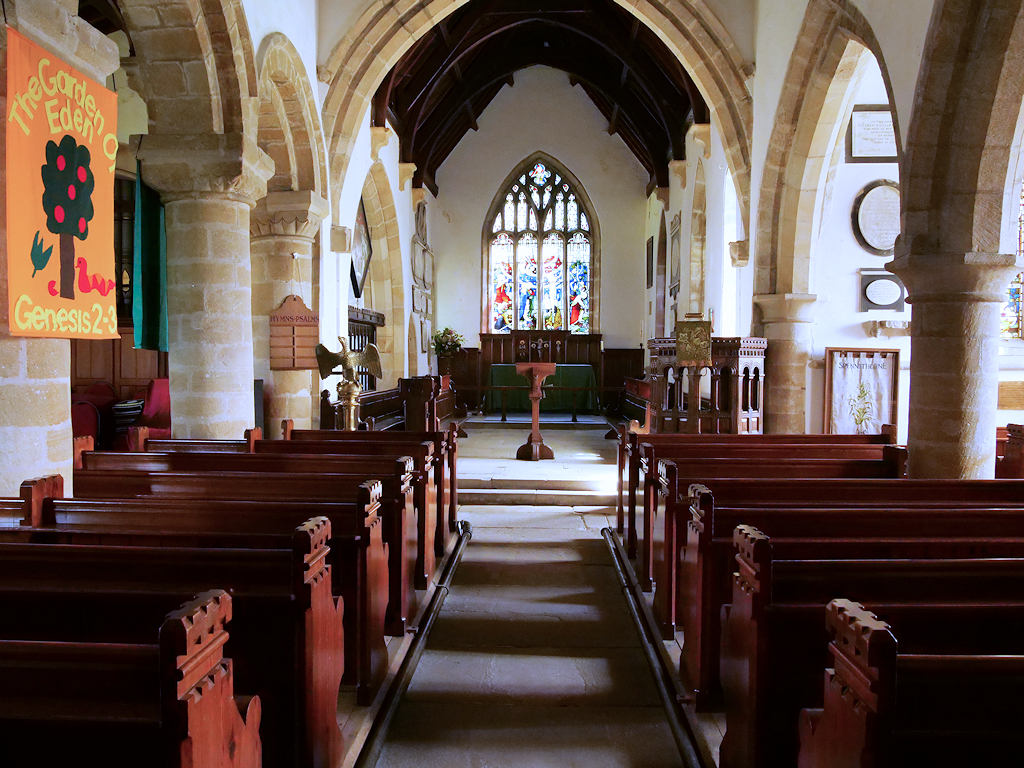
View from the nave into the chancel

The church is built of sandstone with Westmorland slate roofs, and consists of a nave, north and south aisles, a south porch, a chancel with a north aisle containing a chapel and a vestry, and a west tower. The tower has three stages, a south stair turret, angle buttresses, and a two-light west window, above which is a clock face, two-light bell openings, and an embattled parapet on corbels, with grotesque gargoyles, and a weathervane on the northwest corner. Inside, the north chapel has a screen dating from around 1400. The chancel has an aumbry, piscina and sedilia. There is a mediaeval tomb chest, two mediaeval bench ends, and a mediaeval wall painting of Father Time.

== See also ==
- Grade I listed buildings in North Yorkshire (district)
- Listed buildings in Spennithorne
