= Spennithorne =

Village and civil parish in North Yorkshire, England

Coordinates: 54°17′50″N 1°47′31″W

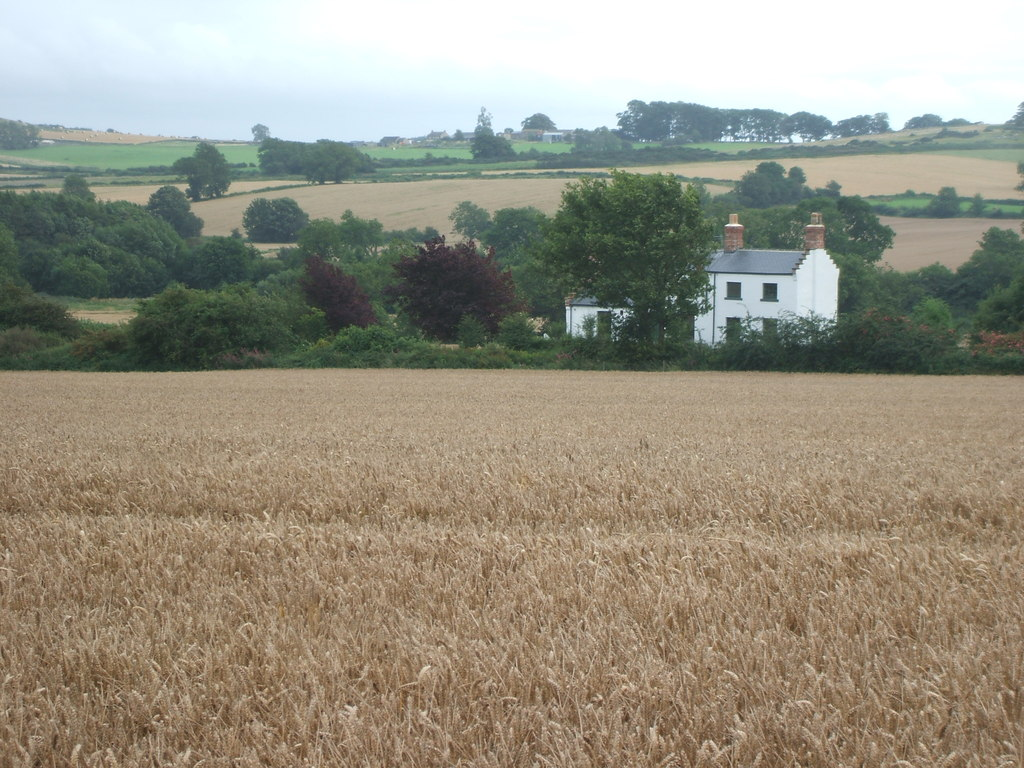
- Spennithorne Railway Station Site

- Location within North Yorkshire
- Population: 198 (Including Hutton Hang)2011 UK Census)
- OS grid reference: SE136890
  - London: 200 mi (320 km) SSE
- Unitary authority: North Yorkshire
- Ceremonial county: North Yorkshire
- Region: Yorkshire and the Humber
- Country: England
- Sovereign state: United Kingdom
- Post town: Leyburn
- Postcode district: DL8
- Police: North Yorkshire
- Fire: North Yorkshire
- Ambulance: Yorkshire

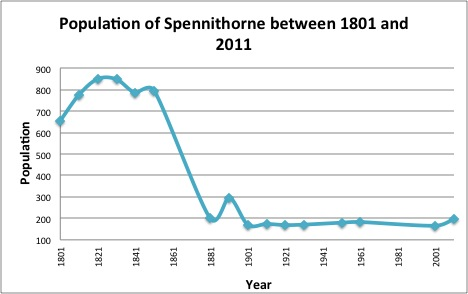
Population of Spennithorne, 1801 to 2011

Population Structure in Spennithorne between 1801 and 2011

Total Number of Houses in Spennithorne between 1841 and 1961

Total House Occupancy in Spennithorne between 1841 and 1961

Spennithorne is a village and civil parish in lower Wensleydale in North Yorkshire, England. The village is situated 2 miles (3.2 km) south-east of the market town Leyburn, on a slight elevation above the River Ure, which forms the southern boundary of the parish. The village is overlooked by the steeple of St Michael and All Angels Church.

Spennithorne is approximately 4 miles (6 km) east from Yorkshire Dales National Park containing a range of wildlife habitats.

The village was historically in the North Riding of Yorkshire until 1974. From 1974 to 2023 it was part of the district of Richmondshire. It is now administered by the unitary North Yorkshire Council.

== History ==
Although Spennithorne dates from Saxon times, there are very few facts recorded relating to its history. At the period of the Norman Conquest, Alan Rufus, to whom the Conqueror gave the whole of Richmondshire, distributed his lands among his retainers in feudal fashion, and in this division Spennithorne and Middleham were allotted to his brother, Ribal Fitzrandolph.

In the Domesday Book Spennithorne is referred to as "Speningtorp" which Dr Whitaker states as the thorp or village of the "Spening", or a prickly thorn.

From 1856 on, the village was served by Spennithorne railway station, 1 mile (1.6 km) north-east of the village.

In 1870–72, John Marius Wilson's Imperial Gazetteer of England and Wales described Spennithorne as:

a township and a parish in Leyburn district, N. R. Yorkshire. The township lies on the river Ure, near the Leyburn railway, 2 miles SE by E of Leyburn; and has a station on the railway, and a post-office under Bedale. Acres, 1,280. Real property, £2,457. Pop., 198. Houses, 45. The parish includes two other townships, and comprises 4,680 acres. Pop., 852. Houses, 191. The property is much subdivided. S. Hall is a chief residence. The living is a rectory in the diocese of Ripon. Value, £425. Patron, M. Wyvill, Esq. The church is ancient. The p. curacy of Bellerby is a separate benefice. Hutchinson, the Hebraist, was a native.

=== Parish history ===
Spennithorne was historically a large parish, and included the townships of Harmby and Bellerby, which both became separate civil parishes in 1866. Harmby Beck flows into the River Ure near the village, here perhaps was Spennithorne Mill in existence in 1301, however there is no trace of its remains.

== Geography ==
Near Colliwath Wood lies the northern boundary of the parish and the southern boundary runs along the River Ure almost parallel with the A6108, about 0.3 miles (0.4 km) south.

The nearest settlements to Spennithorne include Harmby 0.8 miles (1.3 km) north-west and Middleham 2.9 miles (4.7 km) south. The nearest major city is Darlington 27 miles (43 km) north-east.

The nearest railway station is at Leyburn, 2 miles (3.2 km) north west.

=== Geology ===
The soil is loam; composed of sand, silt and clay on a subsoil of limestone. A variety of crops are grown here with great pasture for cattle.

== Demographics ==
The first UK census in 1801 recorded the total population of the then parish (which included Harmby and Bellerby) at 655, and the highest recorded population total was in the 1831 census at 848 residents. By 1881 the parish was much smaller, and the population was a total of 200, The 2001 census data recorded the total population at 166 of which 79 were male and 87 were female. Of those, 154 of the residents stated their religion to be Christian and 100% of the parish were white British. The 2011 census data recorded the total population at 198, an increase of 32 from previous 2001 figures, of which 95 were male and 103 female. Of those, 151 of the residents stated their religion to be Christian and 98% of the parish were white British.

=== Housing ===
According to the 1841 census there were 199 houses in the parish (which then included Harmby and Bellerby). By 1921 the parish was much smaller, and there were only 37 houses in the parish.

== Occupational structure ==
Using information provided by the Vision of Britain website from 1881, it is possible to see the history of the social structure during the 19th century in Spennithorne and specifically the areas of occupation. There are 14 main categories of occupation, with the largest occupational status being Domestic Services and Offices (31%) with 37 people employed within this field. The next occupational status was Unspecified Occupation (12%) with 23 people and lowest occupational status' were Country Defence (1%) and Transport & Communication (1%) employing 2 people, of the 200 residents in the area.

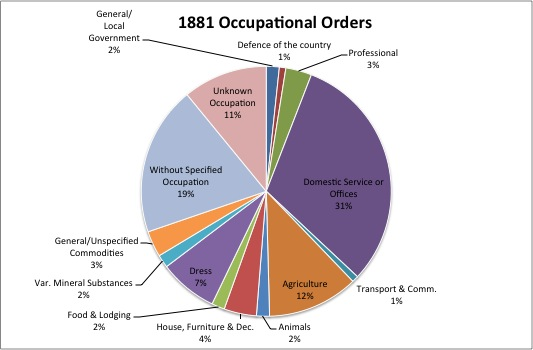
Occuptional Structure in Spennithorne in 1881

== Landmarks ==
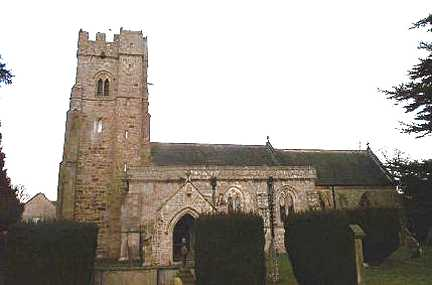
The Church of St Michael and All Angels, Spennithorne

St Michael's Church, Spennithorne, a Grade I listed building is said to have been erected by Robert Fitzrandolph in 1166. The Church was completely demolished to make way for its Norman successor with only two or three small fragments being discovered: two stones with Runic ornament which have been built into the east wall of the chancel; and a Saxon monument recently discovered under the floor of the chancel which has now been placed in the wall of the vestry. The interior of the church also contains tablets to the family of Chaytor. By the mid-12th century, St Michael and All Angels Church had been built and enlarged. The existing church tower dates back to around the 14th century when the aisles were also widened to their current width, along with the channel being rebuilt and extended eastwards to its present length with the vestry being added on the north side. In 1872 the church was again thoroughly restored, costing around £2,000. The work was carried out under plans prepared by Mr Fowler Jones of York who preserved all the old fabric which was capable of restoration, with all construction done in strict conformity with the style of the original building. The structure of the church now resembles a medieval building of which majority remains in the 21st century. In the 1970s and 1980s Spennithorne church featured in the BBC series All Creatures Great and Small.

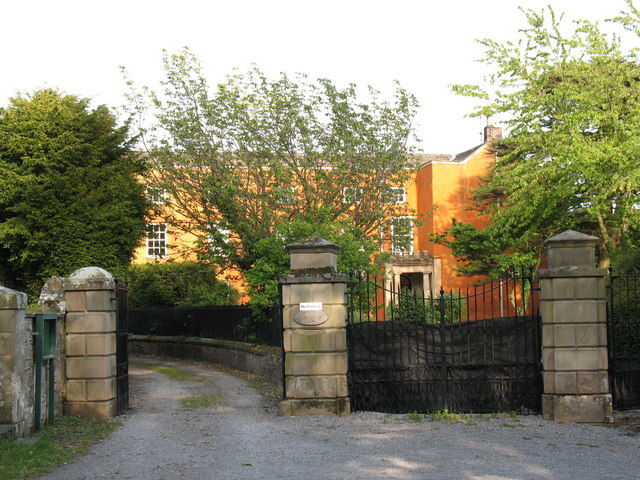
Spennithorne Hall

Spennithorne Hall, the seat of C. D. Chaytor, Esq., J.P., dating back mainly to the early 18th century is best seen from the hillside to the east of Middleham. The Hall is a Grade II listed building and is described as "a handsome mansion, occupying a delightful situation".

Thorney Hall is another mansion in Spennithorne, built for the Orde-Powlett family by Lord Bolton in 1860, and later owned by the Ferrand family. Set within five acres of formal garden and woodland, it has fine views across the dales to Middleham Castle. From 1960, it was owned by the Ministry of Defence and used as a residence for the commander of Catterick Camp.

== Notable people ==
- John Hutchinson (1674–1737) – Bulmer's History and Directory of North Yorkshire (1890) states: "Spennithorne was the birthplace of John Hutchinson, a philological and biblical writer in his own day, however now almost forgotten. Hutchinson was the son of a yeoman, and through obtaining a liberal education he served steward to several families of position, notably the Duke of Somerset receiving a sinecure appointment worth £200 a year."
- The Straubenzee family established a presence in Spennithorne House by the end of the 18th century.
