= 5 Queen Street =

Building in Scarborough, North Yorkshire, England

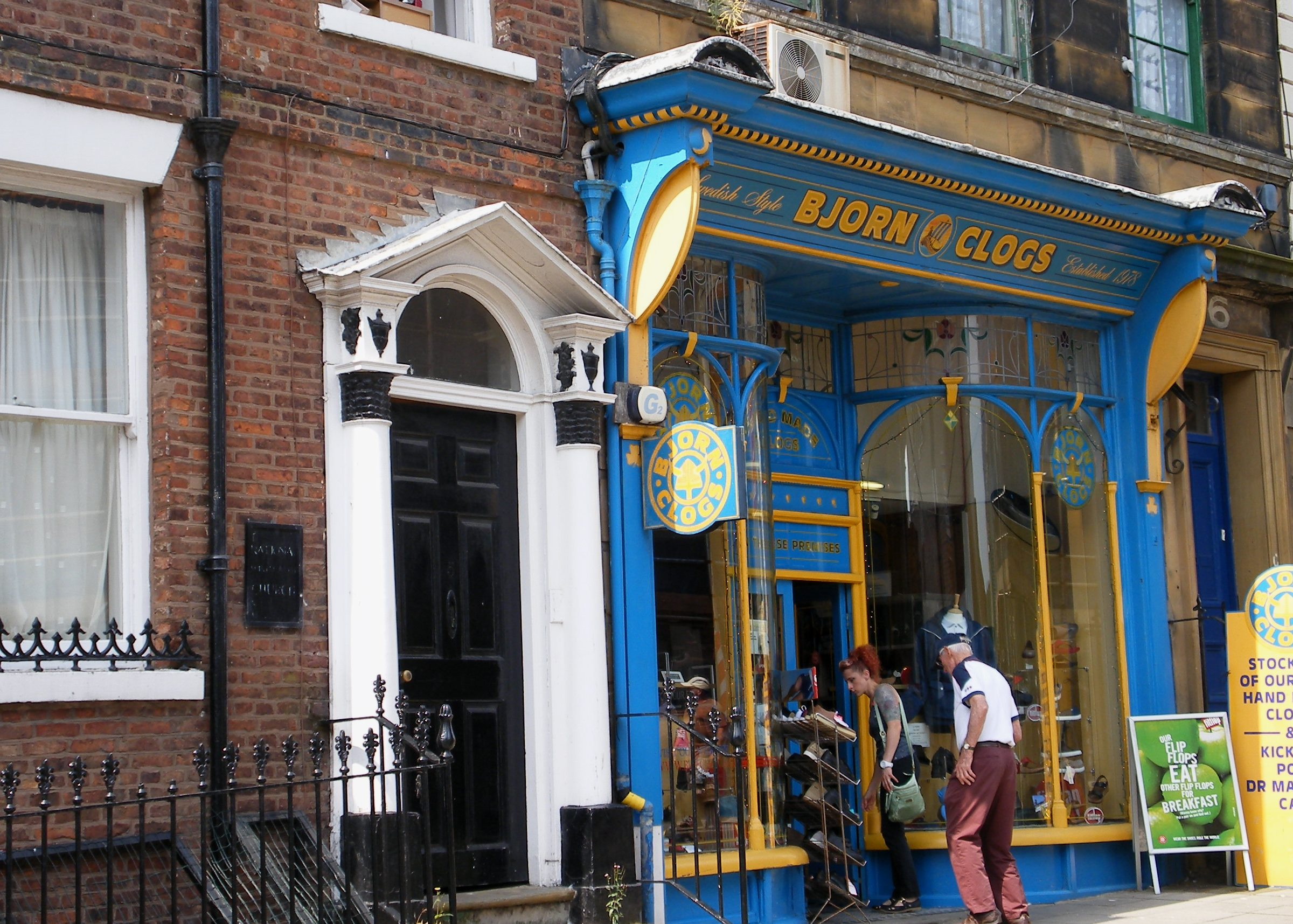
- Doorway to the building (on left)
- Interactive map of the 5 Queen Street area

General information
- Coordinates: 54°17′0.24″N 0°23′54.26″W

Technical details
- Material: Red brick
- Floor count: 3

5 Queen Street is a historic building in Scarborough, North Yorkshire, a town in England.

The house was constructed in the late 18th century, on Queen Street in the centre of Scarborough. Iron railings were added to the front in the 19th century. The building was grade II* listed in 1953. Historic England notes that it forms part of a group with 6, 7 and 8 to 13 Queen Street.

The house is built of red brick, with floor bands, a frieze and a slate roof. It has three storeys, a basement and an attic, and three bays. The doorway in the right bay is approached by steps, and has engaged Corinthian columns, a semicircular fanlight, a broken entablature with a vase in relief, and an open pediment. The windows are sashes with flat gauged arches, in the basement is a tripartite sash window, and the attic has a wide dormer. The steps and basement area have cast iron railings with shaped arrow heads. Inside, the original staircase survives.

== See also ==
- Grade II* listed buildings in North Yorkshire (district)
- Listed buildings in Scarborough (Castle Ward)
