= Listed buildings in Richmond, North Yorkshire (north and outer areas) =

Richmond is a civil parish in the county of North Yorkshire, England. It contains over 340 listed buildings that are recorded in the National Heritage List for England. Of these, four are listed at Grade I, the highest of the three grades, 17 are at Grade II*, the middle grade, and the others are at Grade II, the lowest grade. The parish contains the market town of Richmond and the surrounding countryside. Among the more important buildings in the parish are Richmond Castle, Holy Trinity Church, which has been largely converted into the Green Howards Regimental Museum, Greyfriars Tower, the remaining part of a medieval friary, and the Georgian Theatre Royal, a theatre that has been restored largely to its original state; all these are listed at Grade I.

Most of the other listed buildings are houses, cottages, shops, offices and associated structures, and the rest include churches and chapels, bridges, two remaining arches from the Town Walls, an almshouse, a warehouse, hotels and public houses, memorials, including two war memorials, a cross in the Market Place, remaining buildings on the former Richmond Racecourse, a water reservoir, school buildings, a former officers' quarters, and cobblestones on roadways.

This list contains the listed buildings in the northern part of the town and in the surrounding countryside. The listed buildings in the centre of the town can be found in Listed buildings in Richmond, North Yorkshire (central area).

== Key ==
Grade	Criteria
I	Buildings of exceptional interest, sometimes considered to be internationally important
II*	Particularly important buildings of more than special interest
II	Buildings of national importance and special interest

== Buildings ==
Name and location	Photograph	Date	Notes	Grade
St Mary's Church; 54.40476°N 1.73308°W		12th century	The church has been altered and extended through the centuries, including a restoration in 1857–60 by George Gilbert Scott, and further changes were made in 1892 by C. Hodgson Fowler. The church is built in sandstone with freestone dressings, and roofs mainly of slate. It consists of a nave with a clerestory, north and south aisles, north and south porches, a chancel with a north vestry, and a west tower. The tower has three stages, diagonal buttresses, a four-light west window, a clock face, two-light bell openings, and an embattled parapet.	II*
Archway in Town Walls; 54.40405°N 1.73791°W		c. 1312	The semicircular archway is in stone and is part of the original postern gate. It is set in a fragment of the original Town Walls.	II
Greyfriars Tower; 54.40471°N 1.73787°W		Late 15th century	The remains of the friary consist of a tower and parts of the ruined adjacent walls. The tower is in stone, and the lowest stage is open, with moulded pointed arches. Above, the bell openings have two lights and segmental heads, and at the top is an open stepped embattled parapet, with corner and central crocketed finials.	I
Walling with a coat of arms 54.40743°N 1.74909°W	—	16th century	The coat of arms of Richmond in a moulded stone frame built into a piece of walling on the south side of Westfields.	II
Willance's Leap; 54.41405°N 1.79220°W		1606	This consists of an upright stab with an inscription, which was renewed in 1815 and again in 1845.	II
The Eleanor Bowes Hospital; 54.40671°N 1.73076°W		1607	An almshouse incorporating the remains of a 12th-century chapel. It is in stone with a string course incorporating medallions, and has a stone slate roof with raised and coped gables, and shaped and carved kneelers. There is a single storey, and three bays divided by buttresses. On the south front are two doorways and windows, and in the east gable end is a blocked window with an ogee head. The west gable end has a panel in a moulded frame with a coat of arms. Extending to the south is a wall with a moulded cornice and a Tudor arched doorway.	II*
81 and 83 Frenchgate; 54.40589°N 1.73390°W		17th century (probable)	Two stuccoed houses with a stone slate roof. There are two storeys and two bays. The left house has two sash windows, and an archway to the right. On the right house is a bay window and a doorway to the right, and a sash window above.	II
5 and 7 Gallowgate; 54.40696°N 1.73384°W		17th century (probable)	A pair of houses in stone with a stone slate roof. There are two storeys and two bays. In the centre is a round-headed archway, and the windows are a mix, consisting of horizontally sliding sashes, one three-light casement window, and one modern window.	II
Hill House; 54.40687°N 1.73276°W		17th century	The house, which was refronted in the 18th century, is rendered. There are two storeys and seven bays, the middle three bays projecting under a pediment with a moulded band and two finials. The doorway has a moulded surround, a pulvinated frieze and a modillion cornice. On the ground floor are three large Venetian windows with Ionic mullions, and the other windows have moulded frames and sills. On the left is a single-storey extension, and there is a rear wing containing two doorways with moulded surrounds and triple keystones, and dormers.	II*
Oglethorpe House; 54.40671°N 1.73388°W		17th century	The house on a corner site, which was remodelled in the mid-19th century, is in stone, with quoins, floor bands, a cornice and a parapet. There are three storeys, a front of three bays, and three bays on the right return. The central doorway has a four-light fanlight, above it is a blocked window, and on the top floor is a sash window. The outer bays contain full height canted bay windows with Tuscan mullions, and on the right return are sash windows in stone surrounds.	II
St Nicholas; 54.40403°N 1.72366°W		17th century	The house is built on the site of a medieval hospital, it possibly incorporates earlier material, and was altered in the 19th century. It is in stone with quoins, a parapet and a stone slate roof. There are two storeys and an H-shaped plan, with a main range of three bays and projecting gabled single-bay cross-wings. In front of the main range is a colonnade of Tuscan columns and four-centred arches, above which is an openwork parapet. The windows are mullioned and transomed with hood moulds. To the right is a kitchen extension incorporating a medieval hospital gateway.	II
39 Frenchgate; 54.40433°N 1.73522°W		c. 1660	The house is roughcast, with chamfered rusticated quoins, a moulded stone cornice, and a parapet. There are three storeys and three bays. In the centre is a door with a traceried fanlight, and a porch with detached Roman Doric columns, an entablature and a pediment, and a triglyph frieze, which continues over the canted bay window to the right. The windows are sashes with stone surrounds.	II
89 Frenchgate; 54.40622°N 1.73381°W		17th or early 18th century	The cottage is rendered and has a pantile roof. There are two storeys and two bays. On the front is a doorway, and the windows are modern casements.	II
61 Frenchgate; 54.40526°N 1.73426°W		Early 18th century	The cottage is rendered and painted, and has a stone slate roof. There are two storeys and two bays. On the front are two doorways, and the windows are casements.	II
Gates and gate piers, Temple Grounds; 54.40382°N 1.74300°W		Early 18th century	The gateway was originally at the entrance to the grounds of York House, which has been demolished and replaced by Temple Lodge. The ornamental gates and the overthrow, which contains coats of arms, are in wrought iron. The gates are hung from ironwork pilasters on the gate piers. The piers are in stone and have four engaged columns, an entablature with an architrave, a pulvinated frieze, and a dentilled cornice, and are surmounted by a pineapple finial on a stepped pedestal.	II*
Culloden Tower; 54.40184°N 1.74414°W		1746	The tower, also known as The Temple, is in stone, with a square base, and an octagonal two-stage tower. The lower stage of the tower contains windows with pointed heads, above which is a blind arcade of pointed arches. The upper stage has alternate blind and glazed pointed windows, above which is a parapet with strapwork, and crocketed pinnacles at the angles. On the southwest corner is a stair turret with a small domed top.	II*
The Grove; 54.40422°N 1.73539°W		1750	A large house in red brick, with chamfered stone quoins, a moulded stone cornice, brick parapets with stone capping, and a slate roof. There are three storeys, a main block of five bays, and a recessed single-bay extension on the left. In the centre of the main block is a doorway with a moulded surround, a pulvinated frieze and a cornice. This is flanked by large semicircular bow windows, and the other windows on the main block are sashes with moulded stone frames. On the extension are three-light windows with rusticated keystones, and at the rear is a Venetian window.	II*
2 Flints Yard; 54.40609°N 1.73547°W		18th century	The house is in stone, with its gable end facing the road. There are three storeys and two bays. On the left bay is a doorway with a moulded surround, and a passage doorway immediately to its left. The windows are sashes with moulded sills; one small window on the extreme right is horizontally sliding. Apart from this window, all the openings have moulded lintels and keystones.	II
15 Flints Yard; 54.40591°N 1.73411°W		18th century	The house is in two parts, the left part higher, and is in painted roughcast with a pantile roof. There are two storeys, and it contains a doorway with a trellis porch, and windows of various types.	II
6 Frenchgate; 54.40340°N 1.73557°W		Mid-18th century	The house is in painted roughcast with a pantile roof. There are three storeys and three bays. The doorway in the left bay has a blocked fanlight, in the centre bay of the middle floor is a bay window, and the other windows are sashes. All the openings, except for the bay window, have stone surrounds and rusticated keystones.	II
7 Frenchgate; 54.40324°N 1.73606°W		18th century	Two rendered shops with a Welsh slate roof, stone coped gables and kneelers. There are two storeys and four bays. The ground floor contains a shop window with pilasters and a cornice on the left, in the centre is a doorway with a stone surround, moulded jambs, and a keystone, and to the right is a shopfront with a doorway on the left. The upper floors contain sash and casement windows.	II
15 Frenchgate; 54.40338°N 1.73582°W		18th century	The building is rendered on a stepped plinth, and has a pantile roof. There are three storeys and two bays. The ground floor contains a small shopfront and two small shop windows with sashes, all with pilasters and entablatures, the doorway in an architrave. On the upper floors are casement windows.	II
17 Frenchgate; 54.40344°N 1.73576°W		18th century	The shop is roughcast, and has a Welsh slate roof. There are three storeys and two bays. On the ground floor is a 19th-century shopfront with pilasters, to the right is a doorway with pilasters and an architrave, and there is a fascia over both. The upper floors contain sash windows in stone surrounds, those on the top floor horizontally sliding.	II
20 and 22 Frenchgate; 54.40467°N 1.73433°W		Mid-18th century	The house is in stone with a Welsh slate roof. There are two storeys, three bays, and a narrow lower bay to the left. In the centre is a doorway, and there is another doorway with a plain stone surround in the left bay. The main doorway and the windows, which are sashes, have stone surrounds and rusticated keystones.	II
24 Frenchgate; 54.40476°N 1.73429°W		Mid-18th century or earlier	The house is in painted roughcast, and has a slate roof. There are two storeys and two bays. The central doorway has a small hood on iron brackets, the windows are sashes, and on the roof are two sloped dormers.	II
25 and 27 Frenchgate; 54.40372°N 1.73547°W		Mid-18th century	Two shops in stone, with three storeys and three bays. On the ground floor, to the left, is a 19th-century shopfront, to its right is a doorway with a segmental head and a keystone, and further to the right are a shop window and another doorway. The upper floors contain sash windows with segmental heads and keystones.	II
30 Frenchgate; 54.40497°N 1.73409°W		Mid-18th century	The house is rendered and painted, and has a stone eaves cornice and a slate roof. There are two storeys and two bays. Steps lead down to the doorway on the right that has a stone surround and a small hood. To its left is a sash window and a bow window. The upper floor contains sash windows, and on the roof are two gabled dormers.	II
31 and 33 Frenchgate; 54.40397°N 1.73531°W		Mid-18th century	The house is rendered, on a plinth to the left, and has a stone slate roof. There are two storeys and three bays. Four steps lead up to the doorway, the windows are sashes, and all the openings have rusticated keystones.	II
34 Frenchgate; 54.40506°N 1.73397°W		Mid-18th century	The house is roughcast, on a stone plinth, with a slate roof. There are three storeys and two bays. On the right bay is a projecting porch with Ionic columns, a frieze with a guilloché pattern, and a modillion cornice, and a door with a semicircular fanlight containing Gothic tracery. The windows are sashes.	II
36 Frenchgate; 54.40532°N 1.73390°W		18th century	A large house in stone, with chamfered quoins, a string course, and a stone-capped parapet. There are three storeys and seven bays, the left two bays and the right bay projecting slightly. On the main block is a doorcase with engaged columns, an architrave, a frieze with two wreaths and a moulded cornice, and a doorway with a segmental traceried fanlight. On the left bay is a doorway with a rusticated surround, and a panelled lintel with a keystone. The windows are sashes in moulded frames.	II
41A and 41B Frenchgate; 54.40438°N 1.73507°W		Mid-18th century	The house is roughcast and colourwashed, on a stone plinth, with chamfered rusticated quoins, and a stone eaves cornice. There are three storeys and three bays. In the centre is a doorway in a blocked segmental arch. The right bay contains a flat-arched entrance, above which is a French window with a balcony, and the other windows are sashes.	II
43 Frenchgate; 54.40450°N 1.73490°W		18th century	The house is in roughcast stone on a stone plinth, with three storeys and five bays. Steps with railings approach the central doorway with reeded pilasters and a cornice. To its left is a recessed four-light window, the middle floor contains two balconies with French doors, and the other windows are sashes.	II
48 Frenchgate; 54.40576°N 1.73363°W		Mid-18th century	A small house in stone with a Welsh slate roof. There are two storeys and two bays. The central doorway has a rectangular fanlight, and the windows are sashes.	II
55 Frenchgate; 54.40502°N 1.73446°W		Mid-18th century	The house is in red brick on a stone plinth, with stone quoins and a stone slate roof. There are three storeys and three bays. The doorway in the right bay has a stone surround and a two-light rectangular fanlight. The windows are sashes with moulded frames and gauged brick arches.	II
58 Frenchgate; 54.40605°N 1.73350°W		Mid-18th century	The house is in stone with alternate quoins and a pantile roof. There are three storeys and two bays. The central doorway has engaged columns, a rectangular fanlight, a reeded frieze and a small cornice. The windows are sashes with stone surrounds.	II
60 Frenchgate; 54.40616°N 1.73349°W		18th century	The house is in red brick with a slate roof. There are three storeys and two bays. The central doorway has a moulded stone surround, with shaped jambs and shoulders, a shaped and reeded frieze, and a dentilled cornice. It is flanked by two-storey canted bay windows, each with a rendered riser, a reeded frieze and a dentilled cornice. The top floor contains sash windows. To the left is a wall containing a round-arched doorway with a keystone and a small blocked window.	II
63 Frenchgate; 54.40531°N 1.73421°W		Mid-18th century	The house is rendered and painted, it is on a plinth, and has a stone slate roof. There are three storeys and two bays. The doorway in the left bay has a plain stone surround and a pediment, and the windows are sashes.	II
69 Frenchgate; 54.40552°N 1.73412°W		Mid-18th century	The house is in stone on a plinth, with a Welsh slate roof. Thee are two storeys and three bays. The central doorway has a moulded shouldered frame and a rectangular fanlight. To its left is a canted bay window, and the other windows are sashes in moulded stone frames.	II
71 Frenchgate; 54.40558°N 1.73408°W		Mid-18th century	The cottage is in stone with a pantile roof. There are two storeys and two bays. The doorway in the right bay has a rendered surround. To its left is a canted bay window, and the windows on the upper floor are sashes in rendered surrounds.	II
73 Frenchgate; 54.40564°N 1.73405°W		Mid-18th century	The cottage is roughcast and has a pantile roof. There are two storeys and two bays. The left bay contains a plain doorway, to its right is a modern window, and on the upper floor are horizontally sliding sash windows.	II
75 Frenchgate; 54.40573°N 1.73399°W		Mid-18th century	The cottage is in rendered stone with a Welsh slate roof. There are two storeys and three bays. The central doorway has a wooden surround and a pediment. It is flanked by bowed oriel windows, and the upper floor contains horizontally sliding sashes.	II
87 Frenchgate; 54.40611°N 1.73387°W		Mid-18th century	The house is in stone with a slate roof. There are three storeys and three bays. Steps lead up to the central doorway with a rectangular fanlight, the windows are sashes, and all the openings have stone surrounds and rusticated keystones.	II
91 Frenchgate; 54.40630°N 1.73389°W		Mid-18th century	The house is in stone, and has a Welsh slate roof with stone coped gables and kneelers. There are three storeys and two bays. The doorway in the left bay has a plain surround and a rectangular fanlight. The right bay contains a two-storey canted bay window with clustered column mullions, and the other windows are sashes with stone surrounds.	II
2 Gallowgate; 54.40688°N 1.73381°W		18th century (probable)	The house is in stone with a Welsh slate roof. There are two storeys and two bays. In the left bay is a passage archway, and the windows are sashes. Over the archway and the ground floor window is a continuous lintel.	II
1–11 Maison Dieu; 54.40645°N 1.73118°W		18th century	A row of six cottages in stone, mostly rendered, with roofs of Welsh slate, stone slate and pantile. The left cottage has one storey and its gable end facing the street, and the others have two storeys. Each cottage has a doorway, and near the centre is a passage entry. Most of the windows are sashes, and there are some modern windows.	II
12 Maison Dieu; 54.40630°N 1.73119°W		Mid-18th century	The house is in stone with a stone slate roof. There are two storeys and two bays. The doorway has a rectangular fanlight, and to its left is a square window, both under cambered brick arches. The other windows are sashes, those in the right bay tripartite.	II
13 Maison Dieu; 54.40640°N 1.73088°W		18th century	The house is in stone and has a Welsh slate roof. There are two storeys and two bays. On the front is a doorway and a nine-pane window to the right, and the other windows are sashes.	II
16 Maison Dieu; 54.40625°N 1.73096°W		18th century (or earlier)	The cottage is in stone and has a roof of pantile with two courses of stone slates at the eaves. There are two storeys and two bays. The doorway is on the right, and the windows are sashes; the ground floor window is tripartite.	II
4 Pottergate; 54.40624°N 1.73530°W		Mid-18th century	The house is in stone, on a ramped plinth, with stone quoins and some brick dressings, all rendered. There are three storeys and three bays. The central doorway has a round-headed stone architrave with a keystone. The windows are sashes with keystones.	II
12 Queens Road; 54.40530°N 1.73634°W		Mid-18th century	A house, later offices, in stone on a plinth, with a floor band, and a hipped stone slate roof. There are two storeys, a main block of three bays, and a lower recessed single-bay extension on the left. The middle bay of the main block projects slightly under a pediment, and contains a doorway with shaped jambs, a divided fanlight, a pulvinated frieze with a panel, and a dentilled cornice, and above it is a semicircular window. The other windows are sashes in moulded frames, those on the ground floor also with a pulvinated frieze and a cornice.	II
7 Rosemary Lane; 54.40410°N 1.73939°W		18th century	The building is roughcast, and has a pantile roof. There are two storeys and two wide bays. The ground floor contains a modern shopfront, and on the upper floors are sash windows in stone surrounds.	II
8 Rosemary Lane; 54.40404°N 1.73918°W		18th century	The shop is rendered and has a stone slate roof. There are three storeys and two bays. The ground floor contains a shopfront with pilasters, and a doorway to the left with a rectangular fanlight, all under one entablature. On the upper floors are sash windows with moulded stone surrounds.	II
7 and 8 Westfields; 54.40556°N 1.74516°W		18th century	Two houses in rendered stone with a Welsh slate roof and two storeys. The right house has three bays, the middle bay slightly projecting under a pediment, flanked by quoins, and containing a doorway with a stone surround. The left house has two bays and a central doorway with a three-light rectangular fanlight. The windows in both houses are sashes.	II
Garden wall, gates and gate piers, Hill House; 54.40671°N 1.73251°W	—	18th century	The gates are in wrought iron, and are flanked by rusticated stone gate piers with ball finials. The garden is enclosed by a stone wall that is ramped up to the piers, and contains later openings.	II*
Pear Tree House; 54.40639°N 1.73333°W		18th century	The house is in stone with a stone slate roof. There are three storeys and three bays. The central doorway has a shaped surround, a rectangular fanlight, and an open pedimented hood on shaped brackets.	II
Prior House; 54.40680°N 1.73927°W	—	18th century	A large house, later used for other purposes, in stone, with quoins, floor bands, and a slate roof. There are two storeys and five bays, and to the right is a three-storey two-bay roughcast wing. In the centre of the entrance front is a tall round-headed window, a porch with reeded engaged Tuscan columns, a reeded frieze with panels, and a dentilled cornice, and a door with a semicircular fanlight. The garden front has a moulded cornice, a small parapet and central pediment. The windows are sashes in moulded surrounds; those on the ground floor are full-length, and the central window has been converted into a modern door.	II
Rosemary Cottage; 54.40426°N 1.73934°W		18th century	The office is in stone, and has two storeys and attics, and two bays. On the ground floor is a shop window with fluted pilasters, and to the right is a doorway that has an architrave with shaped and moulded jambs, a fluted frieze and a cornice. Above are sash windows; those in the attic are half-dormers with gables, carved bargeboards and finials.	II
Swale House; 54.40363°N 1.73518°W		18th century	The house, which was later extended to the right, is in stone, with quoins, a moulded cornice, a blocking course, and a Welsh slate roof. There are three storeys, three original bays, and three bays on the extension. On the original part is a later modern porch, and sash windows with plain frames and triple keystones. In the centre of the extension is a doorway, and sash windows, all with rusticated keystones. On the roof of the later part are two gabled dormers with carved bargeboards.	II
The Friary; 54.40496°N 1.73834°W		18th century	A large house incorporating older material, it is roughcast, with a moulded stone eaves cornice. The main range has three storeys and seven bays, there is an extension of 1898 to the right, and modern additions at the rear. The doorway at the extreme left has reeded pilasters forming brackets, a semicircular fanlight, a reeded frieze and a cornice with small modillions. The windows are sashes, and on the extension is a canted bay window.	II
The Turf Hotel; 54.40417°N 1.73769°W		18th century	The public house, which was extended to the right probably in the 19th century, is in rendered stone, both parts with two storeys and three bays. The left part has a Welsh slate roof and a parapet. It contains a doorway with a plain surround, and a flat hood on consoles. The right part has a stone slate roof and a plain doorway. The windows in both parts are sashes, those on the ground floor with three lights.	II
Unicorn Hotel and 1 and 3 Rosemary Lane; 54.40387°N 1.73960°W		18th century (or earlier)	A pub and two shops on a corner site, they are rendered, and have a Welsh slate roof and two storeys. The public house has three bays, the left bay slightly taller. On the left bay is a round-arched doorway with a semicircular fanlight and a keystone. The windows are sashes, two on the upper floor horizontally-sliding. On Rosemary Lane are two shopfronts and a doorway to the right, and on the upper floor are three sash windows.	II
York House; 54.40313°N 1.73588°W		18th century	The shop is in painted stucco, with rusticated quoins and a stone slate roof. There are three storeys and five bays. The central doorway has a moulded shouldered surround, a rectangular fanlight, a pulvinated frieze and a small cornice. The windows are sashes with stone surrounds and rusticated keystones; two on the top floor are blocked.	II
Minden House; 54.40496°N 1.73409°W		c. 1759	The house is in stone with chamfered quoins, a floor band and a slate roof. There are three storeys and three bays. On the right bay is a projecting porch with Doric columns, a triglyph frieze, and a pediment with mutules, and the door has a semicircular fanlight. The windows are sashes with moulded surrounds.	II
Temple Lodge; 54.40396°N 1.74369°W	—	1769	The house, which was extended in the 19th century, is in stone, with an embattled parapet and a Welsh slate roof. There are two storeys, a main range, and five-bay wings with arcades on quatrefoil piers. The windows are sashes, most with ogee heads.	II
Moor Cottage (High Lodge); 54.41303°N 1.75759°W		c. 1775	The former lodge at the entry to Richmond Racecourse is in stone with a hipped slate roof. There are two storeys and two bays. On the front is a porch and round-arched windows.	II
Old Grand Stand; 54.41491°N 1.75544°W		c. 1775	The grandstand in the former Richmond Racecourse is in stone, and has a large rectangular plan. On the ground floor are five round-headed arches, with a Tuscan arcade in front, above which is a balcony with railings. On the upper storey are round-headed windows, and above is a flat roof with a balustraded parapet.	II*
31A Frenchgate; 54.40387°N 1.73539°W		Late 18th century	The house is roughcast and has a slate roof. There are three storeys and three bays. Steps lead up to the central doorway that has a three-pane fanlight. It is flanked by bow windows, and the upper floors contain sash windows.	II
47–53 Frenchgate; 54.40491°N 1.73455°W		Late 18th century	A terrace of rendered houses on a high stone plinth, with a roof of slate and stone slate. There are two storeys and basements, and ten bays. Flights of steps, three with iron handrails, lead up to the doorways that have stone surrounds, and fanlights, one with Gothic tracery. The windows are sashes in moulded frames.	II
65 and 67 Frenchgate; 54.40538°N 1.73418°W		Late 18th century	The house is rendered, on a stone plinth, and has a Welsh slate roof with kneelers. There are three storeys and three bays. The central doorway has a stone surround and a broken pediment on consoles. This is flanked by canted bay windows, and the other windows are sashes in moulded stone frames.	II
28 Maison Dieu; 54.40612°N 1.73058°W		Late 18th century	The house is in stone with a stone slate roof. There are two storeys and three bays. The central doorway has a stone surround, pilasters and a semicircular radial fanlight. The windows are sashes, the window over the doorway with a round head, and the others with flat arches of voussoirs.	II
30 Maison Dieu; 54.40609°N 1.73046°W		Late 18th century	The house is in stone with a stone slate roof. There are two storeys and a basement, and three bays. Steps lead up to the central doorway that has pilasters, a fanlight with Gothic glazing under a basket arch, and a keystone. The windows are sashes with flat arches of voussoirs.	II
9 Rosemary Lane; 54.40420°N 1.73935°W		Late 18th century	The office is rendered, on a stone plinth, and has a stone slate roof. There are three storeys and three bays. The ground floor contains a shopfront, and to the right is a doorway with moulded jambs, a fluted frieze and a cornice. On the upper floors are sash windows.	II
1–8 Temple Square; 54.40427°N 1.74292°W		Late 18th century	A group of eight houses in three ranges around a courtyard. They are in stone with hipped stone slate roofs, and two storeys. The main range contains two houses, and has doorways with four-pane fanlights and small hoods in the outer parts, sash windows and central blocked windows. The side ranges each has three houses, with plain doorways and small-paned casement windows.	II
5–7 Temple Terrace; 54.40414°N 1.74346°W		Late 18th century	A row of thee cottages in stone, the middle one rendered, with a stone slate roof. There are two storeys, and each cottage has three bays. The doorways are in the centre of the cottages, and have a stone surround and a rectangular fanlight. Most of the windows are sashes, some are blocked, and the middle cottage has two modern mullioned and transomed windows on the ground floor.	II
7 Victoria Road; 54.40404°N 1.73883°W		Late 18th century	The building is in stone on a plinth, with rusticated quoins and a stone slate roof. There are two storeys and one bay. In the centre is a large round-arched doorway with rusticated jambs, a moulded surround, an impost band and a keystone. The upper floor contains a large Venetian window with a moulded surround.	II
East Applegarth; 54.41060°N 1.79537°W	—	Late 18th century	A small stone farmhouse with a stone slate roof. There are two storeys and two bays, and a catslide extension to the rear. The windows are sashes, those on the upper floor with stone voussoirs.	II
Friary Lodge; 54.40449°N 1.73897°W		Late 18th century	The house is in stone, with three storeys and three bays. The doorway in the left bay has a moulded stone frame and a rectangular fanlight. The windows are sashes in moulded frames.	II
Rookery Neuk; 54.40652°N 1.73103°W	—	Late 18th century (probable)	Two cottages, later combined, the western one dating probably from the early 19th century, and both with pantile roofs. The eastern cottage is rendered and has two storeys and one bay, and contains a doorway and a four-pane window above. The western cottage is taller, in stone, with quoins, two storeys and two bays. The doorway is on the right and the windows are sashes.	II
Silvio House; 54.40631°N 1.74365°W		Late 18th century	The house is in stone, and has a stone slate roof with kneelers. There are two storeys and three bays. The central doorway has a shouldered surround, a divided fanlight, a pulvinated frieze and a modillion cornice, and above it is a decorative sundial. The outer bays contain sash windows with stone surrounds and rusticated keystones. To the left is a stable converted into a cottage.	II
Gates, gate piers and walling, The Friary; 54.40459°N 1.73884°W	—	Late 18th century	The gate piers are in stone, and between them are 19th-century iron gates. To the west is a small piece of stone walling lined with brick.	II
Georgian Theatre Royal; 54.40415°N 1.73799°W		1788	The theatre, which has been restored to its original state, is in stone with quoins, a stone slate roof, and a rectangular plan. Inside is a rectangular auditorium, a sunk and sloping pit, a row of boxes divided by Doric columns, and a gallery on three sides above. The proscenium has two side doors and two balconies above, and the stage has three traps.	I
4 and 6 Anchorage Hill; 54.40659°N 1.73083°W		Late 18th or early 19th century	Two houses in stone with Welsh slate roofs. The left house has a rendered front, three storeys and two bays. The central doorway has pilasters, and a flat hood on carved console brackets. The left house is a similar height, with two storeys and three bays. In the centre are paired doorways, above which is a blind window. Over this window is a carved medieval head, and under it is a coat of arms. The other windows in both houses are sashes.	II
1 Flints Yard; 54.40614°N 1.73546°W		Late 18th or early 19th century	The house is in stone, and has a slate roof. There are three storeys and two bays. The doorway on the left has an elliptical head, a fanlight and a keystone. The windows are sashes with moulded frames and flat stone arches.	II
11 and 13 Frenchgate; 54.40333°N 1.73591°W		Late 18th or early 19th century	The building is rendered and has a stone slate roof. There are three storeys and two bays. The left bay contains a doorway with thin pilasters and an entablature, and to its left is a modern window. On the right bay is a 19th-century shopfront, and the upper floors contain sash windows.	II
19 Frenchgate; 54.40351°N 1.73573°W		Late 18th or early 19th century	The shop is roughcast with some brick, the ground floor is rendered, and it has a pantile roof. There are three storeys and two bays. The ground floor contains a 19th-century shop window with an entablature, and to the right is a blocked doorway with pilasters, an entablature and a cornice. On the upper floors are sash windows with cemented surrounds.	II
1 Gallowgate; 54.40684°N 1.73380°W		18th or early 19th century	The house is in stone with a stone slate roof. There are two storeys and one bay. The doorway is on the right, the windows are sashes, and all the openings have brick voussoirs.	II
8 Pottergate; 54.40632°N 1.73503°W		Late 18th or early 19th century	The house is in red brick on a stone plinth, with stone quoins. There are three storeys and one bay. The main doorway on the left has engaged Tuscan columns, a rectangular fanlight, a frieze and a moulded cornice. The windows are sashes. On the right is a doorway with pilasters and a rectangular fanlight.	II
Frenchgate House; 54.40455°N 1.73449°W		Late 18th or early 19th century	The house is roughcast and rendered, on a stone plinth, with stone quoins, a moulded cornice, and a hipped Welsh slate roof. There are two storeys and three bays, the middle bay projecting under a moulded pediment. The central doorway has a stone surround, pilasters and a cornice. The windows are sashes with moulded stone surrounds, and above are flat-headed dormers.	II
Wall, Cravengate; 54.40217°N 1.74209°W		18th or early 19th century	The high stone wall extends along the west side of Cravengate.	II
Wellington House; 54.40598°N 1.74268°W		Late 18th or early 19th century	The house is in stone with a sill band. There are three storeys and five bays, the outer bays projecting slightly, and flanking two-storey one-bay wings. The central doorway has engaged columns, a fanlight, a moulded cornice, a plain frieze, and a smaller cornice above. The windows are sashes, some are tripartite, and those on the ground floor are round-headed in recessed round-headed arches joined by bands.	II
Aislabeck Reservoir; 54.41374°N 1.76807°W	—	1812	The water reservoir is in stone. The only visible part is a wall on a plinth, with an iron spout, and a stone basin with iron grating. Above the spout is a rectangular opening with an iron shutter, and around the spout are inscribed stones.	II
Judge's Box; 54.41346°N 1.75529°W		1814	The building on the former Richmond Racecourse is in stone with a shallow pyramidal stone slate roof. There is one storey on a basement, and a rectangular plan. On each face is a window; the window on the north face is a bow window with a plain frieze. On the building is an inscribed and dated iron plaque.	II
1 and 2 Anchorage Hill; 54.40656°N 1.73127°W		Early 19th century (or earlier)	The two houses each has two storeys. No. 2, on the left, has a Welsh slate roof, two bays, a central doorway and casement windows. The right house is taller and has two parts, each with two bays. The left part has a gabled porch with bargeboards on the left, sash windows on the ground floor and casements above. The right part is taller, with a pantile roof, and has a central doorway approached by steps with pilasters and a hood on consoles, and the windows are sashes.	II
1–5 Frenchgate; 54.40321°N 1.73620°W		Early 19th century	The shops are rendered and have a Welsh slate roof. There are four storeys and two bays. The ground floor contains two shopfronts, one with a cornice on carved consoles, and on the upper floors are sash windows.	II
9 Frenchgate; 54.40327°N 1.73602°W		Early 19th century	The shop is rendered and has a Welsh slate roof. There are three storeys and one bay. The ground floor contains a shopfront with pilasters, architraves and an entablature. There is a sash window in a moulded surround on each upper floor, and on the middle floor is a small modern window.	II
1 and 3 Hurgill Road; 54.40467°N 1.74205°W		Early 19th century	A pair of stone houses in stone with a pantile roof. There are two storeys and each house has two bays. Both houses have a doorcase with engaged Tuscan columns and an entablature. The right house has two canted bay windows, and the other windows are sashes.	II
5 and 7 Hurgill Road; 54.40483°N 1.74205°W	—	Early 19th century	A pair of rendered houses, with a band between the two storeys. The windows are sashes.	II
9 Hurgill Road; 54.40484°N 1.74195°W	—	Early 19th century	The house is in rendered stone, and has a stone slate roof. There are two storeys and two bays. The doorway has pilasters, a deep frieze, and a moulded cornice.	II
11 Hurgill Road; 54.40486°N 1.74181°W	—	Early 19th century	The house is in stone and has a roof with kneelers. There are three storeys and three bays. The doorway has Tuscan columns, a panelled frieze, and a moulded cornice on modillions. The windows are sashes with stone surrounds.	II
11a Hurgill Road; 54.40492°N 1.74175°W		Early 19th century	The house is rendered, with quoins, and its gable end facing the road. There are three storeys and two bays. The doorway has fluted pilasters, a rectangular fanlight and a pediment. On the middle floor, to the right, is an oriel window, and the other windows are sashes.	II
10–14 Victoria Road; 54.40463°N 1.74272°W		Early 19th century	A row of three stone houses, the right two houses rendered, and all with a stone slate roof. There are two storeys and eight bays. The two right houses have a doorway with a rectangular fanlight, a frieze and a small cornice, and the left house doorway has a plain surround. The windows are sashes, and the left house has a garage door.	II
18–26 Victoria Road; 54.40467°N 1.74335°W		Early 19th century	A terrace of five stone houses with chamfered rusticated quoins. There are three storeys and each house has two bays. The doorways have pilasters, and each has a rectangular fanlight, a frieze and a cornice forming a hood, and there is a passage door. The windows are sashes with wedge lintels, and some doorways has inset boot scrapers.	II
28 Victoria Road; 54.40473°N 1.74361°W		Early 19th century	The house is in stone with a stone slate roof. There are two storeys and two bays. The central doorway has an architrave, pilasters, a frieze and a cornice. To its right is a shop window, above is a bowed oriel window, and the left bay contains sash windows.	II
1–6 Westfields; 54.40541°N 1.74489°W		Early 19th century	A terrace of six stone houses with quoins and a slate roof. There are two storeys and 14 bays, curved at one point. The doorways have moulded stone surrounds and rectangular fanlights. The windows are sashes in moulded stone surrounds, and the roof contains skylights and a single dormer.	II
Garden Cottage; 54.40259°N 1.74271°W		Early 19th century (probable)	The cottage is in stone, with some brick, and has a pantile roof with coped gables. There are two storeys, and most of the windows are sashes. The cottage incorporates two 18th-century stone archways, one with a keystone and moulded capitals, and the other with moulded capitals and a rusticated keystone. It also includes two stone pyramids from 18th-century gate piers.	II
Howe Villa; 54.40417°N 1.75345°W	—	Early 19th century	The house, later converted into flats, is in stone, with a moulded eaves cornice, a hipped slate roof, and three storeys. At the entrance is a Tuscan portico with a plain frieze, a moulded cornice, and moulded stone steps. Its windows include a tall round-headed stair window.	II
Ivy Lodge; 54.40450°N 1.74209°W		Early 19th century	The house is rendered and has a hipped pantile roof. There are two storeys and two bays. The doorway has a plain surround and a radiating fanlight, and the windows are sashes, two on the ground floor with round-arched heads.	II
Pottergate House; 54.40621°N 1.73539°W		Early 19th century	The house is in stone with chamfered rusticated quoins, with a moulded eaves cornice, and a slate roof. There are three storeys and three bays. The central doorway has Tuscan columns, a traceried fanlight, a plain frieze and a cornice. The windows are sashes, in moulded frames.	II
Doorway, Temple Lodge; 54.40387°N 1.74307°W		Early 19th century	The doorway at the entrance to the grounds of Temple Lodge is in stone with timber doors, and is formed from two blocks. The outer face has a four-centred arch with a hood mould, and above it is a crow-stepped pediment with a cornice.	II
Former Victoria Hospital; 54.40620°N 1.73631°W		Early 19th century	The hospital, later used for other purposes, is in stone with quoins, a floor band, an embattled parapet, and a tile roof. There are two storeys and three bays, the middle bay projecting under a pediment. The central doorway and the windows all have pointed heads, Gothic glazing, and hood moulds.	II
34 Maison Dieu; 54.40596°N 1.72991°W		Early to mid-19th century	The house is in stone with a hipped Welsh slate roof. There are two storeys, three bays, and a single bay on the left under a catslide roof. The central doorway has a stepped lintel with a keystone. The windows are sashes with slightly cambered heads.	II
5 Rosemary Lane; 54.40401°N 1.73947°W		Early to mid-19th century	The shop is in stone with a slate roof. There are three storeys and three bays. The ground floor contains a shopfront with panelled pilasters, and a fascia extending over a doorway on the left. On the right is a doorway with pilasters and a cornice, and the upper floors contain sash windows.	II
Frenchgate Hotel; 54.40518°N 1.73429°W		Early to mid-19th century	The hotel is in stone and has a stone slate roof with stone kneelers. There are three storeys and four bays. The doorway has a moulded surround, a rectangular fanlight and a keystone, and the windows are sashes.	II
Station Bridge; 54.40396°N 1.73082°W		Early to mid-19th century	The bridge, also known as Mercury Bridge, carries the A6136 road over the River Swale. It is in stone, and consists of four pointed segmental arches, with cutwaters and a decorative parapet.	II
Lownethwaite Bridge; 54.40150°N 1.77622°W		1836	The bridge carries Reeth Road (A6108 road) over the River Swale. It is in stone, and consists of five segmental arches on pointed cutwaters. The bridge has a band, and a parapet with segmental coping.	II
Zetland House; 54.40645°N 1.73383°W		1840	The house is in stone on a high plinth, with chamfered quoins, a floor band, a moulded eaves cornice, and a hipped slate roof. There are two storeys and a basement, and three bays. The central doorway has a moulded surround and a semicircular traceried fanlight. The windows are sashes with stone surrounds, and in front of the house is a terrace with iron railings.	II
Former Grammar School Buildings; 54.40420°N 1.73292°W		1849	The grammar school was designed by G. T. Andrews, it was enlarged in 1865–67, and again in the 20th century. The original building consists of a two-storey hall with two protruding wings, cloakrooms and a staircase. The later extension is a two-storey hall at right angles, and between them is a bell tower. The latest additions are in single storey and are plainer.	II
27 Victoria Road and school buildings 54.40446°N 1.74253°W		c. 1850	The house and schoolrooms at the rear are in stone and have slate roofs with coped gables. The house has two storeys and two bays. The central doorway has a chamfered surround and a narrow fanlight. It is flanked by three-light mullioned windows, and above are two-light mullioned windows in gabled dormers. The schoolroom has two storeys and three bays. On the ground floor are two-light windows with pointed arches, and above are paired sash windows with shouldered surrounds. To the left is a square stair tower with a pyramidal roof.	II
16 Victoria Road; 54.40465°N 1.74310°W		19th century	The house is in stone, with chamfered rusticated quoins on the right, and a roof with a kneeler. There are two storeys and three bays. The central doorway has pilasters, a rectangular fanlight, a frieze and a cornice, above it is a sundial, and the windows are sashes.	II
Bargate House; 54.40317°N 1.74059°W		Mid-19th century	The house is in red brick with bracketed eaves and a Welsh slate roof. There are two storeys and three bays. Steps lead up to the central doorway that has a moulded stone surround and a rectangular fanlight. This is flanked by canted bay windows with pilasters and a cornice, the lights with elliptical heads. The top floor contains sash windows, and on the extreme right is a smaller doorway with a stone surround.	II
Golden Lion Hotel; 54.40271°N 1.73782°W		Mid-19th century	The public house is in painted brick and has a Welsh slate roof. There are two storeys and three bays. The central doorway has a plain surround and a rectangular fanlight. The windows on the upper floor are sashes, and on the ground floor are multi-pane windows with moulded stone surrounds.	II
Government Offices; 54.40361°N 1.74062°W		Mid-19th century	The building, on a corner site, is in stone, with rusticated quoins, a floor band, and a hipped Welsh slate roof. There are two storeys, five bays on the front and two on the left return. The doorway in the right bay has a four-centred arched head and a hood mould. The windows are sashes, the ground floor windows on the front under brick relieving arches.	II
Ship Inn; 54.40633°N 1.73381°W		Mid-19th century or earlier	The public house is rendered, and has a Welsh slate roof. There are two storeys and attics, and two bays. On the ground floor is a canted bay window and to the right is a doorway. The upper floor contains sash windows in moulded surrounds, and above are two gabled half-dormers with bargeboards.	II
Former York County Savings Bank; 54.40323°N 1.73569°W		1851	The building is in stone on a plinth, the ground floor rusticated, with a sill band, a blocking course, and a dentilled cornice, under which is a lettered and dated tablet. There are two storeys, a main block of seven bays, and a slightly lower, slightly recessed, bay on the right. The upper floor windows have round heads, pilaster jambs, and keystones, and between them are pilasters with swags at the top. The ground floor windows and doorways have carved segmental heads. In the right bay is a round-arched carriage entry, and the window above has a shouldered architrave.	II
Former Officer's quarters 54.41160°N 1.73245°W	—	1874–75	The officers' quarters and mess, later converted into flats, is in stone with slate roofs. It has a double-depth axial L-shaped plan, with two storeys and ten bays. There is a single-storey canted mess room, and an open porch with a hipped roof and a lead finial. Most of the windows are sashes.	II
Former Zetland Cocoa Rooms; 54.40399°N 1.73748°W		1879–89	The building on a corner site, later used for other purposes, is in limestone on a plinth, with quoins, sill bands, a dentilled eaves cornice, and an overhanging hipped Welsh slate roof. There are two storeys, three bays on the King Street front, and two on the right return. Each bay contains a full height bay window with a flat front and curved sides. The lower window has a sunrise-pattern upper light and a 12-pane lower light. Above it is a dentilled cornice, a scrolled pediment, and a panel with a double festoon. The upper windows are cross mullioned, and in each floor, the side lights are curved. The entrance on King Street has a porch with an ornate canopy on shaped brackets with a dentilled cornice, and above it is a decorative wrought iron sign surmounted by a crown.	II
The Fleece Hotel; 54.40409°N 1.73831°W		1897	The hotel is in brick and terracotta, and has a tile roof with crow-stepped gables and ceramic bowed oriel turrets with arrow slits and round pointed roofs. There are four storeys and five bays, the outer bays recessed. The central entrance has a porch with a four-centred arch flanked by ceramic round turrets, machicolated and embattled with a parapet containing a coat of arms, above which is a sash window and an oriel window. The flanking bays contain two-storey bow windows with embattled balconies. Elsewhere, there are sash windows, and in the right bay is a carriage entrance with a four-centred arch.	II
Green Howards War Memorial, steps, piers and railings 54.40651°N 1.73353°W		1921	The war memorial of the Green Howards Regiment is in an enclosure by the side of the road. It is in stone, and consists of a Celtic cross with a shaft, both decorated with interlace carving in low relief, and dated collars at the base, standing on a square pedestal carrying inscriptions. The cross is on a platform at the top of a long flight of steps, with stone corner piers and metal railings. In front are inscribed stone panels forming planters.	II
Richmond war memorial 54.40458°N 1.73764°W		1921	The war memorial, in Friary Gardens, is in Staindrop stone, and consists of a small equal-armed cross rising from a moulded collar on an octagonal shaft. This stands on three steps on a tall octagonal base on a step set into a retaining wall flanking the cross. On the base is an inscription and the names of those lost in the First World War, and on the retaining wall are bronze plaques with the names of those lost in the Second World War.	II
Girls' High School, Richmond School; 54.40624°N 1.72531°W	—	1938–39	The school is in reinforced concrete enclosed by stone walls and rendered panels, and it has a flat roof. At the entrance is a concrete canopy leading to the assembly hall. To the east is a two-storey block containing a library, and a spine corridor runs to the north, connecting by pergolas to paired classrooms. To the west are gymnasium blocks, and there are other additions.	II
79 Frenchgate; 54.40582°N 1.73393°W		Undated	The cottage is in stone with a Welsh slate roof. There are two storeys and two bays. The doorway is in the central, the windows are modern, and all have rendered lintels.	II
14 Maison Dieu; 54.40628°N 1.73106°W		Undated	The house is in stone with a pantile roof. There are two storeys and three bays. The doorway is in the centre, and the windows are sashes, those on the ground floor with brick voussoirs.	II
Cobble stones, Upper Frenchgate; 54.40502°N 1.73418°W	—	Undated	The cobble stones pave the roadway of Upper Frenchgate.	II
Wall and gates, St Mary's Church; 54.40507°N 1.73340°W		Undated	At the entrance to the churchyard is a high wall and iron gates.	II
