= Richmond Town Hall, North Yorkshire =

Municipal building in Richmond, North Yorkshire, England

Richmond Town Hall
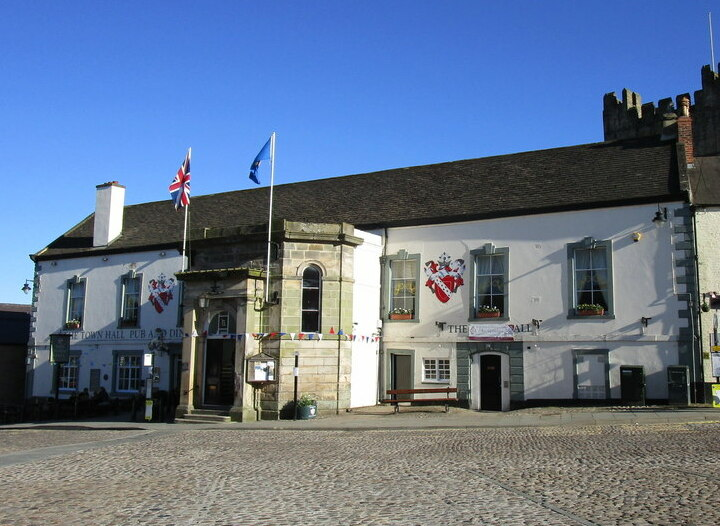
- Richmond Town Hall

- Shown in North Yorkshire
- 54.4027°N 1.7375°W
- Location: The Market Place, Richmond

History
- Built: 1756

Site notes
- Architect: Thomas Atkinson
- Architectural style: Neoclassical style

Listed Building – Grade II
- Official name: Town Hall, Town Hall Hotel
- Designated: 1 August 1952
- Reference no.: 1240517

Richmond Town Hall is a municipal building in the Market Place, Richmond, North Yorkshire, England. The structure, which is the meeting place of Richmond Town Council, is a Grade II listed building.

== History ==
The current building was erected on the site of the ancient guildhall of the Guild of St John the Baptist. It was designed by Thomas Atkinson in the neoclassical style, built in rubble masonry with a stucco finish at a cost of £600 and was completed in 1756. The design involved a near symmetrical main frontage with seven bays facing onto the Market Place; the left hand section featured a doorway with Tuscan order columns supporting an entablature in the right hand bay, while the right hand section featured a rusticated archway in the central bay. The first floor was fenestrated by a row of sash windows with keystones. The ground floor of the left hand section formed a public house while the remainder of the building formed the town hall. A double curving stone staircase provided access to the main assembly hall which displayed a coat of arms of King George II and extended the full width of the whole building on the first floor.

A courtroom, which was situated to the rear of the assembly hall, was used for petty session hearings which were held one a fortnight. A large five-sided stone porch containing a doorway with a fanlight, a hood mould and a keystone, flanked by pilasters supporting an entablature, was added to the central bay in the 19th century. Following the end of the Second Boer War, a reception was held in the town hall for members of the volunteer battalions of the Green Howards who had served in South Africa.

After the death of the founder of the Scout movement, Lord Baden-Powell, in January 1941, his widow, Lady Baden-Powell, presented a landscape painting, depicting a view from Richmond Castle down the Swale Valley, to the town; the painting, which had originally been commissioned on the occasion of the Baden-Powells' marriage, was hung over the mantelpiece in the mayor's parlour. A plaque commemorating the borough's fund raising effort during Warship Week was erected in the building in 1942. Additional plaques were installed to reflect the borough's fund raising effort during Wings for Victory Week in 1943 and during Salute the Soldier Week in 1944.

A large reception room on the ground floor of the right-hand section of the building was refurbished and fitted out as a council chamber with new furniture supplied by Waring & Gillow in 1956. An early 17th century portrait of Queen Elizabeth I on a wooden panel, which had previously hung in the Bowes Hospital at the foot of Anchorage Hill, was installed in the council chamber. The courtroom on the first floor remained in use as a judicial facility until 1964 when hearings moved to the new magistrates' courts in I'Anson Road.

The council chamber ceased to be the local seat of government when the enlarged Richmondshire District Council was formed at Swale House in Richmond in 1974. However, it subsequently became the meeting place of Richmond Town Council. The courtroom, although no longer in use, was restored in 2002, and the Prince of Wales and the Duchess of Cornwall attended a reception in the town hall in September 2005. The future Chancellor of the Exchequer, Rishi Sunak, spoke at a meeting in the town hall, arranged to make the case for Brexit, in June 2016.

Other works of art in the town hall include a painting by Harold Speed depicting Green Bridge, a painting by Arthur Bell showing a goose fair in the town and a painting by Robert Gallon depicting a view of the river.

== See also ==
- Listed buildings in Richmond, North Yorkshire
