= The Fleece =

Building in Richmond, North Yorkshire, England

Coordinates: 54.4041°N 1.7383°W

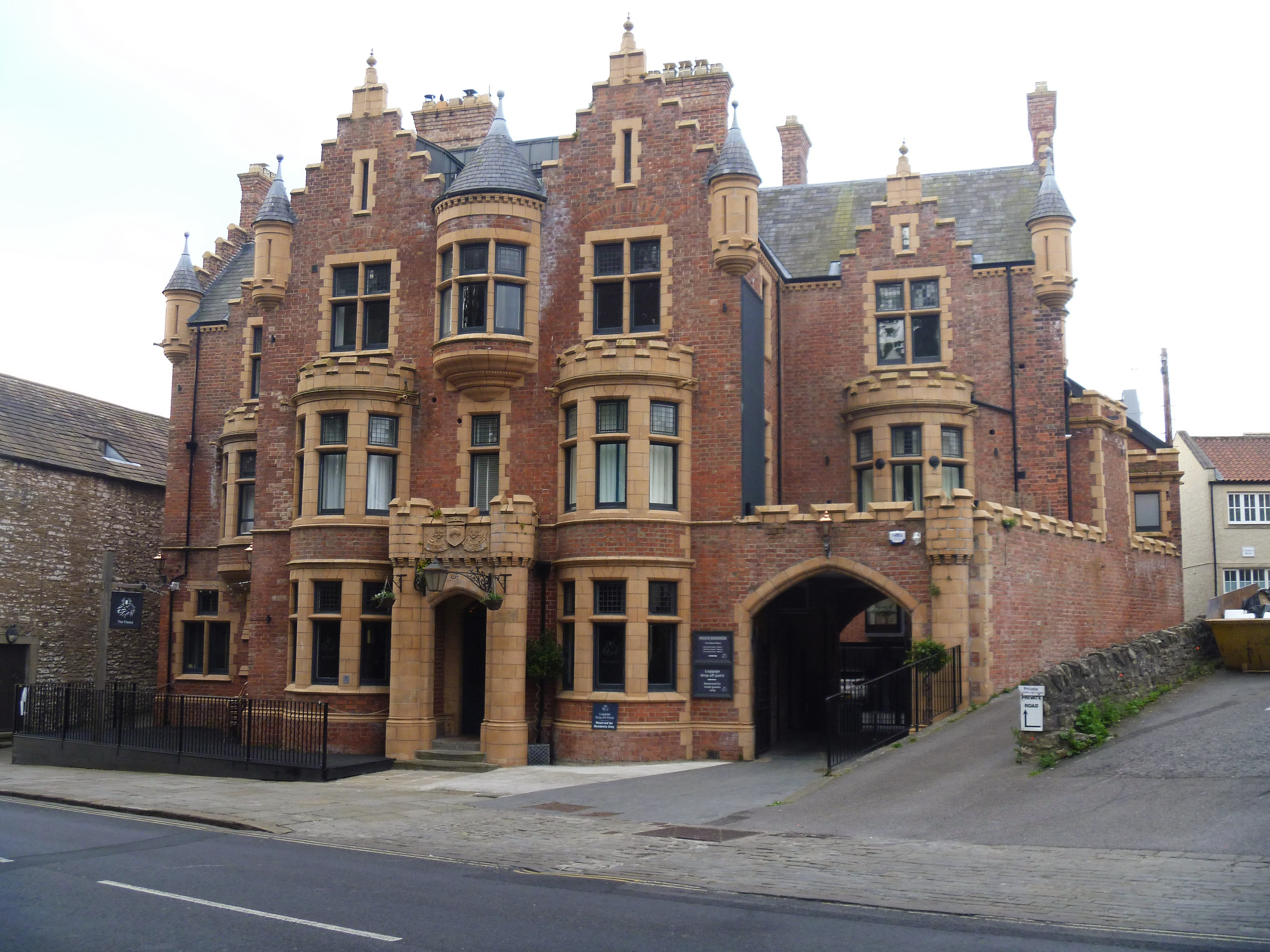
The building, in 2022

The Fleece is a historic building in Richmond, North Yorkshire, a town in England.

The building was constructed as a hotel, replacing an older building of the same name. It was designed by G. G. Hoskins in the Scottish baronial style, and opened in October 1898. In the late 20th century it was converted into a pub and nightclub; in 1983, its darts team set the world record for the highest score in 24 hours, with a total of 1,721,784. In 2019 the building was converted into a restaurant and hotel, but the hotel closed in 2023 and the building was partly converted into apartments. The hotel and restaurant reopened in 2024. The building has been grade II listed since 1984.

The building is constructed of brick and terracotta, and has a tile roof with crow-stepped gables and ceramic bowed oriel turrets with arrow slits and round pointed roofs. It has four storeys and five bays, the outer bays recessed. The central entrance has a porch with a four-centred arch flanked by ceramic round turrets, machicolated and embattled with a parapet containing a coat of arms, above which is a sash window and an oriel window. The flanking bays contain two-storey bow windows with embattled balconies. Elsewhere, there are sash windows, and in the right bay is a carriage entrance with a four-centred arch. Inside, the original mahogany staircase survives, along with leaded light glass and some panelling.

== See also ==
- Listed buildings in Richmond, North Yorkshire (north and outer areas)
