= Church of St Mary the Virgin, Richmond =

Anglican church in Richmond, North Yorkshire, England

- Parish Church of St Mary, Richmond
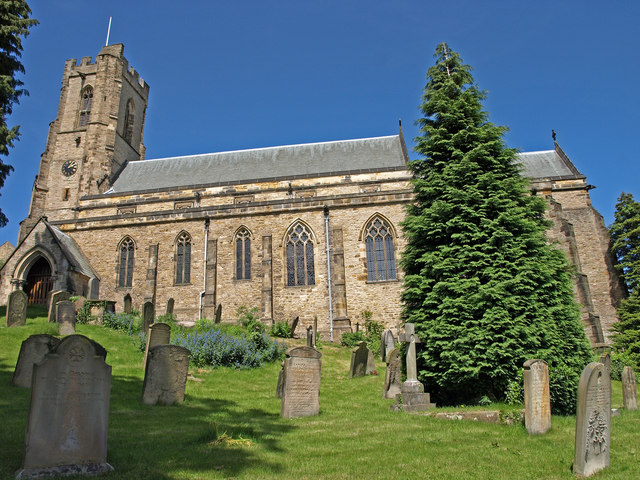
- St. Mary the Virgin, Richmond

- Location within North Yorkshire
- 54.4047°N 1.7329°W
- OS grid reference: NZ 17432 01066
- Location: Richmond, North Yorkshire
- Country: England
- Denomination: Church of England
- Website: Official webpage

History
- Status: Active

Architecture
- Architectural type: Perpendicular; Gothic

Administration
- Diocese: Leeds
- Archdeaconry: Richmond and Craven
- Deanery: Richmond
- Benefice: Richmond with Hudswell, Downholme and Marske
- Parish: Richmond with Hudswell (460359)

Clergy
- Vicar: Martin Fletcher

Listed Building – Grade II*
- Designated: 1 August 1952
- Reference no.: 1289814

The Church of St Mary the Virgin, Richmond, is the Anglican parish church in the town of Richmond in North Yorkshire, England. Previously, there was also Holy Trinity Church, Richmond, which served as a chapel. In the early part of the twentieth century, it was officiated over by the incumbent of St Mary's. In the 1960s, Holy Trinity was deconsecrated and now serves as the Green Howards' museum in the town.

The patronage of the church was originally given to the monks of St Mary's Abbey in York, then at the Dissolution, it was offered to the Crown. Later, it was in the possession of the Bishop of Chester as part of the Diocese of Chester. It is now in the Diocese of Leeds. The churchyard at St Mary's has a plague pit and the graves of two soldiers from Waterloo, and it also used to house the original Richmond School building.

The church and its surrounds are built on a hill that slopes down to the River Swale on the eastern side of the town.

St Mary's has been subjected to several renovations, most notably in the 19th century, and is now a grade II* listed building.

== History ==
Originally, the Church of the Holy Trinity in Richmond town square was said to be the mother church of the parish as it was within the castle walls, but as the town and population increased, so Trinity became the daughter church of St Mary's. It is said that the distance between the two was only 1,000 feet (300 m). The Church of the Holy Trinity was deconsecrated in 1960s and disposed of. Since the early 1970s, it has housed the Green Howards Regimental Museum, whereas the Church of St Mary, is host to their Regimental Chapel. Some historians have stated that the church of Holy Trinity was never the parish church, despite being within the town walls, as it had no evidence of a burial ground. Clarkson states in his History of Richmond, that Holy Trinity was too small to accommodate the growing population and so a "Low Church, situated on the declivity of the hill" was built. This was in the original burial ground for Trinity church, outside the town walls. However, until The Reformation, both churches were lesser in terms of religious importance in comparison to Easby Abbey (St Agatha). At this time, the parish only contained the town and borough with some outlying smaller houses.

The church was constructed on a slope which leads down towards a sharp bend in the River Swale known as Clink Pool, (named after the wooded bank on the north side of the river), and across the river over Mercury Bridge, which was built in 1846 to afford an easy route into the town from the railway station.

Parts of the nave and aisles date back to the middle of the 12th century, but the varied renovations have left a much altered church from what is believed to be a cruciform building originally. Some of the columns used in the church are believed to predate this structure and were incorporated into the 12th century church. The tower, which extends to 80 feet (24 m), was built c. 1399–1400 by the Earl of Westmorland and the font dates from around the same time period. The tower is supported on each of its four corners by buttresses and internally used to have the arms of the Nevill family; The Earl of Westmorland (Ralph Neville), was granted the Honour of Richmond in 1399 by Henry IV, and he set about improving the church among other things. The font is carved from Teesdale Marble, which was quarried in the Egglestone area of County Durham. The stone is a form of limestone which has many fossil remnants within it and was popular as a building stone for abbeys and churches around the late 14th and early 15th centuries.

Before The Reformation, the windows in the church displayed images from the scriptures, but these were later viewed as "superstitious" post-Reformation and so fell to decay or were replaced with ordinary glass. Various additions to the church during the 15th century have led to the whole church being labelled as Perpendicular in its architectural style, however, some other structures remain from the various alterations which have also seen the building labelled as Gothic.

The twelve misericords inside the church came from Easby Abbey. They date from the early sixteenth century and show a sow playing the bagpipes for two piglets, and a dragon stealing a goose. Religious carvings and artefacts were often moved from abbeys and priories after the Dissolution. The misericords are dated to at least 1515, as one of them is indented with the shield of Abbot Bampton, who was elected to Easby Abbey in 1515. Other items taken from the abbey and installed in the church include the choir stalls and some of the bells.

Between 1858 and 1859, the church was renovated by Sir Gilbert Scott, which was funded by the Earl of Rutland and cost around £1,200. In 1890, the verger removed a stone item from the churchyard and placed it at the bottom of the pulpit. This is believed to be the Norman era font of the worship house that existed in Richmond before either church was in regular use. In 1892, the chancel was altered by the addition of new level flooring and a window in the south wall to allow more light in. Previous sketches of the church show that there used to be a window in the south wall, but at some point, this was walled up. More renovations took place in 1897 under C. Hodgson Fowler, the most notable of which was the installation of a steep pitched roof covered in slates. Previously, the roof was flat.

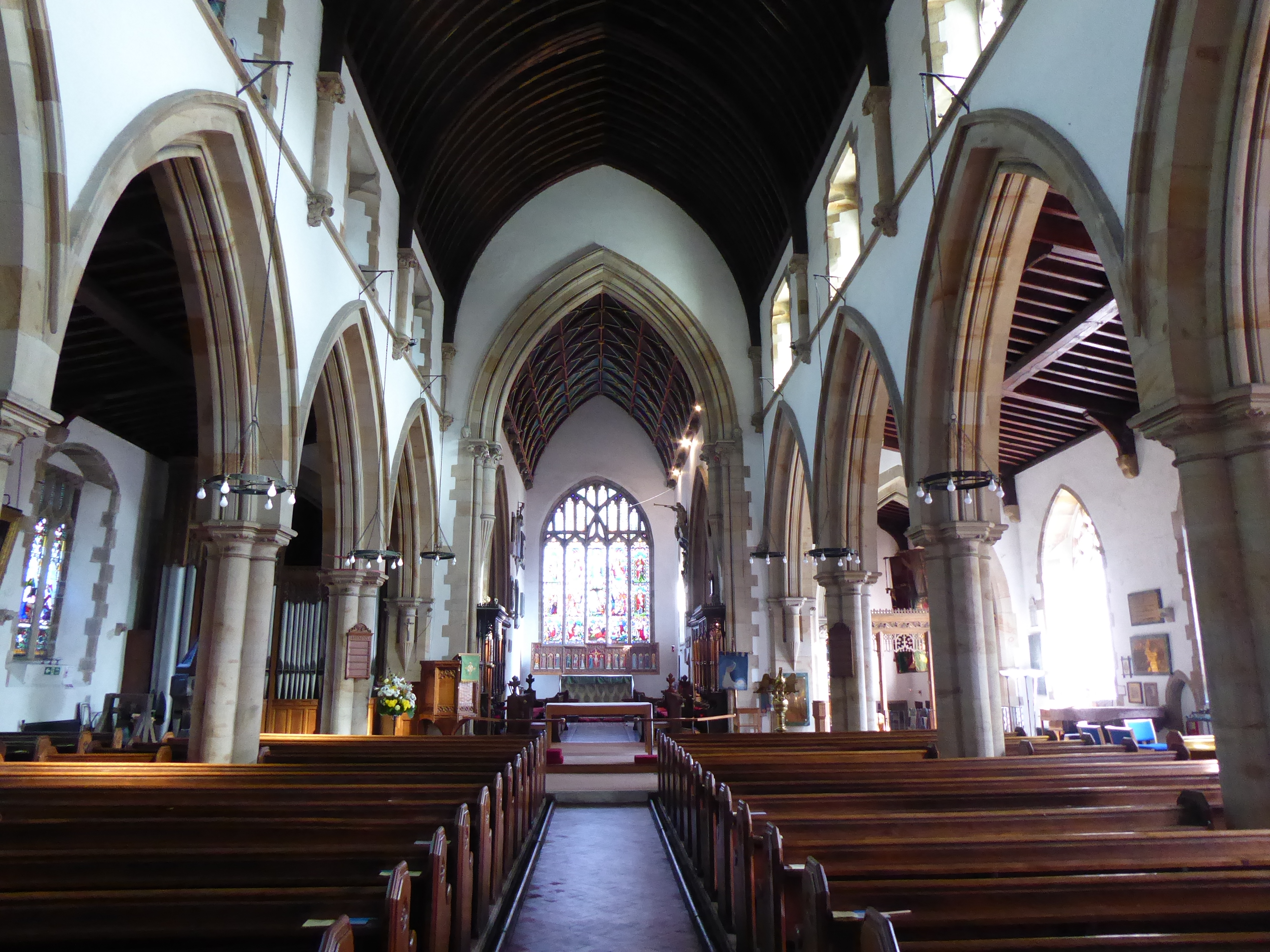
The Nave

In March 2017, the bells were replaced with modern castings and housed at the same height to make the bellringing easier and to safeguard the tower. The three previous bells, cast c. 1500 and 1697, were replaced by eight new bells cast at the foundry of John Taylor & Co in Loughborough. One of the old bells has been preserved in the belfry. The Society of Bellringers of St Mary's Parish Church ring the bells in the church and are recognised as a teaching hub for the local area. The bells are rung in the town for special occasions; either local or national events.

The organ was installed in the north chapel in 1811, and was replaced in 1912 with one built by Harrison & Harrison. This second organ was completely refurbished in 2003.

=== Regimental chapel ===
The church hosts the regimental chapel of the Green Howards, which has a service each spring for former members of the regiment. The chapel was dedicated after an appeal for funds in 1931. St Mary's had been the official church of the garrison and regiment since the early 19th century, and the chapel has colours hanging from the rafters, mementoes from the First World War and an altar rail dedicated to two lieutenants killed in 1915 and 1917. As the Green Howards have been subsumed into the modern day Yorkshire Regiment, the Royal Lancers have adopted the chapel for their services.

The chapel and the interior of the church are adorned with memorials to members of the armed forces who either died in action or represented the Green Howards in some way (IE senior officers). A stone tablet, set into one of the walls, commemorates the dead from 1916 to 1919 and is listed as the Yorkshire Regiment, which was how the Green Howards were sometimes known.

== Churchyard ==
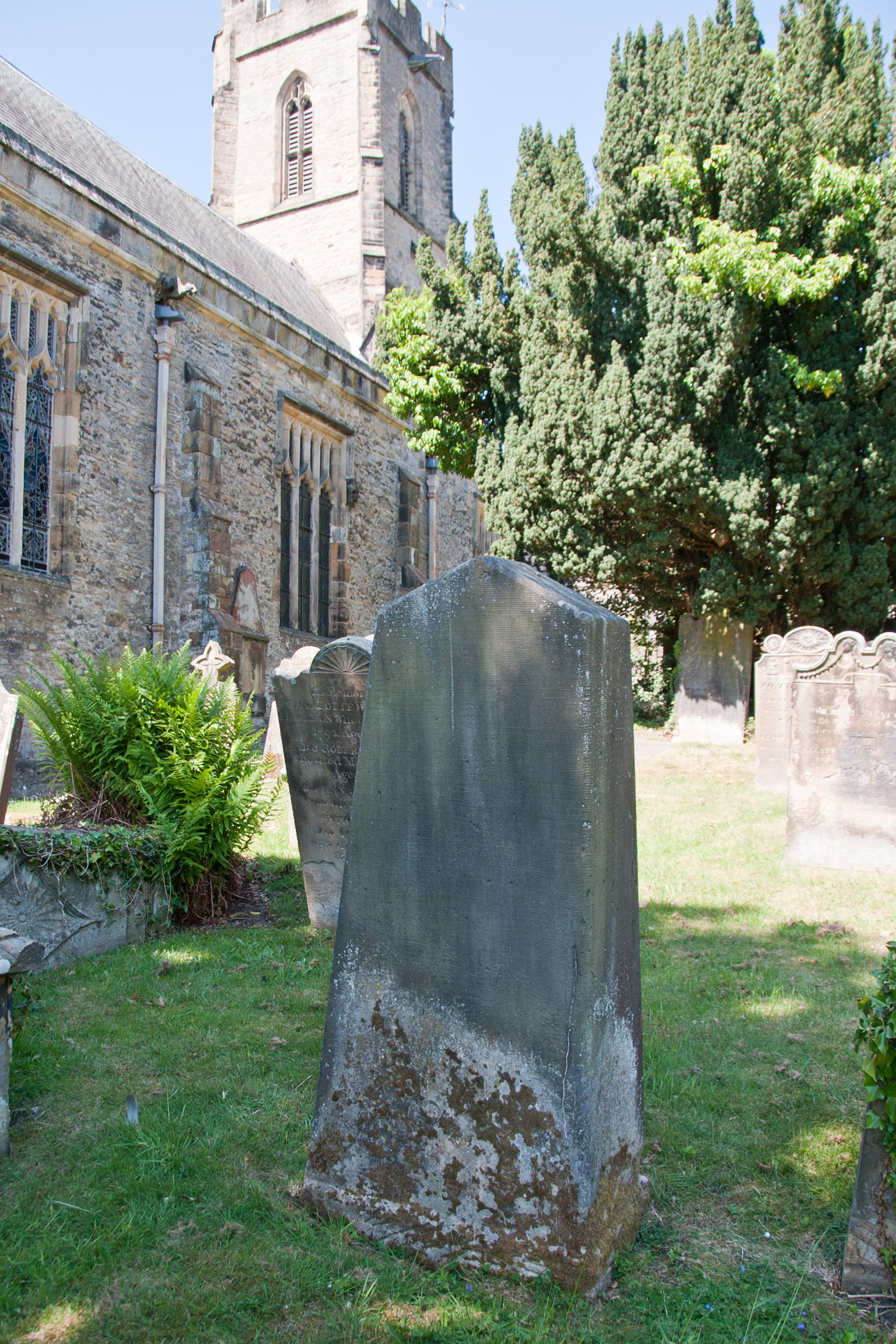
The Plague Stone

The churchyard has the graves of two soldiers who died at Waterloo and of Robert Willance, a local alderman and draper. Willance was out hunting in 1606 when his horse fell off Whitcliffe Scar with Willance suffering a broken leg and the horse dying. Willance's amputated leg was buried in the churchyard, with Willance being reunited with his leg ten years later when he died.

The graveyard also contains a plague stone (one of two in Richmond), (Note: The other stone marks a spot of a crossroads on the road between Richmond and Ravensworth, which housed a receptacle for vinegar (for cleansing) and the place where goods and food could be left for those isolating from the plague.) which marks the spot where the bodies of 1,072 people who succumbed to the Black Death between 1597 and 1599, were buried. (Note: Other sources state 1,050 deaths.) Another 700 people were buried as a result of a plague upon the town between 1644 and 1645, with 574 being buried in just six months alone.

In 1816, the "boy-poet", Herbert Knowles, published his poetry entitled Stanzas in a Richmond Churchyard. Knowles had been a pupil at Richmond School, but died not long after his poetry was published. In 1861, the Bishop of Ripon ordered that a tombstone be removed from the grave of a recent burial as it contained the Latin phrase Miserere mei deus, which, at the time, was contrary to what was allowed as it was viewed as a "Purgatorial text". The family were consulted and they refused to remove the stone, so the church authorities did it instead.

At the north-eastern entrance to the churchyard is a high wall and railings which are grade II listed.

=== Richmond School ===
The original school (built c. 1392) was located on the eastern side of the churchyard, being listed on mapping from at least 1610. It was moved across the road to a new site further west in the 1670s and was used for schooling until 2012. The school and the church retained their connection with many former heads of the school having either burials, or memorials within the church grounds.

== Parish and patronage ==
The ecclesiastical parish of Richmond includes the church of St Michael and All Angels, Hudswell. Previously, the parish encompassed a larger area including the hamlet of Marske to the west. In 2018, the average weekly attendance was 100 people.

In 1137, Earl Stephen granted the "churches of Richmond" to St Mary's Abbey in York. The church was administered by the Priory of St Martin, situated to the south of the town across the River Swale; St Martin's also belonged to St Mary's in York. After the Dissolution, the church was in the patronage of the crown and latterly was under the control of the Bishop of Chester. In the 21st century, the parish and church are in the Archdeaconry of Richmond and Craven, which is part of the Diocese of Leeds.

== Clergy ==
Vicars incumbent at St Mary's are recorded as far back as 1250. Listings are taken from church records.

Clergy of St Mary the Virgin, Richmond
Year	Incumbent	Year	Incumbent	Year	Incumbent	Year	Incumbent
1250	Peter Chaplain	1465	Oliver Bland	1700	Robert Booth	1907	Nevill Egerton Leigh
1316	Nicholas de Kirkeby	1473	Robert Mason	1705	William Lupton•	1927	Arnold Moon Sullivan
1280	William Clericus	1554	Edward Gretehead♦	1706	Thomas Brooke	1940	Sheffield G B Exham
1317	Thomas Sleight	1568	Thomas Ford	1739	Francis Blackburne† (Note: Blackburne died in 1787, the next listed incumbent is in 1789. However, he is listed as having served "eight and forty years" in the parish.)	1945	William Stuart Macpherson‡
1318	John Sleight	1569	Anthony Ford	1789	Thomas Leighton♦	1954	Peter de la Poer Beresford-Peirse (Note: Sometimes mistakenly written as Peter Beresford Perrso. The Beresford Peirses are from the area, usually near to Bedale.)
1322	Robert Bouges	1573	Nicolas Stonell	1789	Christopher Goodwill (Note: Goodwill was previously the rector in charge of the Holy Trinity Chapel in Richmond between 1778 and 1789.)	1962	David H Sillar
1340	John de Bek	1582	Edmund Sitheby	1822	William Barnes	1974	Christopher Norman Hessler White
1353	Hugo de Frithby	1585	Anthony Jackson	1838	Robert Meek	1976	Christopher Norman Hessler White (Note: In 1976, the Parish was amended from just Richmond, to the Parish of Richmond with Hudswell.)
1366	Robert de Akesgarth	1620	Thomas Rokeby	1843	Frederick Scott Surtees	1998	Richard Cooper•
1369	John Harwood	1639	George Fernly	1850	Lawrence Ottley†	2009	John Chambers•
1443	Robert Eston	1649	Thomas Hill	1861	Richard E Roberts	2017	Martin Fletcher
1449	Hugh Walker	1658	John Kearton	1890	William Danks‡		
1462	Robert Mason	1664	Richard Godvalve	1897	Ludovick Stuart Robinson		

- † Died in office
- • Retired or resigned
- ‡ Became Archdeacon of Richmond during their incumbency
- ♦ Interregnum between incumbent and previous when dates are incorrect, period appears too long or records are incomplete.

Thomas Rokeby, incumbent from 1620, was subject to a visitation from the church authorities overseeing the Diocese of Chester. (Note: The Archdeaconry of Richmond was one of two Archdeaconries in the Diocese of Chester between 1546 and 1830. The Archdeaconry of Richmond still exists, but it is now part of the Diocese of Leeds.) They found that Rokeby was nonconformist in his preachings and in the services he was holding at the church. He was scolded over his actions with the deputation recording that "we have so dealt with him that he will not dare the like again in any kind."

The incumbency of F Scott Surtees was marred by controversy; in 1845, he stated that the curate of the chapel of the Holy Trinity should swear his allegiance and reverence to Surtees, something which the curate disagreed with. A higher opinion was sought and the adjudicator found in favour of the curate. Three years later, a resident of Richmond complained to the York Herald newspaper that he couldn't get his children baptised at Richmond as the curate of St Mary's and the curate of Holy Trinity were too busy. The complainant highlighted that Surtees was having a year off, for which his wage would be £600 per annum, whereas the two curates each received only £100. Surtees was accused of enjoying dolce far niente (doing sweet nothing), with the permission of the Lord Bishop.

From 1 November 1897, when Ludovick Stewart Robinson was installed as the vicar at St Mary's, each successive vicar has also been the curate in charge of the Holy Trinity Chapel.

== See also ==
- Grade II* listed churches in North Yorkshire (district)
- Listed buildings in Richmond, North Yorkshire
