= Hill House, Richmond =

Building in Richmond, North Yorkshire, England

Coordinates: 54.4069°N 1.7324°W

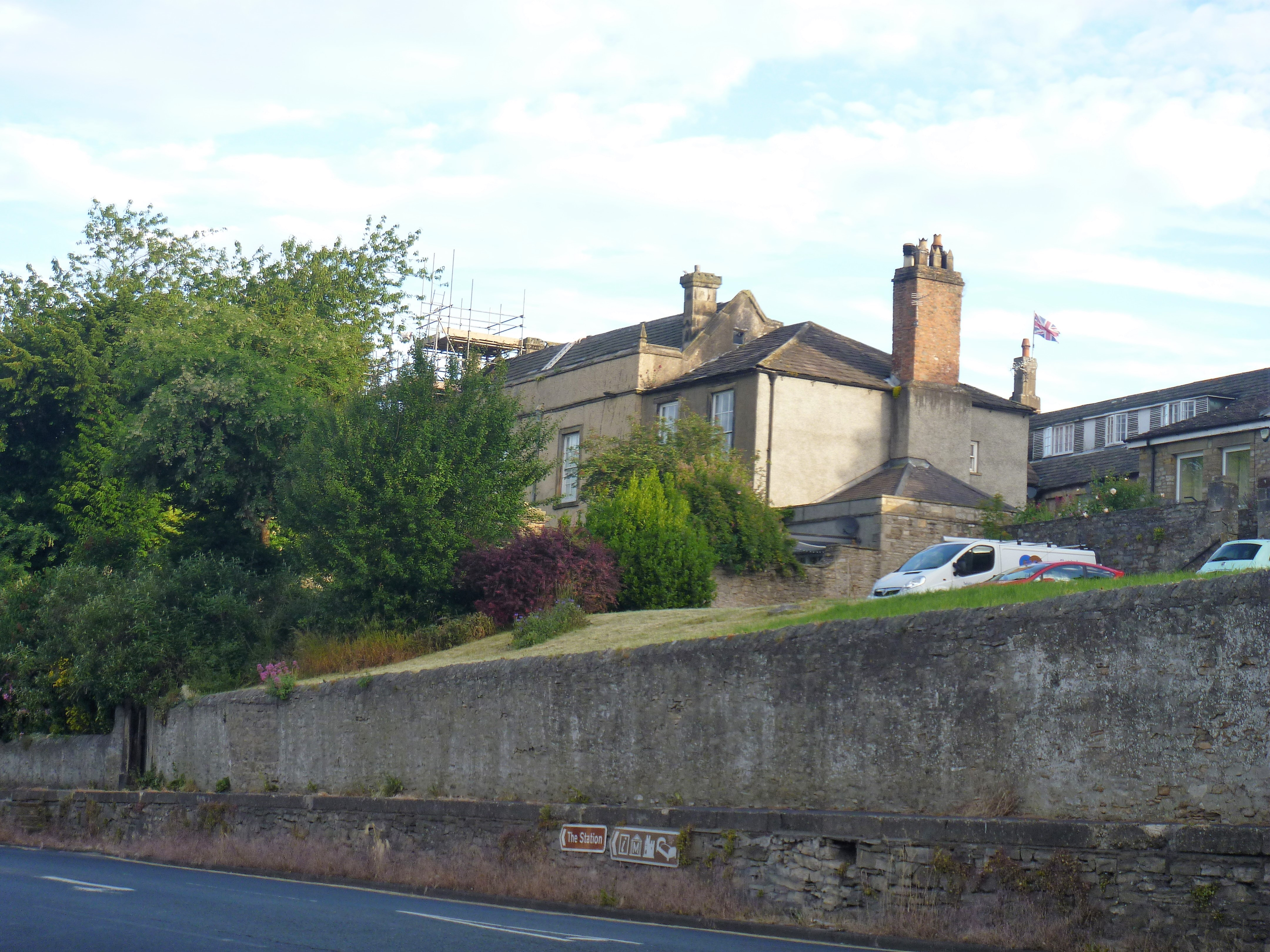
The building, in 2022

Hill House is a historic building in Richmond, North Yorkshire, a town in England.

The house was built in the 17th century, and was refronted in the 18th century. Historic England describe the front as "very fine". It was owned by the family of Frances I'Anson, about whom Leonard McNally wrote "The Lass of Richmond Hill". Another resident was Anne Milbanke, to whom Lord Byron wrote frequently. The building was grade II* listed in 1952, and the garden wall, gates and gate piers are collectively also grade II* listed.

The house is rendered. It has two storeys and seven bays, the middle three bays projecting under a pediment with a moulded band and two finials. The doorway has a moulded surround, a pulvinated frieze and a modillion cornice. On the ground floor are three large Venetian windows with Ionic mullions, and the other windows have moulded frames and sills. On the left is a single-storey extension, and there is a rear wing containing two doorways with moulded surrounds and triple keystones, and dormers.

The 18th-century gates are made of wrought iron, and are flanked by rusticated stone gate piers with ball finials. The garden is enclosed by a stone wall that is ramped up to the piers, and contains later openings.

== See also ==
- Grade II* listed buildings in North Yorkshire (district)
- Listed buildings in Richmond, North Yorkshire (north and outer areas)
