= Bowes Hospital =

Building in Richmond, North Yorkshire, England

Coordinates: 54.4067°N 1.7307°W

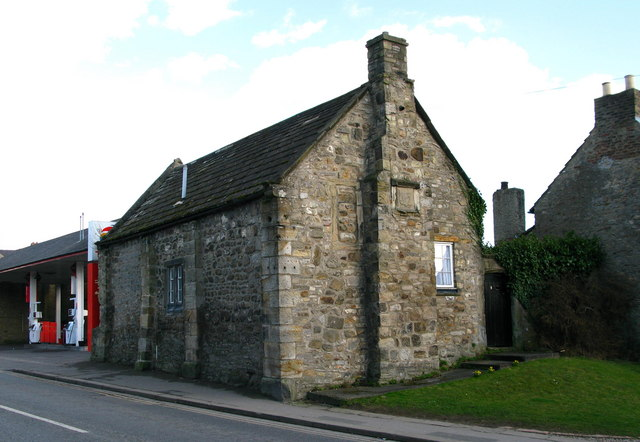
The building, in 2009

The Bowes Hospital, also known as the Eleanor Bowes Hospital, is a historic building in Richmond, North Yorkshire, a town in England.

St Edmund's Chapel was built in the 12th century. The windows were altered in the 14th century, and the west gable was rebuilt in 1607. In 1618, the building was converted into an almshouse, using an endowment from Eleanor Bowes. It was divided into three apartments for the use of poor widows, two to be from Richmond, and one from Easby. The 14th-century windows were blocked, and the current windows date from the last couple of centuries. The building was grade II* listed in 1952.

The almshouse is built of stone with a string course incorporating medallions, and has a stone slate roof with raised and coped gables, and shaped and carved kneelers. It has a single storey, and three bays divided by buttresses. On the south front are two doorways and windows, and in the east gable end is a blocked window with an ogee head. The west gable end has a panel in a moulded frame with a coat of arms. Extending to the south is a wall with a moulded cornice and a Tudor arched doorway. Inside, the west wall has an early-17th century fireplace, and both west and east walls have plaster friezes of similar date.

== See also ==
- Grade II* listed buildings in North Yorkshire (district)
- Listed buildings in Richmond, North Yorkshire (north and outer areas)
