= Frenchgate Hotel =

Hotel in Richmond, North Yorkshire, England

Coordinates: 54.4051°N 1.7343°W

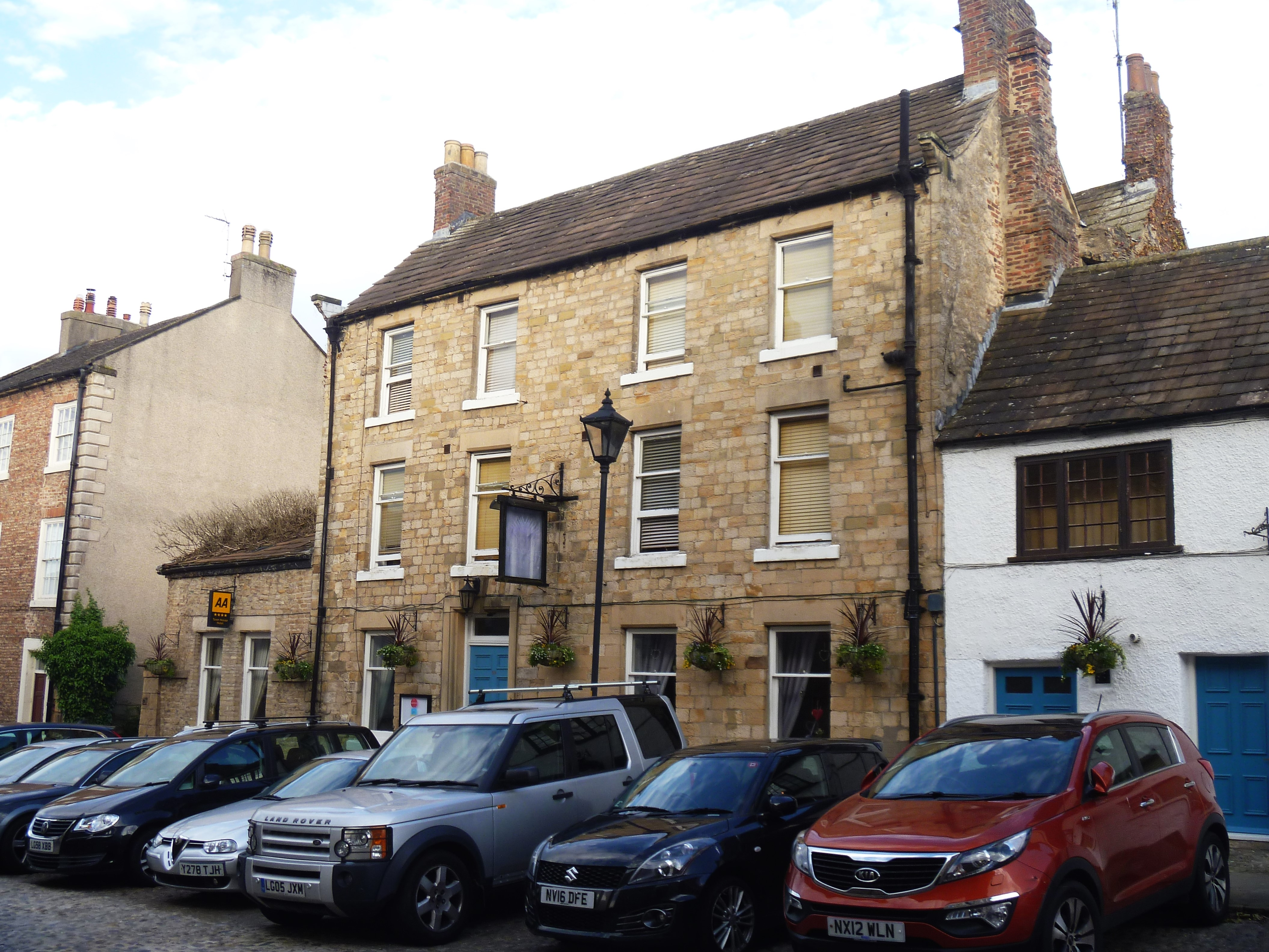
The building, in 2022

The Frenchgate Hotel is a historic building in Richmond, North Yorkshire, a town in England.

The building was constructed in the early to mid 19th century, as a house. It was later converted into a hotel, and combined with the neighbouring house at 61 Frenchgate. The two sections were separately grade II listed in 1967. In 2024, the owners of the hotel applied for planning permission to convert it into a house.

The main building of the hotel is constructed of stone and has a stone slate roof with stone kneelers. It has three storeys and four bays. The doorway has a moulded surround, a rectangular fanlight and a keystone, and the windows are sashes.

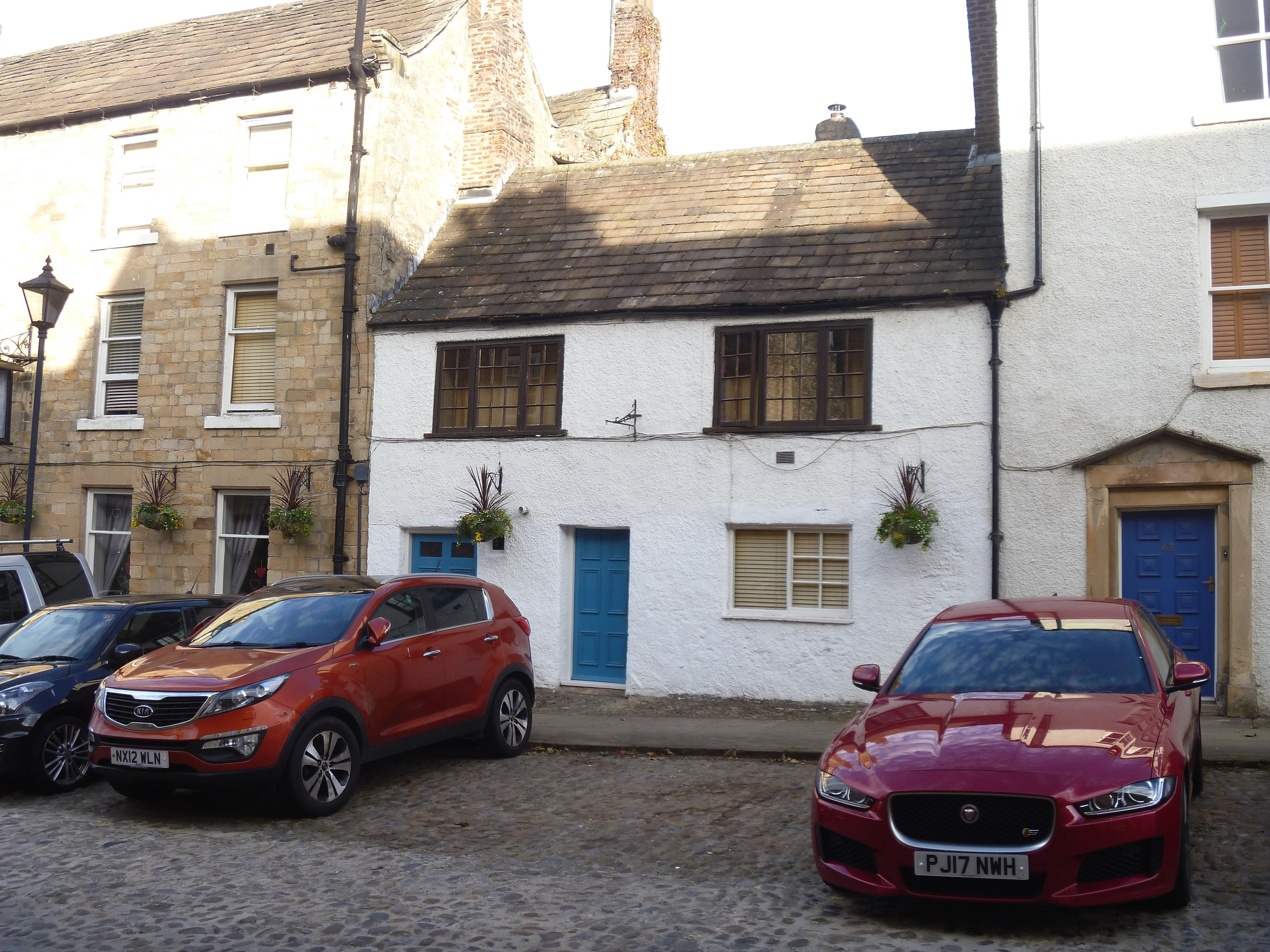
61 Frenchgate

61 Frenchgate is an early-18th century cottage. It is rendered and painted, and has a stone slate roof. It has two storeys and two bays. On the front are two doorways, and the windows are casements.

== See also ==
- Listed buildings in Richmond, North Yorkshire (north and outer areas)
