= Herbert Knowles (poet) =

English poet

- Born: 1798
- Died: 1817 (aged 18–19)
- Writing career
- Genre: Poetry

Herbert Knowles (1798–1817) was an English poet.

Knowles was the author of the well-known 'Stanzas written in the churchyard of Richmond, Yorkshire', which gave promise of future excellence. However, he died a few weeks after he had been enabled, through the help of Robert Southey to whom he had sent some of his poems, to go to the University of Cambridge.
