= Greyfriars, Richmond =

Friary in Richmond, North Yorkshire, England

Greyfriars
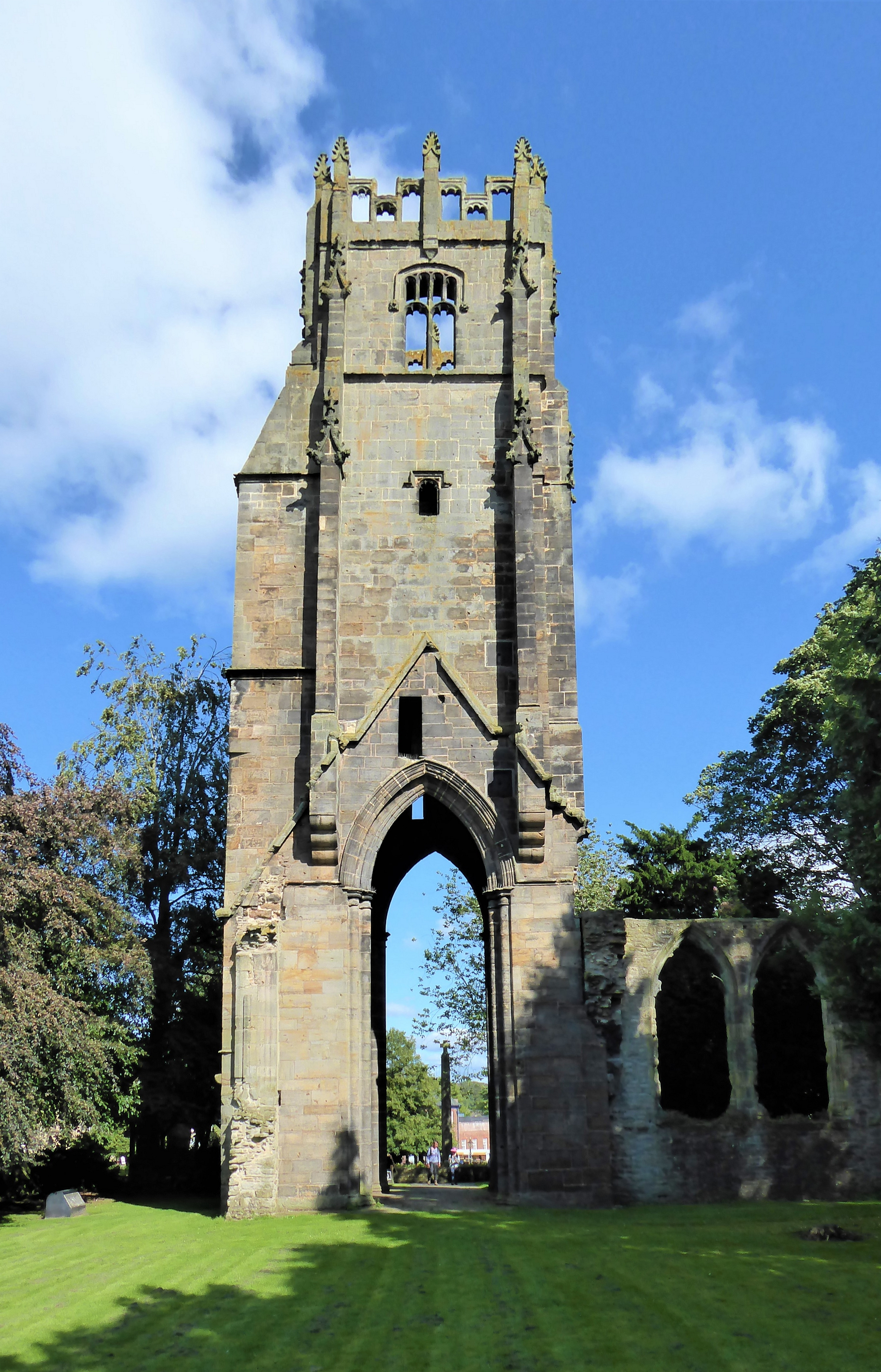
- The remains of Richmond Greyfriars

Religion
- Affiliation: Catholicism Christianity
- Status: Dissestablished

Location
- Location: North Yorkshire, England
- Country: England
- Interactive map of Greyfriars
- Coordinates: 54.4046°N 1.7380°W

Architecture
- Architect: Ralph Fitz Randall
- Completed: 1258

Greyfriars, Richmond was a friary in North Yorkshire, England. Its bell tower still survives and dates from the 15th century. Its establishment as a friary is attributed to Ralph Fitz Randall in 1258. His heart was buried there in 1270. During the Crusades, Archbishop Romanus requested that two priests be sent from the friary, one there and one to Copeland (Cumberland). In 1304, an "apostate friar", Arthur of Hartlepool, upon being arrested, was sent to the friary for punishment. It was surrendered 19 January 1538, after it had accumulated five and a half acres of land from William de Huddeswell (in 1364) and John de Nevill (in 1383).

== See also ==
- Grade I listed buildings in North Yorkshire (district)
- Listed buildings in Richmond, North Yorkshire
