= Richmond Racecourse =

Horse-racing ground in Richmond, North Yorkshire

Richmond Richmond Low Moor
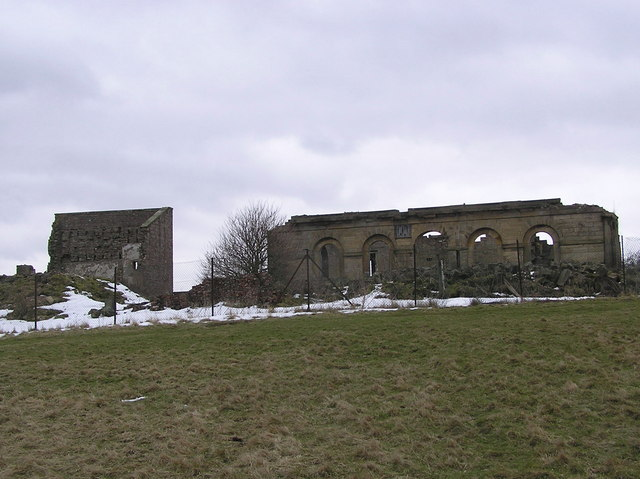
- Richmond Racecourse Grandstand
- Interactive map of Richmond; Richmond Low Moor
- Location: Richmond, North Yorkshire, England
- Coordinates: 54.4148°N 1.7498°W
- Date opened: 1765
- Date closed: 1891

Richmond Racecourse was a British horse racing track situated at Richmond, North Yorkshire at first High Moor, then Low Moor, from 1765 to 1776. It was last used for horse racing in 1891. The grandstand, believed to have been designed by John Carr, is now the oldest surviving stone-built public grandstand in the world.

== History ==
The former racecourse is located to the north-west of Richmond town on Low Moor ( a name it was sometimes referred to as), and its elevation is 847 feet (258 m). The grandstand was paid for by public subscription, being erected in 1775, and it is believed to be the work of architect John Carr, who also designed the grandstands at Doncaster and York. The land at Low Moor was levelled "at great public expense".

Horse-racing had been held in the environs of Richmond since at least 1576 (usually on High Moor), and by 1765, had moved to Low Moor, though racing had been conducted at Gatherley in 1516 (Gatherley is 5 miles (8 km) to the east of the town). Christopher Rokeby, who spied on the Scottish court and Mary, Queen of Scots attended races at Gatherley, as did Roger Aston, a Cheshire-born courtier of James VI of Scotland.

A law was passed in 1740 by George II that races must not be run for a prize less than £50. This had been to prevent the lower classes engaging in horse-racing (they were accused of "Idleness"). The same law dictated that horse races were to start and finish on the same day. As a result of this, Richmond racecourse stopped its races, but they were revived in 1760. Between 1765 and the building of the main grandstand in 1775, a temporary wooden stand was erected each year, the impetus for a more permanent structure came about due to the course holding the Hambleton Hundred Guineas Race. Besides the main grandstand, a private stand was built in 1814 for the Zetland family.

The track was in a rough oval shape and ran for a distance of 1.5 miles (2.4 km) with the grandstand in the middle at the west end, which afforded the spectators views of the race without them losing sight of the jockeys. Races were run in a clockwise direction.

The site last hosted races in August 1891; the Jockey Club had decided that one of the turns on the course was too tight for the modern thoroughbred horses. Additionally, the nearby course at Catterick was nearer to both the main roads and railways in the region. The grandstand had its lead roof stripped in the 1950s and further demolition occurred in the late 1960s.

Horses are still run and trained on the gallops by local owners, although the site is criss-crossed by public footpaths.

== Grandstand ==
The grandstand building, which is now a grade II* listed structure, is the oldest stone-built public grandstand in the world. It is built of stone, and has a large rectangular plan. On the ground floor are five round-headed arches, with a Tuscan arcade in front, above which is a balcony with railings. On the upper storey are round-headed windows, and above is a flat roof with a balustraded parapet. Due to the grandstand's condition, it has appeared on Historic England's Heritage at Risk register in 2019.

== See also ==
- Grade II* listed buildings in North Yorkshire (district)
- List of British racecourses
