= Listed buildings in Richmond, North Yorkshire =

Because of is large size, this list has been split into two smaller lists. These can be found at:

- Listed buildings in Richmond, North Yorkshire (central area)
- Listed buildings in Richmond, North Yorkshire (north and outer areas)
