= Richmond, North Yorkshire =

Town in North Yorkshire, England

Coordinates: 54°24′11″N 1°44′13″W

Richmond
- Town
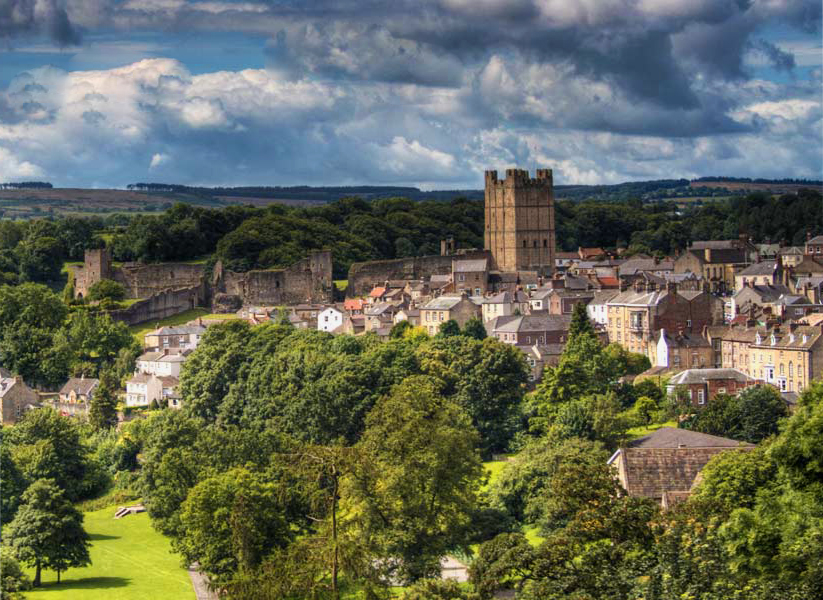
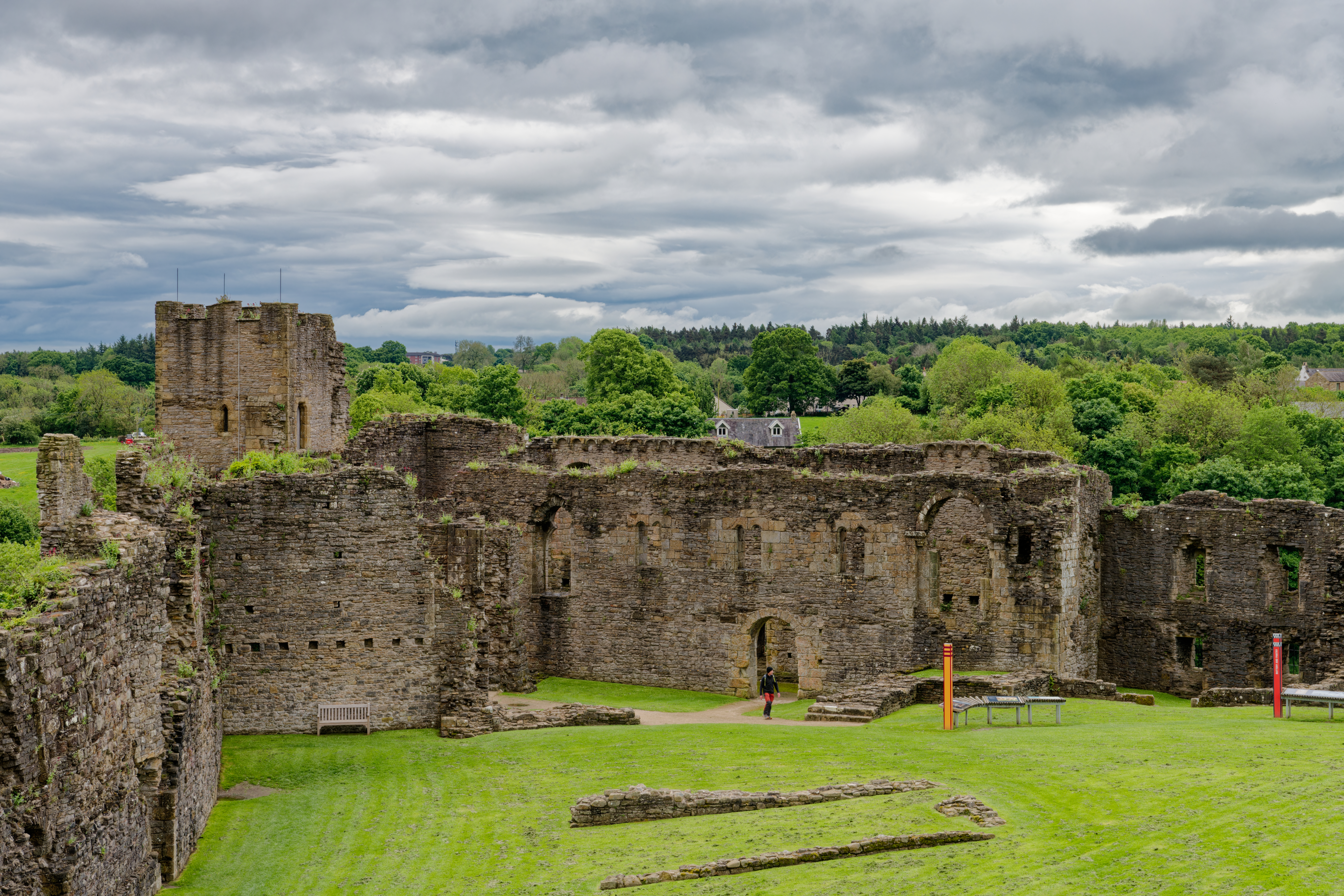
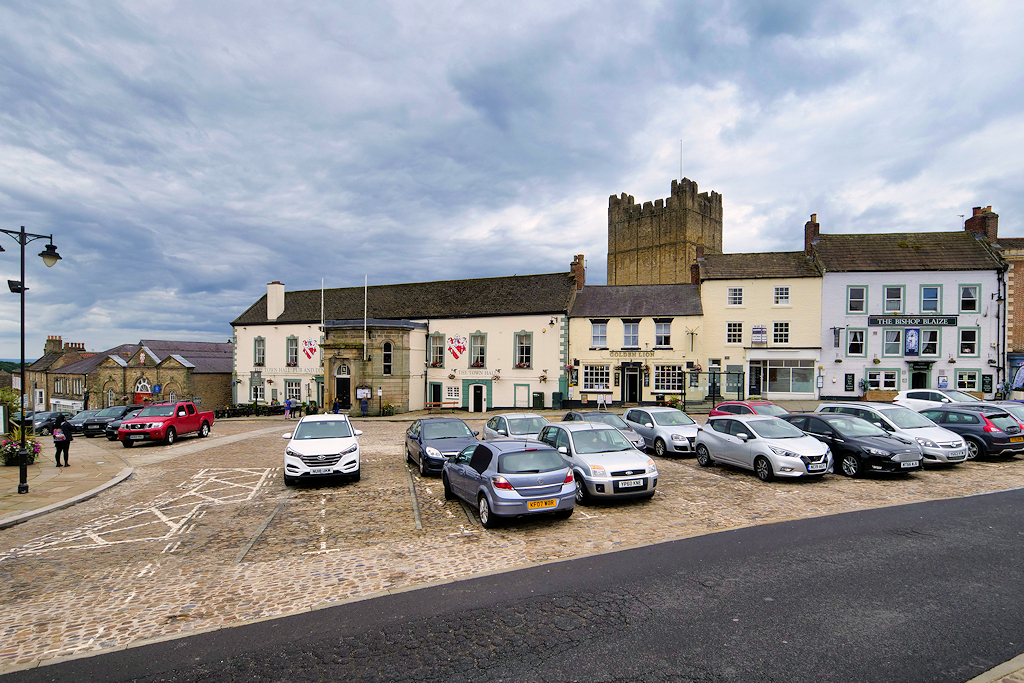
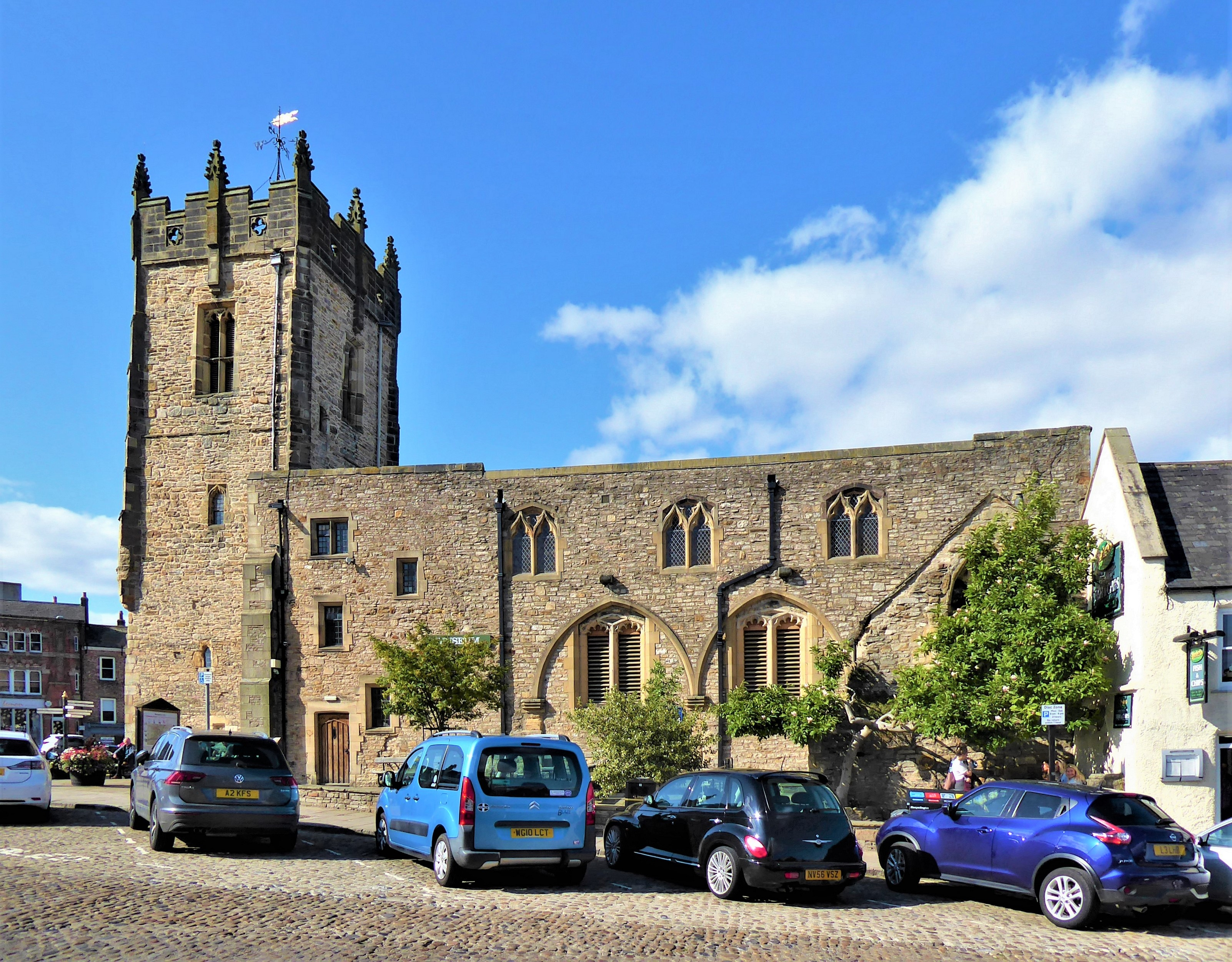
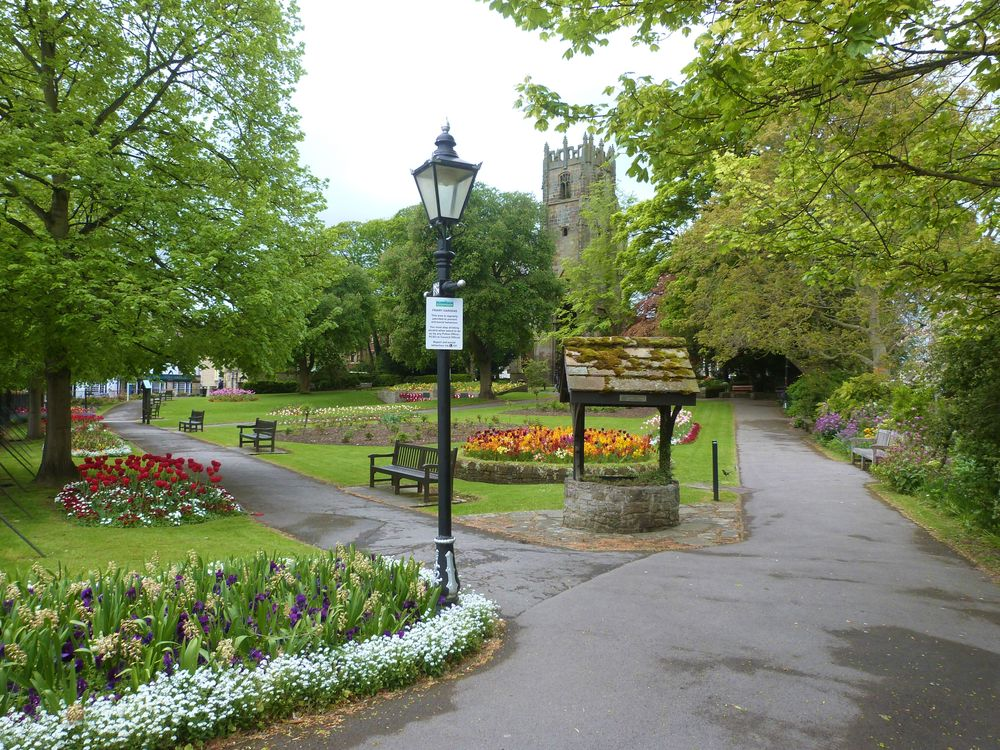
- Historic Richmond Castle Market Place Holy Trinity Church Friary Gardens

- Location within North Yorkshire
- Population: 8,413 (2011 census)
- OS grid reference: NZ170009
  - London: 210 mi (340 km) SSE
- Unitary authority: North Yorkshire
- Ceremonial county: North Yorkshire
- Region: Yorkshire and the Humber
- Country: England
- Sovereign state: United Kingdom
- Post town: RICHMOND
- Postcode district: DL10
- Dialling code: 01748
- Police: North Yorkshire
- Fire: North Yorkshire
- Ambulance: Yorkshire
- UK Parliament: Richmond and Northallerton

Richmond is a market town and civil parish in North Yorkshire, England. It is located at the point where Swaledale, the upper valley of the River Swale, opens into the Vale of Mowbray. The town's population at the 2011 census was 8,413. The town is 13 miles (21 km) north-west of Northallerton, the county town, and 41 miles (66 km) north-west of York.

In the Domesday Book of 1086 the area was collected under Yorkshire and the town was in the Gilling Wapentake. After the book it became the centre for wapentakes in the Honour of Richmond for the North Riding of Yorkshire. Between 1974 and 2023 the town was the administrative centre of the Richmondshire district of the North Yorkshire non-metropolitan county. Richmond is located near the eastern boundary of the Yorkshire Dales National Park, for which it has become a tourist centre.

== History ==
Richmond in North Yorkshire was the Honour of Richmond of the Earls of Richmond (or comtes de Richemont), a dignity also held by the Duke of Brittany from 1136 to 1399.

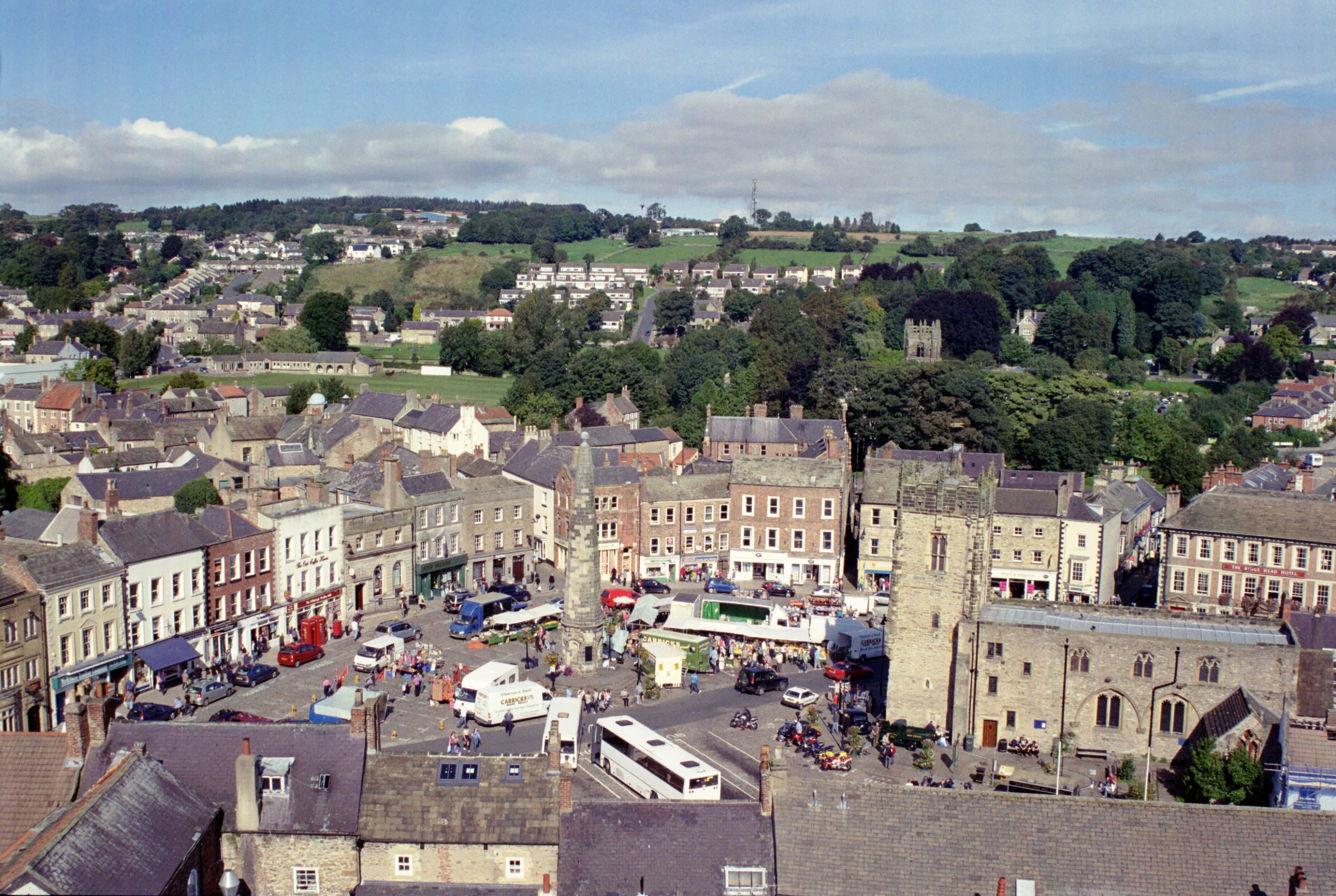
View over the Market Place

Richmond was founded in 1071 by Alan Rufus, a Breton nobleman, on lands granted to him by William the Conqueror, though it was called Hindrelag initially. The name derives from Old French "Riche and Monte", meaning "Strong Hill", and is probably named after his Richemont in Normandy. Richmond is one of the most commonly re-used English place names: there are over 56 other Richmonds around the world. Richmond Castle was completed in 1086 with a keep and walls encompassing the area now known as the Market Place.

Richmond was part of the lands of the earldom of Richmond, which was intermittently held by the Dukes of Brittany until the 14th century. John V, Duke of Brittany, died in 1399, and Henry IV took possession. Richmond is one of a few settlements that was spared from being raided by the Scots during The Great Raid of 1322 by bribing them off. In 1453, the earldom was conferred on Edmund Tudor, and it was merged with the crown when Edmund's son became King Henry VII in 1485. During the Wars of the Three Kingdoms, the Covenanter Army led by David Leslie, Lord Newark, took over the castle, and conflict ensued between local Catholics and Scottish Presbyterians.

In 1608, Robert Willance became the first alderman of Richmond, two years prior in 1606, whilst hunting on the nearby Whitcliffe Scar, the horse Willance was riding became nervous when thick mist descended, bolting over the edge and falling over 200 feet (61 m) to the valley floor, Willance survived this fall with a broken leg and erected a monument on top of the cliff as a show of gratitude for his survival. Willance died in 1616.

The prosperity of the medieval town and centre of the Swaledale wool industry greatly increased in the late 17th and 18th centuries with the burgeoning lead mining industry in nearby Arkengarthdale. It is from this period that the town's Georgian architecture originates, the most notable examples of which are to be found on Newbiggin and in Frenchgate. One of Europe's first gas works was built in the town in 1830. A permanent military presence was established in the town with the completion of Richmond Barracks in 1877.

During the First World War, Richmond's own Green Howards Regiment raised 24 battalions for the war effort, the castle assumed a role as a barracks and training camp for new recruits and members of the Non-Combatant Corps, in 1915, the first troops occupied the area south of Richmond in what was to become Catterick Camp, the planning of which was commissioned by Lord Baden Powell during his residence at the town's barracks.

In 1916, a group of "absolutist" conscientious objectors known as the Richmond Sixteen were held at the castle after refusing to undertake even non-combatant military duties. After being transported to France, they were court-martialled and formally sentenced to be executed by firing squad, but this sentence was immediately commuted to ten years' penal servitude, and the men were eventually released in 1919. Richmond Castle's 19th-century cell block continued to be used to house prisoners into the Second World War.

In June 1927, Richmond was a centre line of totality during a solar eclipse. The event is marked with a plaque at the top of Reeth Road.

== Governance ==
=== Local government ===
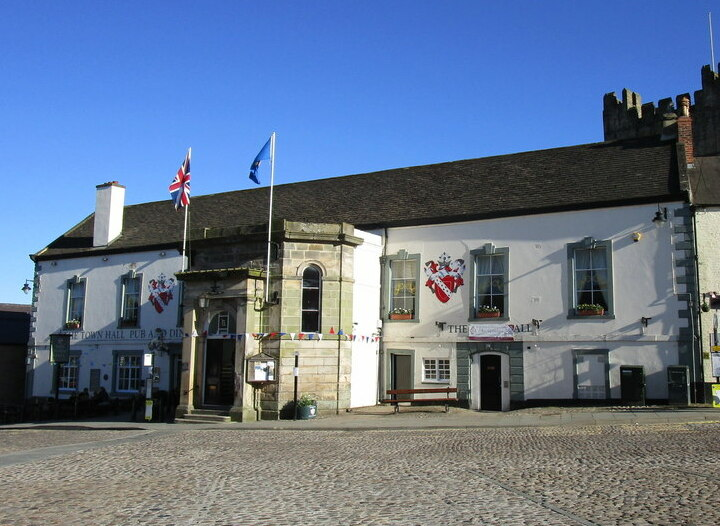
Richmond Town Hall

Richmond was located in the eponymous district of Richmondshire, created under the Local Government Act 1972 by a merger of the municipal borough of Richmond with the rural districts of Richmond, Aysgarth, Leyburn, Reeth, and part of Croft. Richmondshire was abolished in 2023, and the area is now administered by the unitary North Yorkshire Council.

The town itself is split between three local government wards, Richmond East, Richmond North, and Richmond West, however the most southerly residential areas including Holly Hill and the area surrounding the former railway station are covered by the Hipswell ward, and as a result these residents are not able to elect members of the town council. The town council consists of 15 councillors elected from the three Richmond wards, a new town mayor is elected by the council members each February and taking office in May; meetings are held at Richmond Town Hall.

=== Parliamentary representation ===
The serving member for Richmond and Northallerton constituency in Westminster is the former Prime Minister of the United Kingdom, Rishi Sunak of the Conservative Party, who has held the seat since 2015 when he succeeded former party leader and Foreign Secretary William Hague. In modern times it has been an ultra-safe seat for the Conservative Party with them having held it continually since 1910.

== Geography ==
Situated approximately 16 miles (26 km) north-west of the county town Northallerton, Richmond straddles the eastern border of the Yorkshire Dales National Park, at the edge of a valley or dale known as Swaledale, which takes its name from the river that flows through the town, said to be one of the fastest flowing in England.

The nearest official Met Office weather station to Richmond is Leeming, about 12 mi (19 km) to the south-east. Temperature extremes have ranged from 33.5 °C (92.3 °F) during August 1990, down to −17.9 °C (−0.2 °F) during December 2010.

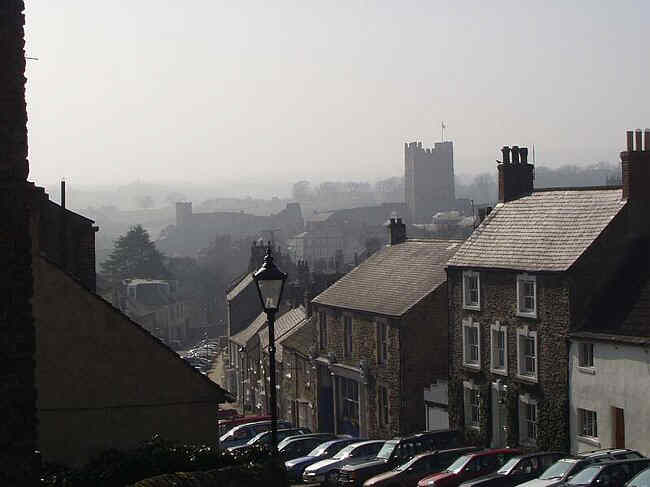
View from Frenchgate

Climate data for Leeming (North Yorkshire): Average maximum and minimum temperatures, and average rainfall recorded between 1991 and 2020 by the Met Office.elevation: 32 m (105 ft)
Month	Jan	Feb	Mar	Apr	May	Jun	Jul	Aug	Sep	Oct	Nov	Dec	Year
Mean daily maximum °C (°F)	7.0 (44.6)	7.8 (46.0)	10.2 (50.4)	13.0 (55.4)	16.0 (60.8)	18.7 (65.7)	21.0 (69.8)	20.5 (68.9)	17.9 (64.2)	13.9 (57.0)	9.9 (49.8)	7.2 (45.0)	13.6 (56.5)
Mean daily minimum °C (°F)	1.1 (34.0)	1.1 (34.0)	2.2 (36.0)	3.9 (39.0)	6.5 (43.7)	9.6 (49.3)	11.6 (52.9)	11.4 (52.5)	9.3 (48.7)	6.5 (43.7)	3.4 (38.1)	1.0 (33.8)	5.65 (42.17)
Average precipitation mm (inches)	53.8 (2.12)	44.0 (1.73)	39.4 (1.55)	46.2 (1.82)	43.8 (1.72)	58.8 (2.31)	56.2 (2.21)	65.3 (2.57)	56.9 (2.24)	65.0 (2.56)	64.8 (2.55)	59.5 (2.34)	653.7 (25.74)
Average precipitation days (≥ 1.0 mm)	12.0	10.0	8.5	9.0	8.7	9.4	9.3	10.1	9.1	11.1	12.2	11.9	121.4
Mean monthly sunshine hours	58.1	81.7	121.5	153.8	195.0	175.9	185.5	171.2	132.7	93.4	63.7	54.2	1,486.7
Source: Met Office

== Demography ==
According to the 2011 United Kingdom census, the parish of Richmond had a total resident population of 8,413, of which 4,374 females and 4,039 males. 95.8% of the population identified as white British, 1.4% as other white, 1.1% as Asian or Asian British, and 0.8% as black, Afro-Caribbean or black British. The place of birth of the town's residents was 93.8% United Kingdom, 3.3% from European Union countries, and 2.5% from elsewhere in the world. 71.7% said they had religious beliefs; 70.4% of those were Christian, 1.3% is made up of all other religions, the largest being Buddhism at 0.8%, 21.4% said they had no religion.

A quirk of the demographics in the town is that 2% of the population was born in Germany. This is a result of the nearby Catterick Garrison.

The following table shows historic population changes in the Richmond parish area between 1801 and 2011.

Population at census years
Year	1801	1811	1821	1831	1841	1851	1881	1891	1901	1911	1921	1931	1951	1961	1971	1981	1999	2001	2011
Population	2,861	3,056	3,546	3,900	3,992	4,106	4,502	4,216	3,837	3,934	3,887	4,769	6,166	5,776	7,245	7,700	8,480	8,178	8,413

== Economy ==
As a gateway town to the Yorkshire Dales, tourism is important to the local economy, but the single largest influence is the Catterick Garrison army base, which is rapidly becoming the largest population centre in Richmondshire. National chain retailers such as Lidl, WHSmith, Boots, and the Co-op, as well as local independent shops, restaurants and pubs, also provide a source of employment. The Gallowfields Trading Estate in the north of the town accommodates several builder's merchants, car garages and showrooms, a Royal Mail delivery office and a veterinarian surgery.

A traditional market still operates every Saturday in one of the largest cobbled market places in England, as well as a week round indoor one in the 19th-century Richmond Market Hall. The origins of the markets date back as far as 1093 when they were authorised by the Earls, and the first known royal charter was granted in 1155.

According to the 2011 United Kingdom census, the economic activity of residents aged 16–74 was 37.6% in full-time employment, 15.5% in part-time employment, 10.4% self-employed, 3.4% unemployed, 2.4% students with jobs, 3.6% students without jobs, 20% retired, 2.9% looking after home or family, 2.8% permanently sick or disabled, and 1.4% economically inactive for other reasons.

The average price of a house in Richmond for the 12-month period ending February 2020 was £241,583 compared to £223,537 for North Yorkshire and the national average of £232,320.

== Landmarks ==
Richmond Castle in the town centre overlooks the River Swale and is a major tourist attraction, bringing in close to 40,000 visitors a year. Scolland's Hall is the gatehouse and was staffed by the Lords of Bedale, such as Bryan FitzAlan, Lord FitzAlan, and Miles Stapleton, Founder KG. Other staff residences were Constable Burton and Thornton Steward. Also, Richmond had an extended Wensleydale castlery initially consisting of Middleham Castle, Ravensworth and Snape (Baron FitzHugh and Neville Baron Latymer). The Conyers, Wyville, Gascoigne, Stapleton and Lovell families were all notable gentry.

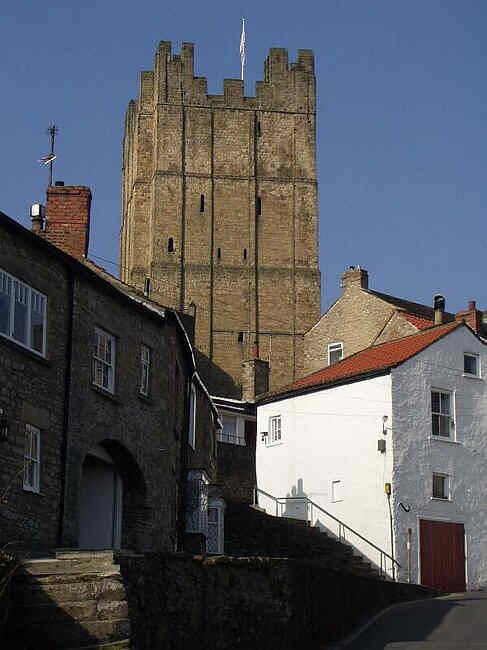
Richmond Castle

Within walking distance from the town centre are the ruins of the premonstratensian Easby Abbey, managed by English Heritage, and adjacent Easby Hall, built in 1729. A popular town legend tells the story of the Little Drummer Boy, a young member of an 18th-century regiment who was sent by soldiers to investigate a tunnel leading away from the castle towards Easby, playing his drum to guide the soldiers above ground, however the drums ceased suddenly and the boy was never seen or located since, a stone marker stands at the point at which the boy's drumming stopped, on a footpath between the town and Easby.

Richmond Market Cross or "obelisk" was built in 1771 to replace the medieval cross that stood before it. On the south-west side of the town stands the folly of Culloden Tower, originally built in 1746 to commemorate the Duke of Cumberland's at the Battle of Culloden, after falling into disrepair it was restored in 1981 and now is used a holiday let. Another small folly is Oliver Duckett on the northern outskirts of the town, a rounded bastion tower, built from the same stone as Richmond Castle and now lying on public land.

Swale House on Frenchgate, built around 1750, was home to the headmaster and students of the nearby grammar school, before being used as a hospital for wounded officers in the First World War. For many years, it was the headquarters of Richmondshire District Council, before being closed and sold off in 2013. Millgate House bed & breakfast has received mentions in several national publications for its accompanying gardens.

There are two war memorials sited in Richmond. The Gallowgate Memorial stands overlooking Frenchgate, taking the form of a Celtic cross and is dedicated to the losses suffered by the Green Howards regiment during both the First and Second World Wars; the other monument commissioned is located in the friary gardens and commemorates all of the victims of the two World Wars who resided in Richmond.

Richmond Falls are a short walk from the town centre and to the west of the town, on the road to Marske, is the unusually named Richmond Out Moor.

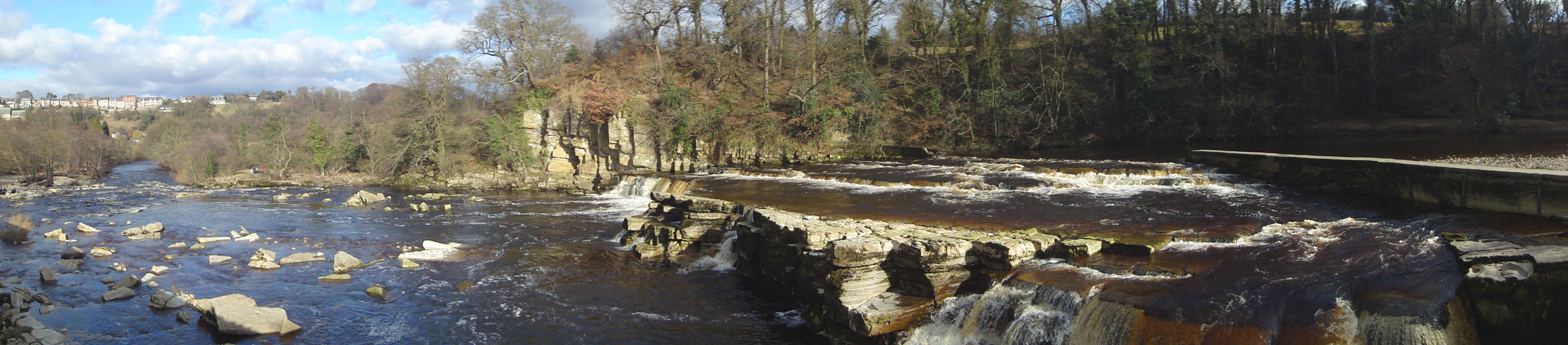
Panorama of Richmond falls, close to the town centre

=== Religious sites ===
There are four extant churches within the town, the Church of England's St Mary the Virgin, the Roman Catholic St Joseph and St Francis Xavier, Richmond Methodist Church and Influence Church, formed in 1950 as Richmond Pentecostal Church. Former religious buildings and structures include Holy Trinity Church a Grade I listed building in the centre of the market place, no longer conducting regular services, the 15th century bell tower of the former friary of Greyfriars, stands over an area of public green space, known as the Friary Gardens, and a former United Reformed Church building on Dundas Street.

== Transport ==
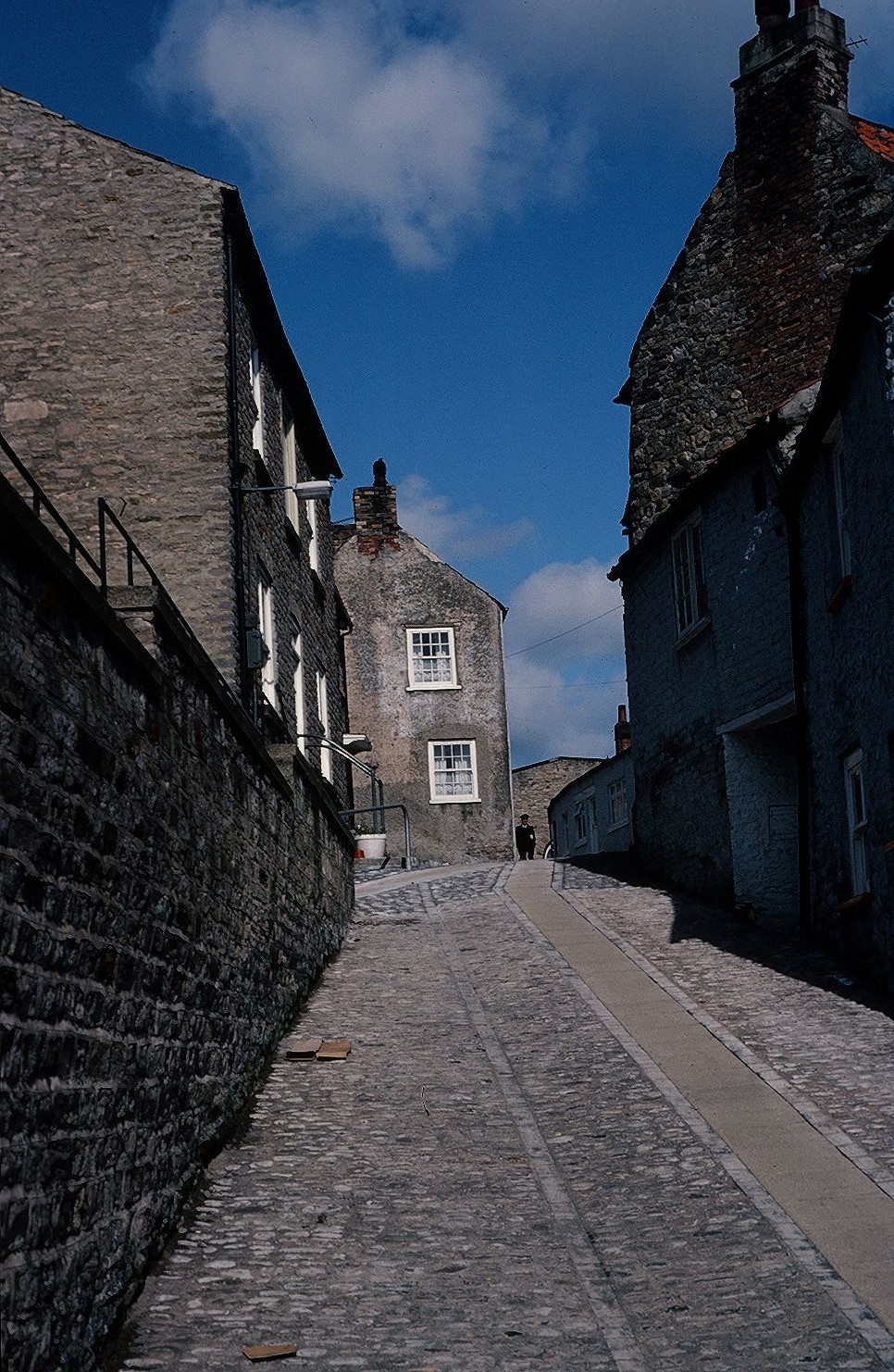
Alley in Richmond

Richmond Railway Station opened in 1846 and closed in 1968, a year before the branch line itself was taken out of service. After the station closed, the building was used for many years as a garden centre. After renovation by the Richmondshire Building Preservation Trust it opened in 2007 as "The Station", a mixed-use space for community and commercial activities. The nearest main line station to Richmond is now Darlington on the East Coast Main Line, 13 miles (21 km) north-east.

The town is served by Arriva North East buses to Darlington and Catterick Garrison, as well as links to Barnard Castle and Northallerton provided by Hodgsons and routes to Leyburn and Ripon by Dales & District, along with council run services that serve Richmond's residential areas. The Little White Bus connects Richmond with the villages of Swaledale as far west as Keld and is operated solely by volunteer drivers.

Richmond has two four digit A-roads passing through it; the A6108 is the main entry route from the A1(M) junction at Scotch Corner, and continues west towards Leyburn and then Ripon. The A6136 connects to nearby Catterick Garrison across Mercury Bridge that spans the River Swale. Mercury Bridge is grade II listed, and as its original name of Station Bridge suggests, it was built to give vehicular access to the railway station. In June 2000, heavy flooding resulted in the bridge suffering considerable structural damage to one side, repairs were made at a cost of approximately £500,000 and the bridge re-opened to traffic in December of the same year.

The closest airport is Teesside International Airport just to the east of Darlington, approximately 18 miles (29 km) north-east.

== Education ==
The town is home to two secondary schools: Richmond School, a large school and sixth form with specialisms in performing arts, science, and mathematics, and St Francis Xavier School, which is a smaller, voluntary aided, joint Roman Catholic and Church of England School for boys and girls aged 11–16.

There are also three non-sectarian primary schools: Trinity Academy (formerly Richmond C of E), Richmond Methodist School, and St Mary's Roman Catholic School.

== Sport and culture ==
=== Sport ===
The town's football club, Richmond Town F.C., was founded in 1945 and they currently play in the Wearside League in level 7 of the National League System with their games being held at the Earl's Orchard ground, the pavilion was officially opened in March 1975 by then Middlesbrough F.C. manager Jack Charlton.

Richmond is also home to Richmondshire Rugby Union Football club, currently playing in Durham/Northumberland 3.

Richmondshire Cricket Club play in the North Yorkshire and South Durham Cricket League, where they have won the league title a total of five times and the ECB National Club Cricket Championship once, in 2018.

Richmond was also the starting point for the third stage of the 2018 Tour de Yorkshire road cycling race.

The town's racecourse opened in 1765 and closed in 1891, but the site is still used for horse training and by the public for walking. The poor condition of the grandstand led it to appear on Historic England's Heritage at Risk register in 2019.

=== Media and filmography ===
The town is served by two local newspapers, North Yorkshire editions of the daily Northern Echo and the weekly Darlington & Stockton Times both published by Newsquest.

Local news and television programmes are by BBC North East and Cumbria and ITV Tyne Tees. Television signals are received from the Bilsdale TV transmitter.

The town is served by both BBC Radio York on 104.3 FM and BBC Radio Tees 95.0 FM. Other radio stations including Greatest Hits Radio York and North Yorkshire on 103.5 FM, Nation Radio North East on 103.2 FM and Sun FM on 102.6 FM.

Richmond has been used as a filming location for a number of television programmes and films including The Fast Show, Century Falls, Earthfasts, A Woman of Substance (1984) and All Creatures Great and Small.

=== Arts ===
The official gallery of Middlesbrough-born artist Mackenzie Thorpe is located in the town. Richmond local Lucy Pittaway was also chosen as the official artist for the Tour de Yorkshire from 2016 to 2018.

Richmondshire Concerts is a classical music society that puts on six concerts a year, generally of chamber music, at the Influence Church. The society has an average of 250 annual subscribers from North Yorkshire and the North East.

Richmond Live was an annual music festival held every August on a riverside venue known as "The Batts", notable headliners included The Lightning Seeds and The Hoosiers. The festival was cancelled permanently by the organisers following the 2019 event due to a lack of sustainability.

=== Cinema and theatre ===
Richmond has a three-screen cinema that opened in 2007 in the former railway station the town was also home to the one screen Zetland Cinema, between from 1937 until its closure in 1983, the building was then sold to become a religious centre for the local Pentecostal Church, as of 2020 it is owned by the Influence Church, and also houses a food bank serving the local area.

The Georgian Theatre Royal in Richmond, built in 1788, is the UK's most complete 18th century theatre. A decline in the fortunes of theatre led to closure in 1848 and it was used as a warehouse until 1963 when the theatre was restored and reopened, with a museum added in 1979, After renovation in 2003, a new block providing services and access was added next to the original auditorium.

=== Community ===
The Richmond Meet is an annual fair taking place every Whit Monday, consisting of a parade and the arrival of amusement rides into the market place, in 2019 it ran for the 127th time, but was cancelled in 2020 and 2021 due to the COVID-19 pandemic.

Richmond has been twinned with Vinstra, Norway since 1988, and Saint-Aubin-du-Cormier, France since 2006.

== Public services ==
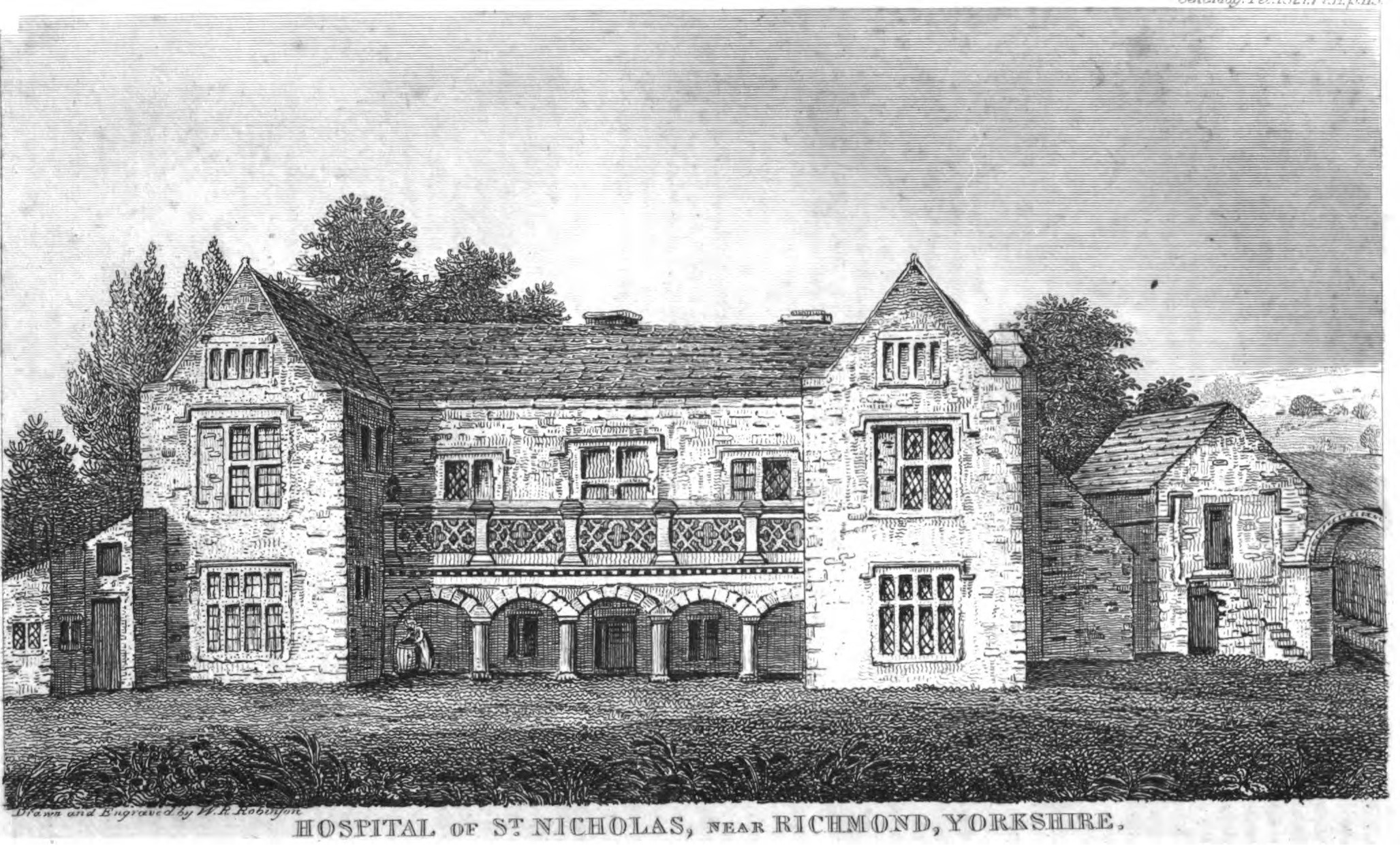
Hospital of St. Nicholas, near Richmond, Yorkshire (p.112, February 1824)

The town is served by the Friary Community Hospital, officially opened in 1999 and managed by South Tees Hospitals NHS Foundation Trust. It provides non-emergency care and general practice, the Victoria Ward in the hospital contains 18 beds, for purposes such as acute illnesses, rehabilitation and palliative care. The Victoria Hospital, served as a main health facility from when it opened as the Richmond Cottage Hospital in 1899 until its closure in 1999, coinciding with the opening of the Friary building, the premises is now in use as funeral director's offices, a few yards down the road from the old Victoria Hospital is the town's smaller general practitioner, the Quakers Lane Surgery. The historic St. Nicholas House, on the eastern outskirts of the town was once the site of a benedictine hospital dating back to 1137.

The local ambulances are run by the Yorkshire Ambulance Service, the town is also in the catchment area of the Great North Air Ambulance. North Yorkshire Police and North Yorkshire Fire and Rescue Service both have stations in the town within the same complex on I'Anson Road, water is supplied by Yorkshire Water.

Richmond Information Centre is based in the town's Victorian-era Market Hall. Having previously been run by Richmondshire District Council, RIC is now a non-profit volunteer-run organisation, dedicated to "welcoming visitors and locals alike", which provides advice on attractions and services across a wide area, including the whole of the Yorkshire Dales National Park.

== Notable people ==
=== Born in Richmond ===
- Rob Andrew, former rugby union international
- Peter Auty, opera singer who sang the song "Walking In The Air" from the TV film The Snowman
- George Bell, publisher, founder of George Bell & Sons
- Amanda Sonia Berry, CEO of the Royal Foundation
- Francis Blackburne, archdeacon and dissenter
- John Brasse, writer
- William Brice, ethnographer
- Samuel and Nathaniel Buck, engravers and printmakers
- George Cuitt the Younger, painter
- George Errington, Roman Catholic archbishop
- John James Fenwick, founder of Fenwick's department stores
- Henry Greathead, inventor of the lifeboat
- Anthony Hammond, legal writer
- Thomas Harrison, architect
- Herbert Sedgwick, first-class cricketer
- Theo Hutchcraft, one half of synth-pop duo, Hurts
- Francis Johnson, dissenter
- John Lawrence, 1st Baron Lawrence, viceroy of India
- Robert Lawrence Ottley, theologian
- Zoe Lee, European champion rower and Olympic silver medallist
- George McGuigan, rugby player
- Conyers Middleton, clergyman
- Tanya Bardsley, model
- Tim Rodber, rugby union international
- Edward Roper, first-class cricketer
- Fran Summers, model
- James Tate, headmaster
- Thomas Taylor, clergyman

=== Residents ===
- Lord Baden-Powell, Founder of the scouting movement
- Robert Barclay Allardice, pedestrian, educated at Richmond School
- John Bathurst, physician to Oliver Cromwell
- Marcus Beresford, Primate of All Ireland
- Lewis Carroll, author, attended Richmond School and lived in nearby Croft-on-Tees.
- Henry Butler Clarke, historian of Spain
- J. R. Cohu, headmaster of Richmond School
- Edward Ellerton, educational philanthropist, was educated at Richmond School.
- Charles Grey, 2nd Earl Grey, British Prime Minister, was educated at Richmond School
- Brenda Hale, Baroness Hale of Richmond, a Justice of the Supreme Court of the United Kingdom
- Angela Harris, Baroness Harris of Richmond, Deputy Speaker in the House of Lords
- Thomas Hounsfield, first-class cricketer
- Samuel Howitt, painter
- Peter Inge, Baron Inge, former head of the British army and colonel of the Green Howards (1982–1994)
- Joanne Jackson, Olympic swimmer
- Philip Mayne, last surviving British officer of the First World War
- William Young Ottley, writer on art and collector, was educated at Richmond School.
- George Peacock, mathematician, attended a school in Richmond, one of "Tate's invincibles".
- Donald Peers, singer
- James Raine, antiquarian, was educated at Richmond School, one of "Tate's invincibles"
- Peter Robinson, author, DCI Banks series
- Thomas Sedgwick, clergyman
- Richard Sheepshanks, astronomer, was educated at Richmond School, one of "Tate's invincibles".
- T. H. Stokoe, head of Richmond school
- Mackenzie Thorpe, artist
- Stanley Vann, composer
- John Warburton, herald and antiquary
- Tim Clissold, author
- Simon Topping, vocalist, musician and founding member of Factory band 'A Certain Ratio', who later formed T-Coy and joined Quando Quango

== Arms ==
Coat of arms of Richmond Town Council

Notes
First recorded 21 August 1665. Granted to the Borough of Richmond 4 August 1959. Transferred to successor parish 16 April 1975
Crest
Out of an ancient crown Or a rose Argent barbed and seeded Proper.
Escutcheon
Gules an orle Argent over all a bend Ermine.
