= Green Bridge (England) =

Road bridge in North Yorkshire, England

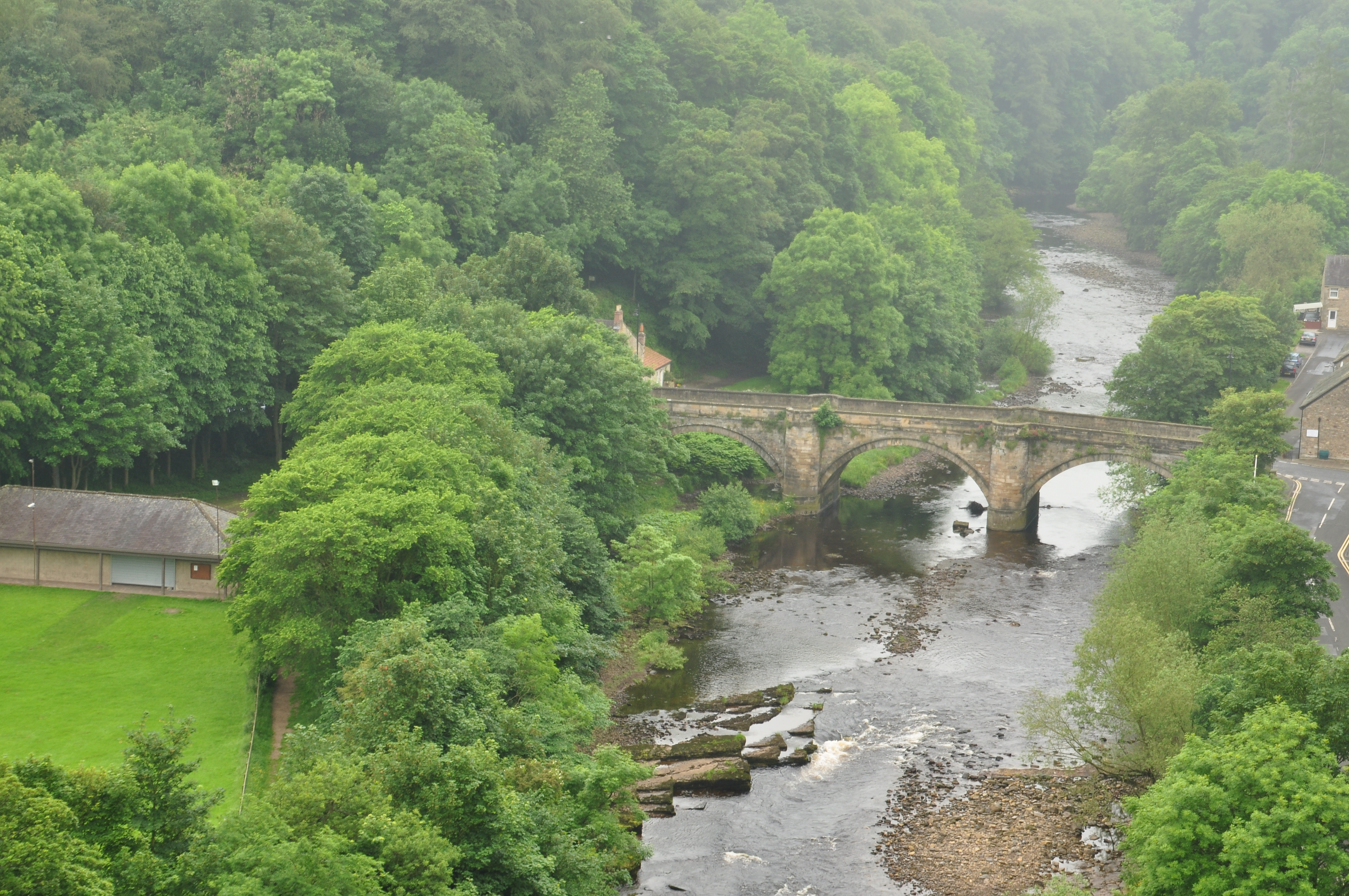
- Green Bridge from the castle
- Coordinates: 54.4005°N 1.7403°W
- OS grid reference: NZ169005
- Crosses: River Swale
- Locale: Richmond, North Yorkshire, England
- Other name: Richmond Bridge
- Named for: Bargate Green

Characteristics
- Piers in water: 2

History
- Architect: John Carr
- Opened: 1789

Statistics

Listed Building – Grade II*
- Designated: 1 August 1952
- Reference no.: 1318388

Location
- Interactive map of Green Bridge

Green Bridge (also known as Richmond Bridge) is a road bridge crossing the River Swale in Richmond, North Yorkshire, England. Until the building of Mercury Bridge adjacent to the railway station in 1846, it was the only crossing over the River Swale from Richmond. Historically, the bridge carried the Richmond to Lancaster Turnpike, and is now a Grade II* listed structure.

== History ==
The bridge, which is sometimes known as Richmond Bridge, was historically known as the Green Bridge as it connected Richmond Green (Bargate) with the south side of the River Swale. The old bridge was known to have been in place at least as far back as 1535, and was narrower than the current bridge. It had four arches (compared to the current bridge's three), and also housed a small building in the middle of the bridge on the upstream side for a watchman to maintain an early alarm in case of any danger. This bridge is shown on John Speed's map of Richmond dated to 1610, and in 1751, it became a vital crossing in the newly created Richmond to Lancaster Turnpike.

Tolls were levied on corn and any cattle being taken across the bridge, which in 1622 was rated at 44 shillings per year. Flooding in 1771 damaged the old bridge, and this prompted the authorities to have a new bridge built at a cost of £1,800. The Green Bridge was practically the only structure not washed away in the great floods of 1771, but it needed constant attention until the new bridge was built in 1789. The foundations of the old bridge are visible on the upstream side during periods of low water.

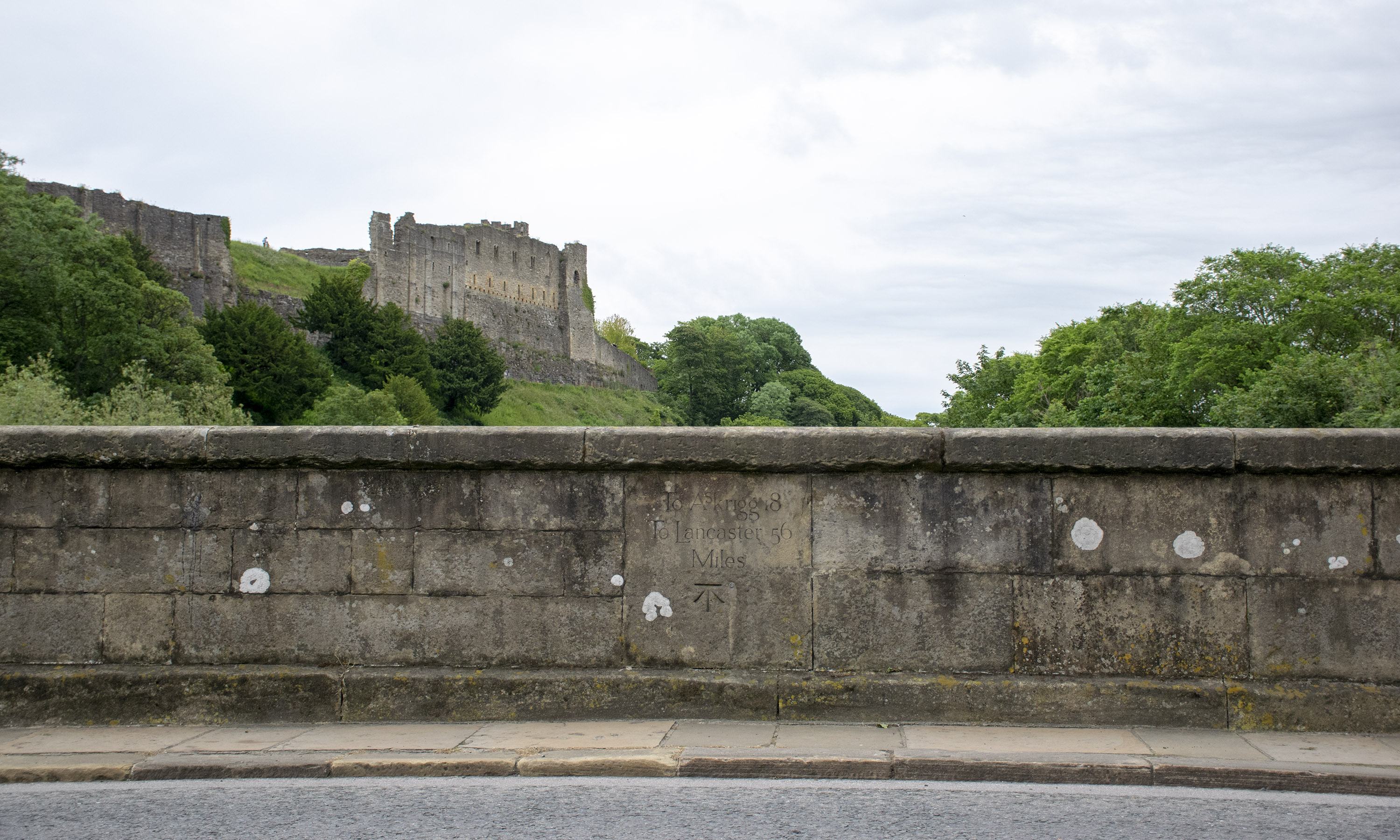
Green Bridge at Richmond, which straddles the River Swale

The bridge of 1789 was designed by John Carr, and has what Pevsner describes as "..three beautiful segmented arches and rounded cutwaters." However, besides carrying the Richmond to Lancaster Turnpike, the river bridge was the dividing point between the old Borough of Richmond and the North Riding authorities, so they each advertised for a contractor separately, which led to the Richmond side having three layers of stone on the bridge's parapets, whilst the North Riding side had two layers only. This bridge has two piers in the water, and each of the three arches is of a different span length to the other two. The bridge is 186 feet (57 m) long, 20 feet 8 inches (6.30 m) wide, with one walkway being 2 feet 8 inches (0.81 m), and the other 3 feet 1 inch (0.94 m).

The Bridge is made from ashlar stone quarried at Gatherley Moor, and has three moulded arches, each with rounded bays over the piers. The quarry was re-opened in 2001, and stone won from the site has been used to repair the bridge. A study conducted on the site in 1976 during a period of extremely low water revealed evidence of the bases of three previous piers in the water immediately upstream of the present bridge.

Richmond Bridge is the starting point for the annual Richmond Duck Race, which sees 2,000 sponsored plastic ducks tipped into the river, with the finishing line being Mercury Bridge (Station Bridge) downstream. The Green Bridge is a Grade II* listed structure, and a scheduled monument. The bridge carries an unclassified road up a hill known as Slee Gill.

== See also ==
- Grade II* listed buildings in North Yorkshire (district)
- Listed buildings in Richmond, North Yorkshire
- Listed buildings in St Martin's, North Yorkshire
- List of crossings of the River Swale

Bridges over the River Swale
Upstream: Lownethwaite Bridge	Downstream: Mercury Bridge
