= A6055 road =

A-road in North Yorkshire, England

A6055

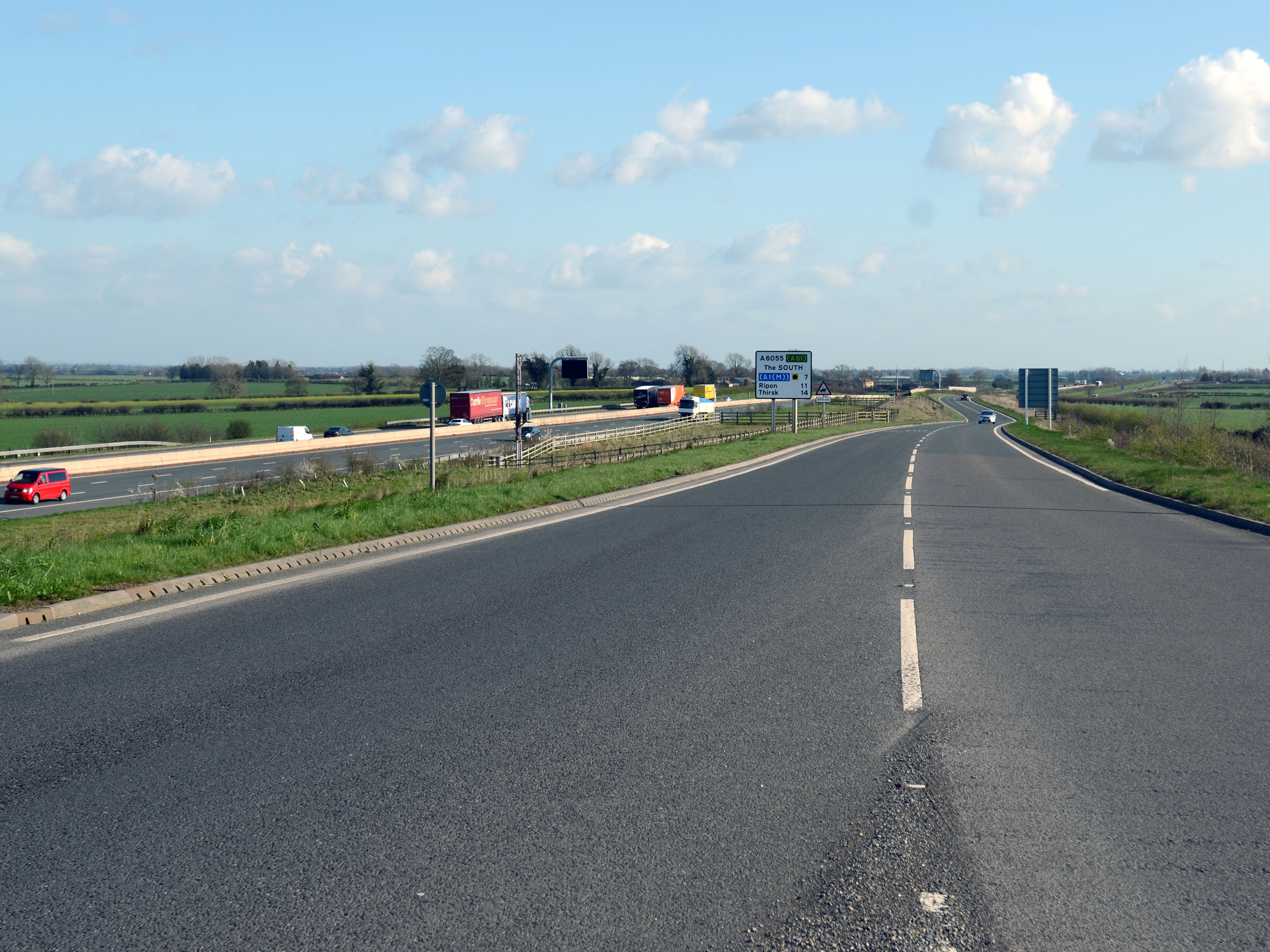
- A6055 road looking south at the turning for RAF Leeming and Gatenby. The A1(M) is adjacent.

Route information
- Length: 25 mi (40 km)

Major junctions
- Southwest end: Knaresborough
- A59 A1(M) A168; A61 A684 A1(M) A1(M) A6136 A6108 A1(M); A66
- North end: Barton, North Yorkshire

Location
- Country: United Kingdom
- Primary destinations: Boroughbridge; Minskip; Ferrensby; Leeming Bar; Catterick Bridge; Scotch Corner

Road network
- Roads in the United Kingdom; Motorways; A and B road zones

The A6055 is a 25-mile (40 km) stretch of road in North Yorkshire that runs from Knaresborough to Boroughbridge, with a break, then starts up again at Junction 50 of the A1(M) to run parallel with A1(M) acting as a Local Access Road (LAR) going between Junction 50 and 56 at Barton. Responsibility for the route rests with the Highways Agency, as it is designated as a primary route associated with the A1(M) upgrade.

== Route ==
It runs in a North-northeast direction from the A59 at Bond End in Knaresborough where it is called Boroughbridge Road, through the Stockwells Estate. It exits Knaresborough just past Greengate Lane where it turns directly north, before once again resuming a northeasterly direction at a sharp bend on the junction with Farnham Lane. It passes the Knaresborough Golf Club, before going through Ferrensby Lodge, and taking another Northerly turn before reaching Ferrensby itself. Beyond Ferrensby the road is called Harrogate Road, and it continues in a more or less exact northeasterly direction from Ferrensby to Spellow Hill, near Staveley, at which point it resumes its due North direction through Minskip, before turning Northeast one final time to its former terminus at junction 48 of the A1(M), just outside Boroughbridge. From here it runs in multiplex with the A1(M) for two junctions to junction 50 at Baldersby Gate Interchange. Northwards from here it follows the line of the former northbound carriageway of the A1, save for a few deviations onto the former southbound line, to a new terminus at Leeming Junction.

The A6055 continues north on the western side of the newly opened A1(M), crossing over the new route in the Killerby Hall area and then taking the route of the old A1 road past Catterick to a new junction with the A6136 road on the western side of the A1(M). It then heads north through Catterick Bridge, switching to the west side and then northward up to Scotch Corner. Going north from Scotch Corner up to Barton Interchange it is firstly on the west side before transferring to the east side via an overbridge where it takes the formation of Kneeton Lane before meeting with the B6275 just east of Barton Interchange. Work on this new section, and on the A1(M) upgrade and associated junctions was expected to be finished by the end of 2017. However, delays to the A1(M) Leeming to Barton upgrade meant the full road opened up to traffic between Catterick Bridge, Brompton-on-Swale, Scotch Corner and Barton on 26 February 2018. This was still a full month before the adjacent A1(M) motorway was fully open.

Between junctions 50 and 56 (Barton), the road has an additional name of LAR, Local Access Route.

== As the former A1 ==
Prior to 2012, there was no continuous motorway-standard section of the A1(M) between the junction with the A168 road and Scotch Corner, near Barton. This gap was served by the original alignment of the A1 road, which was a dual carriageway but featured at-grade junctions rather than full grade separation.

Following completion of the A1(M) upgrade through this section during the mid-2010s, the former A1 route was downgraded to a single carriageway and reclassified as the A6055 road. It now functions primarily as a local access route and as an alternative for non-motorway traffic, reconnecting with the A1(M) at Scotch Corner.

== Safety and traffic flows ==
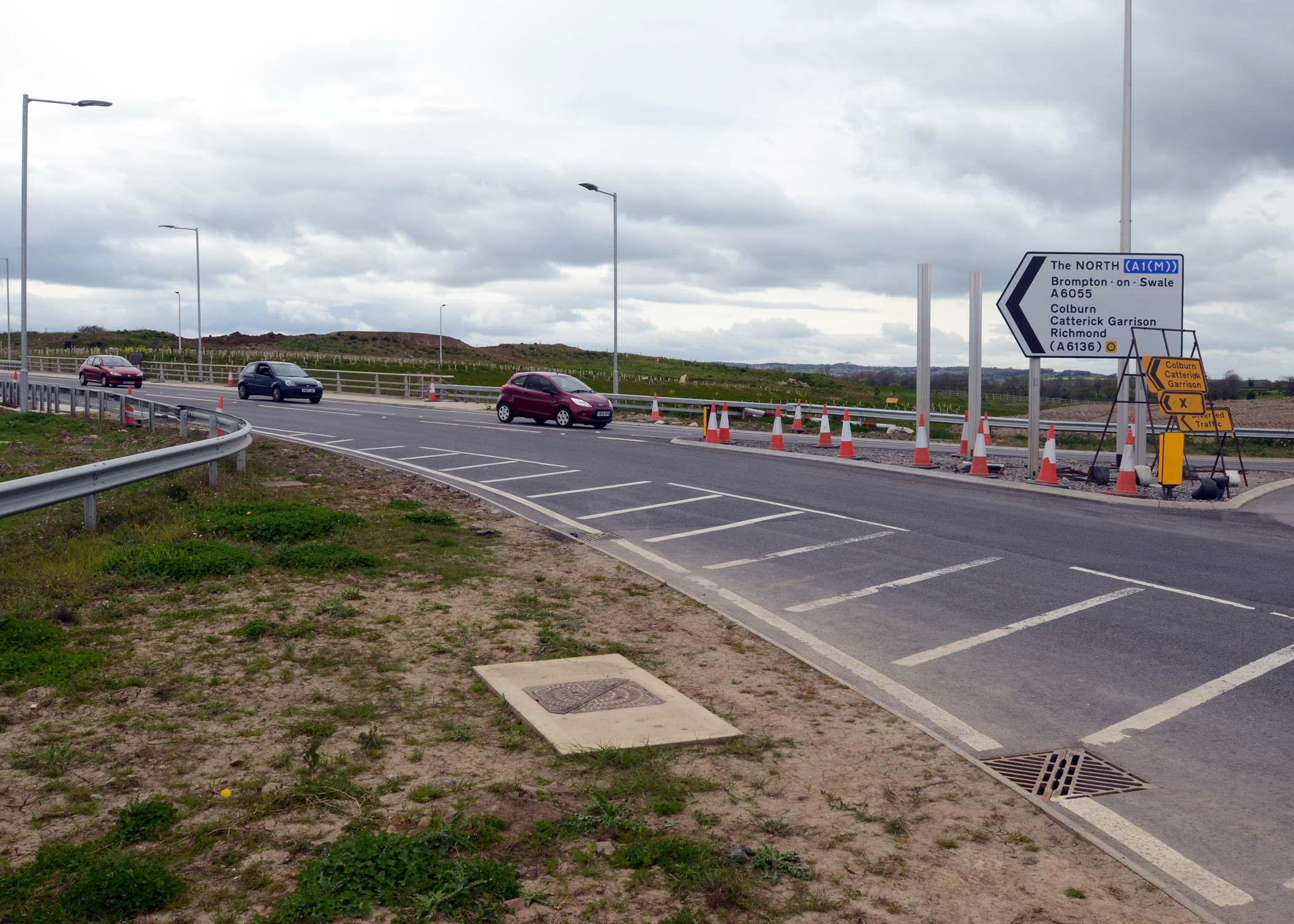
The new roundabout on the newly opened A6055 junction above the A1(M) west of Catterick village. The A1(M) is below the bridge where the two cars on the left are.

The stretch of road between Knaresborough and Boroughbridge has been described as "notorious" on account of its safety issues and local residents have asked for speed limits and traffic calming measures. On this section, average traffic flow per day rose from 5,397 vehicles in 2000 to 7,982 vehicles in 2014.

The average volume of daily traffic at the A6055 just south of the A684 junction was 4,730 in 2013 and 6,789 in 2014.

The A6055 now takes the route of the former A6136 road through Catterick Bridge and continues through the old northern junction on the A1 road and forms a Local Access Route (LAR) on the western side of the A1(M) where it joins the A6108 road just south of Scotch Corner. To necessitate these changes, and with traffic flow being heavier on the A6055, the priorities at the bridge over the River Swale in Catterick Bridge have been changed. The junction used to have a priority for traffic travelling from Catterick village to Catterick Bridge as one fork of the A6136; this was changed amidst much local opposition.
