= Listed buildings in St Martin's, North Yorkshire =

St Martin's is a civil parish in the county of North Yorkshire, England. It contains eleven listed buildings that are recorded in the National Heritage List for England. Of these, one is listed at Grade I, the highest of the three grades, two are at Grade II*, the middle grade, and the others are at Grade II, the lowest grade. The parish contains no settlements, and its most important building is St. Martin's Priory, the ruins of which are listed. Also in the parish is the former Richmond railway station, and its associated listed buildings are the station building, the engine shed, a gas house, and houses for the employees. The other listed buildings are a house and two bridges.

== Key ==
Grade	Criteria
I	Buildings of exceptional interest, sometimes considered to be internationally important
II*	Particularly important buildings of more than special interest
II	Buildings of national importance and special interest

== Buildings ==
Name and location	Photograph	Date	Notes	Grade
St. Martin's Priory; 54.40195°N 1.72788°W		12th century (or before)	The priory remains are in sandstone. The former church walls contain a round-arched doorway with two orders and scalloped capitals. A tower-like structure, dating from the 15th century, has three storeys, one bay and quoins. It contains a doorway with a pointed arch and a chamfered moulded surround, a cross window above, and a vent on the top floor.	I
St Martins House and walls 54.39848°N 1.72118°W		Early 18th century	The house is in sandstone on a plinth, with chamfered rusticated quoins, a cornice, a parapet with moulded coping and pedestals carrying ball finials, and an M-shaped tile roof with moulded coping. In the centre is a portico with three-quarter Roman Doric columns, a Doric frieze, a cornice and a pediment, flanked by canted bay windows, The upper floor has sash windows in architraves, the middle one eared and shouldered. At the rear is a stair Venetian window with Tuscan capitals and a keystone. The house is flanked by screen walls containing doorways with quoined surrounds and keystones.	II
Richmond Bridge; 54.40046°N 1.74034°W		1789	The bridge, which carries a road over the River Swale, was designed by John Carr. It is in stone, and consists of three moulded segmental arches with round cutwaters. The bridge has a plain stone parapet and capping.	II*
Former Engine Shed; 54.40277°N 1.72783°W		c. 1846	The engine shed was built for the Great North of England Railway and designed by G. T. Andrews. It is in sandstone, with quoins and a hipped Welsh slate roof. There is a single storey and eight bays. On the front are three doorways, and on the front and rear are windows, all with quoined surrounds and segmental heads. On the returns are blocked engine openings.	II
Former Gas House; 54.40243°N 1.72664°W		c. 1846	The gas house was built for the Great North of England Railway and designed by G. T. Andrews. It is in sandstone, with quoins and a hipped Welsh slate roof. There is a single storey and three bays. On the front are three round-arched openings with quoined surrounds. The middle opening has a doorway, and the outer bays have double arches and are partly blocked with glazed tympani above. On the roof is a raised ventilator.	II
Former Richmond railway station 54.40299°N 1.72961°W		c. 1846	The railway station was built for the Great North of England Railway, designed by G. T. Andrews, and later used for other purposes. It is in sandstone, the station building on a plinth, with quoins and a Welsh slate roof. There is a single storey, the office range has eleven bays, with a five-bay porte-cochère on the left, and behind is a nine-bay train shed. The porte-cochère has an arcade of moulded four-centred arches, buttresses, a string course with gargoyles, and a parapet. The office block has mullioned and transomed windows and a canted bay window. The train shed has a glazed roof.	II*
Mercury Bridge; 54.40396°N 1.73083°W		c. 1846	The bridge carries Station Road (A6136 road) over the River Swale. It was designed by G. T. Andrews, and is in sandstone. It consists of four segmental-pointed double-chamfered arches, with a band, and shields over the centre of the piers. The piers have small cutwaters, under the parapet is a Lombard frieze, and the parapets have triangular coping. Over each pier is a corbelled base for a lamp, and at the ends of the parapets are octagonal terminals with corniced moulded conical caps.	II
Pegasus House; 54.40368°N 1.72908°W		c. 1846	The house, designed by G. T. Andrews, is in stone on a plinth, with quoins and a Welsh slate roof. There are two storeys, a L-shaped plan, and two bays, the right bay projecting under a gable. The doorway has a quoined surrounded and a triangular head, some windows have triangular heads and the others are mullioned, and in the gable is a blocked vent.	II
Station Cottages; 54.40232°N 1.72838°W		c. 1846	A terrace of six cottages designed by G. T. Andrews, they are in sandstone, with quoins, buttresses at the ends, and a Welsh slate roof . There are two storeys, six bays, and a rear outshut. The doorways have triangular heads, the windows are mullioned, and all the openings have quoined surrounds. Above are gables with bargeboards and an apex pendant.	II
Station House; 54.40290°N 1.73047°W		c. 1846	The former stationmaster's house was designed by G. T. Andrews. It is in sandstone on a plinth, with quoins, a string course, and a Welsh slate roof with finials, the central one octagonal and embattled. There are two storeys and an L-shaped plan, with three bays and a rear wing on the left. The middle bay is gabled and projects slightly. It contains a doorway with a quoined surround and a triangular head, and above it is a hood mould stepped up over a carving of a scroll. The windows have quoined surrounds and are mullioned, the window above the doorway in a relieving arch, and the gable has decorative bargeboards and a finial and pendant.	II
