= Bridge House Hotel =

Building in North Yorkshire, England

Coordinates: 54.3888°N 1.6507°W

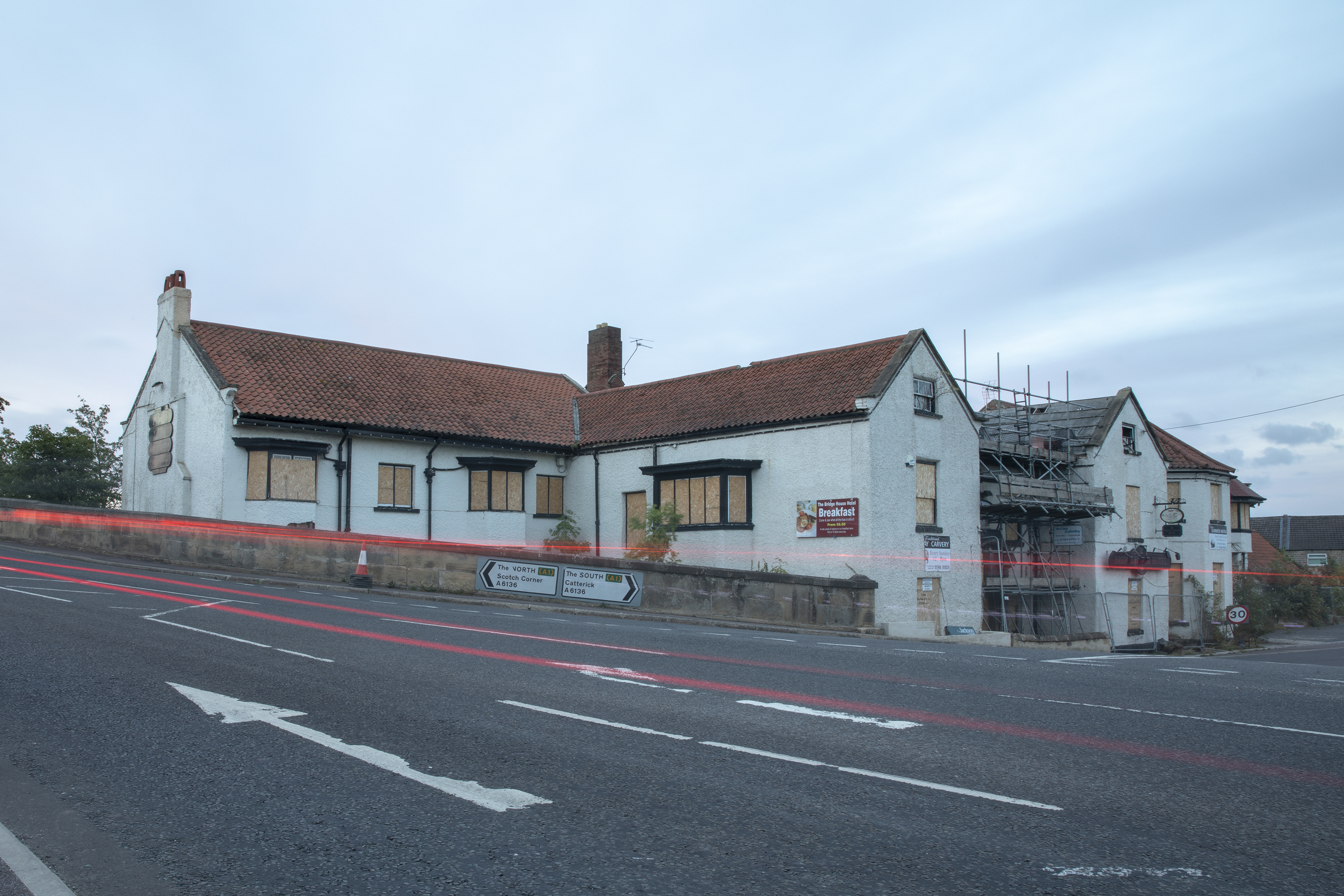
The building, in 2018

The Bridge House Hotel is a former hotel in Catterick Bridge, a village in North Yorkshire in England.

The building was constructed as a coaching inn, at the southern end of Catterick Bridge, in the 17th century. It was originally named the "George and Dragon", and succeeded an earlier building, named by John Leland in the 16th century. The building was altered and extended in the late 18th century. In the late 19th century, it was converted into a private house, but in the 20th century was converted back into a hotel, the "Bridge House Hotel", also spending some time as the "Catterick Bridge Hotel". It was undergoing renovations in 2014, when it was badly damaged in a fire. It was then further damaged by vandals, and was sold in both 2022 and 2023. In 2024, plans were submitted to demolish the worst-affected parts of the building, at the rear, and mostly dating from the 20th century, restore the remainder, convert it into apartments, and build additional housing on the rest of the site.

The building is roughcast and has pantile roofs with stone copings and shaped kneelers, and there are two storeys. The central part has a U-shaped plan, with a range of two bays and projecting gabled wings with attics, and there are later added ranges. In the middle is a doorway with pilasters and a segmental pediment containing a coat of arms, and the windows are sashes. In the right range is a semicircular-headed porch and a canted bay window, and in the left range are oriel windows. It has been Grade II listed since 1977.

== See also ==
- Listed buildings in Brough with St Giles
