= Listed buildings in Brough with St Giles =

Brough with St Giles is a civil parish in the county of North Yorkshire, England. It contains twelve listed buildings that are recorded in the National Heritage List for England. Of these, one is listed at Grade I, the highest of the three grades, two are at Grade II*, the middle grade, and the others are at Grade II, the lowest grade. The parish contains the village of Brough with St Giles, the hamlet of Catterick Bridge, and the surrounding area. The listed buildings include houses and associated structures, a farmhouse, a hotel, bridges, and a church with associated buildings.

== Key ==
Grade	Criteria
I	Buildings of exceptional interest, sometimes considered to be internationally important
II*	Particularly important buildings of more than special interest
II	Buildings of national importance and special interest

== Buildings ==
Name and location	Photograph	Date	Notes	Grade
Catterick Bridge; 54.38936°N 1.65147°W		1422	The bridge, which carries Catterick Road (A6136 road) over the River Swale, has been altered, including widening in 1792 by John Carr, is in sandstone and consists of three arches. It has triangular cutwaters with hollow chamfered tops, rising to canted pedestrian retreats, a band, and parapets with triangular coping, ending in circular bollards.	II*
Brough Hall; 54.37551°N 1.66942°W		15th century	A country house that has been altered and extended, and later converted into apartments. It is in sandstone, partly roughcast, with Westmorland slate roofs. In the centre is a tower house with three storeys and three bays, the outer bays slightly projecting and gabled, flanked by two-storey bays, and with a rear stair tower. On each side of these are two-storey five-bay blocks, the east block with a chapel wing. In the centre of the main block is a Doric portico and a doorway in an architrave, above which is a Venetian window with voussoirs in a round-arched recess. The other windows in the block are round-arched sashes in architraves, and above them is a modillion cornice and gable pediments, and a parapet with moulded coping. At the rear are quoins, blocked mullioned and transomed windows, and a doorway with a quoined chamfered surround and a triangular head. In the stair tower is a Tuscan Venetian window with a pediment on a balustraded dado, and a Diocletian window.	I
Catterick Bridge Hotel; 54.38878°N 1.65069°W		17th century	Originally a coaching inn, the hotel has been altered and extended. It is roughcast and has pantile roofs with stone copings and shaped kneelers, and there are two storeys. The central part has a U-shaped plan, with a range of two bays and projecting gabled wings with attics, and there are later added ranges. In the middle is a doorway with pilasters and a segmental pediment containing a coat of arms, and the windows are sashes. In the right range is a semicircular-headed porch and a canted bay window, and in the left range are oriel windows.	II
Bridge Cottage; 54.38867°N 1.65131°W	—	Mid 18th century	A stone house with quoins, and a tile roof with stone copings and shaped kneelers. There are two storeys and four bays, and an attached single-storey outbuilding on the left. On the front are two doorways with interrupted jambs and extended lintels with keystones, the right blocked and a window inserted. The windows are casements with extended lintels and keystones.	II
Bridge over Brough Beck; 54.37641°N 1.67219°W		Late 18th century	The bridge, which carries Tunstall Lane over Brough Beck, is in sandstone, and consists of a single segmental arch. It has stepped and alternately raised voussoirs, a tripartite keystone, and a parapet with coping that is partly triangular and partly segmental.	II
Thornbrough; 54.38717°N 1.65700°W	—	Late 18th century	The farmhouse is in stone, with quoins, and a two-span pantile roof with stone copings and shaped kneelers, one initialled. There are two storeys, a double depth plan and three bays. The central doorway, which has a fanlight, and the windows, which are sashes, have stone surrounds and keystones.	II
Stable block, Brough Hall; 54.37494°N 1.66820°W		1780	The stable block, designed by John Foss, has been converted for residential use. It is in stone with a stone slate roof, and has a courtyard plan. In the south range is a two-storey three -bay coach house, flanked by single-storey stables, that extend along the east and west sides, to join the two-storey five-bay north entrance range. The middle bay of the entrance range projects and is gabled, and contains a semicircular carriage arch with an architrave, imposts continuing as a band, and a keystone, over which is a clock in a pediment. The outer bays contain round-arched casement windows recessed in blind arcading, with oculi above. On the roof is a colonnaded cupola with a lead roof and a weathervane. The south range has chamfered rusticated quoins, round-arched doorways with stepped voussoirs springing from chamfered rusticated piers, oculi in stone surrounds, a cornice and a hipped roof.	II
Ice house, Brough Hall; 54.37549°N 1.67147°W	—	Late 18th century	The ice house is in the grounds to the west of the hall, and it consists of a circular underground vaulted chamber with an access hole in the top. On the top is a room with an irregularly rounded plan with a brick barrel-vaulted entrance passage.	II
Bridge, Brough Hall; 54.37650°N 1.66945°W		c. 1790	The bridge carries the drive of the hall over a stream, and was designed by John Foss. It is in sandstone, and consists of a single segmental arch. The bridge has chamfered rusticated voussoirs, and curving balustraded parapets with blank panels and circular end bollards with rounded tops.	II
Ash House; 54.38228°N 1.66701°W		Late 18th to early 19th century	The farmhouse is in roughcast stone, with stone dressings, chamfered rusticated quoins, and a Westmorland slate roof with stone copings and shaped kneelers. There are three storeys and three bays, and flanking single-storey single-bay wings with hipped roofs. The central doorway has an architrave on a plinth and a fanlight, and the windows on the front are sashes with keystones.	II
Gate piers north of St Paulinus' Church; 54.37835°N 1.66952°W		Early to mid 19th century	The gate piers and the screen walls are in sandstone. The inner piers have a square plan, and each has a plinth with moulding, a shaft with rusticated bands alternately plain and vermiculated, a frieze with large single paterae and guttae, and a cap with three small paterae, surmounted by an urn with swags. The outer piers are lower and have plain caps with rounded tops. The gates are in wrought iron, and the screen walls have a quadrant plan and square terminals with rounded tops.	II
St Paulinus' Church, presbytery and outbuilding 54.37808°N 1.66960°W		1837	The church and associated buildings were designed by Ignatius Bonomi, and have since been converted for residential use. They are in sandstone with Welsh slate roofs. The church has two storeys and five bays, with schoolrooms in the ground floor and the church above, which has a nave and a chancel in one unit, and a north vestry. The presbytery has two storeys, three bays, and a double depth plan. The central doorway has a fanlight, the windows are sashes, and there is a coped parapet. At the rear is a walled yard with stables and other outbuildings.	II*
