= A6108 road =

A-road in North Yorkshire, England

Coordinates: 54.2827°N 1.7889°W

A6108

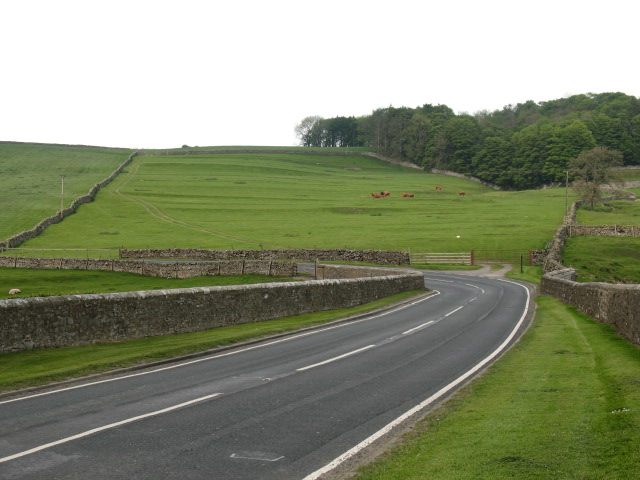
- A6108 at Walburn

Route information
- Length: 35.8 mi (57.6 km)

Major junctions
- North end: Scotch Corner
- A1(M); A66 A6055 A6136 A684; A61
- South end: Ripon

Location
- Country: United Kingdom
- Constituent country: England

Road network
- Roads in the United Kingdom; Motorways; A and B road zones
| ← A6107 | → A6109 |

The A6108 road is an A road in North Yorkshire, England. It runs from the south of Scotch Corner to Ripon going via Richmond and Leyburn across the moors and the valleys of Swaledale and Wensleydale. The road is 37 miles (60 km) long, but through traffic between the two destinations will find a shorter route of 26 miles (42 km) by going south on the A1. The route is single carriageway for its entire length.

The route was closed for traffic on 5 July 2014 between Leyburn and Ripon to accommodate Stage One of the Tour De France.

== Description of route ==
The road starts south of Scotch Corner, heading south then south-west over Skeeby Beck on a 17th and 18th century bridge through Skeeby and into Richmond. In Richmond town there is a junction with the A6136 road to Catterick Garrison and Catterick Bridge. The road takes the northern flank of the town and heads west, out alongside the River Swale crossing the river at Lownethwaite which is 1-mile (1.6 km) out of Richmond. 2 1/2 miles (4.0 km) out of Richmond, the road heads south through Downholme. The road has a sharp 90° turn to the south-west and an almost immediate 90° turn south-east at Walburn Hall on the edge of Wathgill Army Camp. After this there is a short run to the junction with the Catterick road where the A6108 turns onto the unclassified road at a 90° angle south-westwards at a T-Junction.

The road now follows the route of the Richmond to Lancaster Turnpike, which is why it turns onto and off this road via T-junctions. After a mile (1.6 km) there is a sharp 90° turn off the road to the south where the A6108 continues through Bellerby and dropping down into Leyburn where it meets the road from Reeth and then the A684. The A6108 then runs in tandem with the A684 south-east through Leyburn centre for less than half a mile and turns off south going over the River Ure at Middleham Bridge and ascending a slight incline into Middleham where the road curves to the east.

It carries on in an eastwards direction until it crosses the River Cover where it heads due south into East Witton and then east again through the village following a rough south-easterly direction through Jervaulx and Low Ellington for 7 miles (11 km) until it enters Masham. Here the road heads east over the River Ure again before heading south-east into West Tanfield (over the Ure) and down through North Stainley where Lightwater Valley is on the western side of the road.

The road enters Ripon 10 miles (16 km) after leaving Masham and heads east at the junction with North Road on the old A61, across North Bridge (over the River Ure) and then it has a roundabout junction the A61 bypass around Ripon.

== Safety ==
A section of the route from Halfpenny House Junction (where the A6108 meets the unclassified road from Catterick Garrison) is known locally as the Tank Road. The British Army training estate beyond Catterick Garrison to the west is used for Infantry and armoured transport training. The road was widened and flattened out, which means high speeds can be attained in an area where the roads are narrow and slow going. This has led to many accidents, especially on the intersections in the road.

During the period between January 2001 and November 2004, the area around halfpenny House was designated an accident cluster in the local Traffic Management Study published in 2007. A total of 9 accidents occurred here including 5 where drivers lost control on the bends. Drivers have been warned by North Yorkshire Police about safety, especially as the roads are prone to icing over in winter, which adds to the danger.

Traffic calming measures were implemented outside the Secondary School in Richmond in 2008 and new signage was erected on the unclassified road leading to Halfpenny House Junction on the A6108.

== Middleham Bridge ==
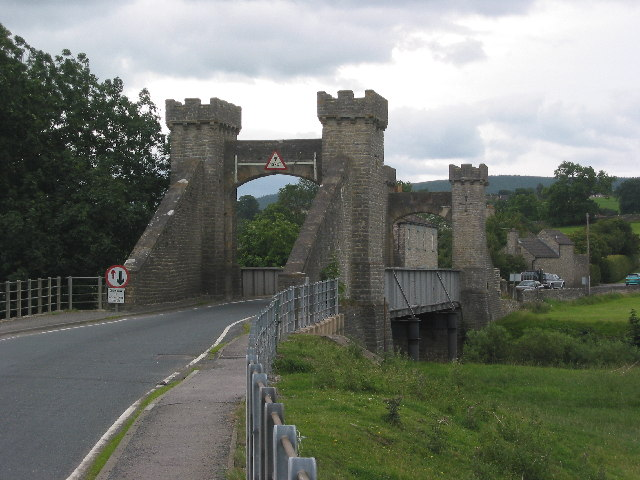
The north to south approach onto Middleham Bridge on the A6108 in North Yorkshire. The height restriction is shown on the bridge and the traffic priority sign can be seen on the left.

The suspension bridge over the River Ure at Middleham is subject to a height restriction of 13-foot (4-metre) with poor advanced signage. The road over the bridge is only able to sustain one way traffic, with the priority given to vehicles exiting Middleham (i.e. going north to Leyburn). The bridge is castellated with stone beams going widthways across the structure. This accounts for the height restriction as the bridge goes over the river and not under a railway or canal.

The mock medieval towers were built in 1829 when crossing the bridge required paying a toll. The bridge itself lies on the position of a ferry crossing.

== Bibliography ==
- Simon, Jos. The Rough Guide to Yorkshire. London, UK: Rough Guides, 2011. ISBN 978-1-84836-603-9.
- Wright, Geoffrey. Roads and trackways of the Yorkshire Dales. Ashbourne, UK: Moorland Publishing, 1985. ISBN 0-86190-410-9.
