= St Martin's, North Yorkshire =

Civil parish in North Yorkshire, England

Coordinates: 54.397°N 1.730°W

St Martin's
- Civil parish
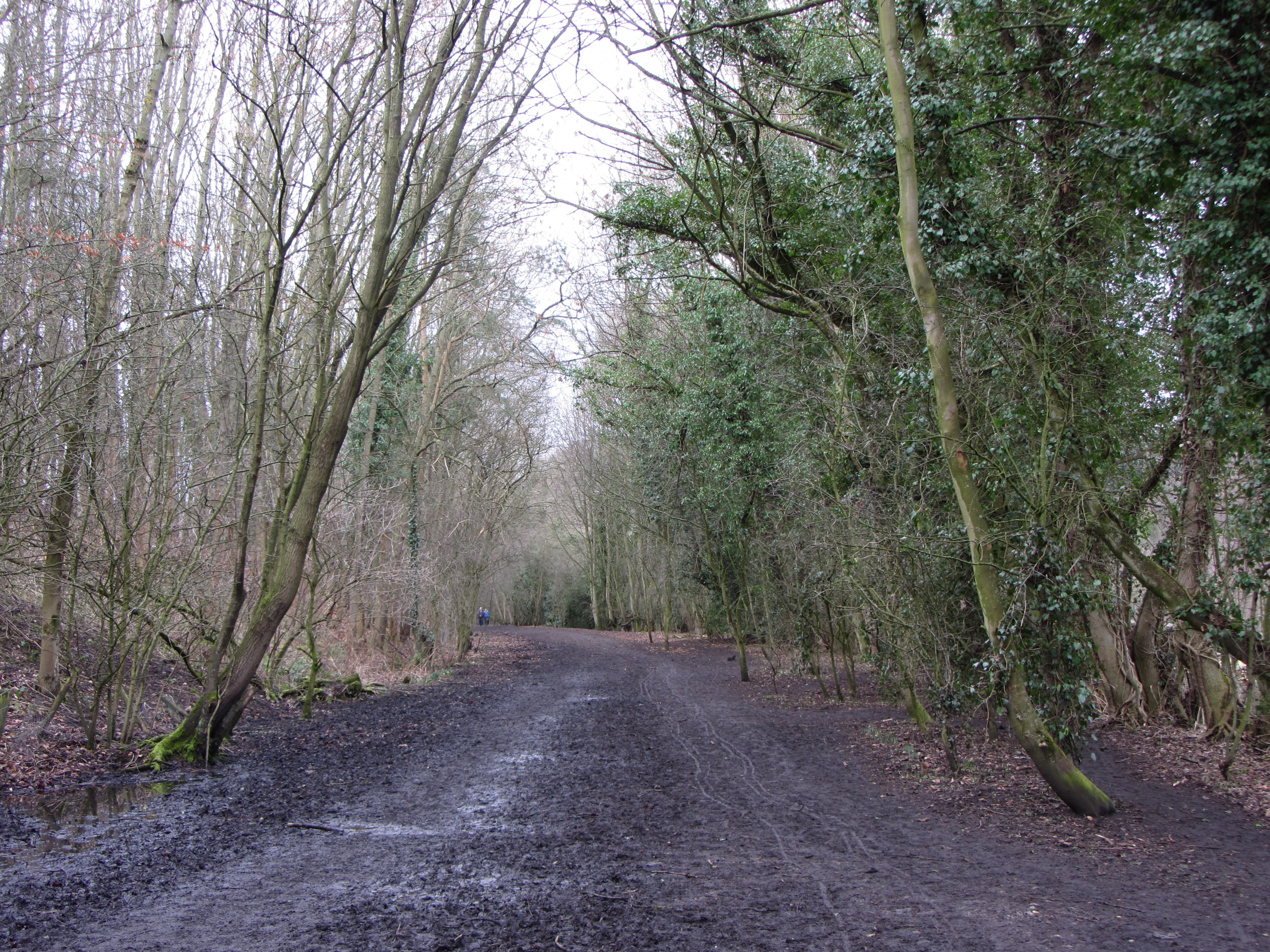
- Former railway line to Richmond through St Martin's Parish

- Location within North Yorkshire
- Population: 222 (2011)
- OS grid reference: NZ178004
- Unitary authority: North Yorkshire
- Ceremonial county: North Yorkshire
- Region: Yorkshire and the Humber
- Country: England
- Sovereign state: United Kingdom
- Police: North Yorkshire
- Fire: North Yorkshire
- Ambulance: Yorkshire

St Martin's is a civil parish in North Yorkshire, England. It is located south of the town of Richmond, covering the residential areas south of the River Swale, including the former Richmond railway station and Holly Hill.

Located within the parish is the ruin of St. Martin's Priory, a former Benedictine house.

== History ==
Richmond railway station is located within the parish, which is separated from Richmond by the River Swale. The position of the station was because it was considered "geographically impossible" to locate the station within the town. Of the ten listed buildings in the parish, seven are associated with the railway terminus, one is the bridge at the west of the parish into Richmond, and two are those associated with St Martin's Priory, the namesake of the parish.

== Governance ==
Historically, St Martin's was in the ecclesiastical parish of Catterick, and was its own extra parochial area, before being made into a civil parish in 1858. It was originally in the wapentake of Gilling West, but was moved into the wapentake Hang East. From 1974 to 2023 it was part of the district of Richmondshire, it is now administered by the unitary North Yorkshire Council. In 2001, the parish had a population of 242, which had dropped to 222 by the time of the 2011 census. In 2015, North Yorkshire County Council estimated the population of the parish to be 200.
