= St Paulinus' Church, Brough =

Roman Catholic church in North Yorkshire, United Kingdom

Coordinates: 54°22′41″N 1°40′11″W

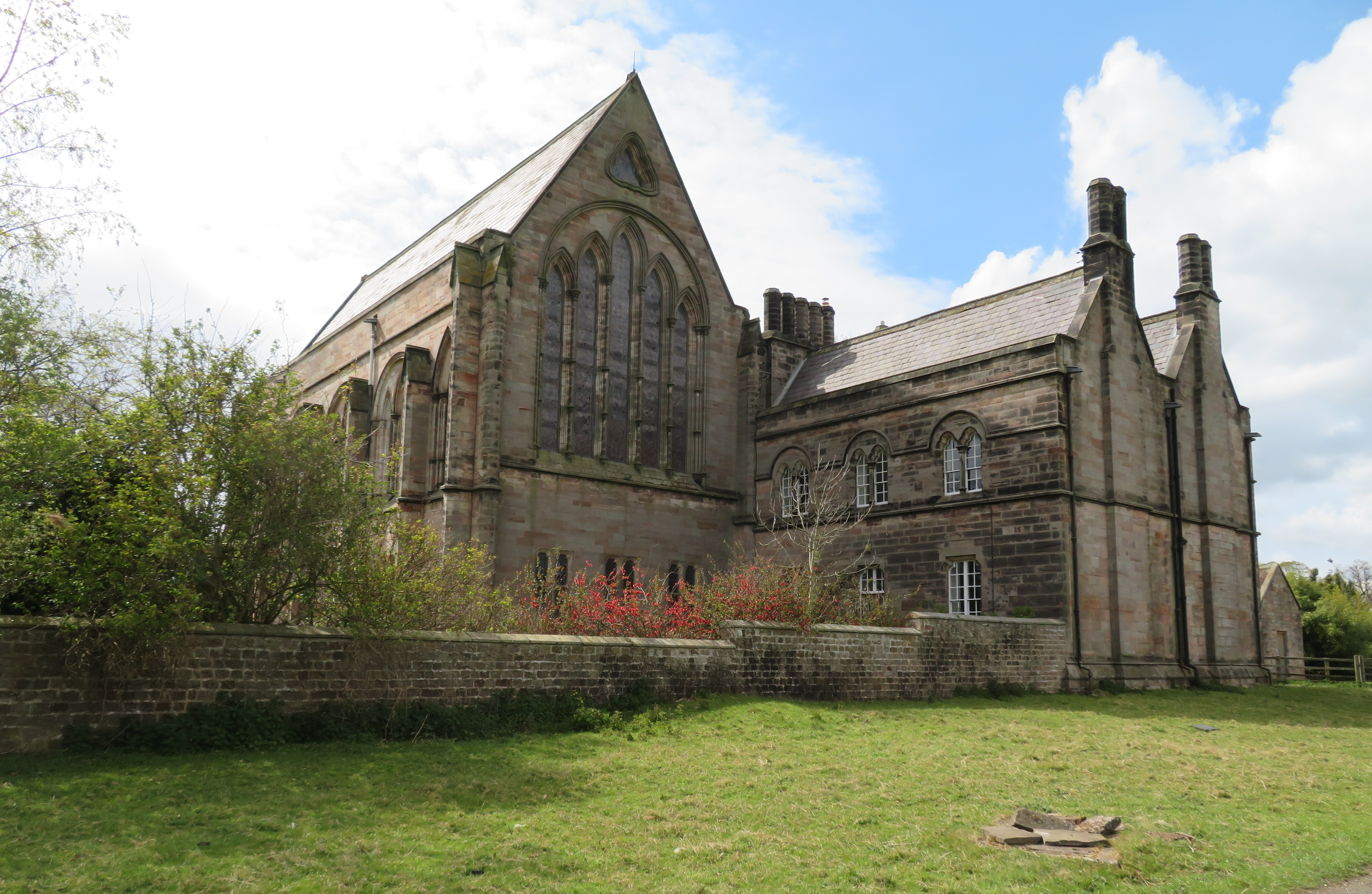
The church, in 2021

St Paulinus' Church is a former Catholic church in Brough with St Giles, a village in North Yorkshire in England.

A Catholic chapel associated with Brough Hall was constructed in 1758. The church was commissioned by William Lawson, and constructed in 1837 to a design by Ignatius Bonomi. It was Grade II* listed in 1987. In 1992, the church and adjoining presbytery and schoolroom were purchased by the art collector Greville Worthington, who converted it into holiday accommodation.

The church and attached buildings built of sandstone and have Welsh slate roofs. The church has two storeys and five bays, with schoolrooms in the ground floor and the church above, which has a nave and a chancel in one unit, and a north vestry. The presbytery has two storeys, three bays, and a double depth plan. The central doorway has a fanlight, the windows are sashes, and there is a coped parapet. At the rear is a walled yard with stables and other outbuildings.

Inside the church, there is a grand altar based on the tomb of Walter de Gray at York Minster, and below it, a sarcophagus transferred from the catacombs of Rome, said to contain the remains of Saint Innocent. The reredos was designed by George Walker Milburn and installed in 1887. The east window has stained glass by Thomas Willement, a copy of the Five Sisters window at York Minster. The south windows have glass by William Wailes from the 1850s, and the north west window glass by H. M. Barnett, installed in 1880. There is also an 11th-century font.

== See also ==
- Grade II* listed churches in North Yorkshire (district)
- Listed buildings in Brough with St Giles
