= Brough Hall =

Historic country house in Brough with St Giles, North Yorkshire, England

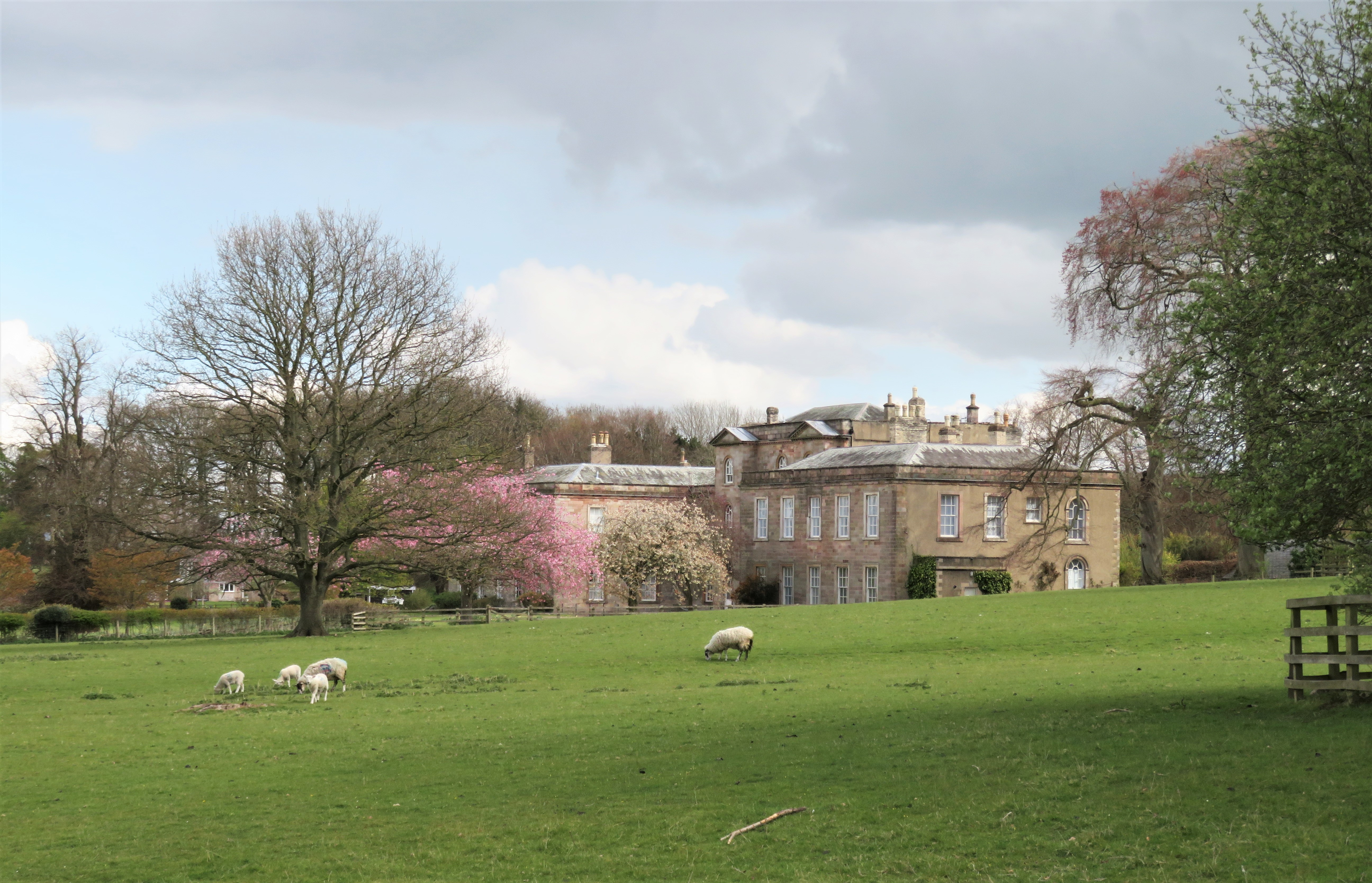
The hall, in 2021

Brough Hall is a historic country house in Brough with St Giles, a village in North Yorkshire, in England.

== History ==
The hall was originally constructed by the De Burgh family in the 15th century as a tower house. It passed to the Lawson family in 1575, and they soon added wings to the house. It was further altered and extended in the early 17th century, in about 1730, and about 1770; the appearance of the front and sides of the building is now of an 18th-century structure. The building was again altered in the mid-19th century. It was grade I listed in 1951, and in 1979 it was sold by the Lawsons and was divided into apartments.

The building is constructed of sandstone, partly roughcast, with Westmorland slate roofs. In the centre is the tower house with three storeys and three bays, the 16th-century outer bays slightly projecting and gabled, flanked by 18th-century two-storey bays, and with a rear stair tower. On each side of these are two-storey five-bay blocks; the rear of the east block with a chapel wing. In the centre of the main block is a Doric portico and a doorway in an architrave, above which is a Venetian window with voussoirs in a round-arched recess. The other windows in the block are round-arched sashes in architraves, and above them is a modillion cornice and gable pediments, and a parapet with moulded coping. At the rear are quoins, blocked mullioned and transomed windows, and a doorway with a quoined chamfered surround and a triangular head. In the stair tower is a Tuscan Venetian window with a pediment on a balustraded dado, and a Diocletian window.

Inside, the ground floor of the central block is a hall with 16th-century oak panelling and plasterwork, including an ornate ceiling with small pendants. On the first floor, two small rooms have been combined but retain 16th-century decorative plaster ceilings, while the great chamber (now sub-divided) has fine 18th-century features including a timber cornice (including dentil and egg & dart designs); six-panelled doors with egg & dart mouldings; door architraves with crossetted corners and fine decorative carved timberwork around the two front windows including reeded columns. There is also a priest-hole on this level. The second floor has fragments of plaster wall friezes and small areas of oak panelling, both similar to those found in the hall. The staircase tower has a grand oak staircase with carved balusters in a local 'York' style, dating from about 1730. The staircase also has a fine decorative plaster ceiling/cornice, Greek Key dado rail and fine carved wood surrounds to the rear Venetian Window and pediment over the door to the great chamber. The east block has a late-18th-century cantilevered stone staircase, and two stone fireplaces of similar date. The chapel wing has extensive 18th-century woodwork. In the west wing, on the ground floor, are an 18th-century fireplace, plasterwork, and cantilevered stone staircase.

In 1975 the Department of the Environment had given permission for much of the Hall to be demolished, leaving the west wing and only the end bay of the central block standing. The Developer, Yuill (York) Limited, saved the Hall from partial destruction by converting it into ten self-contained houses and apartments in the 1980s.

St Paulinus' Church, a Catholic chapel, lies in the grounds of the hall.

== See also ==
- Grade I listed buildings in North Yorkshire (district)
- Listed buildings in Brough with St Giles
