= Brough with St Giles =

Village and civil parish in North Yorkshire, England

Coordinates: 54.3817°N 1.6689°W

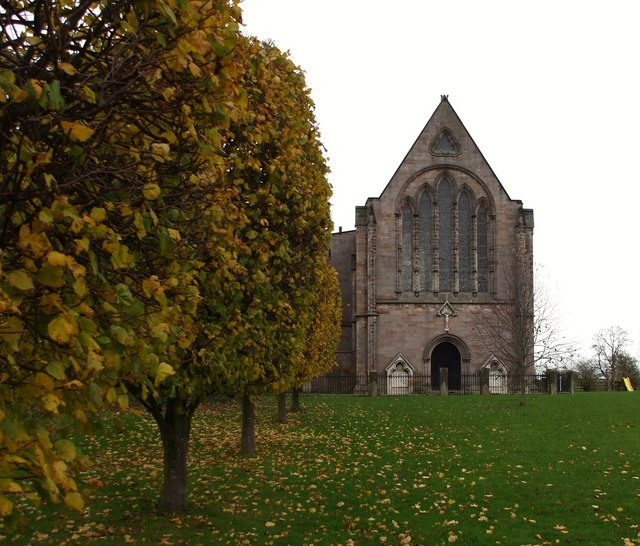
- Church of St Paulinus Presbytery, Brough Park

- Location within North Yorkshire
- Population: 801 (2011 census)
- OS grid reference: SE2198
- Unitary authority: North Yorkshire
- Ceremonial county: North Yorkshire
- Region: Yorkshire and the Humber
- Country: England
- Sovereign state: United Kingdom
- Post town: Richmond
- Postcode district: DL10
- Dialling code: 01748
- Police: North Yorkshire
- Fire: North Yorkshire
- Ambulance: Yorkshire
- UK Parliament: Richmond and Northallerton

Brough with St Giles is a village and a civil parish in North Yorkshire, England. The civil parish also includes the settlements of Catterick Bridge and Walkerville, and Catterick Racecourse and the site of the Roman town of Cataractonium. According to the 2001 Census the parish had a population of 338, increasing to 801 at the 2011 census.

Brough was known as Burgh until the 17th century. It was historically a township in the ancient parish of Catterick in the North Riding of Yorkshire. It became a separate civil parish in 1866. In 1974 it was transferred to the new county of North Yorkshire and was part of the Richmondshire district until 2023, it is now administered by the unitary North Yorkshire Council.

St Giles is now a single farm in the north of the parish. Near the modern farm is the site of the medieval hospital of St Giles, a Scheduled Ancient Monument excavated in 1988–1990.

Brough Hall is a Grade I listed country house which has now been converted to apartments. It was originally built in the 15th century but has been altered and extended several times since then. Originally owned by the de Burgh family, from c. 1575 it belonged to the Lawsons.

The former Roman Catholic church of St Paulinus in the grounds of Brough Hall was designed in 1837 by Ignatius Bonomi for the recusant William Lawson and is a Grade II* listed building.

== See also ==
- Listed buildings in Brough with St Giles
