= Catterick Racecourse =

Racecourse in Catterick, North Yorkshire, England

Coordinates: 54°23′13″N 1°39′00″W

Catterick
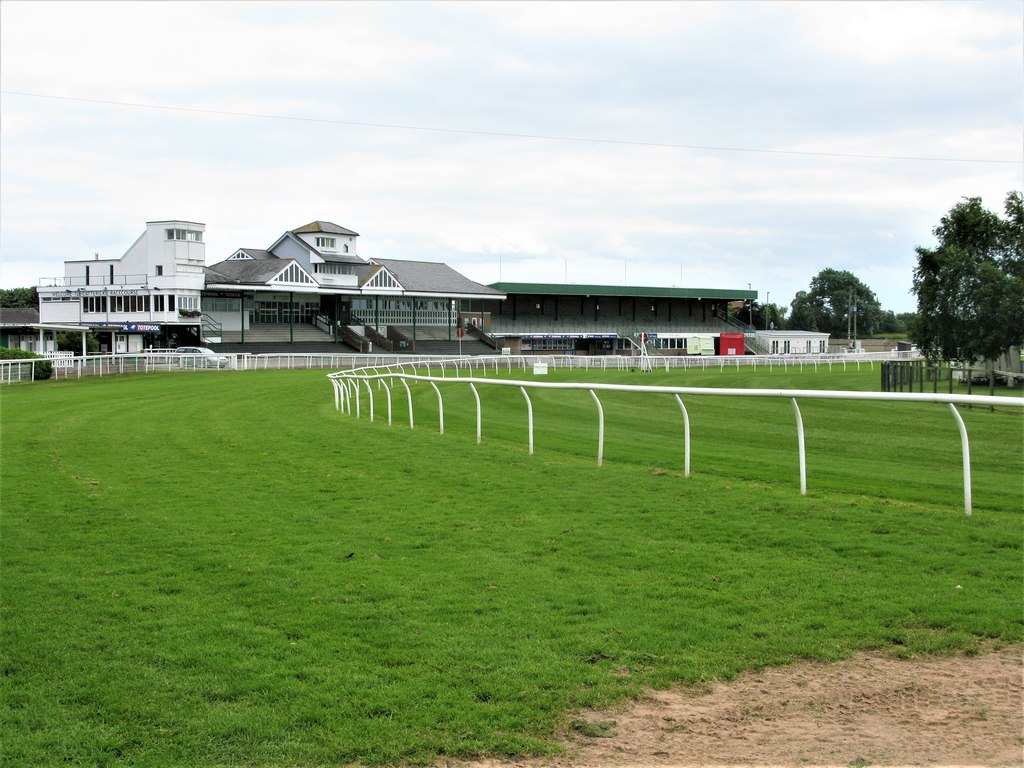
- The stands in 2018
- Interactive map of Catterick
- Location: Catterick Bridge; North Yorkshire (United Kingdom)
- Date opened: 1783
- Screened on: Racing TV
- Course type: Flat; National Hunt
- Notable races: North Yorkshire Grand National; Catterick Dash

Catterick Racecourse, sometimes known as Catterick Bridge Racecourse, is a thoroughbred horse racing venue one mile northwest of Catterick in North Yorkshire, England, near the hamlet of Catterick Bridge. The first official racing at Catterick was held in 1783 but it's located in an area with history in racing predating this. The current grandstand would be built in 1906.

Catterick stages flat and National Hunt racing, with both tracks left-handed, sharp, and undulating.

The feature events at the course are the North Yorkshire Grand National in the jumps season, held in January, and the Catterick Dash in the flat season, held in October.

== History ==
Yorkshire has been a centre of horse racing for many centuries and today it remains home to nine racecourses, including Catterick. Richmond Racecourse was only a few miles away and its first meeting was recorded in 1669, with the racecourse (one mile and four furlongs in circumference) lasting until 1891. Catterick hosted events in the mid-17th century in an unofficial capacity and the first sanctioned meeting took place at Easter 1783. A permanent track was laid down in 1813. It was that year when a journalist reported that 'when the course is finished, Catterick will be the best meeting north of the Trent'.

The course was always run with a very tight budget at that time, necessitating improvisation. Thomas Ferguson (landlord of the adjacent Bridge Hotel and a St Leger-winning owner) drove a flock of sheep round the course in 1819 until it was clear of snow that seemed certain to cause abandonment of a meeting. One expense that was paid, however, was for feathers and tar, used on welshers (people who swindled others by not being able to, or not intending to, pay out on bets) before they were thrown into the neighbouring River Swale. During the earlier days, prizes of claret or port were often competed for and a stag would sometimes be released onto the course to showcase the prowess of the local hunt.

Jockey Club-imposed prize money requirements added to the course's financial strains in the Victorian era. An entrance fee was first charged to the general public in 1888, having previously only been required for use of the stand. In 1906, the current grandstand was built, and although it has been modernised since, it remains a key feature of the racecourse.

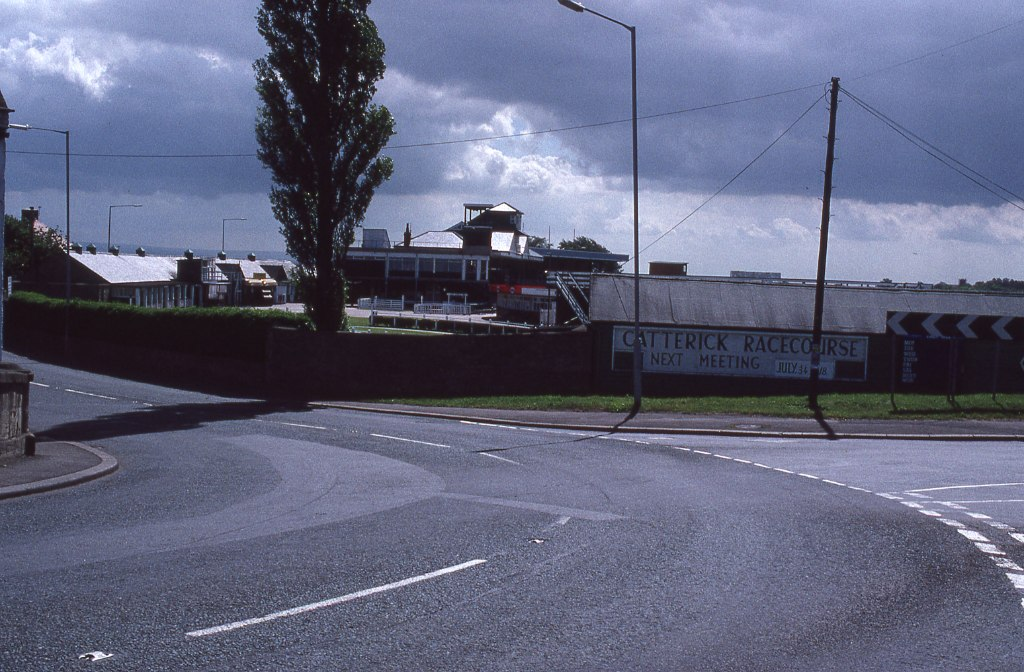
The course in 1991

The Catterick Racecourse Company was formed to operate the racecourse in 1923 and it continues to do so today. Major Leslie Petch had great success in turning the racecourse's fortunes around after World War II; as clerk from 1946 then managing director from 1950, he dealt with serious financial issues and physical handicaps (including regarding the course's layout). £50,000 would be spent on improved facilities in 1967. Improvements continue to be made at Catterick, and while the events it hosts lack the prestige of other local venues, it still prides itself on its friendly and welcoming nature.

There has been discussion in recent years as to Catterick replacing its turf flat surface with an all-weather one. It has planning permission to do so in perpetuity and installed a floodlight base in 2015, but as of 2026, no further progress has been made.

In the 2010s, Catterick embarked on a £3,500,000 redevelopment project, which was split into three phases; the first phase (a new entrance, offices, horse box park and saddling boxes) was completed in 2018, the second phase (an enlarged parade ring, incorporating a new winners’ enclosure, and a refurbished and extended weighing room) in 2019 and the final phase (the Dales Stand) in 2021. Rishi Sunak, who was the Chancellor of the Exchequer at the time, would open the new stand. Developments have continued since, with the Longshots sports bar opening in October 2023; at the same meeting, a permanent big screen (nicknamed Goliath) was first used, with both improvements costing £400,000. The Horseshoe Café Bar was opened (by Sunak, who had served as Prime Minister since his last visit) in 2025, with an existing bar adjacent to the parade ring area having been extended and refurbished at a cost of £1,100,000.

Catterick has made many contributions to racing history despite nowadays lacking any particularly notable races. Collier Hill would go on to win the Hong Kong Vase, Irish St. Leger and Canadian International Stakes after breaking his maiden there, and the legendary Red Rum also won at the racecourse in 1971 under Tommy Stack at 9/2 odds. In terms of jockeys, Willie Carson rode his first winner on a horse named Pinker's Pond in 1962, whilst future Cheltenham Gold Cup winner Ridley Lamb would ride his on White Speck in 1971.

== Course characteristics ==
The five-furlong chute, which runs parallel to a chute for some jump races

Both courses are left-handed tracks but are fairly distinct, with the jumps circuit being two furlongs longer than the flat one and less undulating. The National Hunt course is on the inside of the flat course on the home straight but the outside for the back straight; the hurdle and chase courses also cross over, with fences to the outside of hurdles on the back straight and switching to the inside on the home straight.

The flat course is roughly one mile and one furlong round, very sharp and undulating. There is a downhill run from six furlongs to three furlongs from the finish, whilst the five-furlong course (starting on a chute) is also downhill until reaching a dogleg where it joins the round course. The run-in is three furlongs in length. The turn into the home straight is particularly sharp and slipping on it after heavy rainfall has been known to cause abandonments, for example in August 2022 after only two races had taken place on that year's Ladies' Day fixture. Quick starters and front runners are at a major advantage due to the track's nature, therefore long-striding horses are not favoured at Catterick.

The jumps course is less undulating and longer at one mile and three furlongs and its fences are not fearsome. However, there are five in quick succession on the back straight (along with three on the home straight) and front-running remains beneficial like on the flat course. There is an open ditch on each straight, and also a chute used for two-mile races, which includes a fence. Five hurdles are jumped per circuit in hurdle races.

The gravel subsoil means the going is usually good, however it can change dramatically in 24 hours and abandonments for frozen conditions are fairly common in winter due to the northern location.

Catterick lacks particularly significant races but it does have the five-furlong Catterick Dash (a Class 2 event) as its feature flat race and the 3m 6f North Yorkshire Grand National has been the feature jumps event since its inception in 2003.

== Gallery ==
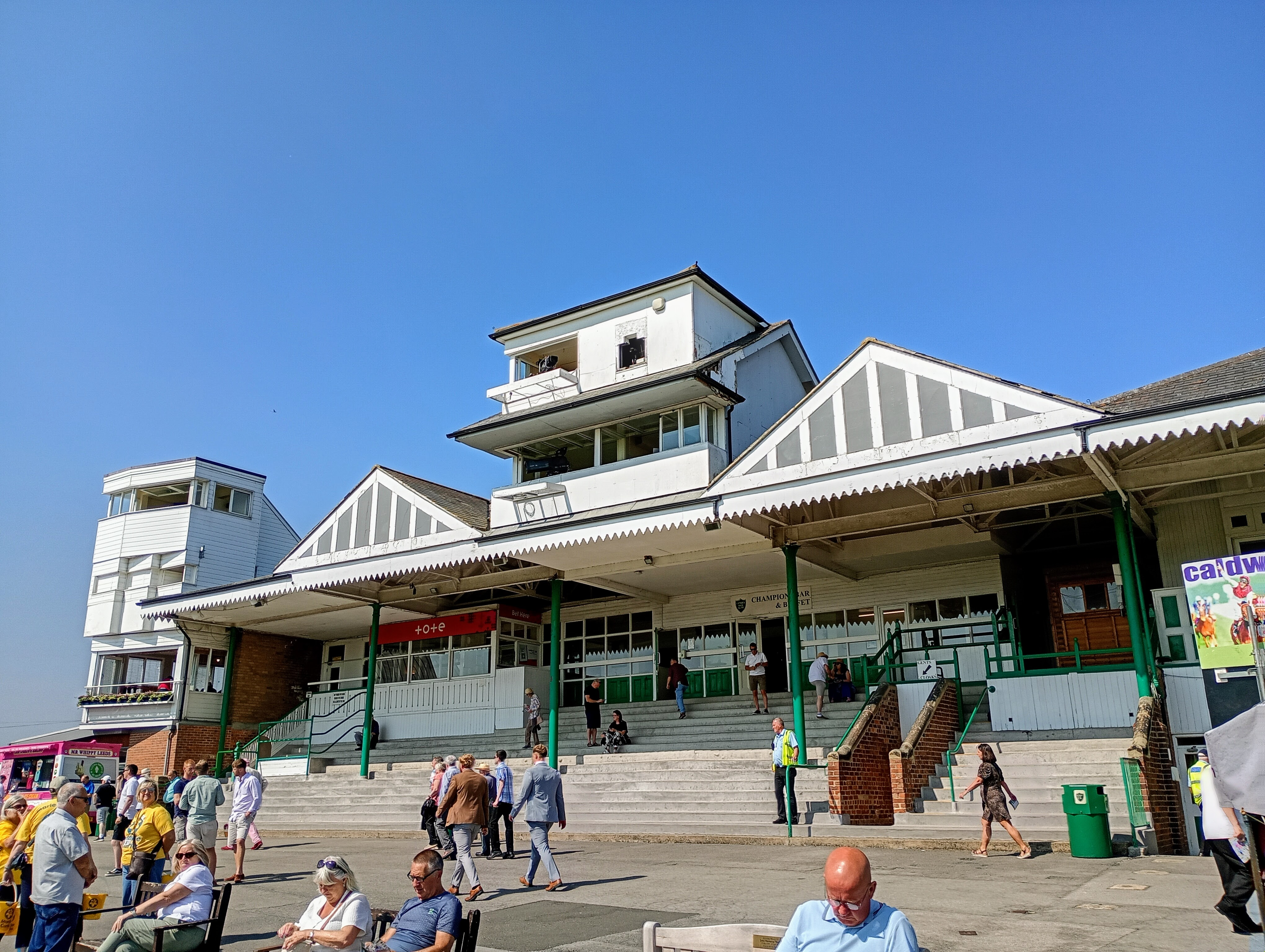
The grandstand, built in 1906

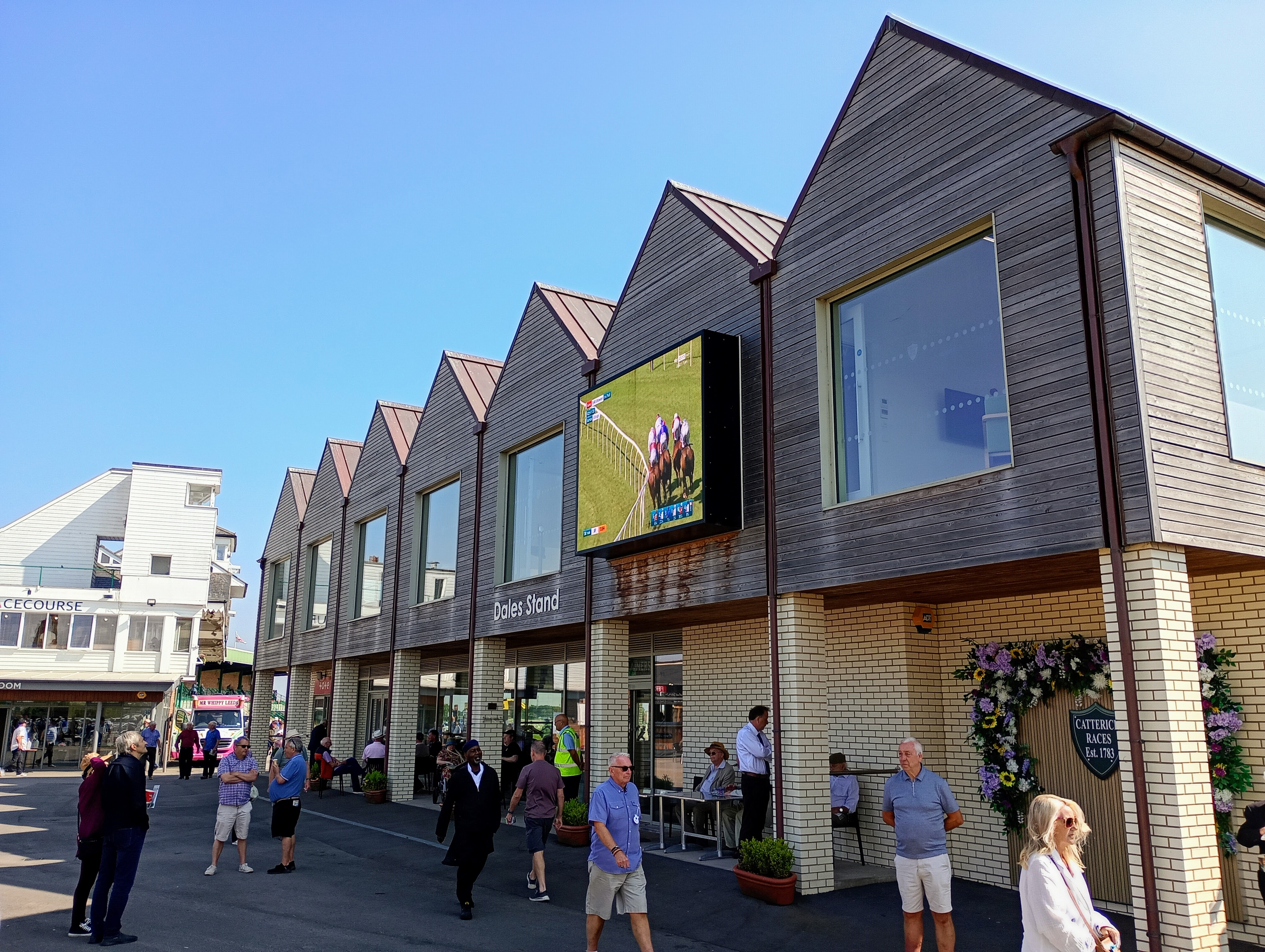
The Dales Stand, opened in 2021

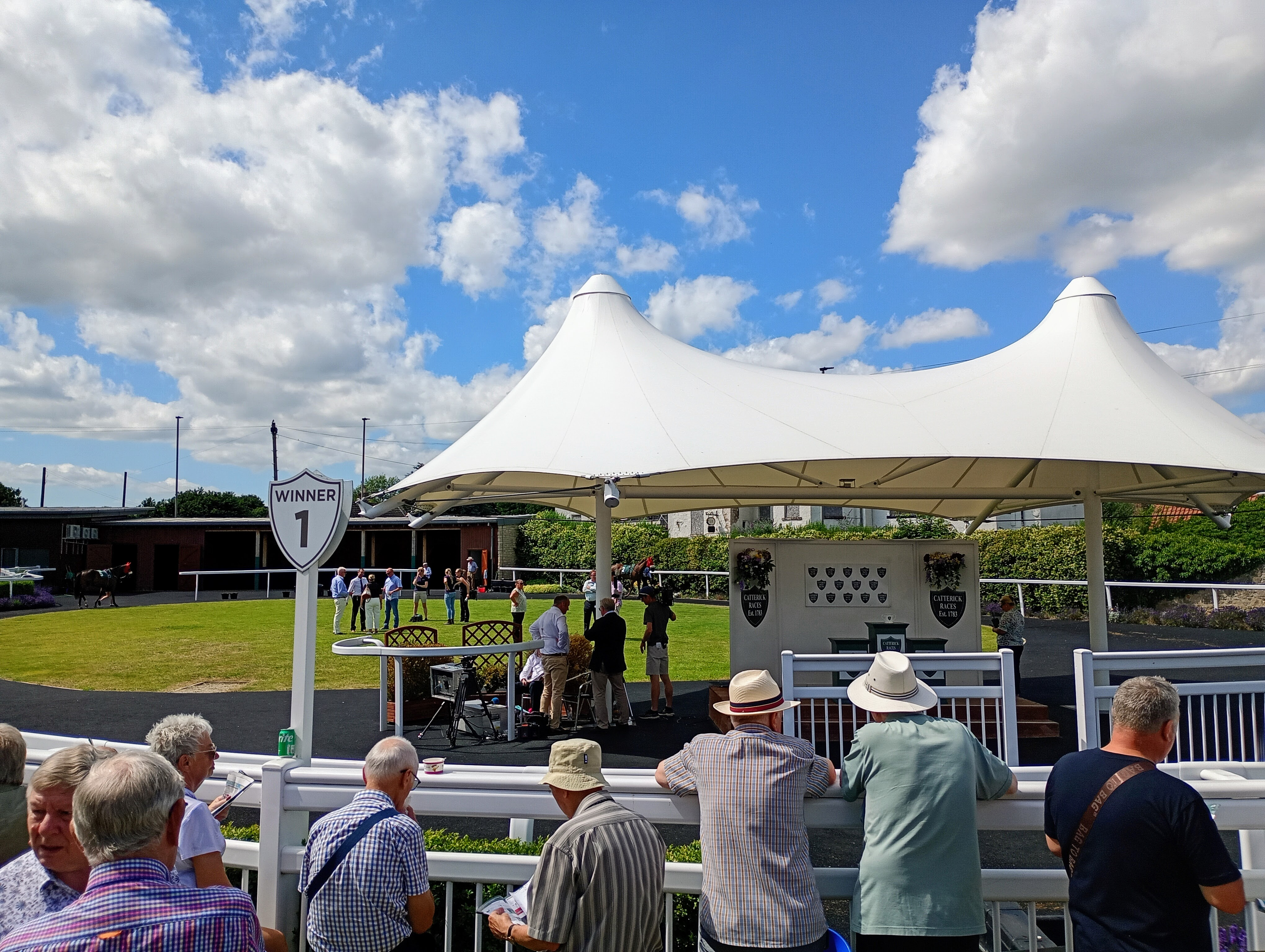
The parade ring

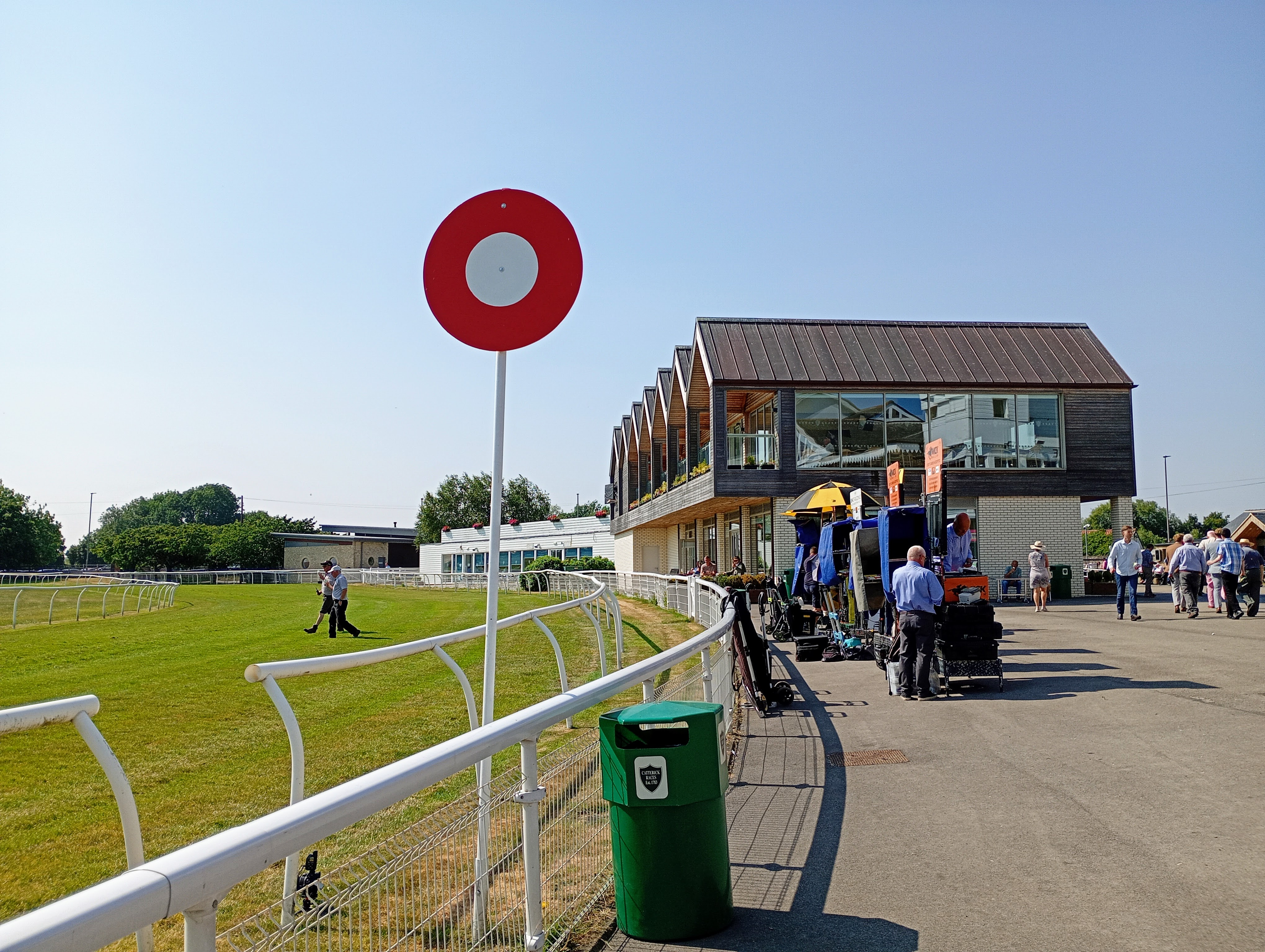
The winning post and Dales Stand

The stable block, strangely across a road from the racecourse

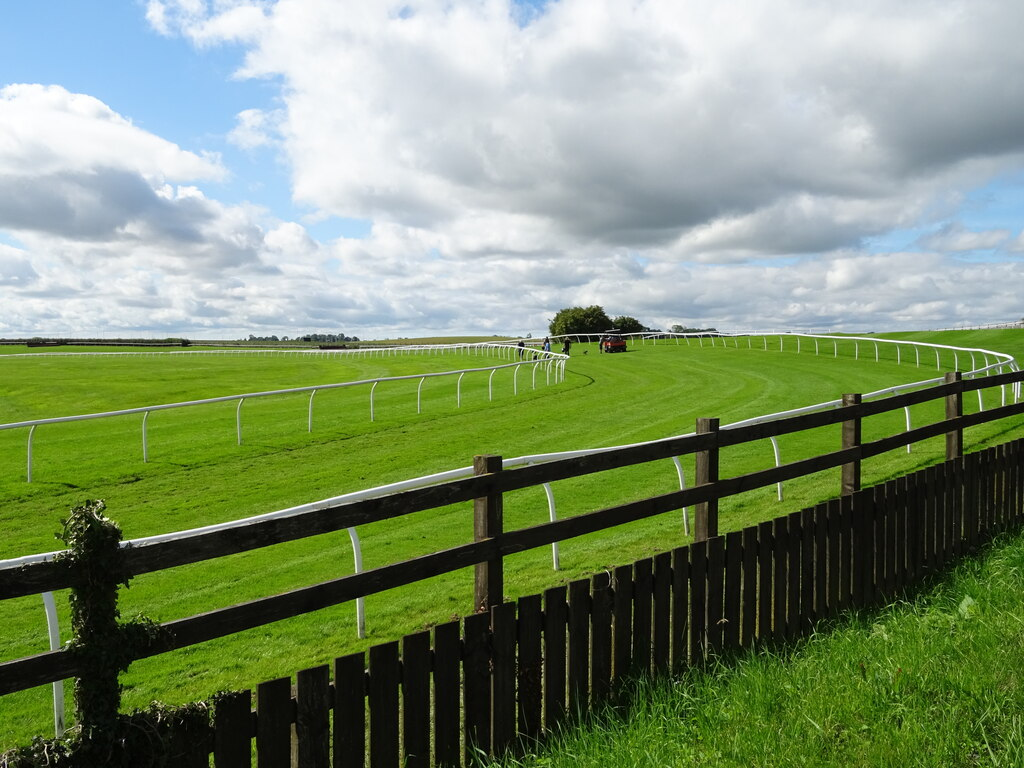
The turn into the back straight

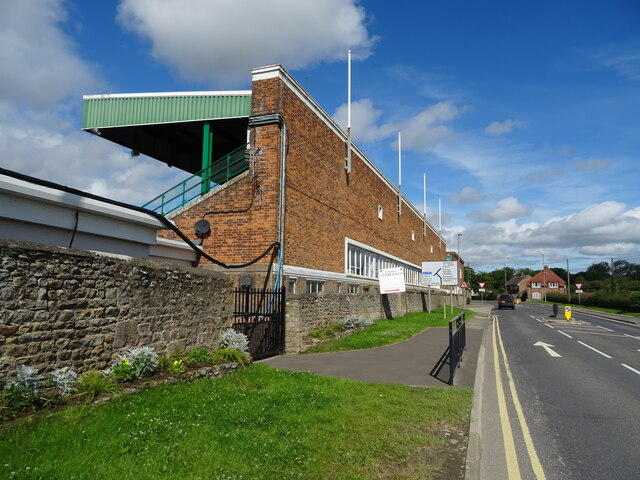
Another stand at the course, which now features the Longshots bar

== Bibliography ==
- Gill, James (1975). Racecourses of Great Britain. London: Barrie & Jenkins. ISBN 0-2142-0090-6.
- Mortimer, Roger (1971). The Encyclopaedia of Flat Racing. London: Robert Hale. ISBN 0-7091-1531-8.
- Mortimer, Roger; Onslow, Richard; Willett, Peter (1978). Biographical Encyclopaedia of British Flat Racing. London: Macdonald and Jane's. ISBN 0-354-08536-0.
