= Richmond railway station (North Yorkshire) =

Disused railway station in North Yorkshire, England

Richmond
- Restored former railway station in 2026

General information
- Location: Richmond, North Yorkshire; England
- Coordinates: 54.403°N 1.729°W
- Grid reference: NZ176008
- Platforms: 2

Other information
- Status: Disused

History
- Original company: York and Newcastle Railway
- Pre-grouping: North Eastern Railway
- Post-grouping: London and North Eastern Railway

Key dates
- 1846: opened
- 1969: closed
Location

Richmond railway station was a railway station that served the town of Richmond in North Yorkshire, England. The station was the terminus of a branch line that connected with what would become the East Coast Main Line.

== History ==
Richmond station was the terminus of the now closed Eryholme-Richmond branch line. In 1845, the Great North of England Railway (GNER) was granted powers by the Great North of England and Richmond Railway Act 1845 (8 & 9 Vict. c. cii) to construct a branch line from Coopers House near Dalton, six miles south of Darlington, to Richmond. While construction of the line was underway the GNER was reconstituted as the York and Newcastle Railway, and it was this company which opened the line on 1846. Although the line opened on 10 September 1846, the present station at Richmond was not opened until 9 April 1847, a temporary wooden platform being provided in the interim.

The line from Dalton Junction (renamed Eryholme Junction in 1911) had stations at Moulton, Scorton and Catterick Bridge, and was double track throughout. These stations are rare in that they were designed in a Tudor style by architect G. T. Andrews. The exuberant architectural style of the early railway stations reflects the desire of the railway companies to promote their new form of travel as a high status experience.

The line crossed the River Swale at Easby, and terminated in the Parish of St Martin's on the south bank of the Swale opposite the town of Richmond, as it was considered "geographically impossible" to build the railway into the town. The station layout consisted of two platforms for passenger trains, one which ended in a horse-loading dock, and the other was underneath the main trainshed. Generous facilities were provided for goods traffic, together with facilities for railway operations and staff accommodation. The principal features were:

- Large goods shed
- Engine shed
- Gasworks
- Signal box (demolished 1968)
- Station Master's house
- Goods Agent's house
- Six staff cottages
- Two goods staff cottages
- Water pumping station at Sand Beck.
- 45 feet (14 m) turntable
- Fifty coal ‘drops’, which were only accessible to trains travelling through the two-road engine shed

The station was listed in the Railway Clearing House Handbook for 1904 as being able to handle horse boxes, cattle, vans and general goods, and was equipped with a 3-tonne (3.3-ton) crane.

The railway also constructed a road bridge over the River Swale and built a road up into the town to provide access to the station. This bridge with four Gothic arches of 52-foot (16 m) span and a 10-foot (3 m) rise, was designed by Robert Stephenson, Engineer-in-Chief of the York & Newcastle Railway and son of George Stephenson (Although some sources credit G. T. Andrews). This bridge was almost unique in that it was a railway-owned bridge carrying a road over a river. It was taken over by the Town Council about 1920 but still retains its North Eastern Railway bridge plates – No 8. This bridge is now known as Mercury Bridge in honour of the close association between the town and the Royal Corps of Signals.

The main station building, the work of the architect George Townsend Andrews of York, was specifically designed for Richmond to blend in with the buildings and character of this historic market town. The 60-foot (18 m) wide two-ridge train shed covered a platform line and two sidings. The original platform was both low and short, extending only a short distance outside the train shed. This was subsequently lengthened in 1860 and the front edge raised resulting in a downward slope towards the floor level of the offices, which survived until the recent renovations. The platform was further lengthened in 1915 to cope with the increased military traffic from the newly established Catterick Camp, and in its final form was 268 yards (245 m) long.

The train shed was open at the south end and lit by gas: electricity was not provided until after the Second World War. The station building included:

- Booking office
- General waiting room (later the enlarged parcels office)
- Ladies waiting room
- Refreshment room (later the waiting room)
- Parcels office (later enlarged)
- Stationmaster's office
- Porter's room
- Toilets.

Later, a wooden ticket-collector's booth was provided next to the main entrance and in the 20th century there was a small wooden bookstall operated by W H Smith, which closed in 1940.

The York & Newcastle Railway survived for a further seven years after the opening of the line, becoming part of the North Eastern Railway in 1854. The NER era lasted for nearly seventy years until 1923 when it became part of the London & North Eastern Railway under the Grouping of railways following the First World War. The LNER itself lasted twenty-five years until the railways were nationalized in 1948 when Richmond became part of the North Eastern Region of British Railways.

Few substantial alterations were made to the station building over the years. As mentioned, the platform was lengthened in 1860, again in 1892, and for a second time in about 1915. The rearrangements of the offices and waiting rooms was carried out during the First World War, and at about the same time the large window at the buffer stop end of the platform was opened up to create a large door for handling parcels traffic.

The station bookstall was removed in 1940 and during the Second World War the Stationmaster's Office was requisitioned by the army as the Railway Transport Officer (RTO) Office. The RTO also had a temporary wooden office under the Port Cochere. Electric lighting was finally installed in the late 1940s, but apart from that little was spent on the building in British Railways days. In the 1950s the rotten wooden screen above the platform lone was patched with zinc sheeting, and by the time of closure there were gaps in the wooden screen, smoke louvres and roof lights.

BR proposed closure of the line in 1963 but this was vigorously opposed by the local community and the proposal was withdrawn. However, the line was gradually run down over the next few years. Goods traffic was withdrawn in 1967 and this enabled the railway to lift all the sidings, including the two in the train shed, and remove all the signals. The station was finally closed on 3 March 1969. The remaining track was lifted in 1970 and the building lay derelict until the whole site was acquired by the District Council.

Before the line was closed the station was included in the List of Buildings of Special Architectural or Historic Interest: it is a Grade II* listed building.

== After closure ==
The station in 2026

The station complex consists of Station Bridge, renamed Mercury Bridge in 1975, the passenger terminus, the goods shed, engine shed, gas house, depot manager's house, Station Cottages and the station master's house. The houses were sold off and still survive.

The goods shed was demolished, and later the site was re-used for the swimming baths, but the rest of the railway infrastructure survives including the bridge which continues to form part of the main road between Richmond and Catterick Garrison, the A6136.

Eventually the passenger terminus became a Farm and Garden Centre, which closed in 2001.

In 2003 a community-based project to regenerate Richmond Station was given the go-ahead. The aims of the project, which was spearheaded by the Richmondshire Building Preservation Trust, were:

- To provide activities and recreational spaces that will meet established local demands at affordable prices.
- To include a limited number of commercial operations sufficient to generate an income to maintain the project and subsidise community activities on site.
- To include at least one use that will attract substantial numbers of visitors to provide the building tenants, and (as a consequence) the building management, with income.

The building re-opened – named simply The Station – in November 2007, with two cinema screens, a restaurant and café-bar, an art gallery, a heritage centre, a number of rooms for public use, and a range of artisan food-producers.

== See also ==
- List of closed railway lines in Great Britain
- List of closed railway stations in Britain
- Grade II* listed buildings in North Yorkshire (district)
- Listed buildings in St Martin's, North Yorkshire

== Sources ==
- Blakemore, Michael (2005). Railways of the Yorkshire Dales. Ilkley: Great Northern Books. ISBN 1-905080-03-4.
- Fawcett, Bill (2011). George Townsend Andrews of York : 'The railway architect'. North Eastern Railway Association. ISBN 978-1-873513-76-7.
- Ludlam, A. J. (1993). The Catterick Camp Military Railway and the Richmond Branch. The Oakwood Press. ISBN 0-85361-438-5.
- Suggitt, Gordon (2005). Lost railways of North and East Yorkshire. Newbury: Countryside Books. ISBN 978-185306-918-5.
- Young, Alan (2015). The lost stations of Yorkshire; the North and East Ridings. Kettering: Silver Link. ISBN 978-1-85794-453-2.

== Gallery ==
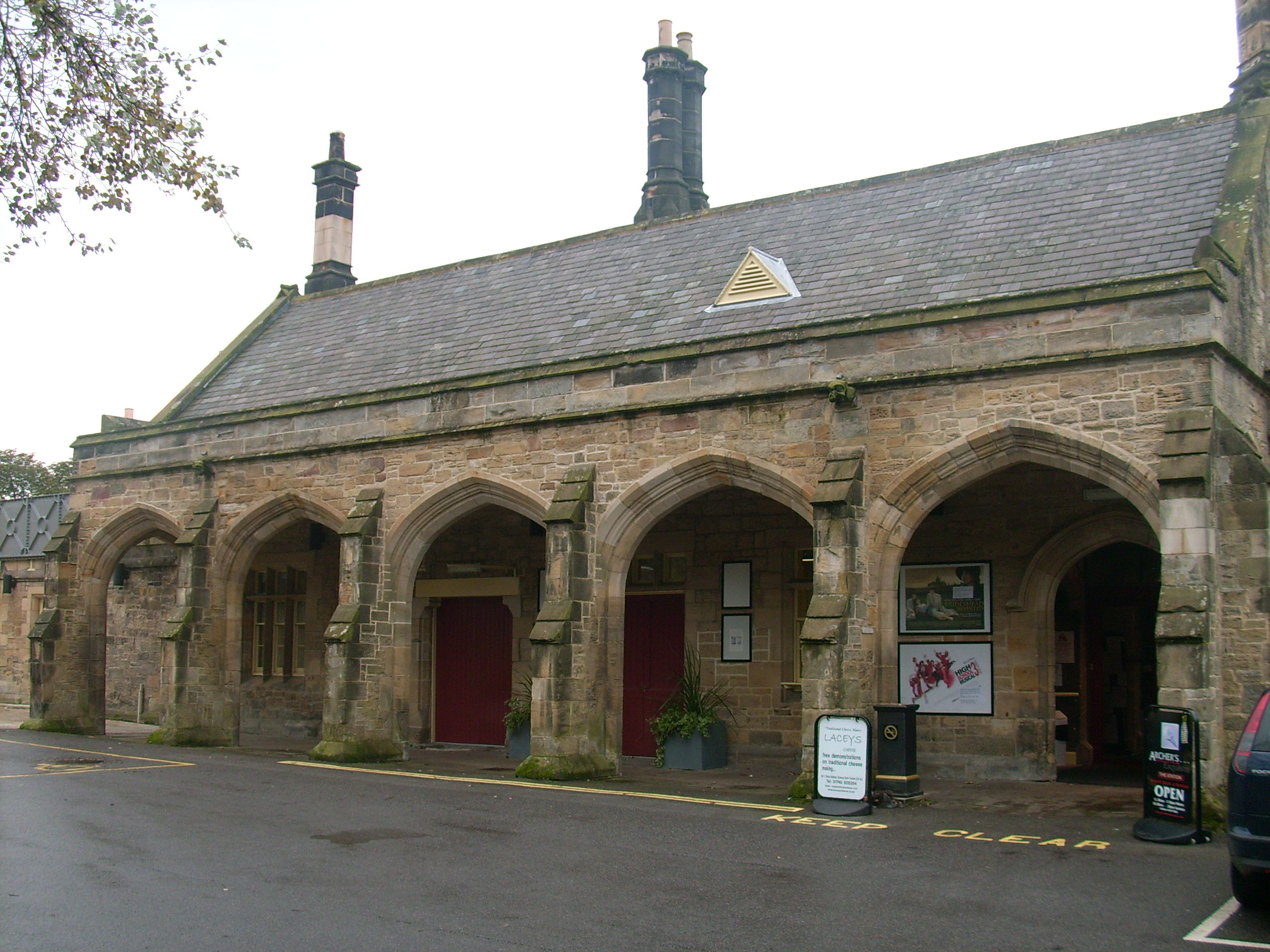

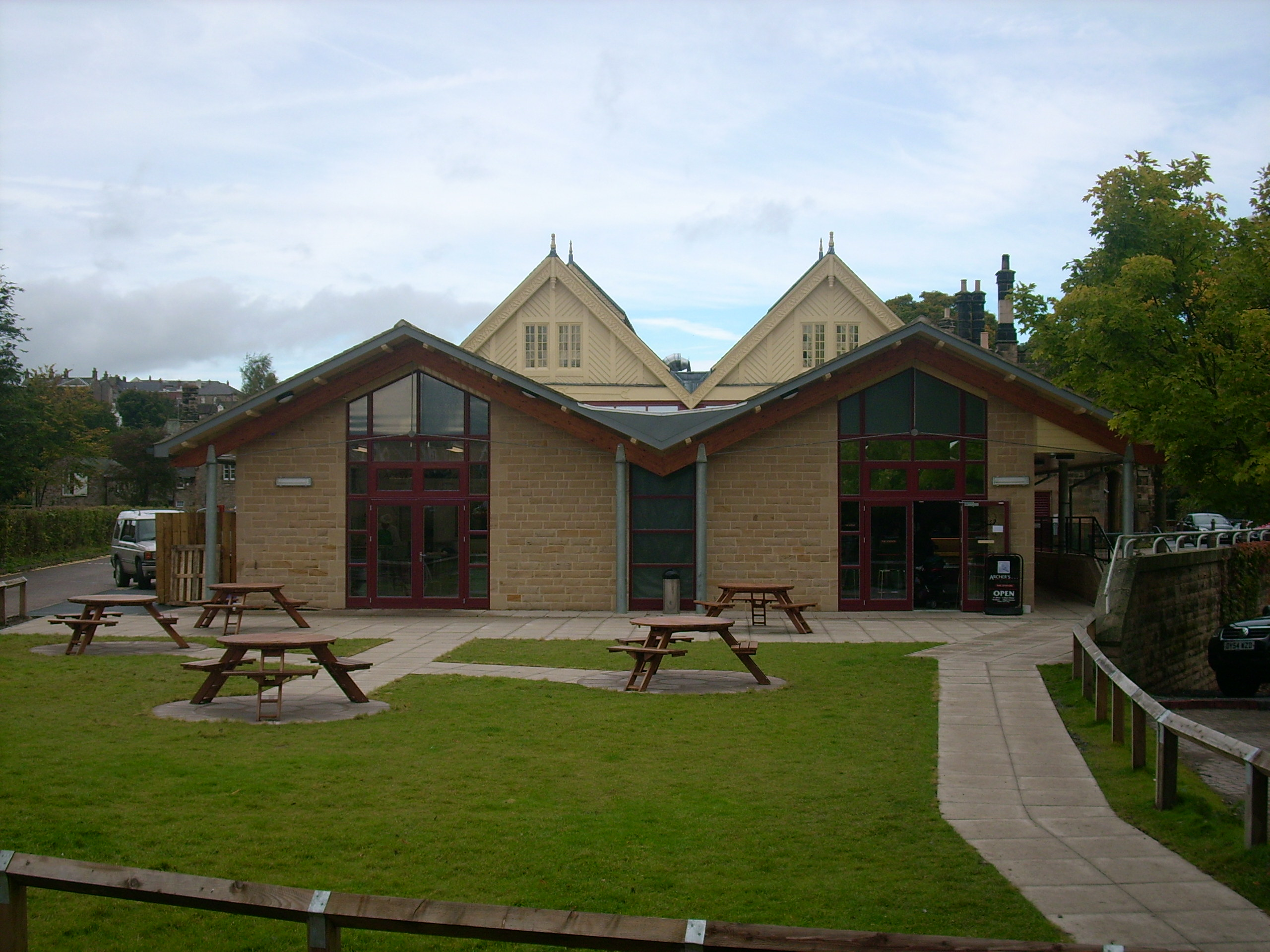

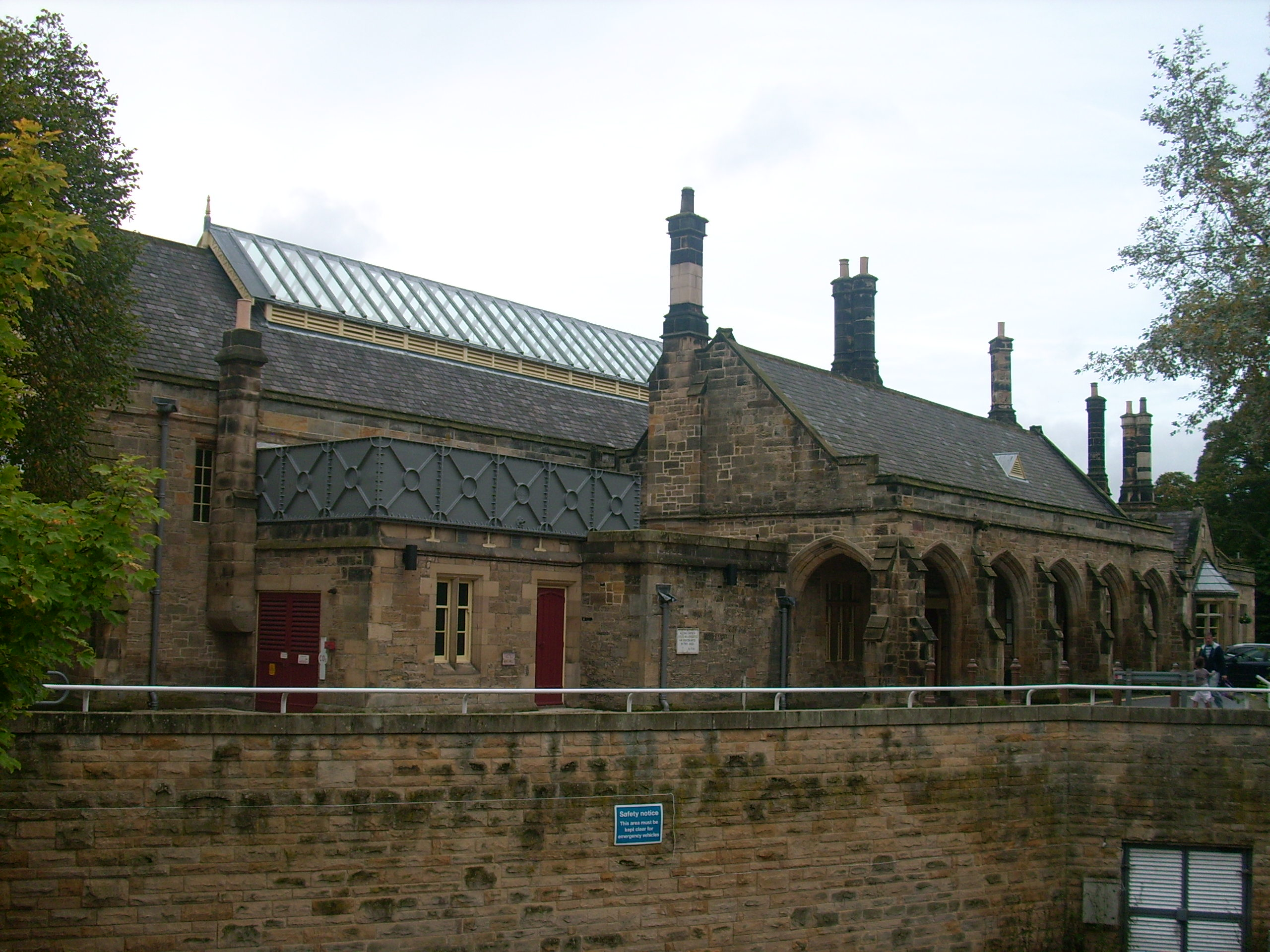

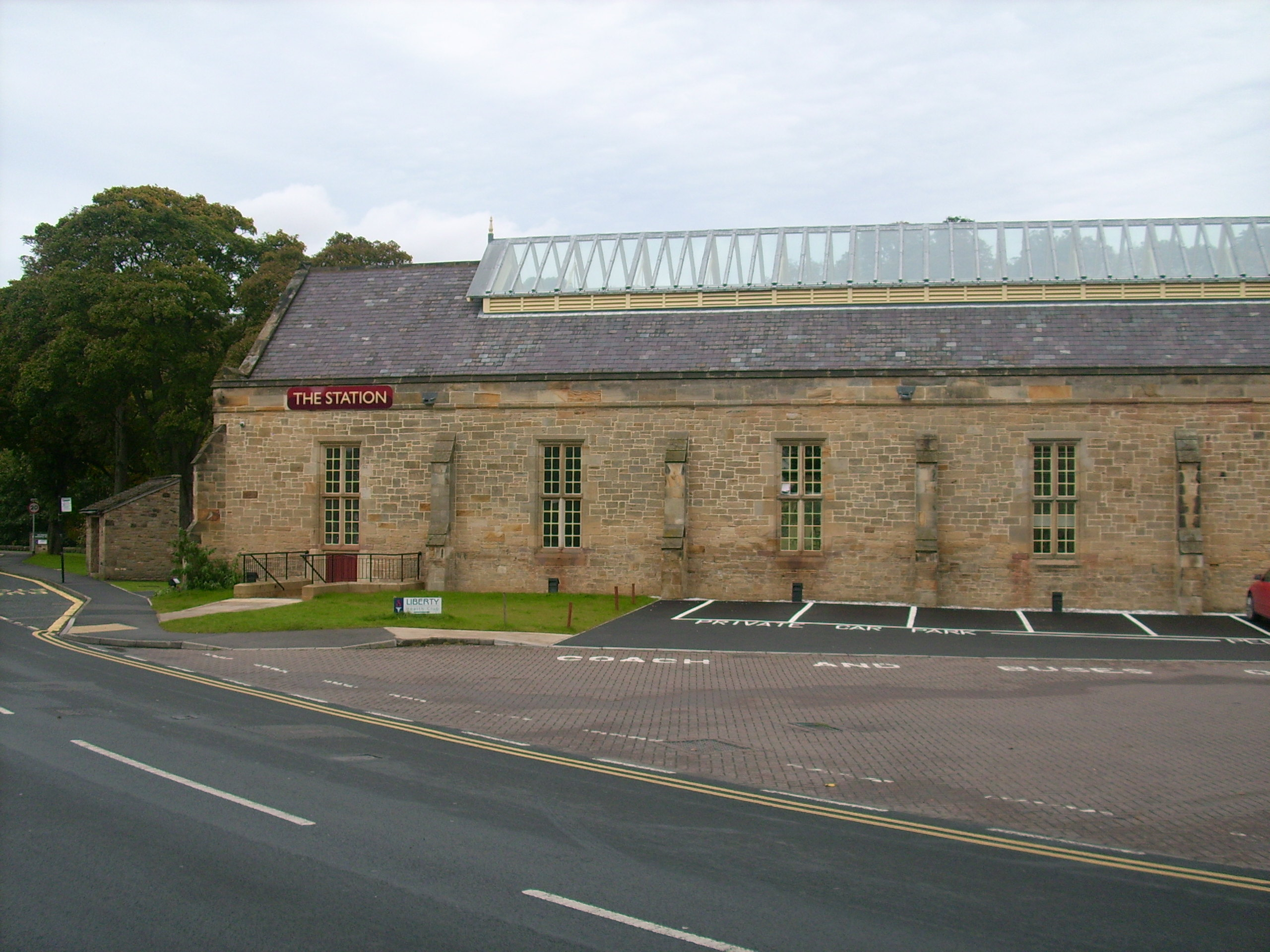

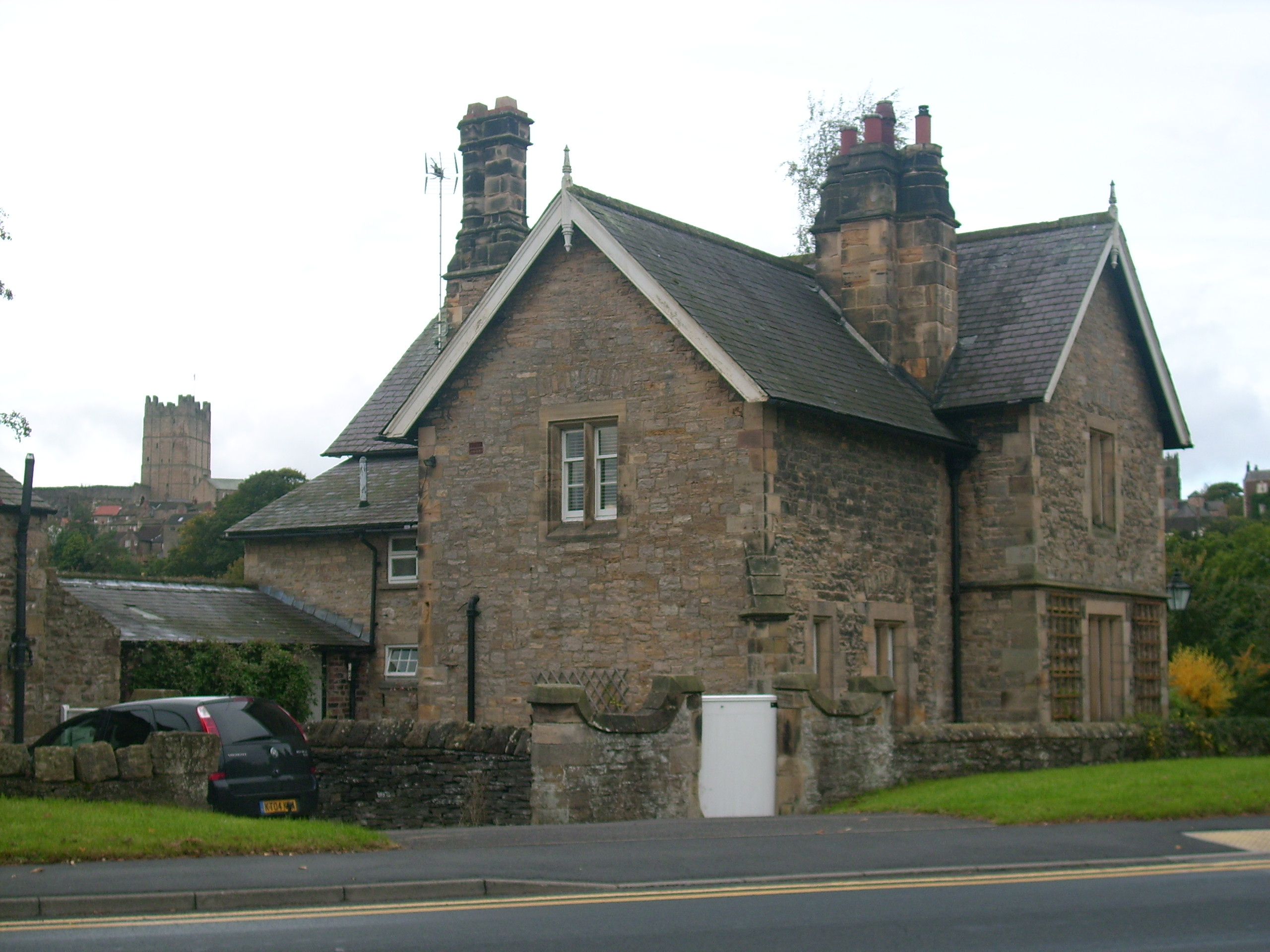

Preceding station	Disused railways	Following station
Catterick Bridge	Eryholme-Richmond branch line	Terminus
