= St. Martin's Priory, Richmond =

Monastic house in North Yorkshire, England

Coordinates: 54°24′06.7″N 1°43′40.8″W

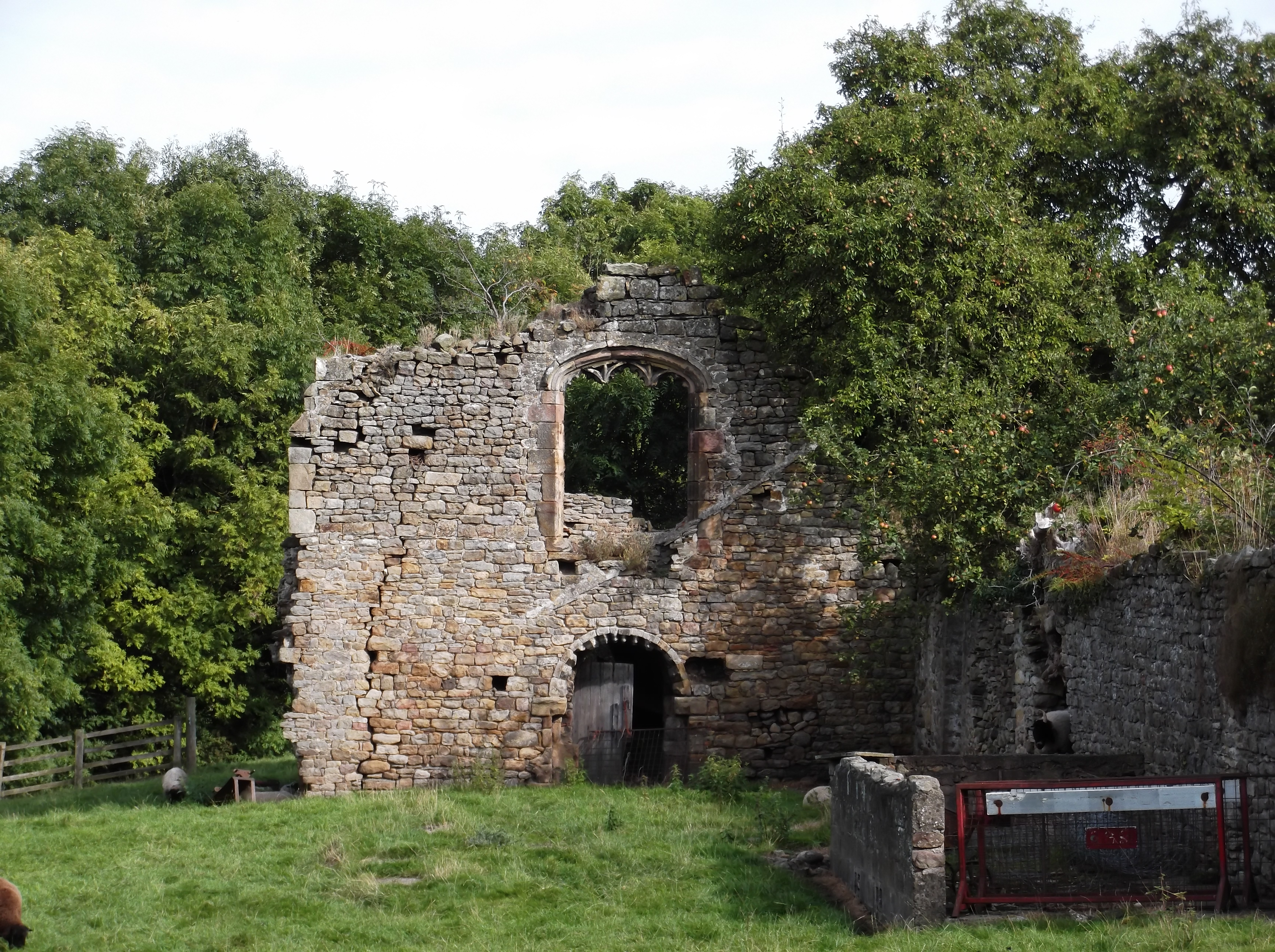
Remains of St Martin's Priory, Richmond

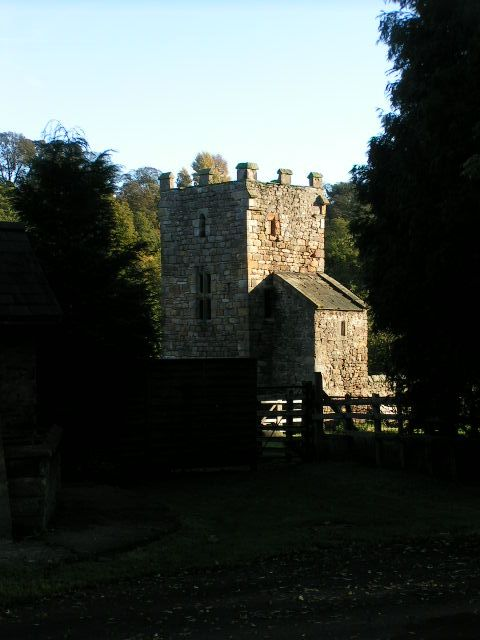
15th century Priory gateway tower

St. Martin's Priory, Richmond was a medieval monastic house in North Yorkshire, England. It was a Benedictine house, founded about 1100, originally for 9 or 10 monks, dependent on St Mary's Abbey, York. As one of the lesser monastic houses, it was dissolved in 1539.

The priory remains are in sandstone. The former church walls contain a round-arched doorway with two orders and scalloped capitals. A tower-like structure, dating from the 15th century, has three storeys, one bay and quoins. It contains a doorway with a pointed arch and a chamfered moulded surround, a cross window above, and a vent on the top floor.

== See also ==
- Grade I listed buildings in North Yorkshire (district)
- Listed buildings in St Martin's, North Yorkshire
