= Mercury Bridge =

Road bridge in North Yorkshire

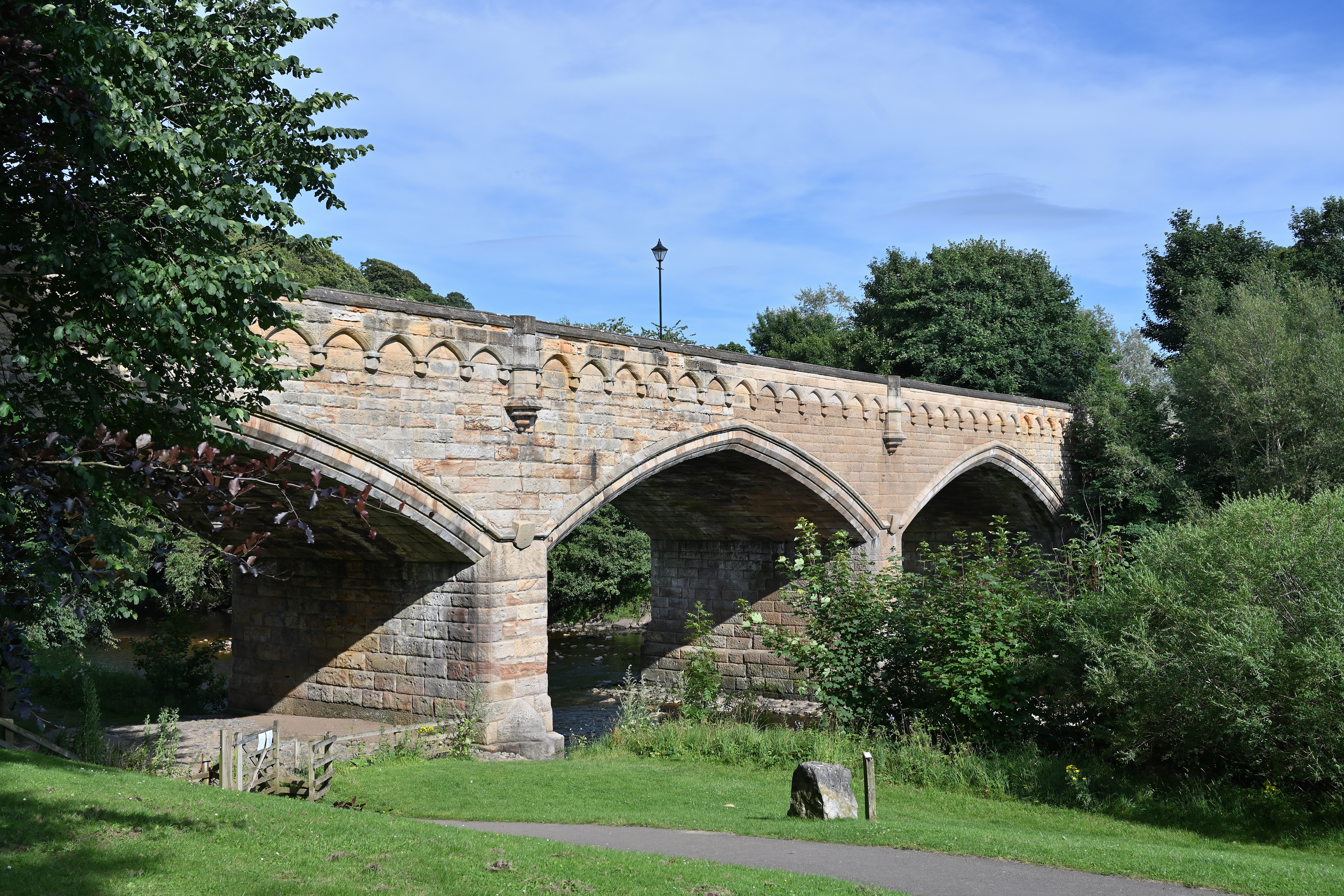
- Mercury Bridge
- Coordinates: 54.40403°N 1.73088°W
- OS grid reference: NZ175009
- Carries: A6136 road
- Crosses: River Swale
- Locale: Richmond, North Yorkshire, England
- Other name: Station Bridge
- Named for: Royal Signals

History
- Opened: 1846

Statistics

Listed Building – Grade II
- Designated: 4 February 1969
- Reference no.: 1317112

Location
- Interactive map of Mercury Bridge

Mercury Bridge (also known as Station Bridge), is a grade II listed structure that crosses the River Swale in North Yorkshire, connecting the town of Richmond to the south side of the river. The bridge was commissioned by the railway company whose Richmond railway station terminus lay across the river, and so provided ease of access to Richmond town where there had not been a bridge before. The bridge now carries the A6136 road and was renamed from Station Bridge in 1975 in honour of the Royal Corps of Signals (whose cap badge has a winged Mercury motif). The bridge was noted for being one of a few railway-owned bridges which carried no rails.

== History ==
The Great North of England Railway company received assent to build a line from Eryholme (Note: Originally, the junction was known as Dalton, being renamed to Eryholme in 1901.) on their main line (later the East Coast Main Line), to Richmond in 1845. Richmond was the terminus of the branch, and besides the station building, it had a vast array of buildings designed by George Townsend Andrews, including the bridge for which he had overall responsibility. The structural design of the bridge was carried out by the office of Robert Stephenson.

Mercury Bridge was a rarity in England being a bridge owned by a railway company, for which no rails were laid. It was built purely for the public to access the station area, which lay in a different parish to that of Richmond, on the south side of the River Swale. (Note: Similar ventures whereby bridges were built to allow access and egress to stations (Keswick and Cleckheaton Spen). Mercury Bridge was later acquired by the county council and had been made into an A Road, which others have not.) Until the building of Mercury Bridge (then station Bridge) in 1846, the only river crossing at Richmond was the Green Bridge, which carried the Richmond to Lancaster Turnpike. For nearly seventy years, the bridge carried the road to the railway station. During the First World War, a contingent of Italian prisoners of war extended the road to Catterick Garrison which eventually became known as the A6136 road.

Mercury Bridge has four arches of 52-foot (16 m) each, 30 feet (9.1 m) wide, and the roadway is 20 feet (6.1 m) across, and when built, had footpaths on either side of the bridge deck. In 1920, the bridge was adopted by the local authority (North Riding, then in 1974, North Yorkshire), however, it still retained its old North Eastern Railway bridge plates (No. 8).

The bridge has four chamfered pointed arches, each 52 feet (16 m) long, and the parapet is decorated with matching modillions. The parapet used to have several octagonal columns which protruded out from the piers above the parapet level, and housed gas lamps. Today, the gas lamp lights don't exist anymore as they have been removed with more efficient and modern designs. Severe flooding on the River Swale in the year 2000 damaged the central pier when the riverbed was swept away during the inundation, closing the bridge for several months. The repairs were carried out to the bridge's stonework which you can observe today as the repaired stonework is quite visible amongst the older stonework of the bridge.

In 1975, the bridge was renamed to Mercury Bridge in honour of the Royal Corps of Signals 50th anniversary. The regiment was based locally in Catterick and a winged Mercury is the regimental motif as adorned on their cap badge.

Apart from crossing the River Swale, a staircase on the eastern side provides access to green spaces adjoining the south bank of the river.

== See also ==
- Listed buildings in St Martin's, North Yorkshire
- List of crossings of the River Swale

== Notes ==
Bridges over the River Swale
Upstream: Green Bridge	Downstream: Easby Bridge
