= Catterick Bridge =

Bridge and hamlet in North Yorkshire, England

Coordinates: 54°23′19″N 1°38′58″W

- Location within North Yorkshire
- OS grid reference: SE227992
- Civil parish: Brough with St Giles
- Unitary authority: North Yorkshire
- Ceremonial county: North Yorkshire
- Region: Yorkshire and the Humber
- Country: England
- Sovereign state: United Kingdom
- Post town: Richmond
- Postcode district: DL10
- Police: North Yorkshire
- Fire: North Yorkshire
- Ambulance: Yorkshire

Catterick Bridge is a hamlet about 1-mile (1.6 km) north of Catterick, at the south end of Catterick road bridge.

The hamlet includes Catterick Racecourse and a few houses. The Sunday market, held at the racecourse, was once the largest of its kind in Northern England. After declining fortunes, the market closed in 2016.

The former Bridge House Hotel currently stands derelict after a fire destroyed a vast majority of the Grade II listed building in 2014. There had been a coaching inn at this site since at least the 16th century. After several attempts to auction the property, it was removed from the market, in October 2020, due to lack of interest.

Charles Macintosh, the inventor of the Mackintosh raincoat, Sir John Beresford, 1st Baronet and William Beresford, 1st Viscount Beresford were educated at Catterick Bridge.

== See also ==
- Listed buildings in Brough with St Giles

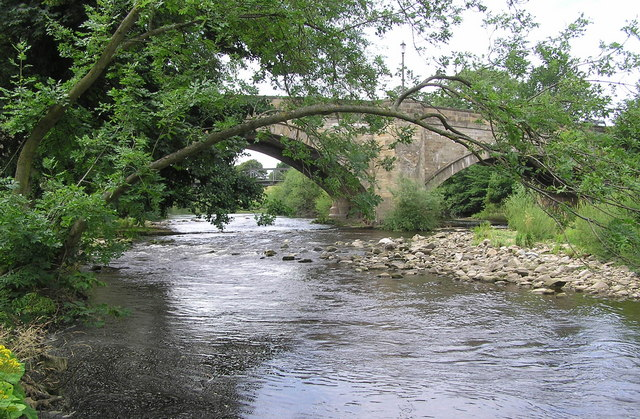
The old Catterick Bridge across the River Swale

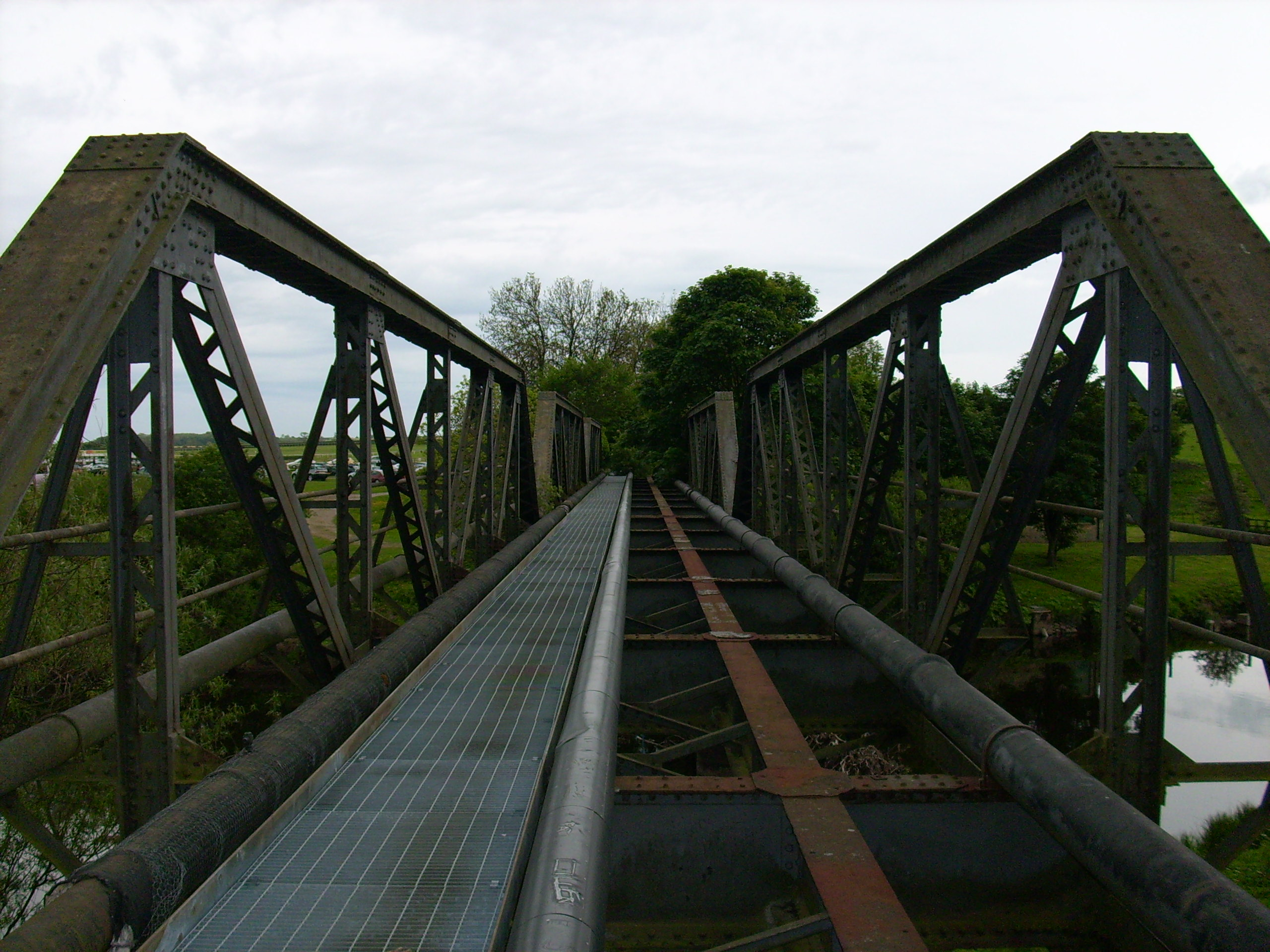
The Catterick rail bridge over the River Swale
