= Catterick Bridge (bridge) =

Historic bridge in North Yorkshire, England

Coordinates: 54°23′22″N 1°39′05″W

The bridge, in 2009

Catterick Bridge is a historic bridge over the River Swale in North Yorkshire, in England.

The bridge was constructed between 1421 and 1425, with funding from William de Burgh and seven other local nobles. In 1505, St Anne's bridge chapel was built to the east of the south end of the bridge. The southern pillar of the bridge fell into disrepair, and in 1562 Roger Burgh and two other nobles agreed to fund repairs. These were completed in 1590, but in 1674 the bridge was again recorded as being in poor repair.

In 1792, John Carr of York widened the bridge by 13 feet, on the downstream side, and demolished the chapel. He also refaced the north and south arches on the upstream side. In 1914, the Catterick Military Railway was laid across the western carriageway of the bridge, but in 1922 a dedicated railway bridge was constructed a little further upstream. In 1969, the bridge was Grade II* listed.

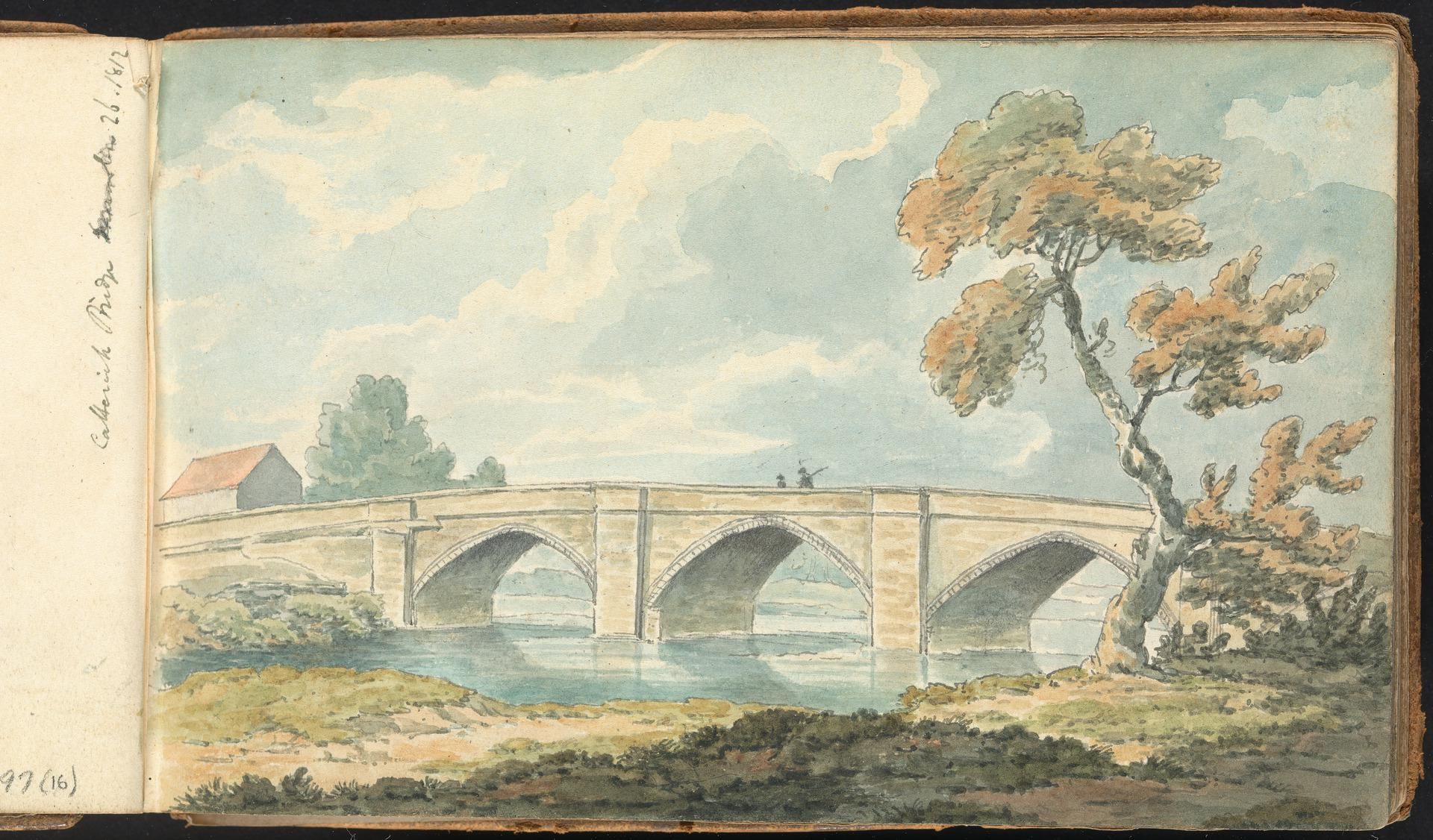
The bridge, painted by Thomas Bradshaw in the early 19th century

The bridge now carries Catterick Road, the A6136. It was formerly part of the A1, which now crosses the Swale a short distance upstream to the west. It is built of sandstone and consists of three arches, slightly pointed on the older, upstream, side. It has triangular cutwaters with hollow chamfered tops, rising to canted pedestrian retreats, a band, and parapets with triangular coping, ending in circular bollards.

== See also ==
- Grade II* listed buildings in North Yorkshire (district)
- Listed buildings in Brough with St Giles
- List of crossings of the River Swale
