= Ferrensby =

Village and civil parish in North Yorkshire, England

Coordinates: 54°02′N 1°26′W

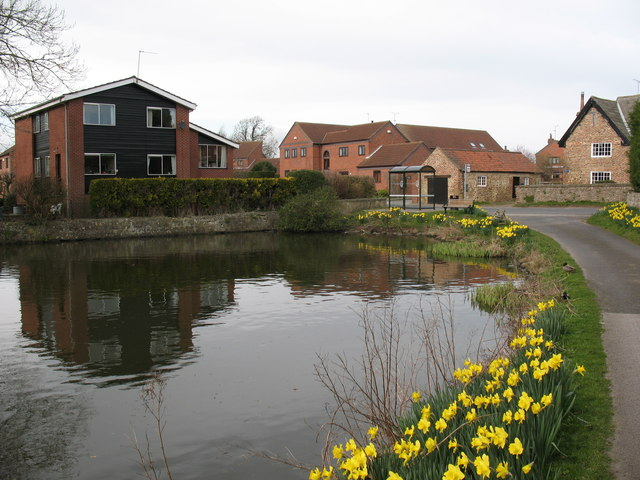
Village pond in Ferrensby

Ferrensby is a village and civil parish in the county of North Yorkshire, England. The population of the civil parish at the 2011 census was 187. It is about 3 miles (4.8 km) north-east of Knaresborough and near the A1(M) motorway. Nearby attractions include a balloon centre and a maze.

The origin of the place-name is from Old Norse and probably means "farmstead or village of the man from the Faroe Islands", and appears as Feresbi in the Domesday Book of 1086.

Until 1974 it was part of the West Riding of Yorkshire. From 1974 to 2023 it was part of the Borough of Harrogate, it is now administered by the unitary North Yorkshire Council.

The village has a public house called The General Tarleton which was named after Banastre Tarleton, a British general who fought on the loyalist side during the American War of Independence.
