= A6136 road =

A-road in North Yorkshire, England

Coordinates: 54.3739°N 1.7172°W

A6136

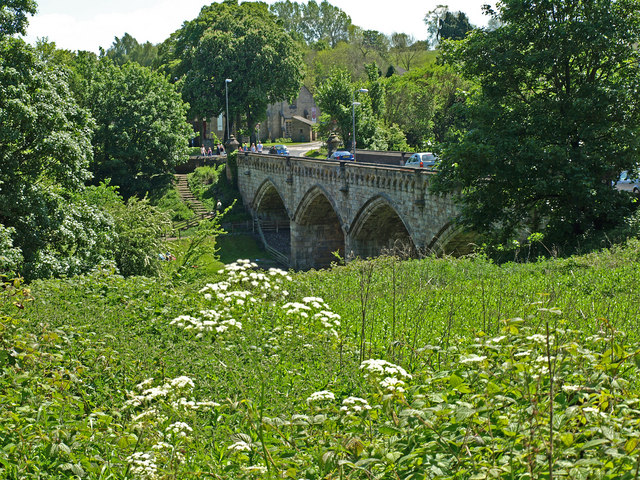
- A6136 leaving Richmond and crossing the River Swale over Mercury Bridge

Route information
- Length: 9.3 mi (15.0 km)

Major junctions
- North end: Richmond
- A6108 A6055
- South East end: Catterick

Location
- Country: United Kingdom
- Constituent country: England

Road network
- Roads in the United Kingdom; Motorways; A and B road zones
← A6135	→ A6137

The A6136 is a 4 digit A road in North Yorkshire, England. It runs between the A6108 Queen's Road, in the market town of Richmond, before terminating on the A6055 in Catterick, near the A1(M) Junction 52.

== Route ==
The A6136 begins in the market town of Richmond as "Station Road" and crosses Mercury Bridge. This refers to the old station that used to be present on this road. Moving on, it reaches the outer suburbs of Richmond. Passing through sparse woodland, it soon enters the outer suburbs of another town, Catterick Garrison; this is the main road through the town. The road passes the town centre of the garrison and goes through its suburbs, Colburn (including Walkerville) and Brough with St Giles. This section is renowned locally for being congested with commuters, military personnel and children going to school. A relief road has been suggested by local councillors. Just after leaving Brough it used to cross over the A1 road uniquely splitting off in two directions, the south heading for Catterick Village and the north heading for Brompton-on-Swale, both meeting the A1 southbound and northbound.

== A1(M) motorway upgrade ==
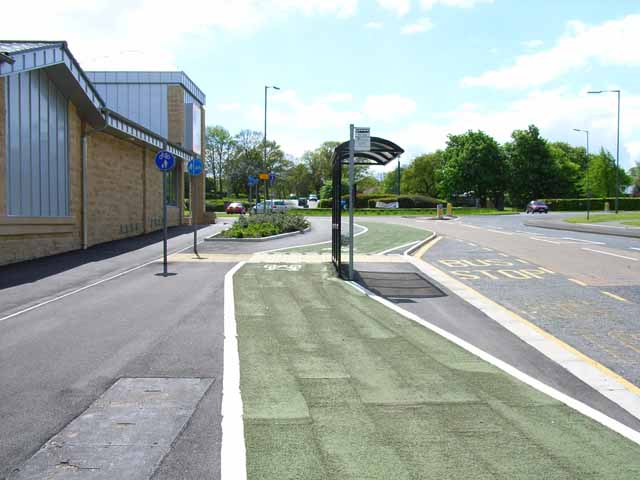
Bus stop in A6136 in Catterick Garrison town centre

With the A1(M) upgrade from Leeming to Barton, the A6136 now meets the A6055 Local Access Road (LAR) west of the motorway and goes across a new overbridge which replaced the old Fort Bridge. The A6055 and the A6136 run together as the A6055 through Catterick Bridge and utilising the old northern A1 junction to form a new LAR on the west side of the new motorway. This northern route connects with the A6108 road just south of Scotch Corner. The old south fork from Catterick Bridge to Marne Barracks is now an unclassified road.

== History ==
The former Fort railway bridge was removed intact and was to be used by the Wensleydale Railway in bridging a gap just west of Redmire station. However, after a period of storage in the car park of Redmire Station, it was discovered that the bridge was unsuitable and it has since been broken up.
