= Charles Beatson =

New Zealand architect (1846–1927)

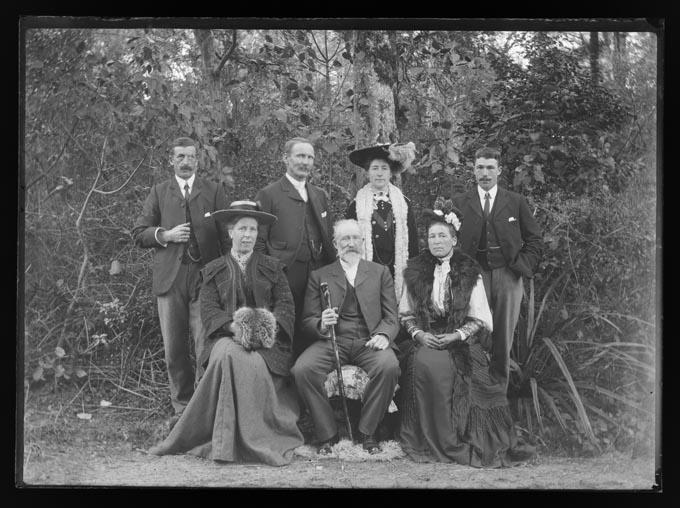
- Beatson Family, Charles is in centre at front
- Born: 1846; London, England
- Died: 1927 (aged 81); Ngatimoti, Waimea County New Zealand
- Occupation: Architect
- Years active: 1851–1889

Charles Edward Beatson (1846–1927) was a New Zealand architect who worked in the Colonial Architect's office. Beatson took over his father's, William Beatson, practice following his death and was initially active in the Nelson Province before moving to Wellington to work as William Clayton's assistant. Following the death of Clayton Beatson was assistant to his successor, Pierre Burrows, before eventually heading the office himself. Beatson eventually left the office and went into a private practice before retiring to Ngatimoti. Most of Beatson's work did not survive although several buildings he worked on have heritage status.

== Early life ==
Charles Edward Beatson was born in 1846 in London as the son of William Beatson, a London architect. Beatson arrived in Lyttelton, New Zealand with his father 8 September 1851.

== Architectural career ==
Beatson trained under his father until his father's death in 1870. Beatson then took over his father's portfolio in Richmond and Nelson. Including work on the Holy Trinity Church in Richmond.

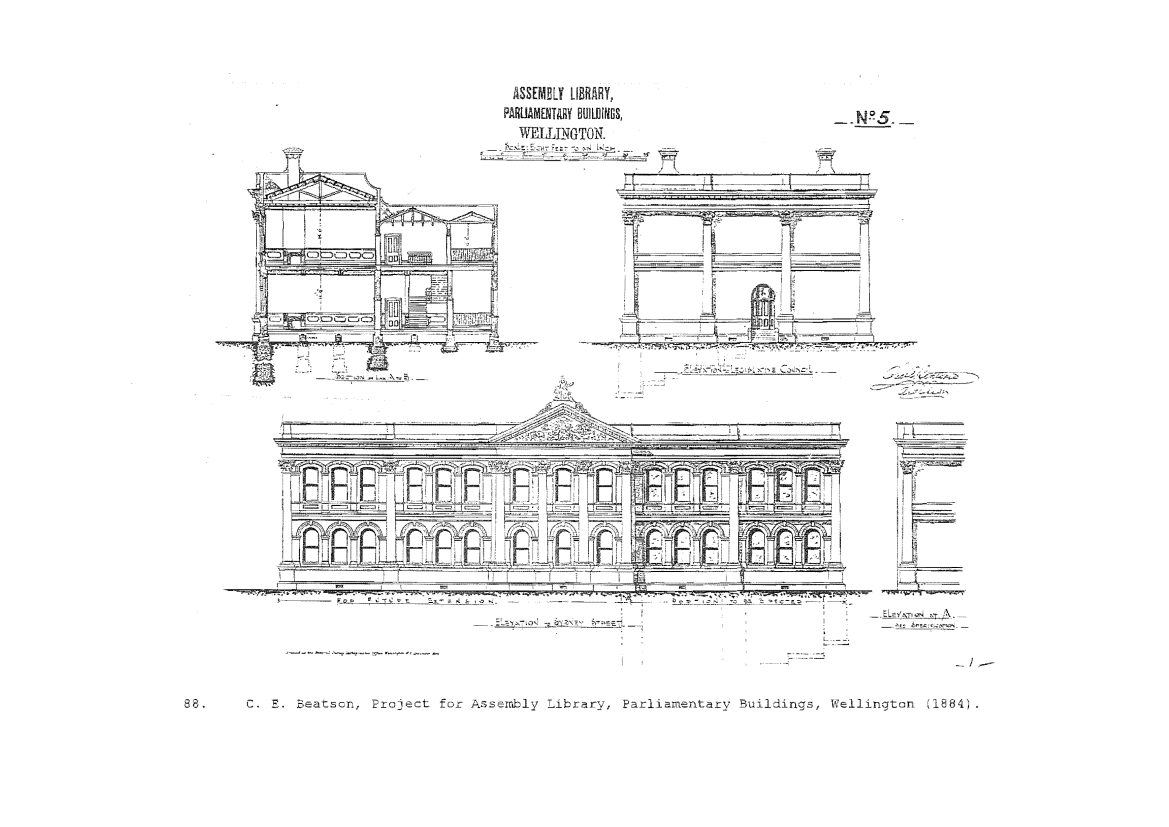
Beatson's design for the General Assembly Library building

In May 1873 Beatson took up a role in Wellington as assistant to William Clayton, the Colonial Architect. After Clayton's death in 1877 Beatson was assistant to his successor, Pierre Burrows. After Burrows lost the role in 1884 Beatson held the position and titled himself as Colonial Architect. (Note: Despite Beatson referring to himself as the Colonial Architect and a newspaper referring to him as such it is unknown whether he actually held the position; officially only William Clayton ever held the position of Colonial Architect.) In 1884 Beatson drafted an Italianate for the General Assembly Library, although the building was never constructed under Beatson's design. In 1886 Beatson became director of the Petone & Hutt Building & Investment Company. Following his departure from the position of Colonial Architect on 31 August 1887 he established his own private practice in Wellington, designing 28 buildings. His last known work was on 11 December 1888 and he left Wellington in 1889.

Beatson was a juror for the 1885 New Zealand Exhibition's architectural competitions.

== Retirement and personal life ==
Beatson was recorded as living in Ngatimoti at the 1890 election with his occupation listed as architect. Beatson owned land at Ngatimoti with his brother Arthur. By 1893 election his occupation was listed as farmer. Beatson designed several homes in Ngatimoti including his own retirement home. His family home remains but the other Ngatimoti buildings have been demolished.

In 1876 Beatson married Mary Alice Guy. Beatson died in 1927 at Ngatimoti.

== Legacy ==
Holy Trinity Church, Richmond has a memorial window to Beatson; Beatson designed the Holy Trinity Church.

== List of works ==
Name	Date	Image	Note	Ref
All Saints' Church, Nelson	1871		William Beatson designed the church and Charles Edward Beatson designed the chancel.	
Holy Trinity Church, Richmond	1872		Designed by William Beatson originally and following his death Charles Edward Beatson removed the chancel, vestry, and belfry to save costs. These were all later added to the church. An addition to the rear of the church was designed by a different architect, possibly based on designs by Beatson.	
Nelson Asylum	c.1873			
The Wigwam	c.1877		Personal home for Beatson and his family. Demolished in 2018	
St James Church, Lower Hutt	1880		Destroyed by fire in 1946	
Nelson College for Girls	1883			
Te Matai Native School	c.1885			
Government Printing Office	1884–1896		Only partially completed. Expanded and significantly altered in 1896 by John Campbell. Demolished in 1962.	
Whau Lunatic Asylum extension wing	c.1885		Now demolished	
Petone Town Board office	1886			
Rangiora Post Office	1887		Demolished in 1934	
Wellington Post Office	1887		Beatson was the architect for the restoration/reconstruction of the original building designed by Thomas Turnbull that was destroyed by fire.	
Port Chalmers Municipal Building	1889		Registered as a category 1 building with Heritage New Zealand	
