= William Beatson =

New Zealand architect (1807–1870)

William Beatson (1807 – 13 January 1870) was a London-trained architect who immigrated to New Zealand. He adapted contemporary English building design to meet the rigors of the New Zealand environment.

== Early life ==
William Beatson was born 8 September 1807 in Kent, England, the son of David Beatson, a Rotherhithe shipbreaker. Beatson's family was upper-class with his grandfather being laird of Kilrie, Fife County. Beatson attended either Eton College or King's College London. (Note: Beatson's name does not appear in any records of Eton College nor is he known to have socialised with Etonians in Nelson, New Zealand. Beatson sent his own son to King's College making it the more likely he attended King's College.)

== Architectural career ==
=== England ===
Beatson pursued a career in architecture under the tutorship of John Wallen — Beatson apprenticed with Wallen's firm in the late 1820s and by 1836 was a partner in the firm. Beatson's time in the firm likely influenced his architectural philosophy. Beatson was admitted to the Royal Academy in 1832 following a recommendation from Wallen. His time at the academy would have given him a deeper appreciation of the Classical and Gothic architecture. By 1836 Beatson was a partner in Wallen's firm. Beatson designed some residential buildings during this period but none are extant.

By the late 1830s Beatson had established his own practice—on Bartholomew Lane—and was engaged in surveying work alongside architecture. Little is known about Beatson's career during this period and any buildings he designed are probably no longer extant.

=== New Zealand ===
On 8 September 1851 William Beatson arrived at Lyttelton, New Zealand with his family aboard the Midlothian and journeyed by boat to Nelson, arriving 7 November. Beatson's motivation for moving was to establish a rural life with a farm and for health reasons. (Note: At the time a good climate was believed to assist with health. Beatson was deaf and had diabetes mellitus.) After arriving in Nelson, Beatson lived in Suburban South (Later renamed to Stoke) with his family. Beatson's first building designed in New Zealand was likely Guthrie Grange his private home. Despite designing his own home Beatson is not known to have practiced architecture until 1857 and did not record his profession as architect on the rates roll until 1859. Beatson likely returned to architecture due to the poor finances of his farm.

Beatson understood the desire of his fellow settlers to retain the comfort of "Englishness" in their new homeland. However, he also understood the challenges and advantages of the New Zealand environment. This was a land prone to earthquakes that could damage, if not destroy, buildings built from stone; but unlike Victorian Britain, New Zealand had an abundance of timber. Beatson was probably persuaded by the Gothic revival that was influencing many of his contemporaries in England, therefore, his new work often utilised carved timber columns. However, instead of the traditional use of stone, he developed his own weatherboard walls to infill and brace his structures.

William Beatson was Nelson's most prolific architect. His contributions included the Wesleyan Church, additions to Christ Church Cathedral (1859), the Union Bank of Australia, the Anglican Church at Richmond, St Barnabas Church at Stoke and several residences. He also designed several commercial buildings; his first project being a warehouse and offices for Morrison and Sclanders in Hardy Street (1863). Beatson's commercial buildings reflected a familiarity with the Italianate style that he acquired while working with Wallen.

In 1859, Beatson was engaged to design Nelson College. Constrained by a budget and also torn between the potential risk to such a large number of students in the event of fire or earthquake, Beatson opted for a wooden building in a modest Jacobian style. The college was completed in 1861, but it was destroyed by fire in 1904 and the handsome new brick replacement was seriously damaged in the 1929 Murchison earthquake. This building was eventually replaced with a concrete structure.

Beatson died 13 January 1870 and his son, Charles Beatson, took over his practice and contracts.

== Personal life ==
Beatson married Maria Wallen, John Wallen's daughter, at St Botolph-without-Bishopsgate June 16 1830.

Beatson was a lay preacher and often requested to preach at the churches he designed. Beatson was a Low Church Protestant. (Note: The Cambridge Camden Society disapproved of architects working on the churches of Dissenters and Beatson preached at Protestant churches of different denominations. Many immigrants to Nelson were non-Conformists)

== Legacy ==
A memorial plaque to Beatson is located in St Barnabas' Church, Stoke; Beatson had designed the church.

== List of works ==
Name	Date	Image	Note	Ref
Surrey Canal School	1849		Demolished	
St Paul's Chapel, Rotherhithe	1850		Demolished	
Hardy Street Wesleyan Chapel	1857		Demolished 1889. Beatson designed an enlargement in 1866. Beatson also designed a Sunday school and parsonage for the church.	
Nelson College	1859		Destroyed in 1904 by fire	
Stanton House	1862		Still extant	
Morrison Sclanders and Co. Building	1863		Registered as a category 2 building with Heritage New Zealand. Some elements of the building have been altered such as the addition of a parapet, plastering of the north facade, and the demolition of the loggia.	
Oamaru House	1863			
Edwards and Company building	1864		Still extant but most detailing has been removed	
St Peter's Church, Wakapuaka	1864		May not have been constructed	
St Barnabas' Church, Stoke	1864		Significantly altered in 1960 to where the original church is now the chancel and sanctuary of the current building. Registered as a category 2 building with Heritage New Zealand	
Tasman Street schoolroom	1864			
Hillwood (Wakapuaka)	1866		Registered as a category 2 building with Heritage New Zealand	
Black, Campbell & Black store	1867		Not extant	
All Saints' Church, Nelson	1868		Designed by Beatson but his son, Charles Beatson, took over the job after his death and designed the chancel.	
Holy Trinity Church, Richmond	1872		Designed by William Beatson originally and following his death Charles Beatson removed the chancel, vestry, and belfry to save costs. These were all later added to the church. An addition to the rear of the church was designed by a different architect, possibly based on designs by Beatson. Registered as a category 2 building with Heritage New Zealand	
St Paul's Church, Brightwater	1865		Beatson only designed the porch for the church	
