= Listed buildings in Richmond, North Yorkshire (central area) =

Richmond is a civil parish in the county of North Yorkshire, England. It contains over 340 listed buildings that are recorded in the National Heritage List for England. Of these, four are listed at Grade I, the highest of the three grades, 17 are at Grade II*, the middle grade, and the others are at Grade II, the lowest grade. The parish contains the market town of Richmond and the surrounding countryside. Among the more important buildings in the parish are Richmond Castle, Holy Trinity Church, which has been largely converted into the Green Howards Regimental Museum, Greyfriars Tower, the remaining part of a medieval friary, and the Georgian Theatre Royal, a theatre that has been restored largely to its original state; all these are listed at Grade I.

Most of the other listed buildings are houses, cottages, shops, offices and associated structures, and the rest include churches and chapels, bridges, two remaining arches from the Town Walls, an almshouse, a warehouse, hotels and public houses, memorials, including two war memorials, a cross in the Market Place, remaining buildings on the former Richmond Racecourse, a water reservoir, school buildings, a former officers' quarters, and cobblestones on roadways.

This list contains the listed buildings in the centre of the town, including Market Place and the streets around it, and Newbiggin and the area south of it. The listed buildings to the north and in the surrounding countryside can be found in Listed buildings in Richmond, North Yorkshire (north and outer areas).

== Key ==
Grade	Criteria
I	Buildings of exceptional interest, sometimes considered to be internationally important
II*	Particularly important buildings of more than special interest
II	Buildings of national importance and special interest

== Buildings ==
Name and location	Photograph	Date	Notes	Grade
Richmond Castle; 54.40211°N 1.73762°W		11th century	The major remaining part of the castle is the keep, with the gatehouse below. It is just over 100 feet (30 m) tall, and has two-storey turrets and battlements. The grounds are enclosed by a curtain wall, which contains towers and postern gates. In the southeast corner are the remains of the Great Hall.	I
The Bar; 54.40181°N 1.73914°W		c. 1312	The archway is part of the original Town Walls. It is in stone and consists of a semicircular arch with a chamfered surround. On the west side are buttresses.	II*
Holy Trinity Church; 54.40309°N 1.73756°W		14th century	The church has been altered and extended through the centuries, and part of it has been converted into the Green Howards Regimental Museum. It is in stone, and consists of a west tower, a nave and a chancel. The tower, originally detached from the church, has been linked to the nave by modern office buildings. Amongst its features is an embattled parapet pierced by quatrefoils, with corner and central crocketed finials.	I
7 and 7A The Bar; 54.40188°N 1.73911°W	—	17th century	The house is in colourwashed brick on stone. The entrance is up a flight of stone steps within the building, through an archway with a moulded flat arched lintel and squared imposts.	II
Warehouse behind 60 Market Place; 54.40297°N 1.73562°W	—	Late 17th century (probable)	The warehouse is in stone with a corrugated sheet roof. There are two storeys and a loft, and three internal bays. The openings include doors, windows and a loading bay.	II
5 Bridge Street and 1 The Green; 54.40122°N 1.74041°W		1689	The building, on a corner site, is in roughcast stone, and has a Welsh slate roof. There are three storeys and an attic, two bays on Bridge Street, and one on The Green. On the Bridge Street front is a doorway with a four-centred arch and a dated lintel. On each front is a sundial and a shop window, and the other windows are sashes with keystones.	II
27 and 29 Castle Hill; 54.40190°N 1.73870°W		Late 17th to early 18th century	A pair of stone houses with a pantile roof. There are two storeys and four bays. On the front are two doorways with rectangular fanlights, to their right is a tripartite window, and on the upper floor are sash windows.	II
4 Bridge Street; 54.40103°N 1.74025°W		Early 18th century	The house is in stone with a pantile roof, and has three storeys and two bays. The central doorway has a divided fanlight, the windows are sashes, and all the openings have stone surrounds and rusticated keystones.	II
15 Bridge Street; 54.40152°N 1.74026°W		Early 18th century	A house on a hill, in stone with a floor band and a stone slate roof with kneelers. There are four storeys on the left and three on the right, and three bays, and a narrow angled two-storey single-bay extension on the right. Steps lead up to the central doorway and to is right is a bay window with fluted pilasters and an ornamental frieze. The windows are sash windows in stone surrounds. The doorway and the windows on the upper three floors have rusticated keystones. The extension contains a doorway, above which is a window and a parapet.	II*
9 Market Place; 54.40346°N 1.73706°W		Early 18th century	The shop is in red brick, with rusticated quoins, a heavy cornice, and a slate roof. There are two storeys and four bays. On the ground floor is a modern shopfront, the upper floor contains sash windows with moulded surrounds and small keystones. On the roof are four dormers, the outer pair with segmental pediments, and the inner pair with triangular pediments.	II*
21 Trinity Church Square; 54.40302°N 1.73705°W		Early 18th century	A shop on a corner site, it is in painted stucco on a plinth, with rusticated quoins and a Welsh slate roof. There are three storeys, three bays on the east front and two on the south front. The upper floors contain sash windows with keystones. On the south front is a canted bay window on the left. To the right is an 18th century shopfront containing a central door with a traceried fanlight, a moulded cornice, and a small pediment, on rendered stall risers. The east front has a 19th century shop window with a panelled base, and to the right is a doorway with pilasters and a dentilled cornice, approached by steps with iron handrails. Further to the right is a canted bay window with a dentilled cornice.	II*
King's Head Hotel; 54.40350°N 1.73728°W		Early 18th century	The hotel, on a corner site, is in red brick, rendered on the left return, with stone dressings, a plinth with moulded capping, rusticated quoins, a moulded eaves cornice and a hipped stone slate roof. There are three storeys and eight bays. The central doorway has a moulded shouldered architrave, a doorway in the left bay has a plain surround, and both have a decorative frieze and pediment. The windows are sashes with moulded frames and sills, and keystones.	II*
19 Castle Hill; 54.40201°N 1.73859°W		1739	The house is colourwashed, and has three storeys and two bays. On the left is a doorway over which is a dated plaque, to its right is a bow window, and further to the right is a blocked doorway and a small-paned window. The middle floor contains sash windows, and on the top floor are horizontally sliding sashes.	II
6–8 Trinity Church Square; 54.40319°N 1.73747°W		1740	Originally the north aisle of Holy Trinity Church, later part of the Green Howards Regiment, it is in stone, with floor bands, two storeys, and four bays divided by stepped buttresses. The main doorway, with a pointed arch, is in the right bay, and there is a smaller round-arched doorway on the extreme left. The other bays contain windows, that in the left bay with a round-arched head, and the others with pointed arches. On the left three bays of the upper storey are windows with pointed arches, and above them is a parapet.	II
1 Bargate; 54.40179°N 1.74025°W		18th century	The cottage is in rendered stone and has a tile roof. There are two storeys and one bay. Steps lead up to the doorway on the right, with a small fanlight. Immediately to the left is a bay window, with a fascia over it and the doorway. The upper floor contains a casement window.	II
11 and 13 Bargate; 54.40205°N 1.74036°W		18th century	Two buildings in stone, with slate roofs and two storeys. The left building has three bays, a shopfront on the ground floor, and sash windows. The right building is lower and roughcast. It contains a doorway on the left, windows, a loading door, and a cart entry on the right.	II
26 and 30 Bargate; 54.40277°N 1.74013°W		Mid-18th century	A pair of houses in stone with a stone slate roof. There are two storeys and four bays. On the front are three doorways, the middle one a passage doorway. The windows in the left house are sashes, in the right house they are casements, and all the openings have keystones.	II
41 Bargate; 54.40292°N 1.74057°W		Mid-18th century	The house is in stone faced with brick, on a stone plinth, with a Welsh slate roof. There are four bays of the same height, the right three bays with three storeys, and the left bay with two storeys. In the right bay is a doorway with a traceried fanlight and a moulded modillion pediment on brackets, and to its right is a passage doorway. On the ground floor of the left bay is a small bow window, and the windows elsewhere are sashes with rendered wedge lintels. In front of the house are iron railings and a gate.	II
53 Bargate; 54.40342°N 1.74055°W		18th century	The cottage is in roughcast stone with a pantile roof. There are two storeys and one bay. On each floor is a modern casement window, to the left, steps lead up to the doorway, and there is a passage door to the right.	II
55 Bargate; 54.40344°N 1.74052°W		18th century	The cottage is in stone, faced with painted red brick, and has quoins, string courses, and a pantile roof. There are three storeys and one bay. The doorway is on the right, and there is a sash window on each floor.	II
7 and 9 Bridge Street; 54.40128°N 1.74035°W		Mid-18th century	A pair of roughcast cottages with a stone slate roof. There are two storeys and two bays. On the front are two doorways, in the right bay is a bow window, and the other windows are sashes.	II
11 Bridge Street; 54.40135°N 1.74034°W		18th century	The house is rendered and has a Welsh slate roof. There are two storeys and two bays. The doorway is in the right bay, and the windows are small-pane casements.	II
2–6 Carters Yard; 54.40338°N 1.74139°W	—	18th century	A row of five cottages with one and two storeys, and roofs of slate, stone slate and pantile. Most of the windows are sashes, some are horizontally sliding, and there is one casement window.	II
5 and 7 Castle Hill; 54.40225°N 1.73824°W		18th century	A pair of shops in stone, with rusticated quoins and a slate roof. There are three storeys and five bays. In the centre is a segmental-arched carriageway with a rusticated keystone and a ring. This is flanked by modern shopfronts, and the upper floors contain sash windows, those in the fourth bay blind.	II
1 Cornforth Hill; 54.40181°N 1.73936°W		18th century	The house is in stone, with quoins, and a stone slate roof with coped gables and a shaped kneeler on the right. There are three storeys and two bays. The ground floor contains a garage door and a small window, on the middle floor are sash windows, and on the top floor is a Venetian window, the middle light blind. The entrance is in the right gable end.	II
2 Cornforth Hill; 54.40180°N 1.73946°W		18th century	The cottage is in stone with a pantile roof. There are two storeys and one bay. On the left of the ground floor is a doorway, and on each floor is a sash window with a projecting stone surround.	II
3 Cornforth Hill; 54.40181°N 1.73953°W		18th century or possibly 17th century	The cottage is in stone with a pantile roof. There are two storeys and two bays. The doorway is near the centre of the ground floor, and the windows are sashes.	II
4 and 5 Cornforth Hill; 54.40181°N 1.73968°W		18th century	A pair of cottages in stone with a Welsh slate roof. There are two storeys and each cottage has one bay. The doorways are in the centre, and have flat arches of voussoirs. On the ground floor of the right cottage is a box bay window, and the other windows are sashes in projecting stone frames.	II
6 Cornforth Hill; 54.40178°N 1.73981°W		18th century	The house is in stone with a stone slate roof. There are three storeys and one bay. The doorway on the left has a rectangular fanlight. To its right is a canted bay window with reeded pilasters, a plain frieze, and a cornice. The upper floors contain sash windows with flat rubbed brick arches.	II
7 Cornforth Hill; 54.40177°N 1.73989°W		18th century	The house is in stone, with quoins on the left, and a stone slate roof with a coped west gable and a shaped kneeler. There are three storeys and two bays. The doorway in the right bay has a shouldered architrave, a rectangular fanlight, an ornamental frieze and a cornice. To its left is a canted bay window with reeded pilasters, a plain frieze and a cornice. The upper floors contain sash windows with flat rubbed brick arches.	II
8 Cornforth Hill; 54.40162°N 1.73971°W		18th century or earlier	Two cottages combined into one house, in stone, with a pantile roof and raised and coped gables. There are two storeys and three bays. The doorway has a flat brick arch, and to its right is a small window. The other windows are horizontally sliding sashes, the middle window on the ground floor with a stone lintel and a keystone under a residual brick arch, and the others with flat brick arches.	II
1–5 Finkle Street; 54.40352°N 1.73878°W		18th century	A row of three rendered shops with roofs of Welsh slate and stone slate, and three storeys. On the ground floor are shopfronts of differing ages. The upper floors contain windows, some of which are sashes and others are modern.	II
14 Finkle Street; 54.40374°N 1.73899°W		18th century	A restaurant in stone with a slate roof. There are three storeys and two bays. The ground floor contains a shopfront, on the middle floor is a canted bay window, and the top floor has sash windows in stone surrounds.	II
16 and 18 Finkle Street; 54.40379°N 1.73913°W		18th century	A shop in stone with a slate roof. There are three storeys and five bays. The ground floor contains shopfronts, and on the upper floors are sash windows.	II
5 Market Place; 54.40339°N 1.73677°W		Mid-18th century	The shop is in painted stone with a Welsh slate roof. There are three storeys and two bays. The ground floor contains a modern shopfront, on the middle floor is a three-light window, and the top floor has two sash windows.	II
7 and 8 Market Place; 54.40343°N 1.73691°W		Mid-18th century	A pair of shops, roughcast on brick, with rusticated quoins, a moulded eaves cornice, and a slate roof. There are three storeys and four bays. On the ground floor are two modern shopfronts flanking a doorway in a plain surround. The upper floors contain sash windows.	II
10 Market Place and 1 King Street; 54.40356°N 1.73758°W		Mid-18th century	A shop, a stump of the former King's Arms Inn, in painted brick, with rusticated quoins, and a stone capped parapet. There are three storeys and one bay. The ground floor contains a modern shopfront, above it is a slightly canted bay window, and on the top floor is a sash window with a moulded surround. On the right return is a tall round-headed stair window and a doorway with pilasters.	II
11 and 12 Market Place; 54.40354°N 1.73769°W		18th century	The shop is in stone, with a moulded eaves cornice, and a stone slate roof with kneelers. There are three storeys and four bays. On the ground floor is a modern shopfront, and the upper floors contain casement windows.	II
15 and 16 Market Place; 54.40352°N 1.73808°W		Mid-18th century	The shop is in red brick, with quoins on the right, a parapet with stone capping, and a slate roof. There are three storeys and four bays. The ground floor contains modern shopfronts, and above are sash windows with moulded stone frames.	II
17 and 18 Market Place; 54.40348°N 1.73824°W		Mid-18th century	Two shops in red brick, with an eaves cornice, moulded guttering, and a stone slate roof. There are three storeys and five bays. On the ground floor are two shopfronts, and to the right is an inscribed stone archway with a moulded four-centred arched head. The upper floors contain sash windows.	II
22 Market Place; 54.40330°N 1.73849°W		18th century	A shop in stone with a sill band, a small moulded eaves cornice, a parapet and a Welsh slate roof. There are three storeys and three bays. On the ground floor is a modern shopfront, and the upper floors contain sash windows in shouldered stone frames.	II
24 Market Place; 54.40310°N 1.73858°W		Mid-18th century	The shop is rendered, and has rusticated quoins, and a small parapet. There are three storeys and four bays. The ground floor contains a modern shopfront, and on the upper floors are sash windows with moulded wooden frames.	II
25 and 26 Market Place; 54.40302°N 1.73859°W		Mid-18th century	A pair of shops in red brick, with rusticated quoins. There are three storeys and four bays. On the ground floor are modern shopfronts, and the upper floors contain sash windows in moulded wooden frames.	II
27 Market Place; 54.40299°N 1.73860°W		Mid-18th century	Two rendered shops with rusticated quoins and a Welsh slate roof. There are three storeys and four bays. On the ground floor is a 19th-century shopfront with grooved pilasters, and on the upper floors are sash windows in moulded wooden frames.	II
28 Market Place; 54.40291°N 1.73862°W		18th century	The shop is in painted brick, with rusticated quoins, a moulded cornice, a low parapet and a stone slate roof. There are three storeys and three bays, The ground floor contains a modern shopfront and a doorway with a rectangular fanlight to the right. On the upper floors are sash windows with moulded stone surrounds, the centre window on the middle floor with a pediment, and the sills on the top floor on brackets.	II
30 Market Place; 54.40279°N 1.73859°W		18th century	The building was later refaced, it is in red brick, the ground floor is stuccoed, and it has rusticated quoins, a dentilled floor band, a dentilled eaves cornice, and a hipped Welsh slate roof. There are three storeys and five bays. The ground floor contains a modern shopfront, and to the right is a doorway with a moulded surround, a frieze containing an oval window, and a pediment. On the upper floors are sash windows with segmental brick arches.	II
37 and 38 Market Place; 54.40258°N 1.73824°W		Mid-18th century	The building is in red brick, with rusticated quoins, a moulded eaves cornice with paired modillions, and a parapet. There are three storeys and four bays. The ground floor contains modern shopfronts, and on the upper floors are sash windows in moulded frames, the sills on brackets.	II
40 and 41 Market Place; 54.40265°N 1.73795°W		18th century	The shop is in painted brick with a stone slate roof. There are three storeys and two bays. On the ground floor is a moderan shopfront, and a doorway with a rectangular fanlight to the left, and the upper floors contain sash windows.	II
53 Market Place; 54.40278°N 1.73654°W		18th century	The shop is in red brick with a parapet and a pantile roof. There are three storeys and two bays. On the ground floor is a 19th-century shopfront and a central doorway with a stone surround. The upper floors contain sash windows in moulded frames, with rusticated keystones.	II
55 Market Place; 54.40274°N 1.73638°W		18th century	A house, later a bank, on a corner site, in red brick with rusticated stone quoins, a stone eaves cornice, and a Welsh slate roof, hipped on the left. There are three storeys, and on the Market Place front are five bays. The ground floor contains a projecting stone bank front, and the windows are sashes in moulded stone frames. On the Millgate front are three bays, and a lower extension with two bays. On the front is a doorway with a moulded surround, shaped jambs, a pulvinated frieze with a central panel, and a moulded cornice, and to its left is a small bay window. Further to the left is a wall containing a rusticated round-headed carriage entry with a keystone.	II
56 Market Place; 54.40283°N 1.73610°W		Mid-18th century	The building is rendered over red brick, on a plinth, with rusticated stone quoins, a sill band and a Welsh slate roof. There are three storeys and two bays. The doorway has grooved pilasters, a moulded entablature and a rectangular fanlight, and the upper floors contain sash windows.	II
57 Market Place; 54.40289°N 1.73606°W		Mid-18th century	The shop is in painted stucco, and has a moulded modillion cornice and a Welsh slate roof. There are three storeys and three bays. The doorway has a moulded surround, shaped jambs, a pulvinated frieze and a dentilled cornice. To its left is a shallow bay window, to the right is a shop window, and the upper floors contain sash windows with stone frames and rusticated keystones.	II
58 and 59 Market Place; 54.40299°N 1.73596°W		Mid-18th century	The building is in painted roughcast, with rusticated quoins, a moulded cornice with modillions, a parapet, and a roof partly of slate and partly of pantile. There are three storeys and eight bays. Part of the ground floor is recessed, and to the left is a doorway with engaged Tuscan columns, a three-light fanlight, a triglyph frieze, and a moulded pediment. Also on this floor are two shop windows, and in the right bay is a segmental-headed carriage archway with shaped jambs and a rusticated keystone. The upper floors contain sash windows with rusticated keystones.	II*
1 Millgate; 54.40274°N 1.73608°W		Mid-18th century	A house, later an office, in stone with a stone slate roof. There are three storeys and two bays. The doorway on the left has pilasters, a segmental traceried fanlight and an open pediment. The windows are sashes.	II
3 Millgate; 54.40271°N 1.73609°W		Mid-18th century	The house is in painted roughcast on a plinth with a band, with rusticated quoins, a moulded eaves cornice and a Welsh slate roof. There are three storeys and three bays. On the right bay is a doorway and a shuttered entrance with an entablature on consoles, and on the extreme left is a doorway with a rectangular fanlight. The windows are sashes in moulded frames.	II
5 Millgate; 54.40261°N 1.73613°W		Mid-18th century	The house is in painted stone with a stone slate roof. There are three storeys and three bays. On the centre is a doorway with a moulded surround and an entablature. The outer bays contain three-storey canted bay windows.	II
15 Millgate; 54.40229°N 1.73628°W		18th century	The house is rendered, on a plinth, and has a pantile roof. There are two storeys and one bay. The doorway is on the right, and there is one window in each floor.	II
17 Millgate; 54.40225°N 1.73631°W		18th century	The house is rendered and has a Welsh slate roof. There are two storeys and two bays. The doorway is in the right bay, to its left is a two-light mullioned window, above it is a sash window, and in the left bay is a small window in each floor.	II
5 Newbiggin; 54.40364°N 1.73962°W		18th century	The house is in stone with a slate roof. There are two storeys, a basement and two bays. The doorway on the left has a divided fanlight, the windows are sashes, and there is a basement opening.	II
6 Newbiggin; 54.40381°N 1.73999°W		18th century	The house is rendered on brick, and has three storeys and one bay. The doorway on the right has a moulded surround, and on each floor is a sash window.	II
8 Newbiggin; 54.40381°N 1.74009°W		Mid-18th century	A shop in red and white brick, with chamfered rusticated quoins, a moulded eaves cornice, and a pantile roof. There are three storeys and three bays. In the centre, steps lead up to a doorway with shaped jambs, a rectangular fanlight, and a small cornice on brackets, to its left is a shop window, and to the right is a canted shop window with a rendered base. On the upper floors are sash windows.	II
12 Newbiggin; 54.40385°N 1.74035°W		Mid-18th century	The house is in rendered stone on a rendered plinth, with a sill band, a moulded modillion cornice and a small parapet. There are three storeys and four bays. The doorway has a shouldered surround, a divided fanlight and a small modillion cornice, and the windows are sashes in moulded frames.	II
18 Newbiggin; 54.40386°N 1.74087°W		18th century	The house is in red brick, rendered on the side, with stone dressings, chamfered rusticated quoins, a dentilled and chevron cornice, and a stone slate roof with kneelers. There are three storeys and three bays. The doorway in the left bay has a moulded surround, a rectangular fanlight, a pulvinated frieze and a small cornice, and adjacent is an iron boot scraper. The windows are sashes, those on the lower two floors in moulded surrounds.	II
25 Newbiggin; 54.40369°N 1.74079°W		18th century (possible)	The house is rendered and has a Welsh slate roof. There are two storeys and three bays. In the centre is a doorway, and there is a passage door on the right, both with a rectangular fanlight, and the windows are sashes.	II
26 Newbiggin; 54.40384°N 1.74142°W		18th century	The house is in stone on a small plinth, with a sill band, a cornice band, a parapet and a stone slate roof. There are two storeys and four bays. The doorway has a moulded surround, a four-light fanlight, and a cornice on moulded brackets. The windows are sashes in moulded frames.	II
28 Newbiggin; 54.40384°N 1.74161°W		Mid-18th century	The house is in stone on a plinth, with a sill band and a stone slate roof. There are three storeys and three bays. The doorway in the left bay has a moulded surround, shaped jambs, a rectangular fanlight, and a small cornice. The windows are sashes in stone surrounds with keystones, those on the ground floor with shaped jambs.	II
30 and 30A Newbiggin; 54.40384°N 1.74179°W		Mid-18th century	The house is in stone on a plinth, with a rendered stall riser, rusticated quoins, sill bands, a moulded cornice, and a stone slate roof. There are three storeys and three bays. The central doorway and the ground floor windows have Gibbs surrounds with keystones. The doorway has a three-pane rectangular fanlight, and the windows are sashes, those on the upper two floors with moulded surrounds.	II
31 Newbiggin; 54.40361°N 1.74113°W		Mid-18th century	The house is in stone with quoins and a Welsh slate roof. There are three storeys and three bays. On the front is a doorway, and to the right is a yard entrance. The windows are a mix of sashes and casements.	II
36 Newbiggin; 54.40388°N 1.74255°W		18th century	The cottage is in stone with a slate roof. There are two storeys and two bays. The doorway is in the right bay, and the windows are modern casements.	II
39 Newbiggin; 54.40360°N 1.74161°W		18th century	The house is in stone with a pantile roof. There are two storeys and two bays. The doorway is in the centre, and the windows are modern casements.	II
41A Newbiggin; 54.40353°N 1.74174°W	—	18th century	The house is in stone, with two storeys and two bays. Thee are two doorways, one with a pedimented hood on brackets, two blocked windows, and a long stair window, all with architraves and keystones.	II
43 and 45 Newbiggin; 54.40362°N 1.74189°W		18th century	A pair of cottages in rendered stone, with a roof of Welsh slate to the left house and stone slate to the right house. There are two storeys and four bays. Each cottage has a plain doorway, and the windows are horizontally sliding sashes.	II
47 Newbiggin; 54.40358°N 1.74209°W		18th century	The house is in stone, with chamfered quoins, a moulded eaves cornice, and a pantile roof. There are two storeys and five bays, the outer bays slightly recessed, and the central bay projecting under a pediment. The central doorway has a moulded surround with nail head ornament, and above it is a round-headed window with Gothic glazing and a hood mould. Flanking the doorway are canted bay windows with Gothic glazing, clustered column mullions, and shaped roofs, and above them are windows with a pointed head and a hood mould. The windows in the outer bays are flat-headed sashess, and in the right bay is a plain doorway.	II*
49 Newbiggin; 54.40360°N 1.74222°W		18th century	The cottage is in stone and has a slate roof. There are two storeys and one bay. On the left is a gabled porch, and the windows are modern, each with a cement lintel.	II
51 Newbiggin; 54.40361°N 1.74232°W		18th century	The house is in stone with a hipped slate roof. There are two storeys, a basement and two bays. The doorway is in the left bay, the windows are sashes, and all the openings have moulded architraves and keystones. In the basement are a door and a window.	II
13 New Road; 54.40217°N 1.73906°W		18th century	The house is rendered and has a slate roof. There are two storeys and two bays. The central doorway has a wooden architrave, and a hood on carved consoles. To its right is a slightly canted bay window, and the other windows are sashes.	II
1 and 2A The Bar and 1 and 2A Castle Hill; 54.40215°N 1.73875°W	—	18th century	The house is roughcast, it has three storeys and a modern recessed top storey, and one bay. Each floor contains a window, that on the ground floor with a moulded frame, and the door also has a moulded frame.	II
6 The Bar; 54.40198°N 1.73920°W		18th century	The house is in stone with a stone slate roof. There are two storeys at the front and three at the rear, two bays, and a two-storey single-bay extension to the north. The doorway is in the centre, and the windows are sashes.	II
8 The Bar; 54.40184°N 1.73914°W		18th century	The house is in stone and is built against the Town Wall. There are two storeys and one bay. On the front is a plain doorway, and a sash window on each floor.	II
12 The Bar; 54.40156°N 1.73922°W		18th century	The house is rendered and has a catslide roof. There are two storeys and two bays. The house has a canted bay window, and the other windows are modern in stone surrounds.	II
2 The Green; 54.40123°N 1.74054°W		Mid-18th century	The cottage is in colourwashed roughcast and has a stone slate roof. There are two storeys and two bays. In the centre is a gabled stone porch with a recessed doorway, and the windows are modern casements.	II
4 The Green; 54.40124°N 1.74064°W		18th century	The house is in colourwashed stone, and has a roof partly of Welsh slate and partly of stone slate. There are two storeys and two bays. The doorway on the right has the remains of a moulded stone architrave, and the windows are modern.	II
8 The Green; 54.40131°N 1.74070°W		18th century	The cottage is in colourwashed brick, with a floor band and a Welsh slate roof. There are two storeys and two bays. The doorway is on the left, and the windows are sashes, the left window on the ground floor in an arched recess.	II
14 The Green; 54.40135°N 1.74095°W		18th century	The cottage is in colourwashed brick, with a chevron eaves cornice and a pantile roof. There are two storeys and two bays. The doorway is in the right bay, to its left is a canted bay window, and the upper floor contains sash windows.	II
15 and 17 The Green; 54.40090°N 1.74133°W		18th century	A pair of houses in stone that have a stone slate roof with stone coped gables and kneelers. There are three storeys and three bays. On the ground floor are two doorways with rectangular fanlights, and to the left is a passage doorway. The windows are sashes with rusticated keystones.	II
2 and 3 Trinity Church Square; 54.40312°N 1.73708°W		Mid-18th century	Two shops, with a restaurant above, the building is rendered, with rusticated quoins, sill bands, a moulded stone eaves cornice, and an asbestos roof. There are three storeys and four bays. On the ground floor are two modern shopfronts and a doorway on the left, and the upper floors contain sash windows.	II
4 Trinity Church Square; 54.40317°N 1.73718°W		Mid-18th century	A stuccoed shop with rusticated quoins on the left, floor bands and a Welsh slate roof. There are three storeys and a basement, and one bay. Steps with iron handrails lead up to a shopfront, including a doorway with a fanlight, on the ground floor. The middle floor contains a canted oriel window, and on the top floor is a sash window.	II
5 Trinity Church Square; 54.40318°N 1.73727°W		Mid-18th century	A house later used for other purposes, it is in red brick with sill bands and a Welsh slate roof. There are three storeys and four bays. The ground floor contains a modern shopfront, and on the upper floors are sash windows.	II
20 Trinity Church Square; 54.40301°N 1.73717°W		18th century	A pair of rendered shops with a Welsh slate roof. There are two storeys and two bays. In the outer parts are doorways in moulded architraves, the right doorway approached by steps. Between the doorways, and on the upper floor, are sash windows.	II
8 and 8A Tower Street; 54.40237°N 1.73695°W		18th century	A pair of rendered houses with a slate roof. There are two storeys and three bays. On the front are two doorways, each with a rectangular fanlight, and the windows are sashes in splayed reveals.	II
1 Waterloo Street; 54.40207°N 1.73937°W		18th century	The cottage is in stone, the main part has a pantile roof, the outshut has a roof of stone slate, and the roof has gables with raised verges and tumbled-in brickwork. There are two storeys and a continuous rear outshut. The doorway and windows have flat brick arches.	II
Bishop Blaize; 54.40262°N 1.73808°W		Mid-18th century	The public house is in painted brick on a rendered plinth, and has a stone slate roof. There are three storeys and four bays. The doorway has a stone surround, and a cornice on moulded brackets, to its left is a paired square window, and to the right is a single square window. The upper floors contain sash windows with stone surrounds.	II
Black Lion Public House; 54.40371°N 1.73889°W		18th century	The public house is in colourwashed roughcast with a slate roof. There are four storeys and three bays. The central doorway has engaged Tuscan columns, a plain frieze and a cornice. The ground floor windows are tripartite, on the middle two floors are sash windows with keystones, and the top floor has casement windows with keystones.	II
Buck Inn; 54.40361°N 1.74080°W		Mid-18th century	The public house is in stone, with chamfered quoins, and a Welsh slate roof with stone gable ends. There are three storeys and four bays. The left bay has a round-arched doorway with a rusticated architrave and a semicircular fanlight. The third bay contains a round-headed doorway with an architrave, and a semicircular fanlight with a keystone. To its right is a bow window, and the other windows are sashes.	II
Linton House; 54.40307°N 1.74054°W		Mid-18th century	The house is in stone, with rusticated quoins, two storeys and three bays. The central doorway has a plain architrave on plinths, and a traceried fanlight, and on the right is a side door with a rusticated architrave. The windows are sashes, and in front of the house is a small terrace with railings.	II
Former Oak Tree Public House; 54.40164°N 1.74017°W		18th century	The building is roughcast and has a Welsh slate roof. There are two storeys and three bays. The doorway is recessed, and has a segmental head and a small open pediment. The windows are horizontally sliding sashes.	II
Wall incorporating a water supply point and a lamp standard 54.40168°N 1.73998°W		18th century	The wall is in limestone, it is coped, and contains a pilaster. On the pilaster is a wrought iron lamp standard with decorative scrolled ironwork.	II
Town Hall and Town Hall Hotel; 54.40278°N 1.73750°W		1756	The building is rendered, and has quoins, a floor band, a moulded eaves cornice and a stone slate roof. There are two storeys, and a central protruding stone porch flanked by three bays on each side. The porch has five sides, and contains a round-arched entrance flanked by pilasters, with a semicircular fanlight, and round-headed windows on the sides. The right three bays contain a rusticated archway with a keystone. The public house, in the left three bays, has a doorway with engaged Tuscan columns and an entablature, and to the left are square public house windows. The upper floors in all bays contain sash windows with stone surrounds and triple keystones. On the east front of the public house is a Venetian window.	II
The Cross; 54.40317°N 1.73808°W		1771	This consists of a stone tapering obelisk with an octagonal plan. It stands on a plinth with alternating rectangular and round-headed niches, the latter with small pediments on brackets. Above it is a fluted frieze and a moulded cornice, and the obelisk is surmounted by a granite ball finial.	II*
4–8 Castle Hill; 54.40203°N 1.73875°W		Late 18th century	A row of three roughcast and rendered cottages, with a pantile roof and two storeys. The right cottage has a doorway with a reeded surround, and the other doorways have an architrave and a cornice. The left cottage has a bow window, and the other windows are sashes.	II
13 and 14 Market Place; 54.40354°N 1.73789°W		Late 18th century	Two shops in stone with sill bands, an eaves band, a blocking course, wood guttering and a slate roof. There are three floors and four bays. The ground floor contains modern shopfronts, and on the upper floors are sash windows.	II
31 and 32 Market Place; 54.40262°N 1.73855°W		Late 18th century	The building is in painted brick with sill bands and a stone slate roof. There are three storeys and five bays, the middle three bays canted. The ground floor contains shopfronts, and to the left is a round arch with brickwork. On the upper floors, the middle three bays have sash windows, and on the outer bays are blind circular windows.	II
34 and 35 Market Place; 54.40247°N 1.73854°W		Late 18th century	A pair of shops on a corner site, in red brick, with rusticated quoins on the left, and a roof of stone slate and pantile, hipped on the left. There are three storeys and three bays. The ground floor contains 19th-century shopfronts, and on the upper floors are sash windows with gauged brick arches.	II
52 Market Place; 54.40279°N 1.73665°W		Late 18th century	The shop is in stone with a stone slate roof. There are three storeys and three bays. The ground floor contains a central doorway, a 19th-century rectangular shop bay window on the left and a modern shopfront on the right. On the right bay of the middle floor is a canted oriel window, and the other windows are sashes with flat brick arches.	II
7 Millgate; 54.40252°N 1.73619°W		Late 18th century	The house is in colourwashed brick on a stone plinth, with a stone slate roof. There are three storeys and three bays. The central doorway has engaged Tuscan columns, a rectangular fanlight, a frieze and a cornice. To its right is a shuttered yard entry, and on the extreme left is a doorway with a plain surround and a fanlight. The windows are sashes.	II
3 Newbiggin; 54.40371°N 1.73956°W		Late 18th century	The house is in stone with a stone slate roof. There are two storeys, basements and three bays. The central doorway has a stone surround, it is flanked by bow windows with reeded frames, and the upper floor contains sash windows with stone lintels.	II
7 Newbiggin; 54.40360°N 1.73967°W		Late 18th century	A stable with a loft and accommodation above, it is in stone, and the roof has French tiles at the front and stone slate at the rear. There are two storeys and two bays. The left bay contains a round-arched cart entry with voussoirs consisting of two rows of white brick, and an initialled and dated keystone. To the right is a small window, above which is a loading door with a segmental arch in white brick. To its left is a hinged iron hoist, and above the doorway is a window. At the rear is an extension and external stairs.	II
9 Newbiggin; 54.40353°N 1.73971°W		Late 18th century (probable)	The house is in stone with brick projections and a stone flagged roof. There are two storeys and an attic, and two bays, the right bay hidden behind an adjacent building. The left bay contains a doorway, over which are sash windows, the upper one in a half-dormer.	II
10 Newbiggin; 54.40382°N 1.74024°W		Late 18th century	The building is in stone, with chamfered rusticated quoins and a Welsh slate roof. There are three storeys and three bays. The ground floor contains a modern shopfront, and to its left is a doorway with a rectangular fanlight and a cornice, above which is a canted oriel window. The other windows are sashes with stuccoed wedge lintels.	II
11 and 13 Newbiggin; 54.40354°N 1.73985°W		Late 18th century	A pair of houses in stone with a Welsh slate roof. There are two storeys, a basement on the right, and three bays. Steps with handrails lead up to the doorway in the left house, with engaged columns, a frieze with swag ornament, a semicircular decorated fanlight, and a moulded pediment, and to its left is a small plain doorway. Steps lead up to the right doorway, with fluted engaged columns, a divided fanlight, and a small pediment, and flanking it are small basement openings. The windows in both houses are sashes.	II
17 Newbiggin; 54.40351°N 1.74009°W		Late 18th century	The house is rendered, on a shaped plinth, and has a slate roof. There are three storeys and one bay. The doorway on the left has engaged columns, a rectangular fanlight, a frieze and a small cornice. On the ground floor is a bow window, and the upper floors contain sash windows.	II
24 Newbiggin; 54.40390°N 1.74124°W		Late 18th century	The house is in stone, with chamfered rusticated quoins and a stone slate roof. There are three storeys and three bays. The doorway in the left bay has a rectangular fanlight, a coved frieze and a cornice, and the windows are sashes.	II
35 and 37 Newbiggin; 54.40361°N 1.74151°W		Late 18th century	Two houses in stone with quoins. The left house has a stone slate roof with kneelers, floor bands, three storeys and two bays. In the right bay is a segmental-arched carriage entry with a rusticated surround, and the windows are sashes. The right house has two storeys and one bay, a plinth, and two doorways with architraves and keystones, the left with a rectangular fanlight. On each floor is a three-light sash window.	II
3 and 4 The Bar; 54.40210°N 1.73896°W		Late 18th century	The house is in stone on a shaped stone plinth, with a stone slate roof. There are two storeys and one bay. The windows are sashes in rendered surrounds, and there are two doorways.	II
31 Castle Hill; 54.40176°N 1.73872°W		1781	The house is in stone, with two storeys and two bays. The central doorway and the three-light windows are modern.	II
The Green Bridge; 54.40046°N 1.74034°W		1789	The bridge, which carries a road over the River Swale, was designed by John Carr. It is in stone, and consists of three moulded segmental arches with round cutwaters. The bridge has a plain stone parapet and capping.	II*
3–7 Bargate; 54.40186°N 1.74029°W		Late 18th or early 19th century	A group of three cottages, two facing the street, and one at the rear. They are roughcast and have a tile roof. There are two storeys and a front of two bays. The doorways are in the centre, they are flanked by small canted bay windows, and on the upper floor are modern casement windows.	II
47 and 51 Bargate; 54.40335°N 1.74053°W		Late 18th to early 19th century	A range of cottages in roughcast stone that have a stone slate roof with kneelers. There are two storeys and three bays. On the front are two doorways. To the left of the right doorway are modern oriel windows, one in each floor. The left doorway is flanked by canted oriel windows, and the other windows are casements.	II
5 Castle Terrace; 54.40177°N 1.73584°W		Late 18th to early 19th century	The house is in stone on a rendered plinth, and has a Welsh slate roof, hipped on the left. There are two storeys and two bays. On the ground floor are two rectangular bay windows, each with stall risers, pilasters and a cornice on modillions. The upper floor contains sash windows, and the doorway has an architrave.	II
6–10 Finkle Street; 54.40360°N 1.73870°W		Late 18th or early 19th century	A row of three shops on a stone plinth, with a stone slate roof. There are two storeys and seven bays. The ground floor contains shopfronts of various types and dates, and a yard door. On the upper floor are windows, some of which are sashes and others are modern.	II
2 Millgate; 54.40243°N 1.73640°W		Late 18th to early 19th century	The house is in stone with a pantile roof. There are two storeys and two bays. To the left of the central doorway is a bow window, and the other windows are sashes.	II
4 and 6 Millgate; 54.40236°N 1.73644°W		Late 18th to early 19th century	Two houses in stone with a stone slate roof and three storeys. The right house has one bay, a doorway on the left, a sash window in each floor, and a small window on the top floor. The left house has two bays, on the ground floor is a shopfront with panelled pilasters and a fascia, and the upper floors contain sash windows.	II
8 Millgate; 54.40223°N 1.73650°W		Late 18th or early 19th century	The house is in stone with three storeys and three bays. On the front facing Millgate are two round arches containing doors, and above are sash windows. The doorway is in the right return on the middle floor, approached by a slope.	II
11 Millgate; 54.40241°N 1.73595°W		18th or early 19th century	The house is in plastered stone and has an irregular plan. There are two storeys, two bays, and a wing to the right. Steps lead up to the doorway, and the windows consist of a sash, a casement, and a modern window.	II
2 New Road; 54.40240°N 1.73861°W		18th or early 19th century	The house is rendered, on a plinth, and has a Welsh slate roof. There are three storeys and one bay. Steps lead up to a doorway on the right, with a stone surround, a panelled frieze and a small cornice. To its left is a shop window, and the upper floors contain sash windows.	II
15 New Road; 54.40214°N 1.73915°W		18th or early 19th century	The house is rendered, and has three storeys and two bays. The doorway is on the left, and the windows are sashes.	II
10 and 12 The Green; 54.40133°N 1.74082°W		Late 18th or early 19th century	The house is in stone with a pantile roof. There are three storeys and two bays. The doorway is in the centre, there is one casement window, and the other windows are sashes.	II
13 Tower Street; 54.40213°N 1.73662°W		18th or early 19th century	The house is in stone, and has three storeys. It contains a plain doorway and sash windows in stone surrounds.	II
15 Tower Street; 54.40209°N 1.73654°W		18th or early 19th century	The house is in painted brick, and has two storeys and one bay. It contains a carriage entry, a doorway and a horizontally sliding sash window.	II
23 Tower Street; 54.40179°N 1.73655°W	—	18th or early 19th century (probable)	The house is in stone with a slate roof. It contains a doorway and a two-light casement window.	II
3 and 5 Waterloo Street; 54.40226°N 1.73945°W		Late 18th to early 19th century	A pair of cottages in stone with a stone slate roof and two storeys. The right cottage has two bays, a central doorway with pilasters and a small hood on corbels, and large modern multi-pane windows, those on the ground floor flat arches of stone voussoirs. The left cottage has one bay, a doorway to the right, a sash window to the left, and a horizontally sliding sash window on the upper floor. All the openings have flat arches with stone voussoirs.	II
9 Castle Hill; 54.40216°N 1.73836°W		1809	A house, later used for other purposes, in brick on a plinth, with an eaves cornice and an ornamental iron gutter. There are three storeys and four bays. On the ground floor are two bow windows with a plain frieze and a cornice, and a doorway with a plain surround. The other windows are sashes.	II
Former Yorkshire Bank; 54.40322°N 1.73632°W	—	1819	The building is rendered, and has a Welsh slate roof. There are three storeys and three bays. On the ground floor is a pair of shop windows with stone surrounds under a cornice on brackets. To the right is a doorway with a stone surround and a decorated fanlight with a segmental head. Further to the right is a square window, and the windows above and on the upper floors are sashes.	II
Pinkney's Hospital; 54.40223°N 1.73689°W		1825	The former hospital is in stone, with two storeys and three bays. Above the central doorway is an inscribed plaque, and the outer bays contain sash windows.	II
8 Bargate; 54.40225°N 1.74006°W		Early 19th century	The house is in stone and has a stone slate roof, hipped on the right. There are two storeys and two bays. Steps lead up to the doorway, and the windows are casements, those in the left bay with three lights.	II
9 Bargate; 54.40192°N 1.74033°W		Early 19th century	The house is in stone, and has a roof with kneelers, There are three storeys and two bays. The doorway on the left has pilasters, a rectangular fanlight and a cornice. The windows are sashes with stone surrounds.	II
10 Bargate; 54.40223°N 1.74007°W		Early 19th century	The cottage is in rendered stone and has a pantile roof. There are three storeys and one bay. The doorway on the right has a moulded surround, and there is a sash window on each floor.	II
12 Bargate; 54.40229°N 1.74010°W		Early 19th century	The cottage is in rendered stone, and has two storeys and one bay. The doorway is on the left, there is a casement window on each floor, and all the openings have stone lintels.	II
32 and 34 Bargate; 54.40288°N 1.74020°W		Early 19th century	A pair of houses in stone with a Welsh slate roof. There are two storeys and four bays. On the front are two doorways with rectangular fanlights. The windows in the left house are modern with three lights, and on the right house they are sashes.	II
36, 38, 38A and 40 Bargate; 54.40299°N 1.74021°W		Early 19th century	The building is roughcast with a slate roof. There are two storeys, a front of two bays, and a rear wing with two storeys and five bays. On the front are paired doorways with pilasters, a frieze and a cornice. The windows are modern casements of different types.	II
42 Bargate; 54.40307°N 1.74023°W		Early 19th century	The house is in stone with a Welsh slate roof. There are two storeys and three bays. The central doorway has pilasters, a rectangular fanlight and a cornice. Above it is a blind window, and the other windows are modern casements.	II
46 Bargate; 54.40315°N 1.74025°W		Early 19th century	The house is in stone with a Welsh slate roof. There are two storeys and two bays. In the left bay is a round-arched carriage entry, and the windows are sashes.	II
48–56 Bargate; 54.40334°N 1.74025°W		Early 19th century	A row of five cottages stepped up a hill. They are in stone, some have a roof of pantile, and the others have slate roofs. They all have two storeys and most have two bays. One doorway has an architrave and a rusticated keystone, and three have rectangular fanlights. The windows are a mix of sashes and casements.	II
8 Bridge Street; 54.40114°N 1.74023°W		Early 19th century	The house is rendered, and has a Welsh slate roof. There are three storeys and one wide bay. On the front is a doorway, and a passage door on the right. The windows are sashes in moulded architraves.	II
13 Bridge Street; 54.40141°N 1.74030°W		Early 19th century (probable)	The house is in stone and has a stone slate roof. There are two storeys and two bays. In the right bay is a yard entrance, the central doorway has a plain surround, and the windows are sashes with wedge lintels.	II
22, 22A and 24 Bridge Street; 54.40152°N 1.73994°W		Early 19th century	A row of the three stone houses with three storeys and three bays, and a two-storey extension under a pentice roof on the left. The three doorways have rectangular fanlights, the left with a frieze above it and the adjacent window. The windows are sashes.	II
1 Carters Yard; 54.40361°N 1.74145°W	—	Early 19th century	The building is in stone on a plinth, with rusticated quoins, floor bands, and a slate roof with kneelers. There are three storeys and two bays. In the right bay is a carriage entry with a rusticated segmental arch, and the windows are sashes.	II
15 Castle Hill; 54.40202°N 1.73839°W		Early 19th century	The house is in stone on a plinth, it is rendered on the front, and has a pantile roof. There are two storeys and one bay. It has a modern door and sash windows.	II
1 and 2 Castle Terrace; 54.40194°N 1.73640°W		Early 19th century	A pair of roughcast houses with a stone slate roof, and two storeys. The right house has two bays, and a doorway with pilasters, an architrave, and a hood on brackets. This is flanked by rectangular bay windows, the right in a blocked carriage arch, and on the upper floor are mullioned and transomed windows. The left house has one bay, a plinth, a modern door and sash windows.	II
3 Castle Terrace; 54.40188°N 1.73621°W		Early 19th century (probable)	The house is in stone with a stone slate roof. There are two storeys, and two bays. In the left bay is a doorway with a sash window to the right, and the right bay contains a segmental-headed archway. Above the doorway is a three-light casement window, and to the right is a sash window and a small window.	II
4 Castle Terrace; 54.40179°N 1.73604°W		Early 19th century (probable)	The house is roughcast and has a stone slate roof. There are two storeys and two bays. The central doorway has a cornice on modillions, and the windows are sashes.	II
1, 2 and 4 Chantry Wynd; 54.40348°N 1.73851°W		Early 19th century	Three rendered shops with three storeys, three bays and kneelers. On the ground floor is a doorway and a shop window on the left. To the right is a small canted bay window with a cornice, and further to the right is a canted bay window with curved spandrels and a cornice. The upper floors contain sash windows with chamfered surrounds.	II
11 Finkle Street; 54.40365°N 1.73909°W		Early 19th century	The shop is in stone, with rusticated quoins, and a wooden eaves cornice. On the ground floor is a late 19th century shopfront on tiled stall risers, with a doorway on the left and a passage door on the right. The upper floor contains sash windows.	II
13 and 13A Finkle Street; 54.40372°N 1.73919°W		Early 19th century	A pair of shops in stone, with two storeys and four bays. The ground floor contains shopfronts of different ages, and on the upper floor are sash windows.	II
9 Millgate; 54.40243°N 1.73625°W		Early 19th century	The house is in painted rendering on a stone plinth, with three storeys and two bays. The doorway, on the extreme left, has a moulded surround, and on the right end is a flat passage arch. Between them, and on the middle floor, are sash windows, and the windows on the top floor are blocked.	II
4 New Road; 54.40236°N 1.73875°W		Early 19th century	The house is in stone with a pantile roof. There are three storeys and one bay. The doorway is on the right, and the windows are sashes.	II
6 New Road; 54.40235°N 1.73883°W		Early 19th century	The house is in stone with a pantile roof. There are three storeys and two bays. The doorway is in the left bay, the windows are modern, those in the left bay with one light, and those in the right bay with three lights. All the openings have cement lintels.	II
8 New Road; 54.40236°N 1.73892°W		Early 19th century	The house is in stone with a pantile roof. There are three storeys and one bay. The doorway is on the left, and the windows are modern casement windows. The ground floor openings have cement lintels, and those on the upper floors have flat brick arches.	II
9 New Road; 54.40224°N 1.73886°W		Early 19th century	The house is rendered and has a Welsh slate roof. There are two storeys and two bays. The ground floor contains a doorway and two sash windows, and on the upper floor are modern casement windows.	II
10 New Road; 54.40234°N 1.73900°W		Early 19th century	The house is in stone with two storeys and two bays, and it has a curved front. On the front is a doorway and casement windows, those in the right bay tripartite, and all the openings have cement lintels.	II
11 New Road; 54.40220°N 1.73895°W		Early 19th century	The house is rendered and has a Welsh slate roof. There are two storeys and two bays. The doorway on the left has a rectangular fanlight and a cornice. The windows are sashes with moulded surrounds, and to the right of the doorway is a boot scraper.	II
10 The Bar; 54.40160°N 1.73910°W		Early 19th century (probable)	The house is in stone, and has a Welsh slate roof with a stone coped gable. There are two storeys and one bay. On the front is a porch, and the windows are sashes.	II
9 The Green; 54.40095°N 1.74093°W		Early 19th century	The house is in stone with quoins and a stone slate roof. There are two storeys and two bays. On the left bay is a doorway with a pediment and a small window to the left. To the right is a bowed oriel window and a round-arched passage entry. The upper floor contains sash windows.	II
18 and 20 The Green; 54.40138°N 1.74114°W		Early 19th century (probable)	A pair of houses with stone slate roofs, the left house slightly higher. There are two storeys and each house has two bays. The houses have central doorways with a rectangular fanlight and sash windows, and the left house has a garage door.	II
19 and 21 The Green; 54.40090°N 1.74138°W		Early 19th century	The house is in stone with a slate roof. There are two storeys and four bays. In the left bay is a flat-headed archway, the third bay contains a doorway with a three-light fanlight, and the windows are sashes.	II
22 The Green; 54.40140°N 1.74133°W		Early 19th century (probable)	The house is in stone with a Welsh slate roof. There are two storeys and two bays. The central doorway has a rectangular fanlight, and the windows are sashes.	II
24 The Green; 54.40142°N 1.74140°W		Early 19th century (probable)	The cottage is roughcast and has a Welsh slate roof. There are two storeys and one bay. The doorway on the left is under a brick arch, and the windows are sashes.	II
26 The Green; 54.40144°N 1.74150°W		Early 19th century (probable)	The house is in stone, and has two storeys and two bays. The doorway is in the centre, and the widows are modern casements with three lights.	II
29 The Green; 54.40099°N 1.74179°W		Early 19th century	The house is in stone, with two storeys and three bays. On the front is a doorway and sash windows, all with stone lintels.	II
30 The Green; 54.40087°N 1.74168°W		Early 19th century	The house is in stone with a slate roof, and its gable end faces the street. There are two storeys and two bays. The central doorway has a rectangular fanlight. Most of the windows are sashes, there is one small upper window, and to the right are two blocked openings.	II
35 The Green; 54.40110°N 1.74179°W		Early 19th century	The house is in stone, with rusticated quoins on the left, and a stone slate roof. There are two storeys and two bays. On the front are sash windows, one on the upper floor and two on the ground floor.	II
37 and 39 The Green; 54.40114°N 1.74183°W		Early 19th century	The house is in stone, with rusticated quoins on the right, and a stone slate roof. There are two storeys and three bays. The central doorway has a rectangular fanlight, and the windows are sashes.	II
19 Trinity Church Square; 54.40301°N 1.73724°W		Early 19th century	The building is rendered and has a pantile roof. There are two storeys and four bays. On the front are two doorways, one approached by steps, and the windows are sashes.	II
3 and 5 Tower Street; 54.40240°N 1.73683°W		Early 19th century	A pair of stone houses with quoins, two storeys and two bays. Each house has a doorway on the right and sash windows.	II
7 Tower Street; 54.40231°N 1.73677°W		Early 19th century	The house is in stone on a high plinth, and has two storeys and three bays. The doorway in the left bay has a stone surround, a four-pane fanlight, a plain frieze and a cornice. The windows are sashes, those on the ground floor with round-arched heads.	II
9 and 11 Tower Street; 54.40220°N 1.73671°W		Early 19th century (probable)	A pair of stone houses with two storeys and four bays. On the front are two doorways. On the right bay is a bow window, with a casement window above, and to its left is a small window. The other windows are sashes.	II
17 Tower Street; 54.40204°N 1.73651°W		Early 19th century (probable)	The house is in two parts. The right part is in stone with a hipped roof of pantile and slate. There is one storey and one bay, and it contains a window, and a doorway with a rectangular fanlight. The right part is roughcast, with two storeys and one bay, and it contains a window in each floor.	II
21 Tower Street; 54.40185°N 1.73651°W		Early 19th century	The house is in roughcast stone with a stone slate roof. There are two storeys and it contains a modern door.	II
Castle Cottage; 54.40202°N 1.73901°W		Early 19th century	The cottage is in roughcast stone on a shaped stone plinth, and has two storeys and two bays. The central doorway has a moulded surround and a rectangular fanlight, and the windows are sashes in moulded surrounds.	II
Castle Tavern; 54.40329°N 1.73651°W		Early 19th century	The public house is in painted roughcast, with rusticated quoins, a floor band, and a tile roof. There are three storeys and two bays. In the right bay is a segmental-arched entry, to its left is a tripartite window, and the upper floors contain sash windows.	II
3 Bridge Street; 54.40094°N 1.74052°W		Early to mid-19th century	The house is in stone, with two storeys and three bays. The doorway has a rectangular fanlight, there is a blocked doorway to the right, the windows on the front are sashes, one blocked, and all the openings have rusticated surrounds. On the right return is a canted oriel window over a former shop window.	II
19 and 21 Millgate; 54.40221°N 1.73634°W		Early to mid-19th century	A pair of stone houses, rendered on the right return, with a pantile roof. There are two storeys and three bays. On the front are two doorways, one in the centre and the other on the left, the windows are sashes, and all the openings have segmental arches.	II
4 Newbiggin; 54.40383°N 1.73982°W	—	Early to mid-19th century	The house is in stone with a Welsh slate roof. There are two storeys and two bays. The doorway in the right bay has pilasters and a cornice, and the windows are sashes.	II
19 and 21 Newbiggin; 54.40350°N 1.74023°W		Early to mid-19th century	A pair of stone houses with chamfered quoins and a Welsh slate roof. There are two storeys and four bays. The doorways have three-pane fanlights, and the windows are sashes. In front of the right house is a terrace with an iron handrail.	II
19 Tower Street; 54.40199°N 1.73642°W		Early to mid-19th century (probable)	The house is rendered and has one storey. It contains modern windows and a modern door.	II
14 Bargate; 54.40234°N 1.74009°W		Mid-19th century	The house is in stone with a Welsh slate roof. There are two storeys and two bays. The doorway in the left bay has a rectangular fanlight, and the windows are sashes.	II
57 Bargate; 54.40357°N 1.74051°W		Mid-19th century	The cottage is in stone with a Welsh slate roof. There are two storeys and two bays. The doorway is in the right bay, the windows are sashes, and the ground floor openings have relieving stone arches.	II
6 Bridge Street; 54.40109°N 1.74022°W		Mid-19th century	The house is in stone with a Welsh slate roof. There are two storeys and two bays. The doorway in the left bay has a segmental-arched head and a fanlight, and the windows are sashes. The window on the ground floor is under a relieving arch, and the doorway and the other windows have quoined surrounds.	II
10 Bridge Street; 54.40123°N 1.74016°W		Mid-19th century	The house is rendered and has a Welsh slate roof. There are two storeys and three bays. The doorway has pilasters, a small fanlight, and a dentilled cornice, and to its right is a garage door. The windows are sashes, those in the right two bay are tripartite.	II
17 Castle Hill; 54.40210°N 1.73852°W		Mid-19th century	A shop on a corner site in stone, with quoins, three storeys, two bays on the front, and one on the left return. On each front is a shopfront, the middle floor of the front on Castle Hill contains an oriel window, and on the left return is a doorway with a stone surround and a four-centred arched head.	II
41 Newbiggin; 54.40362°N 1.74174°W		19th century	The house is in stone on a plinth, with rusticated quoins, an eaves cornice, and a pantile roof. There are three storeys and two bays. On the ground floor are two round-headed doorways flanking a round-headed window, all with radiating semicircular fanlights. The left bay on the middle floor contains a canted oriel window, and the other windows are sashes.	II
1–7 The Green; 54.40094°N 1.74072°W		Mid-19th century	A row of seven cottages in stone with a Welsh slate roof. There are two storeys and each cottage has one bay. On the extreme left is a passage door. The other doorway and the windows, which are sashes, have quoined surrounds.	II
Bargate House; 54.40317°N 1.74059°W		Mid-19th century	The house is in red brick with bracketed eaves and a Welsh slate roof. There are two storeys and three bays. Steps lead up to the central doorway that has a moulded stone surround and a rectangular fanlight. This is flanked by canted bay windows with pilasters and a cornice, the lights with elliptical heads. The top floor contains sash windows, and on the extreme right is a smaller doorway with a stone surround.	II
Golden Lion Hotel; 54.40271°N 1.73782°W		Mid-19th century	The public house is in painted brick and has a Welsh slate roof. There are two storeys and three bays. The central doorway has a plain surround and a rectangular fanlight. The windows on the upper floor are sashes, and on the ground floor are multi-pane windows with moulded stone surrounds.	II
Market Hall; 54.40276°N 1.73704°W		1854	The market hall is in stone, with rusticated quoins and piers, and a Welsh slate roof. It has a front of three bays, each with a pediment and a dentilled cornice. Each bay contains a recessed round-headed arch with a triple keystone. The outer bays contain round-headed sash windows, and the middle bay has a doorway, over which is a large glazed fanlight.	II
Former Ebenezer Chapel; 54.40348°N 1.74066°W		1861	The chapel, later used for other purposes, is in red brick with yellow brick dressings on a plinth. There are three bays, divided and flanked by pilasters. In the centre are double doors with a traceried semicircular fanlight, above which is a stone plaque on brackets. The outer bays contain tall sash windows under round yellow brick arches with traceried fanlights. Over this is a gable with ball finials and a central urn. In front are iron railings and the remains of an overthrow, and four gate piers with pyramidal stone caps.	II
St Joseph and St Francis Xavier Church; 54.40404°N 1.74224°W		1867–68	The church, designed by George Goldie, is in stone with slate roofs. It consists of a nave with a clerestory, north and south aisles, a chancel with curved apse aisles, a west porch and a southwest tower. The tower is slender, and has a square base rising to an octagonal bell stage with narrow bell openings, on which is an octagonal spire with four lucarnes.	II
32 and 34 Newbiggin; 54.40391°N 1.74197°W		1869	A presbytery designed by George Goldie, and later used for other purposes. It is in stone with quoins, bands, and slate roofs with coped gables and kneelers. There are three storeys and a street front of four bays. The doorway has a shouldered surround and a fanlight. The windows are sashes with shouldered surrounds, and there is a square oriel window. On the west front is a gabled porch with bargeboards, two bay windows, and a datestone.	II
1 Trinity Church Square; 54.40313°N 1.73691°W		Late 19th century	A shop on a corner site, it is rendered and has a pantile roof. There is a single storey, it contains a shopfront, and the corner is curved.	II
11 and 13 The Green; 54.40092°N 1.74113°W		1880	Originally the Green Mission, later converted for residential use, it is in stone with a sill band, and is in Gothic style. There are two storeys and six bays. The left bay contains a doorway with a pointed arch, and is surmounted by a gabled bellcote. To the right are two doorways with flat arches, splayed reveals, and rectangular fanlights, and two-light mullioned windows. The upper floor contains sash windows with rusticated surrounds.	II
33 Castle Hill; 54.40169°N 1.73880°W		Undated	A cottage in stone on a plinth, with three storeys and one bay. The doorway has a plain surround, and a segmental fanlight with Gothic glazing. To its left is a bow window, and the upper floors contain sash windows.	II
2 and 3 Market Place; 54.40327°N 1.73646°W	—	Undated	The building is in two parts, with Welsh slate roofs, three storeys and two bays each. The left building is part of a public house, and is rendered, with quoins on the right, a sill band, and an eaves cornice. On the right is a segmental-headed archway. The right building is a shop in stone, with an eaves cornice, and a roof with a stone coped gables and kneelers. The ground floor contains a modern shopfront, and the windows in both parts are sashes with stone surrounds.	II
Cobble stones, Bargate; 54.40245°N 1.74024°W		Undated	The cobble stones pave the roadway of Bargate to the north of the junction with New Road.	II
Cobble stones, Cornforth Hill; 54.40170°N 1.73964°W		Undated	The cobble stones pave the roadway of Cornforth Hill.	II
Cobble stones, Market Place; 54.40332°N 1.73788°W		Undated	The cobble stones pave the roadway of the Market Place.	II
Cobble stones, Newbiggin; 54.40377°N 1.74033°W		Undated	The cobble stones pave the roadway of Newbiggin.	II
Cobble stones, The Bar; 54.40195°N 1.73897°W		Undated	The cobble stones pave the roadway of The Bar.	II
Cobble stones, Tower Street; 54.40242°N 1.73690°W		Undated	The cobble stones pave the roadway of Tower Street.	II
