= 9 Market Place =

Building in Richmond, North Yorkshire, England

Coordinates: 54°24′12″N 1°44′13″W

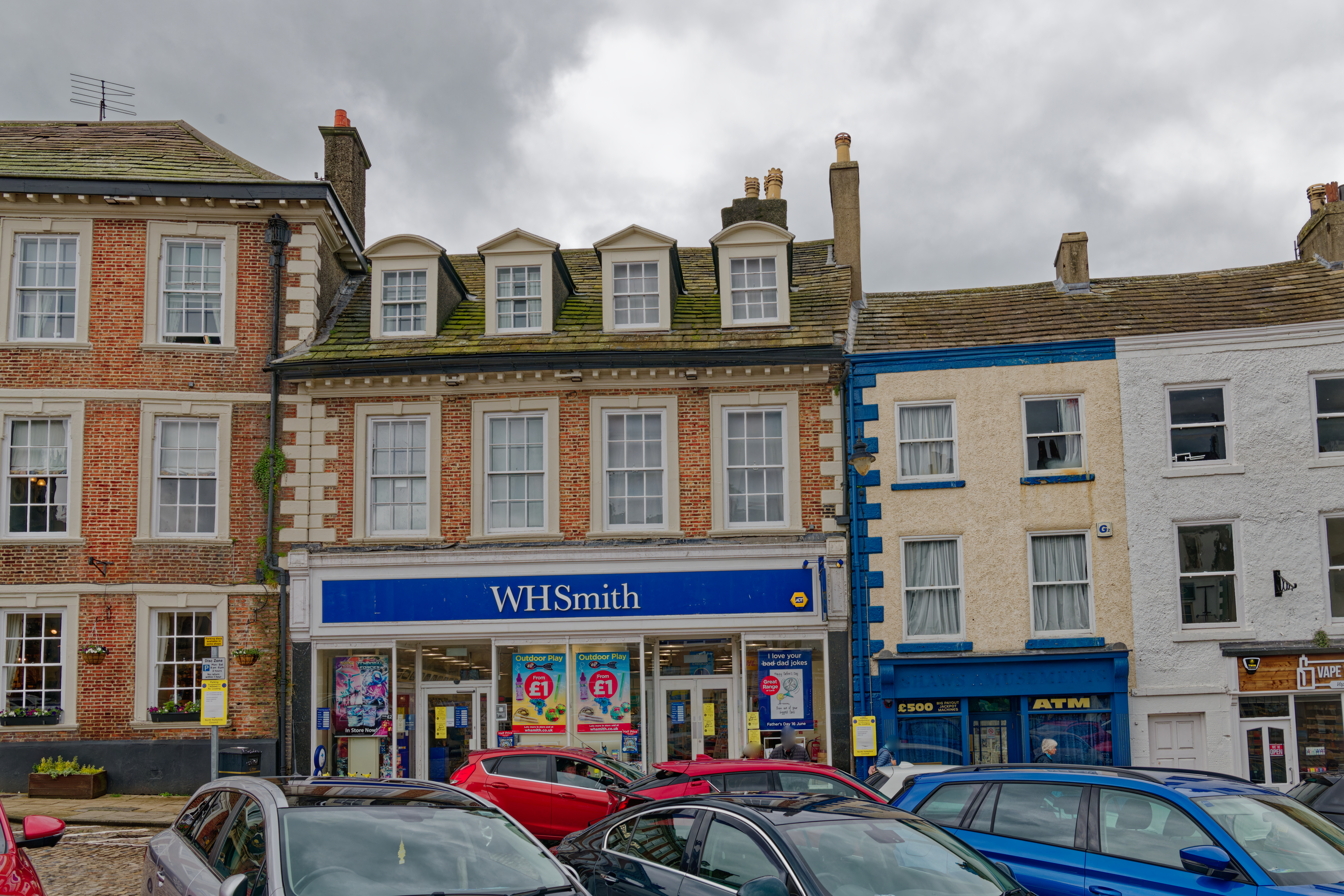
The building, in 2024

9 Market Place is a historic building in Richmond, North Yorkshire, a town in England.

The building was constructed as a house in the early 18th century. In 1936, it became a branch of Woolworths, and a shop front was inserted at ground floor level. In the 1970s, Woolworths moved to larger premises at 58 and 59 Market Place, and the shop was later occupied by WHSmith. The building was grade II* listed in 1952.

The shop is built of red brick, with rusticated quoins, a heavy cornice, and a slate roof. It has two storeys and four bays. On the ground floor is the modern shopfront, the upper floor contains sash windows with moulded surrounds and small keystones. On the roof are four dormers, the outer pair with segmental pediments, and the inner pair with triangular pediments.

== See also ==
- Grade II* listed buildings in North Yorkshire (district)
- Listed buildings in Richmond, North Yorkshire (central area)
