= Waimate Courthouse =

Former courthoue in Waimate, New Zealand

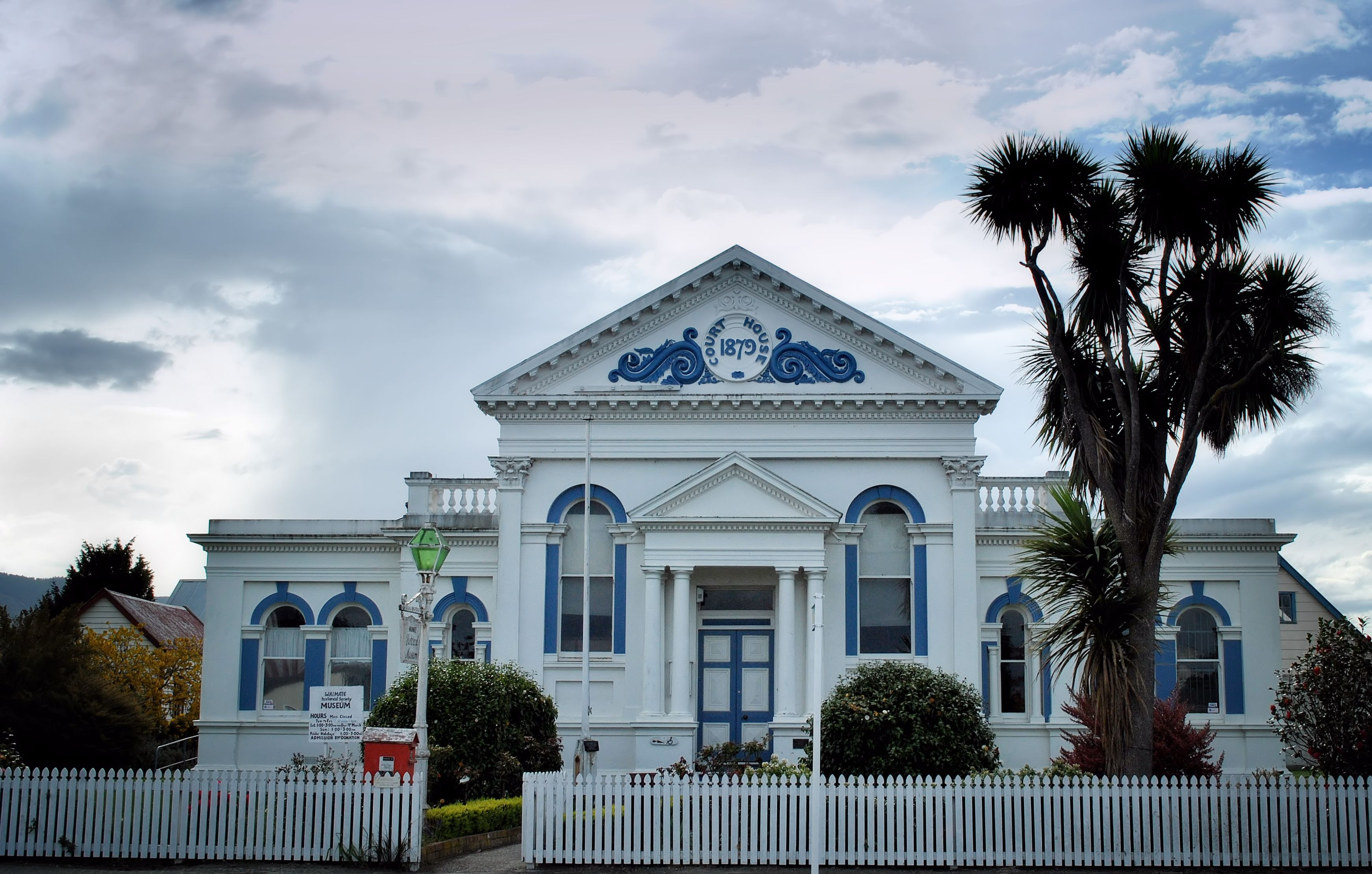
- Alternative names: Waimate Museum

General information
- Type: Courthouse
- Architectural style: Neo-classical
- Location: 28 Shearman Street, Waimate
- Coordinates: 44°43′56″S 171°02′45″E
- Current tenants: Waimate Museum Trust
- Year built: 1879
- Opened: 1880 (formally)
- Closed: October 1979

Design and construction
- Architect: Pierre Burrows
- Main contractor: H. McCormick

Website
- waimatemuseumandarchives.org.nz

Heritage New Zealand – Category 1
- Designated: 27 June 1985
- Reference no.: 321

The Waimate Courthouse is a historic neo-classical former courthouse in Waimate, New Zealand. The courthouse was built in 1879 to a design by Pierre Burrows and operated as the courthouse for Waimate for a century before becoming home to the Waimate Museum. The former courthouse is registered as a category 1 building with Heritage New Zealand.

== Description ==
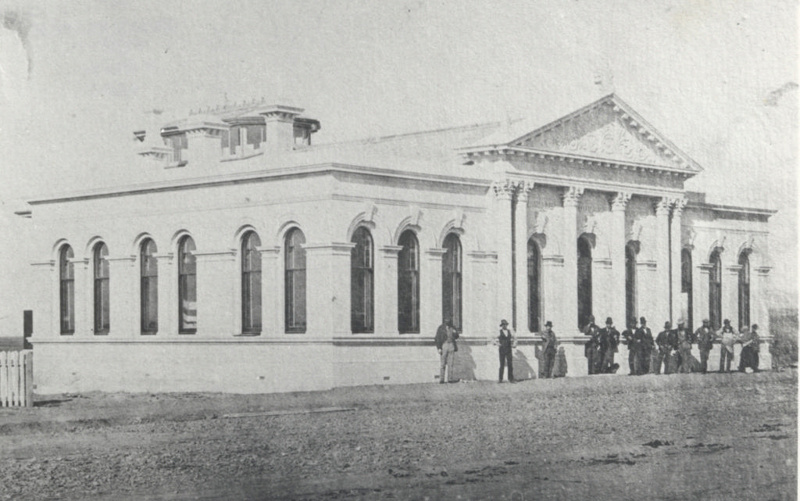
The Waimate County Council Chambers influenced Burrows in his design of the courthouse.

The courthouse is a neo-classical brick plaster building with a 1 and a half storey tall central hall and two single storey wings. The central hall is topped with an ornate pediment. A portico covers the entrance to the building. The central hall served as the courtroom with the two side wings being office space. The building's chimneys were later removed. The building's design was influenced by the Waimate County Council's chambers.

The courthouse has an associated stables and toilet block located behind the courthouse. The Waimate Museum Trust has added other historic buildings onto the site such as a former jail and a small cottage.

== History ==
=== Background ===
Waimate's first magistrate, Belfield Woollcombe, was appointed in 1865 for the town of roughly 300. The following year construction began on Waimate's first courthouse. By 1878 the quality of the first courthouse had decayed and plans were made for a new one: Pierre Burrows, head of the Colonial Architect's office, (Note: Officially only William Clayton ever held the position of Colonial Architect.) designed a neo-classical brick building.

=== Courthouse ===
The courthouse was constructed by H. McCormick in 1879 and formally opened in July 1880. After the building was completed the first person to be tried, a drunkard, was acquitted in honour of the occasion.

The courthouse was used to sell sections of Allan McLean's Waikakahi estate after the Crown acquired it in 1899 under the Public Works Act.

== Museum ==
The Department of Justice closed the courthouse in October 1979. The Waimate Museum Trust Board requested that they be allowed to move into the premises and since 1981 have operated out of the building. Following the closure of the courthouse the building was declared as a historic reserve. The historic reserve's ownership is disputed by the Waimate District Council and the Department of Conservation: the council believes that the process to vest the reserve with the council was never completed whilst the Department of Conservation point to a notice in the New Zealand Gazette that states the historic reserve was vested with the council in September 2014.

== Legacy ==
According to Conal McCarthy the Oamaru Courthouse's design was influenced by the Waimate Courthouse.

The building's Heritage New Zealand report states that the courthouse 'is significant as a beautiful building and a major feature of the townscape' and 'it is arguably one of the finest courthouses to survive in New Zealand.'

The building is registered with Heritage New Zealand as a category 1 building and scheduled with the Waimate District Council as a category A building.
