= Richmond Market Hall =

Building in Richmond, North Yorkshire, England

Coordinates: 54°24′10″N 1°44′13″W

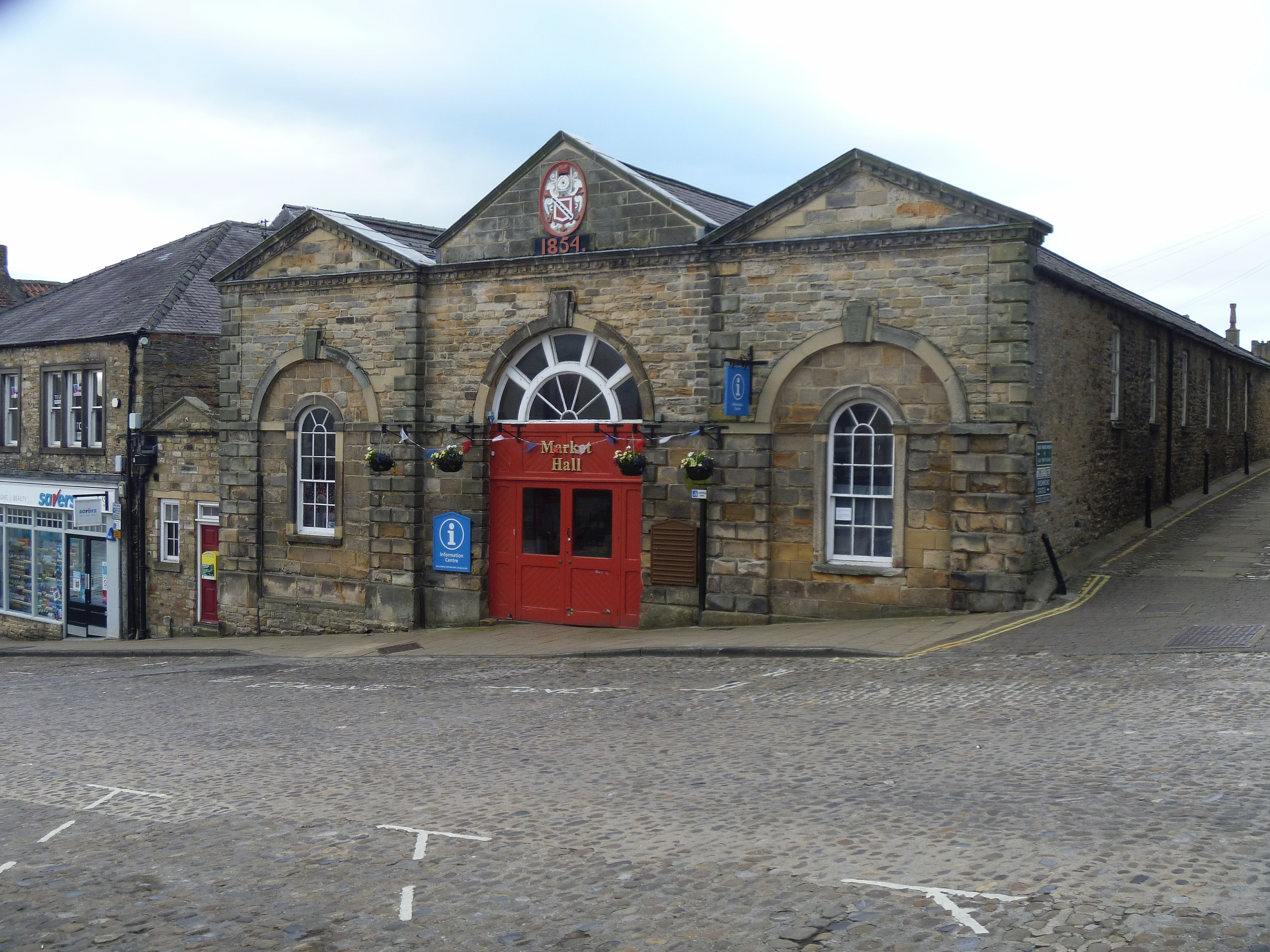
The building, in 2022

Richmond Market Hall is a historic building in Richmond, North Yorkshire, a town in England.

The market hall was built in 1854 on the town's marketplace, in an 18th-century style. The building was grade II listed in 1967. It houses a market which runs seven days a week, and the town's tourist information centre.

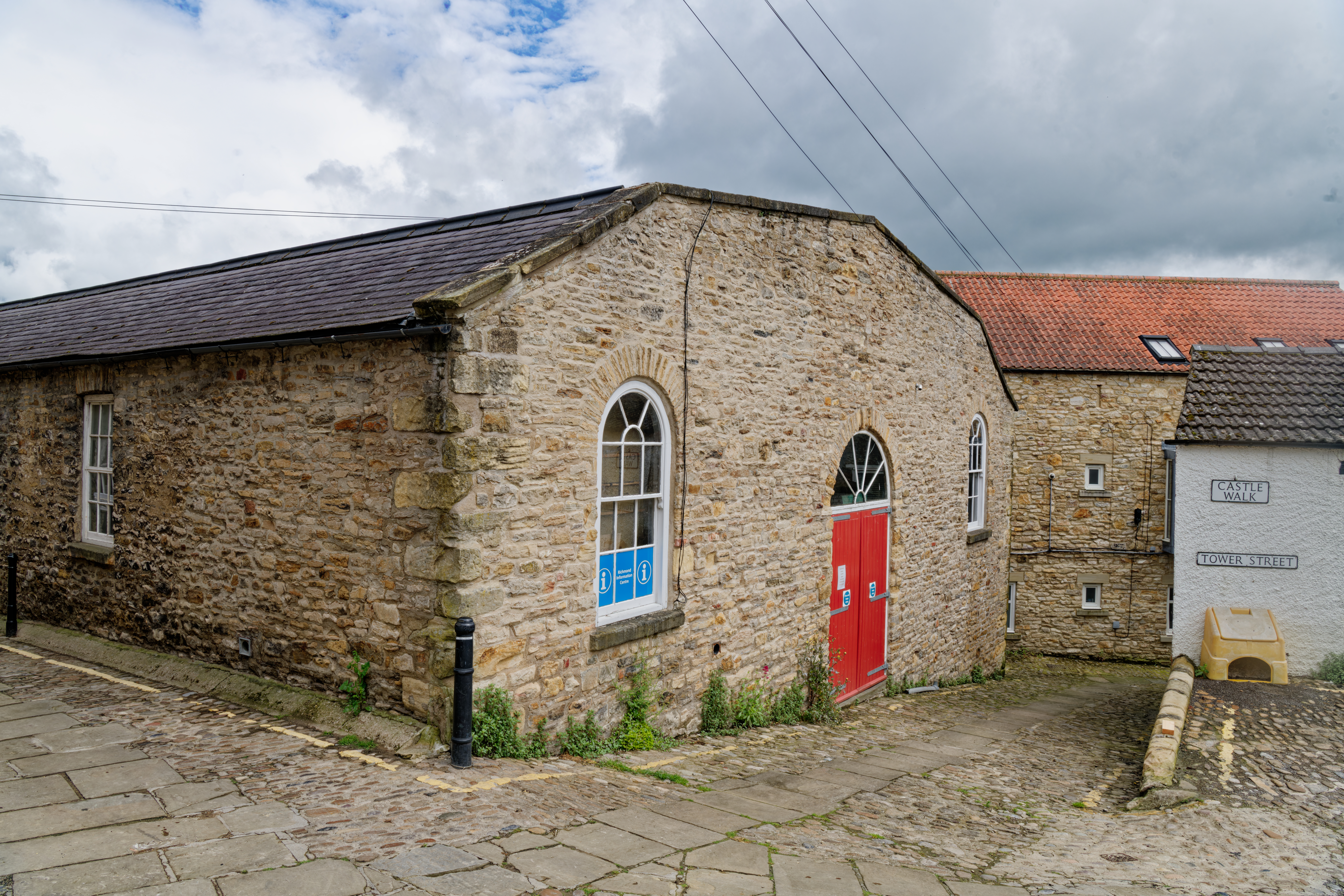
Rear facade of the market hall

The market hall is built of stone, with rusticated quoins and piers, and a Welsh slate roof. It has a front of three bays, each with a pediment and a dentilled cornice. Each bay contains a recessed round-headed arch with a triple keystone. The outer bays contain round-headed sash windows, and the middle bay has a doorway, over which is a large glazed fanlight.

== See also ==
- Listed buildings in Richmond, North Yorkshire (central area)
