= Green Howards Regimental Museum =

Museum in Richmond, North Yorkshire, England

The Green Howards Museum
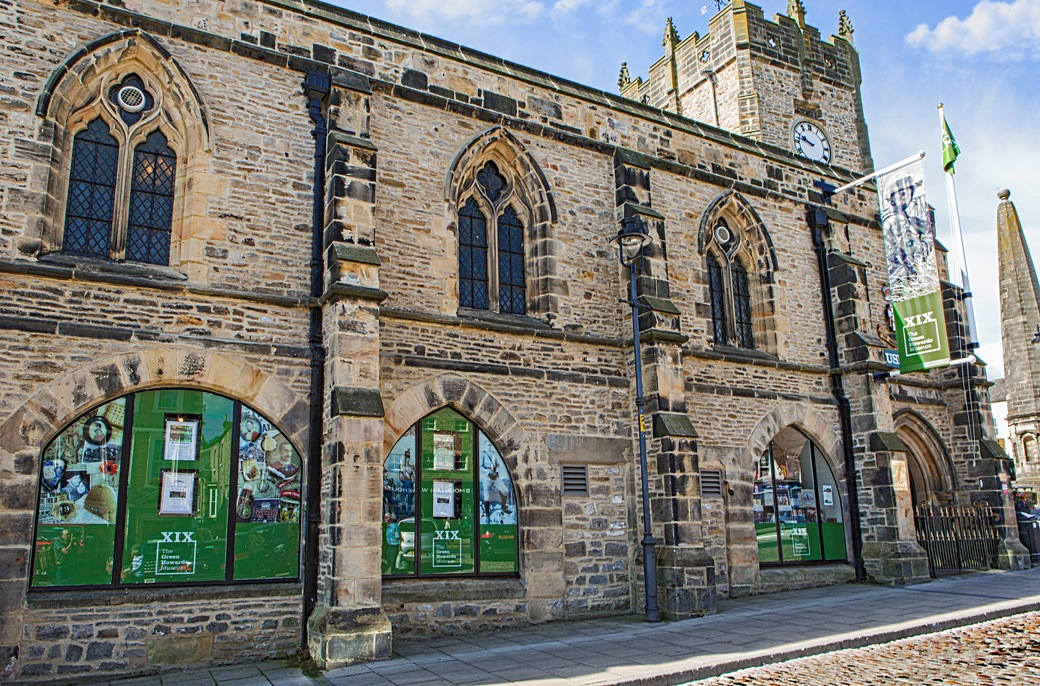
- The museum is in the centre of Richmond's market place

- Shown in North Yorkshire
- Established: 1922
- Location: Trinity Church Square, Richmond, North Yorkshire
- Coordinates: 54.403°N 1.737°W
- Type: Military
- Website: www.greenhowards.org.uk

The Green Howards Regimental Museum is the museum of the Green Howards infantry regiment of the British Army, located in Richmond, North Yorkshire.

The museum is located in the old Holy Trinity Church, Richmond, in the centre of the market place. The Green Howards were amalgamated with The Prince of Wales's Own Regiment of Yorkshire and The Duke of Wellington's Regiment, all Yorkshire-based regiments in the King's Division, to form The Yorkshire Regiment on 6 June 2006.

== History ==
Founded at Richmond Barracks in 1922, the museum moved to its present location in the centre of the market place in Richmond in 1973. It houses a collection which illustrates three centuries of the history of the regiment.

== Medal display ==
Within the museum's collection are 3,750 medals and decorations presented to members of the regiment, including 16 Victoria Crosses (VC) and three George Crosses.

The Victoria Cross for Lt Col Oliver Cyril Spencer Watson VC DSO Commanding the 2nd/5th King's Own Yorkshire Light Infantry at the time of his award of the VC is also held by the museum. He was awarded the VC for gallantry, on 28 March 1918 at Rossignol Wood, France. Organising bombing parties and leading attacks under intense fire, he was killed covering the withdrawal of his men.

The medal bar of Pte Henry Tandey VC DCM MM, who transferred from the Green Howards 12th Battalion on 26 July 1918 to the 5th Battalion The Duke of Wellington's (West Riding Regiment), is also held by the regiment. Tandey's VC was awarded for gallantry during a counter-attack following the capture of Marcoing, France, on 28 September 1918 and the citation for it was printed in the London Gazette on 14 December 1918. Tandey's DCM (Canal du Nord, during the 2nd Battle of Cambrai on 28 August 1918) and MM (Havrincourt on 12 September 1918) were also awarded while he was serving with the 5th Battalion.

== See also ==
- Green Howards
