= The Bar, Richmond =

Structure in Richmond, North Yorkshire, England

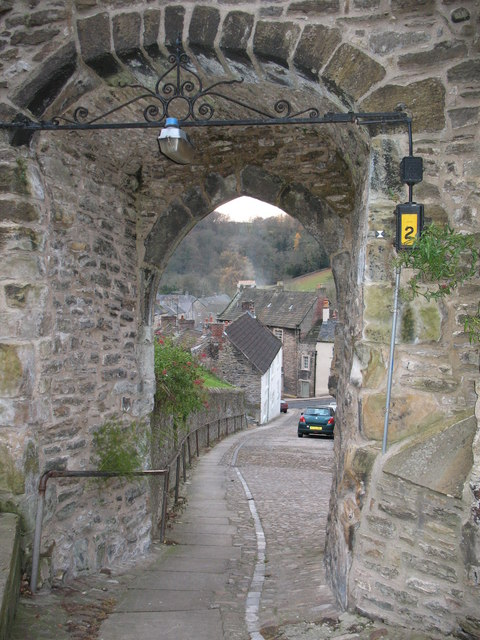
The Bar, in 2007

The Bar is a historic structure in Richmond, North Yorkshire, a town in England.

The town wall of Richmond was probably built in 1313. It was repaired in 1337 and again in 1400, but was already in ruins by the early 16th century. There were originally at least three main gates, plus the Friar's Postern, but the Frenchgate and Finkle Street gates were demolished in about 1773. The Bar, at the southwest corner of the marketplace, survives. It was grade II* listed in 1952.

The gateway is built of stone and consists of a semicircular arch with a chamfered surround. It is described by Nikolaus Pevsner as "perfectly simple", with a two-centred arch outside, and a segmental arch inside. On the west side are buttresses.

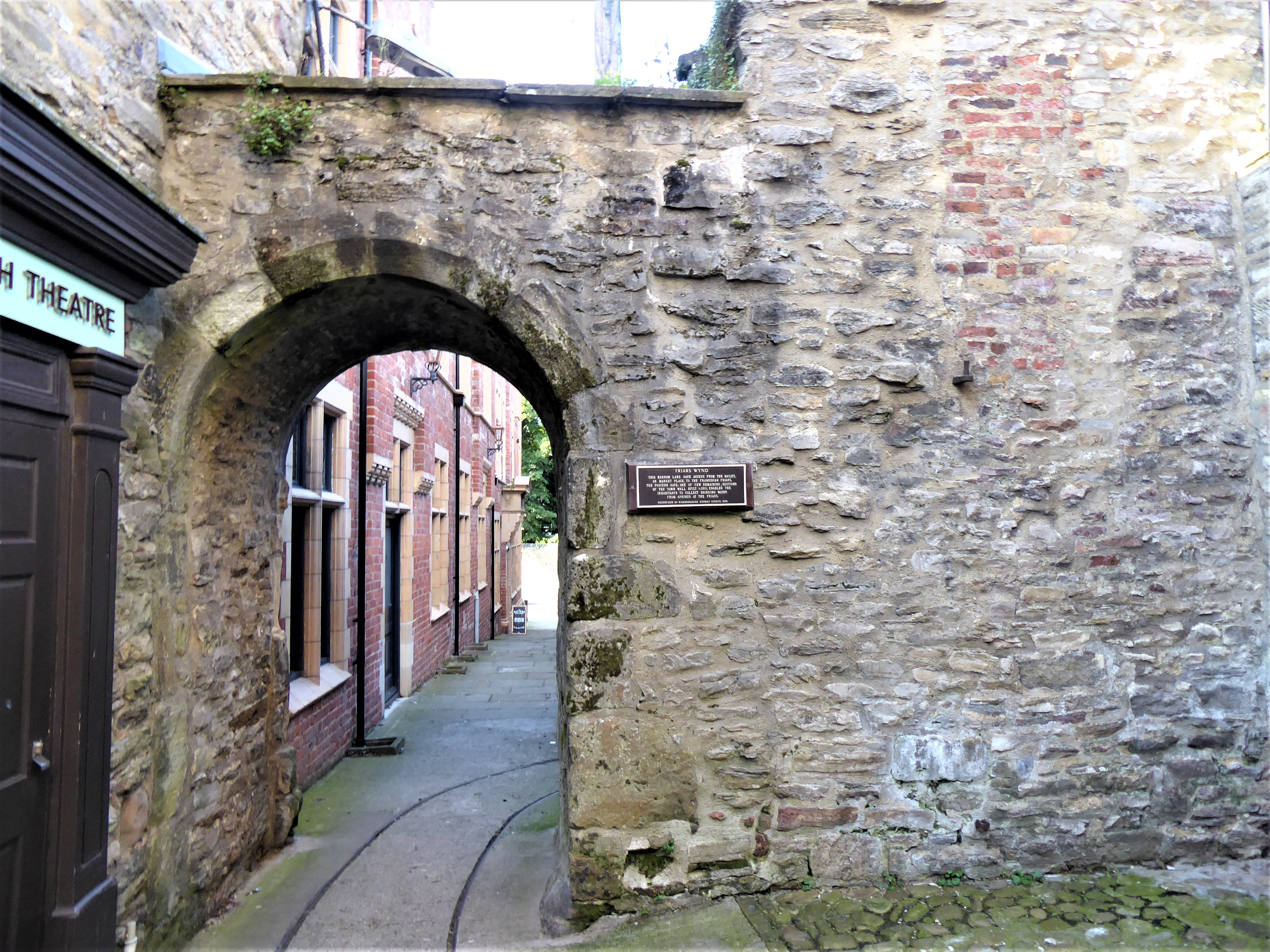
Friar's Postern

Friar's Postern, the postern gate on Friar's Wynd, is grade II listed. The semicircular archway is built of stone and is set in a surviving fragment of the town walls. The arch has been reconstructed using original material, with just the outer west jamb being original.

== See also ==
- Grade II* listed buildings in North Yorkshire (district)
- Listed buildings in Richmond, North Yorkshire (central area)
