= Richmond Barracks, North Yorkshire =

Former army barracks in North Yorkshire, England

Richmond Barracks
- Richmond
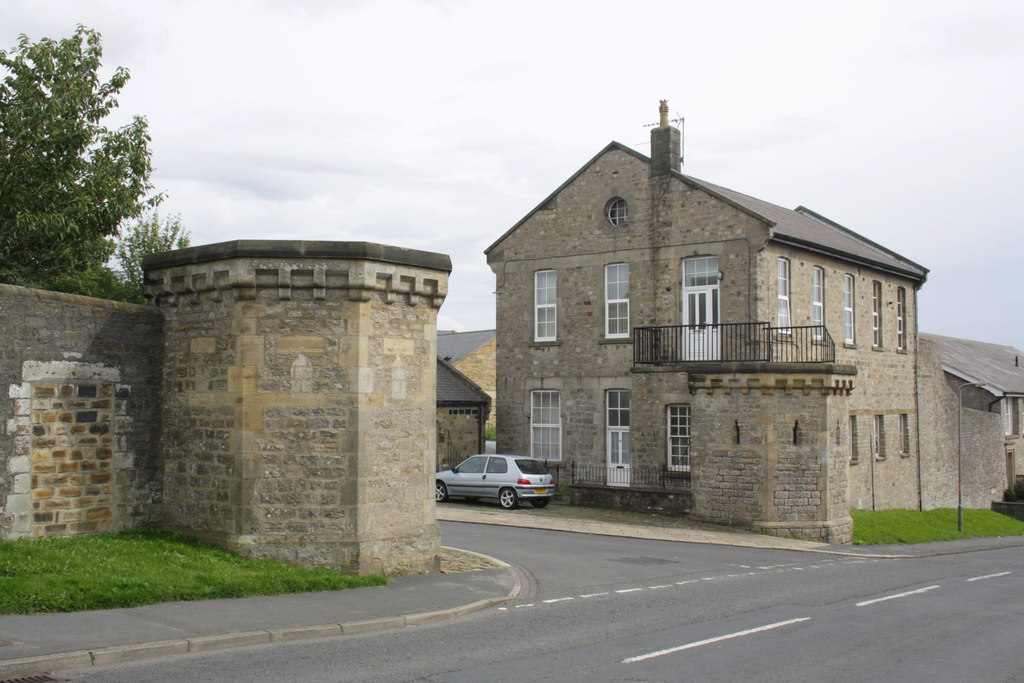
- Entrance towers to former barracks in Richmond

Site information
- Type: Barracks
- Owner: Ministry of Defence
- Operator: British Army

Location
- Location within North Yorkshire
- Coordinates: 54.41088°N 1.73242°W

Site history
- Built: 1875–1877
- Built for: War Office
- In use: 1877–1961

Garrison information
- Occupants: Green Howards

Richmond Barracks was a military installation in Richmond, North Yorkshire.

== History ==
The barracks were built as the depot of the two battalions of the 19th (The 1st Yorkshire North Riding - Princess of Wales's Own) Regiment of Foot between 1875 and 1877. Their creation took place as part of the Cardwell Reforms which encouraged the localisation of British military forces. Following the Childers Reforms, the 19th Regiment of Foot evolved to become the Green Howards with its depot at the barracks in 1881.

The barracks were demoted to the status of out-station to the Yorkshire Brigade depot at Queen Elizabeth Barracks in 1958 and at the same time renamed Alma Barracks after the Battle of Alma, in which conflict the Regiment took part during the Crimean War. The main part of the barracks closed in 1961 and the Regimental Headquarters and the Green Howards Museum moved to Holy Trinity Church, Richmond in 1973. The main site was converted for use as an approved school and, since 1985, as a housing development known as Garden Village.
