= Fergus Sheppard =

Architect in New Zealand (1908–1997)

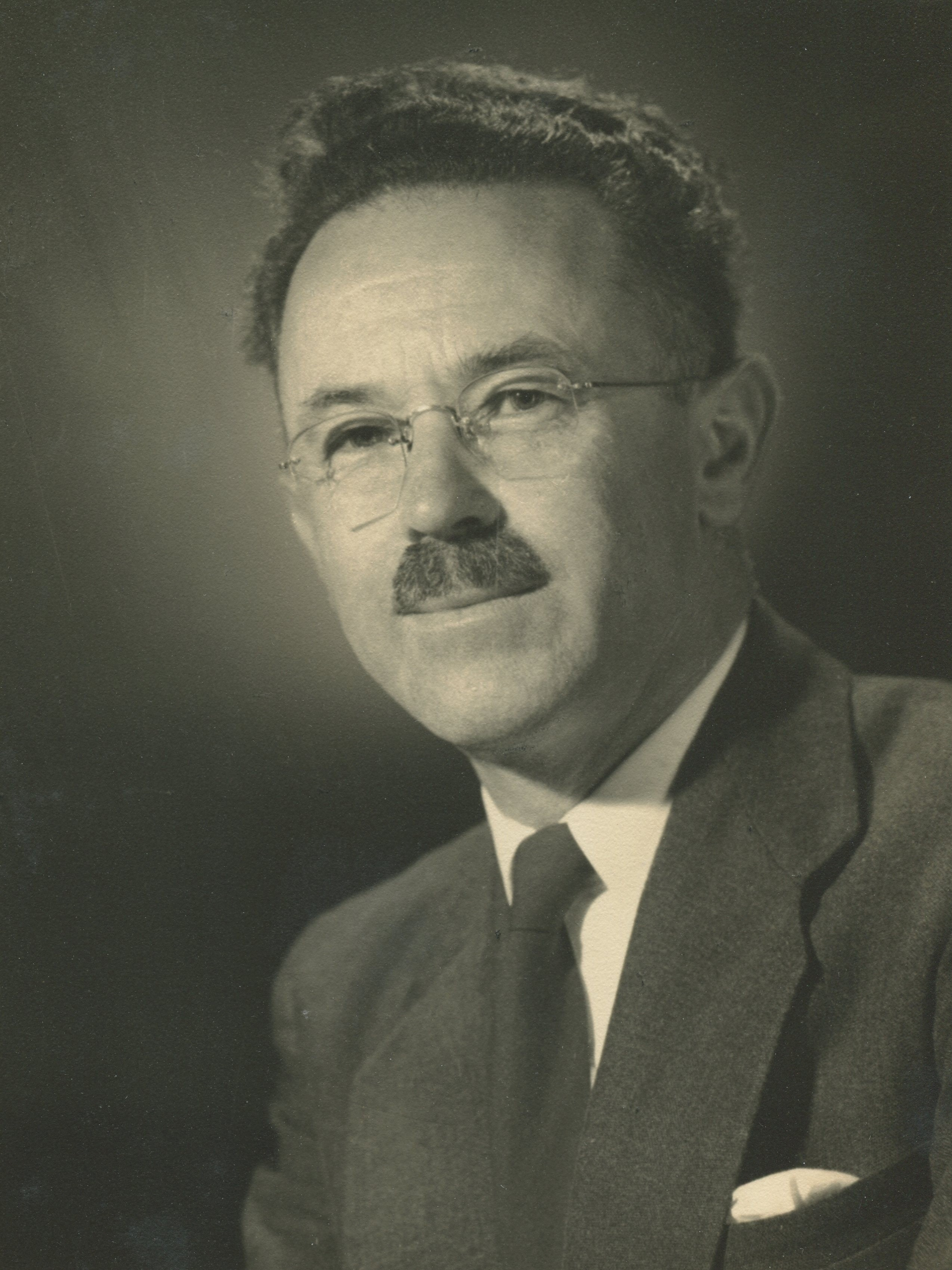
Fergus Sheppard

Fergus George Frederick Sheppard (1908 – 1997) was a New Zealand architect, who served as the chief government architect from 1959 until his retirement in 1971. During his time in this capacity he was involved with the design of the Beehive, among hundreds of other public buildings.

== Personal life ==
Fergus Sheppard was born in 1908 in Auckland, the youngest of two, and son of bootmaker Lewis George Frederick Sheppard and Lillian Gertrude Sheppard (née Green), both first generationers to be born in New Zealand. He attended Auckland Grammar, and then studied at Auckland University. In 1938, he married Marjorie Joan Targuse (1912 – 2008), daughter of Violet Targuse. They had four sons, one of whom was also an architect.

During World War Two, he served as a sapper (a combat engineer) and 1st lieutenant in the 4th Works Company.

He died in 1997.

== Professional career ==
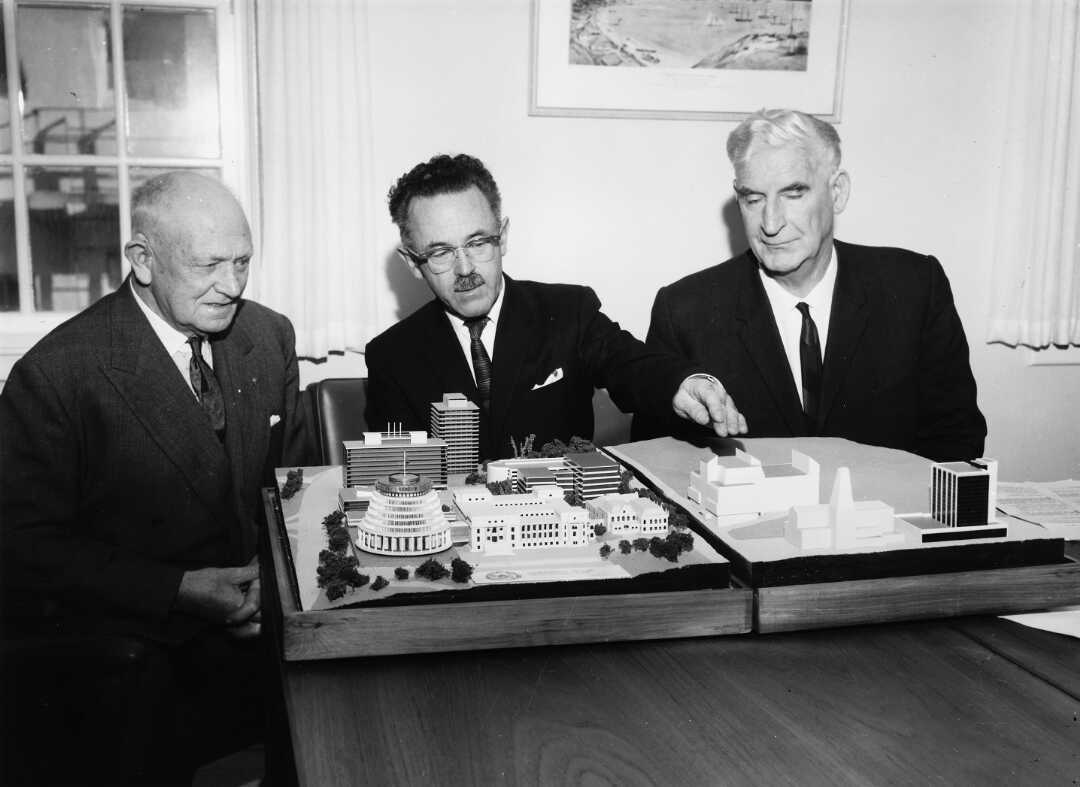
Sheppard (centre), with a model of the proposed National Library building, intended for a site in Hill Street, Wellington.

Sheppard was appointed as acting Government Architect with the Ministry of Works in February 1959, following the sudden death of Gordon Wilson, and fully assumed the role in May 1959. During his tenure there was a boom in construction of state owned buildings, and one estimate is that Sheppard was responsible for approximately 900 building projects, including many government buildings, educational buildings, and state housing. During this period, government architects designed buildings in a post-war modernist style. According to Duncan Joiner, the last to hold the title of Government Architect, "Many of the government buildings of this period are elegantly simple in concept, and economical in their use of materials and services, reflecting a New Zealand architectural design response to stringent import controls. It was a period of inventiveness, and during this time New Zealand engineers and architects established their international reputation for seismic design."

Sheppard produced the detailed architectural drawings of the Beehive, the executive wing of the New Zealand parliament, from the original concept designs by Scottish architect Sir Basil Spence, who is quoted as having remarked "It is not a Spence building, it is a Sheppard Building."

Sheppard retired in 1971.

He was elected a fellow of the Royal Society of Architects in 1969, held public roles as the President of the Royal Society of Arts, and as a member of the Historic Places Trust. He was chairman of the Wellington Branch of the Institute of Architects and went to hold key roles with the New Zealand Institute of Architects at national level.

The "Sheppard collection" held by the Architecture and Planning Library of the University of Auckland, was originally compiled by Sheppard in an effort to collect information on every New Zealand architect.

== Selected works ==
Among the buildings which Sheppard personally designed, collaborated on, or supervised the design of are:

Building	Image	Location	Notes
Auckland: Central Police Station			
Auckland: Commonwealth Pacific Cable Terminal		1 Akoranga Drive, Northcote, Auckland	
Auckland: Hobsonville Air Base's single men's barracks (1931), now demolished.		Hobsonville Point	
Auckland: Middlemore Hospital (1947)		Otahuhu, Auckland	Originally intended for the treatment of wounded soldiers from overseas
Auckland: Naval Hospital, Devonport (1941)		Calliope Road, Devonport	
Christchurch: University of Canterbury, Puaka–James Hight Building (originally named the James Hight Building) main library building (1969-1974)		Ilam, Christchurch	The Brutalist library building is a cornerstone of the Ilam university campus. Characterised by deeply set concrete frames, animated by an asymmetric arrangement of forms and intricate façade patterns in harmony with the landscape.
Christchurch: University of Canterbury, Science Block and Engineering School (1960)		Riccarton, Christchurch	
Huntly: Post Office (1939)			
Invercargill: Administrative Building (1960)			
Lower Hutt: Soil Bureau (now Learning Connexion Art School) (1960)		182 Eastern Hutt Rd, Taita, Lower Hutt	Sheppard and the director of the New Zealand Soil Bureau commissioned E. Mervyn Taylor to create a mural for the modernist building. With the restructuring of government departments in the early 1990s the Soil Bureau was rolled into a Crown Entity, and the building was tenanted and at some stage the mural was painted over.
Masterton: Chief Post Office (now privately owned).		122 Queen Street, Masterton	Featured a mural by E. Mervyn Taylor.
New Plymouth: Atkinson Building		139-141 Devon Street West, New Plymouth	Six-storey, 50,000 square foot building.
Palmerston North: Massey University Turitea Campus	Colombo Hall	Palmerston North	Colombo Hall is an example of late New Zealand international modernism, featuring a strong horizontal emphasis, a crisp, modulated appearance, and ground level open spaces, to provide transition between public and private areas as well as give the building an impression of lightness. Buildings designed later by Sheppard at Massey University feature a more Brutalist style.
Putāruru: Post Office (now former post office)		Tirau Street, Putāruru.	Circular design with delicate concrete arched roof shells. The modernist building was inspired by the Palazetto dello Sport stadium in Rome, Italy. The radial footprint and complex roof structure demonstrates significant innovation in both construction techniques and materials of its time.
Rotorua: Forest Research Institute		Rotorua	Features various forms of timber construction, to emphasize the versatility of timber as a building material.
Ruakura: Laboratory block, Ruakura State Farm (1939)		Ruakura State Farm	A large wooden one-storey structure consisting of two wings.
Tokoroa: Interdenominational church (1940)			
Upper Hutt: Wallaceville Animal Research Centre, Laboratory & Administration Blocks, Department of Agriculture		Wallaceville, Upper Hutt	
Waimate: Public Hospital (1950)			
Wellington: Executive Wing, Parliament Buildings (The Beehive)		40 Bowen Street, Pipitea, Wellington	
Wellington: Government Centre (also known as the Government Printing Office, then Archives New Zealand)		Murphy Street, Wellington.	
Wellington: Meteorological Office (now MetService)		30 Salamanca Road, Kelburn, Wellington, 1962.	Four storey, free-standing reinforced concrete structure
Wellington: National Library of New Zealand		70 Molesworth Street, Wellington.	The facade is an inverted pyramid constructed of alternating bands of pronounced concrete panels and deep-set slot windows. The fortress-like exterior conveys an image of a national library that is a safe-keeper of materials; a deliberate architectural design strategy from a specific historical time when national libraries were less interested in intellectual and physical accessibility. The National Library was the last major building to be completed by the Ministry of Works and Development before it was dis-established in the 1980s.
Wellington Girls' College tower block			

== Legacy ==
In 2021, the former Putāruru Post Office (1970) was the recipient of an "Enduring Architecture Award" in the New Zealand Institute of Architects (NZIA) Waikato Bay of Plenty Architecture Awards.

In 2024, the University of Canterbury – Puaka-James Hight (Central Library) Building (1969-1974) received the "Enduring Architecture Award" in the NZIA Canterbury Region Architecture Awards.
