= Richmond Market Cross =

Obelisk in Richmond, North Yorkshire, England

Coordinates: 54.4031°N 1.7381°W

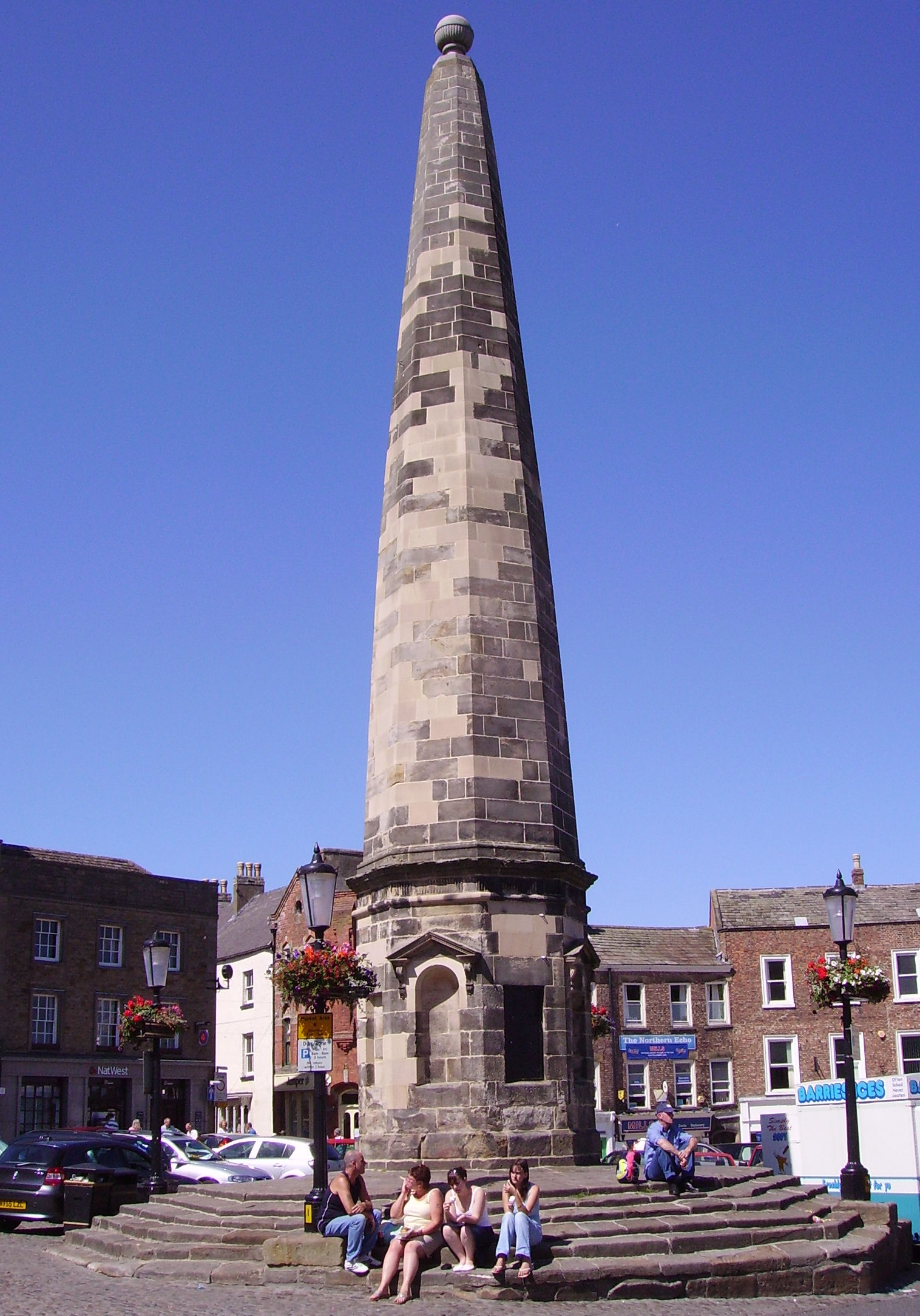
The obelisk, in 2006

Richmond Market Cross is a historic structure in Richmond, North Yorkshire, a town in England.

A mediaeval cross stood in Richmond's market square; Christopher Clarkson described it as "the greatest beauty in the Town". It was atop a plinth, surrounded by a 6 feet (1.8 m)-wall, ornamented with the shields of four local families, and with a stone dog at each corner. Despite this, the cross was demolished and replaced with a tall obelisk, which was completed in 1771. It has been a focal point for the town, with the maypole, stocks, pillory and boulder for bear baiting all having been located around it. Under the obelisk is a 12,000 imperial gallons (55,000 L)-tank which long served as the town's main reservoir. The Victoria County History describes the obelisk as "not an interesting structure", but the Darlington and Stockton Times claims it is "characterfully curious".

The cross consists of a stone tapering obelisk with an octagonal plan. It stands on a plinth with alternating rectangular and round-headed niches, the latter with small pediments on brackets. Above it is a fluted frieze and a moulded cornice, and the obelisk is surmounted by a granite ball finial. The obelisk bulges with what Nikolaus Pevsner describes as a "stupa-like entasis". It has been grade II* listed since 1952.

== See also ==
- Grade II* listed buildings in North Yorkshire (district)
- Listed buildings in Richmond, North Yorkshire (central area)
