= Kings Head Hotel, Richmond =

Building in Richmond, North Yorkshire, England

Coordinates: 54.4035°N 1.7373°W

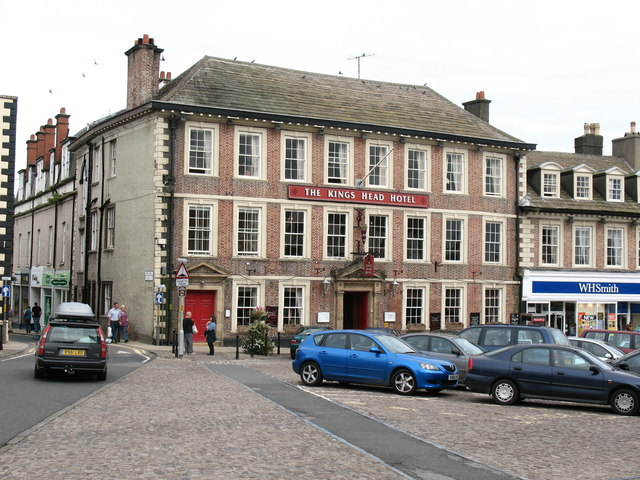
The building, in 2008

The Kings Head Hotel is a historic building in Richmond, North Yorkshire, a town in England.

The building was constructed in 1717 by Charles Bathurst, and was probably the first brick building in the town. It may originally have been designed as a house, but by 1725, it was in use as a hotel. Early attractions for guests in the garden included a cock pit, a bowling green, and performing pigs. In 1765, it was purchased by Sir Lawrence Dundas, and the Dundas family owned the hotel until 1897. In 1813, the neighbouring King's Arms Inn was demolished and replaced with a new street. This permitted the insertion of a first-floor ballroom with large windows overlooking the road. Franz Liszt performed in the ballroom in 1841, and J. M. W. Turner stayed, describing the hotel as "the finest in Richmondshire". In 1916, part of the ground floor was let to Lloyds Bank, for which a separate entrance was created, although by the late 20th century the area had been reincorporated into the hotel.

The hotel is built of red brick, rendered on the left return, with stone dressings, a plinth with moulded capping, rusticated quoins, a moulded eaves cornice and a hipped stone slate roof. It has three storeys and is eight bays wide. The central doorway has a moulded shouldered architrave, a doorway in the left bay has a plain surround, and both have a decorative frieze and pediment. The windows are sashes with moulded frames and sills, and keystones. The building has been grade II* listed since 1952.

== See also ==
- Grade II* listed buildings in North Yorkshire (district)
- Listed buildings in Richmond, North Yorkshire (central area)
