= 58 and 59 Market Place =

Building in Richmond, North Yorkshire, England

Coordinates: 54°24′11″N 1°44′09″W

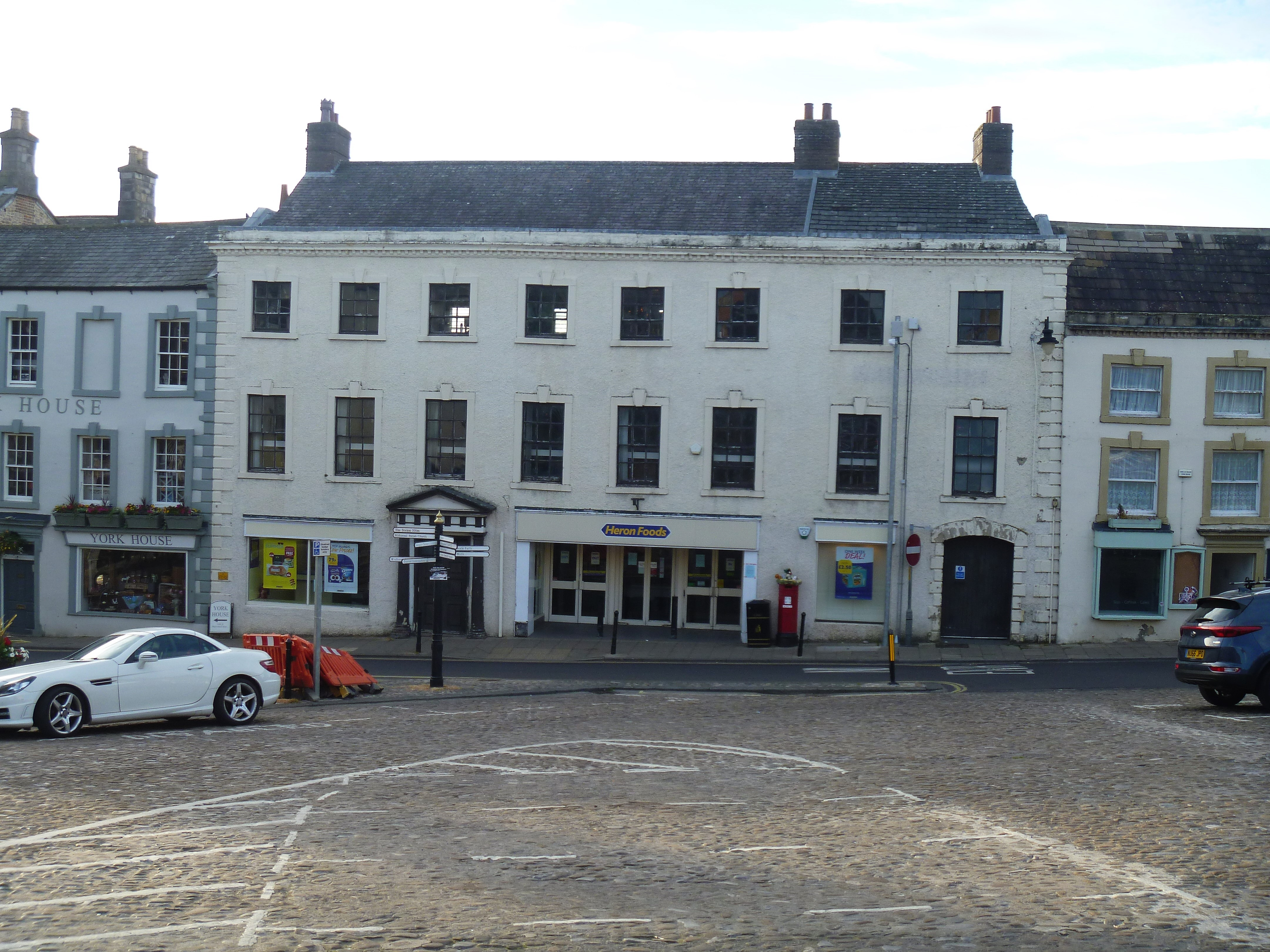
The building, in 2022

58 and 59 Market Place is a historic building in Richmond, North Yorkshire, a town in England.

The building was constructed in the mid 18th century, as a large house. In the early 19th century, the doorway and flanking windows were replaced. The building was grade II* listed in 1952. From the 1970s, the building was occupied by Woolworths, then after the chain closed in 2009, it was used by Heron Foods.

The building is in painted roughcast, with rusticated quoins, a moulded cornice with modillions, a parapet, and a roof partly of slate and partly of pantile. It has three storeys and eight bays. Part of the ground floor is recessed, and to the left is a doorway with engaged Tuscan columns, a three-light fanlight, a triglyph frieze, and a moulded pediment. Also on this floor are two shop windows, and in the right bay is a segmental-headed carriage archway with shaped jambs and a rusticated keystone. The upper floors contain sash windows with rusticated keystones.

== See also ==
- Grade II* listed buildings in North Yorkshire (district)
- Listed buildings in Richmond, North Yorkshire (central area)
