= Pierre Burrows =

New Zealand architect

Pierre Finch Martineau Burrows
- Born: 1842; Norwich, Norfolk, England
- Died: 21 April 1920 (aged 77–78); New Plymouth, New Zealand
- Resting place: Te Henui Cemetery
- Occupation: Architect
- Years active: 1865–1908
- Relatives: Arthur Washington Burrows
- Practice: Public Works Department

Pierre Finch Martineau Burrows was a New Zealand architect who worked for the government in designing many judicial buildings. Burrows emigrated to New Zealand from England and started a private architectural practice before later joining the Public Works Department under Colonial Architect William Clayton. After Clayton's death Burrows took over his position until being made redundant. Burrows returned to private practice for a bit before eventually rejoining the Public Works Department in a lesser role. Burrows retired in 1908 and died 12 years later.

Many of Burrows works are registered with Heritage New Zealand with his most notable works being the Old Supreme Court building, the Mount Eden Prison, the Chief Post Office, Christchurch, and the Waimate Courthouse.

== Early life ==
Burrows was born in Norwich, Norfolk, England, to a Huguenot family in 1842. (Note: Burrows third name suggests a matrilineal connection to the Martineau family.) Burrows went was educated at Norwich Grammar School and received his architectural qualifications in Norwich. Burrows and his brother, Arthur, came to New Zealand aboard the Victory arriving in Auckland in 1865. Burrows married 12 July 1886 at St David's Presbyterian Church on Symonds Street.

== Architectural career ==
Burrows undertook private practice work around Auckland until joining the Public Works Department in 1874 as Chief Draughtsman. After Colonial Architect William Clayton died in 1877 Burrows was appointed to be in charge of the department, although he did not hold the role of Colonial Architect. (Note: Officially only William Clayton ever held the position of Colonial Architect.) The end of the Vogel Era saw a reduction in the department's funding and projects it undertook. During Burrow's tenure he oversaw the design of the Supreme Court House in Wellington and the Mount Eden Prison. In 1878 the Public Works Department was split to cover the North and South Islands respectively; Burrows was responsible for work in the North Island. Burrows was made redundant in 1884 and went back to private practice, working in both Auckland and Wellington. In 1885 Burrows petitioned Parliament about being appointed to Colonial Architect. In 1893 Burrows formed a partnership with Frederick Turnbull, this partnership lasted a year and designed just six houses. In 1895 Burrows rejoined the Public Works Department and was working on the main trunk railway line at Hunterville. Burrows was also responsible for work in the wider lower-central North Island before transferring to the Wellington office in 1905 after the Hunterville office had closed. Burrows retired in 1908. Burrows likely lost the role due to poor government finances and austerity.

== Personal life ==
Burrows died in New Plymouth 21 April 1920 and was buried at Te Henui Cemetery.

During his first tenure with the Public Works Department Burrows lived in Karori with his family. Burrows rented out the home Glendaurel, now registered as a category 2 building with Heritage New Zealand. (Note: Burrows did not design the property)

Burrows attended St Mary's Anglican Church with his family whilst living in Karori. Burrows designed a parochial hall for the congregation. (Note: This hall has since been demolished)

== Legacy ==
Victoria University of Wellington has a scholarship in Burrow's honour for Bachelor of Architectural Studies students. The scholarship was established by Burrow's granddaughter.

== List of works ==
Name	Date	Image	Note	Ref
St Luke's Church, Mt Albert	1872		Registered as a category 2 building with Heritage New Zealand	
Waimate Courthouse	1879		Registered as a category 1 building with Heritage New Zealand	
Old Supreme Court, Wellington	1879		Extensions to the building were designed by John Campbell in the same style as Burrow's work. Registered as a category 1 building with Heritage New Zealand	
Warkworth Courthouse	1880		Registered as a category 2 building with Heritage New Zealand	
Lyttelton Police Station	1880		Registered as a category 2 building with Heritage New Zealand. Demolished following the 2010 Canterbury earthquake	
Taupo Courthouse	1881		Building has been altered to the point only a coat of arms remains of the original building. Registered as a category 2 building with Heritage New Zealand	
Mount Cook Prison	1882		Demolished 1925	
Mount Eden Prison	1883		Registered as a category 1 building with Heritage New Zealand	
Waiuku Courthouse	1883		Registered as a category 2 building with Heritage New Zealand	
Carterton Courthouse	1883		Scheduled with the Carterton District Council	
Masterton Courthouse	1884		Relocated to Te Oreore. Scheduled with the Masterton District Council	
Ophir Post Office	1886		Registered as a category 1 building with Heritage New Zealand	
Inglewood railway station	1876		Unknown architect, possibly Burrows. Registered as a category 1 building with Heritage New Zealand	
Port Chalmer's Post Office	1877		Possibly designed by Burrows. Registered as a category 1 building with Heritage New Zealand	
Chief Post Office, Christchurch	1877		Designed by William Clayton but Burrows took over the project following his death. An extension in 1907 was designed by Burrows. Registered as a category 1 building with Heritage New Zealand	
Dunedin North Post Office	1879		Attributed to Burrows by Lewis Martin but attributed to William Clayton by Heritage New Zealand. Registered as a category 2 building with Heritage New Zealand	
Oxford Lock-up	1879		Unknown architect but was designed by the Public Works Department during Burrows heading of the office. Registered as a category 2 building with Heritage New Zealand	
Mount Cook Police Barracks	1894		Unknown architect with Burrows possibly being involved. Registered as a category 1 building with Heritage New Zealand	
