= New Zealand Government Architect =

Former New Zealand government appointment

The position of Government Architect in New Zealand was established in 1909 within the Public Works Department (from 1947, the Ministry of Works and Development). The New Zealand Government Architect was head of the ministry's Architectural Division. When the ministry was dissolved in 1988, the title remained in use until 1992.

The predecessors of the Government Architect, was the Colonial Architect, established by the colonial government under the office of the Superintendent of Public Works in 1869. They and their tenures were:

- William Henry Clayton 1869–77, officially the only Colonial Architect, but this work was continued by
- Pierre Finch Martineau Burrows 1877–84, officially "Architect" and "Architect for North Island"
- Charles Edward Beatson 1884–87, officially "Draftsman"
- John Campbell 1898–1909, officially "Architect" in the Public Works Department

The Government Architects and their tenures were:

- John Campbell 1909—1922
- John Thomas Mair 1923—1941
- Robert Adams Patterson 1941—1952
- Francis Gordon Wilson 1952—1959
- Fergus George Frederick Sheppard 1959—1971
- John Robert Patrick Blake-Kelly 1971—1973
- Frank Anderson 1973—1976
- Graydon Miskimmin 1976—1986
- Peter Fage 1986—1988
- Duncan Joiner 1988—1992
