= Holy Trinity Church, Richmond =

Former church in North Yorkshire, England

Coordinates: 54.4031°N 1.7375°W

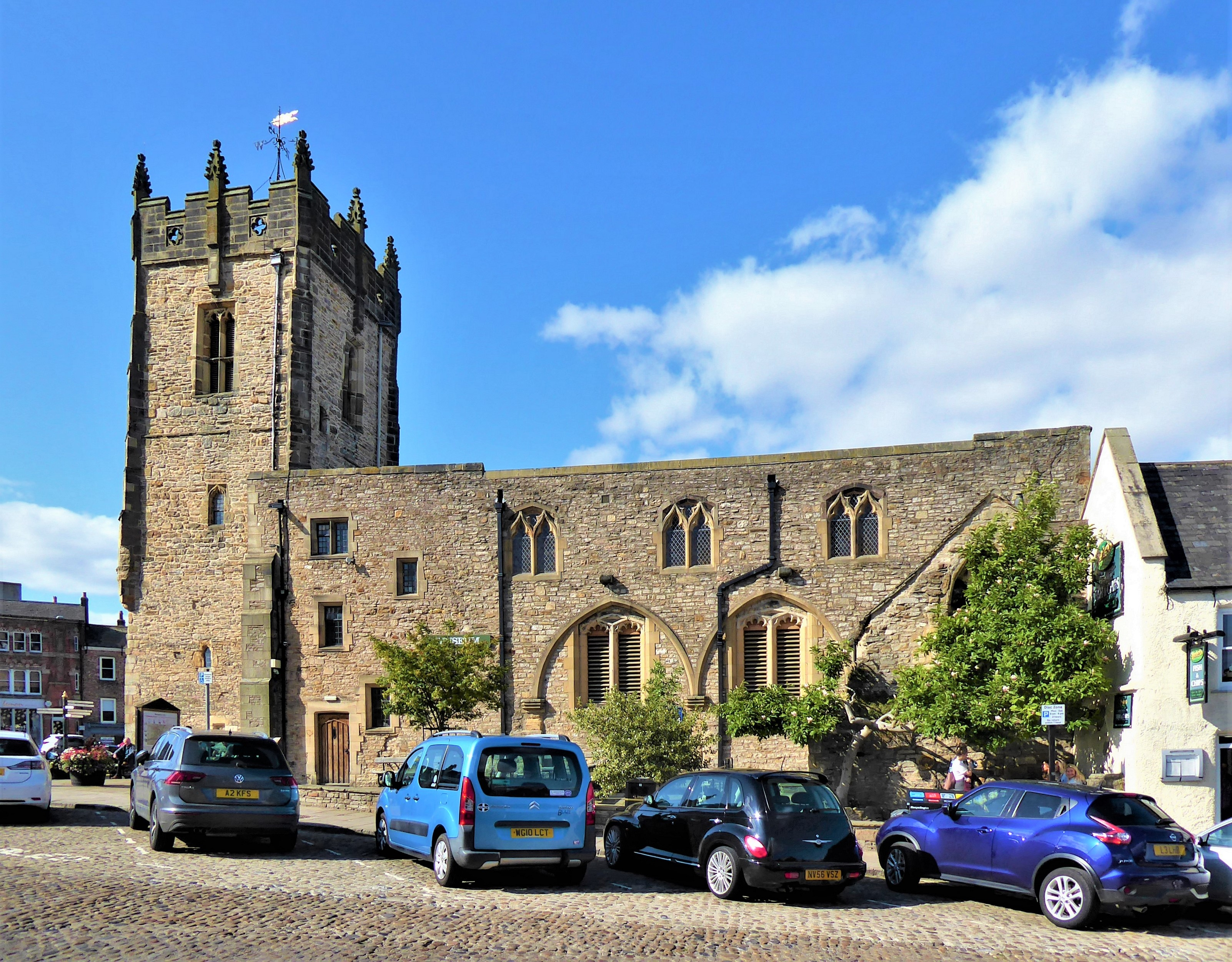
The building, in 2019

Holy Trinity Church is a former church in Richmond, North Yorkshire, a town in England.

The church was first recorded in 1330, as a chapel of ease to St Mary's Church, Richmond. The current building is largely 14th and 15th century, although Nikolaus Pevsner claims that the tower has some Norman masonry and one window which might be from that period. The tower was separate from the remainder of the church, and a shop was later built in the gap. The north aisle was later separated from the church to serve as a consistory court, while the south aisle was in ruins by 1740, when it was replaced by a row of shops.

In the late 18th century, the building was restored and services resumed after a gap. In 1864, the church was again restored, with the north aisle becoming part of the church, albeit with shops underneath. In the 20th century, the shop between the tower and the body of the church was demolished and replaced with offices. The church was closed and deconsecrated in the 1960s, and in 1973 it was converted to become the Green Howards Regimental Museum. The building has been grade I listed since 1952. Pevsner describes the church as "the queerest ecclesiastical building one can imagine".

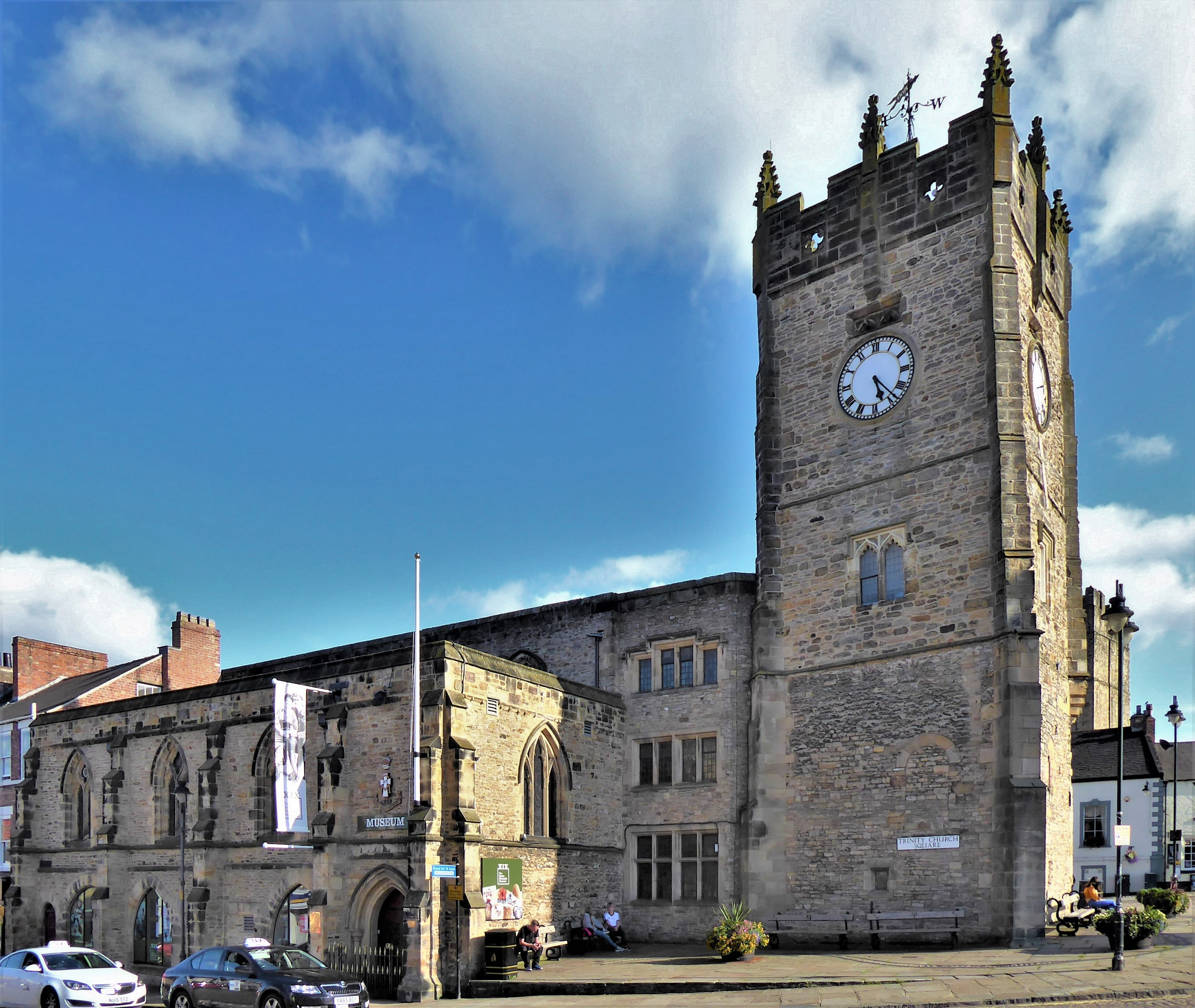
View from the north

The church is built of stone, and consists of a west tower, a nave, a chancel, and a north aisle. The tower has three stages, diagonal buttresses, and an embattled parapet pierced by quatrefoils, with corner and central crocketed finials. Part of the former south transept remains, in ruins. The windows are 19th century, and no early features survive internally.

The north aisle is separately grade II listed. It is built of stone, with floor bands, two storeys, and four bays divided by stepped buttresses. The main doorway, with a pointed arch, is in the right bay, and there is a smaller round-arched doorway on the extreme left. The other bays contain windows, that in the left bay with a round-arched head, and the others with pointed arches. On the left three bays of the upper storey are windows with pointed arches, and above them is a parapet.

== See also ==
- Grade I listed buildings in North Yorkshire (district)
- Listed buildings in Richmond, North Yorkshire (central area)
