= Listed parks and gardens in Yorkshire and the Humber =

The Register of Historic Parks and Gardens of Special Historic Interest in England, created in 1983, is administered by Historic England. It includes more than 1,600 sites, ranging from gardens of private houses, to cemeteries and public parks.

There are 128 registered parks and gardens in Yorkshire and the Humber. 7 are listed at grade I, the highest grade, 23 at grade II*, the middle grade, and 98 at grade II, the lowest grade.

== Key ==
Grade	Criteria
I	Parks and gardens of exceptional interest, sometimes considered to be internationally important
II*	Particularly important parks and gardens of more than special interest
II	Parks and gardens of national importance and special interest

== Parks and gardens ==
=== East Riding of Yorkshire ===
Name	Grade	Location	Type	Completed (Note: The date given is the date used by Historic England as significant for the initial building or that of an important part in the structure's description.)	Grid ref. (Note: The grid reference is based on the British national grid reference system, sometimes known as OSGB36, used by the Ordnance Survey.) Geo-coordinates	Entry number (Note: The "List Entry Number" is a unique number assigned to each listed building and scheduled monument by Historic England.)	Image
Burton Constable	II*	Burton Constable	Garden	1782	TA1868736901	1000921	Burton Constable
Dalton Hall	II*	Dalton Holme	Garden	1737	SE9552045534	1000922	Dalton Hall
East Park	II	Kingston upon Hull	Park	1887	TA1176331179	1001519	East Park
Houghton Hall	II	Market Weighton	Garden	1768	SE8817639107	1000923	Houghton Hall
Londesborough Hall	II*	Londesborough	Garden	Late 17th century	SE 86498 45170	1000924	Londesborough Hall
Pearson Park	II	Sculcoates	Park	1861	TA 08581 30407	1001520	Pearson Park
Risby Hall	II	Rowley	Garden	Late 18th century	TA 00958 35153	1001419	Risby Hall
Sledmere House	I	Sledmere	Garden	1800	SE9384564349	1000925	Sledmere House
Thwaite Hall	II	Cottingham	Garden	1839	TA 05392 32798	1000137	Thwaite Hall

=== Lincolnshire ===
Name	Grade	Location	Type	Completed	Grid ref. Geo-coordinates	Entry number	Image
People's Park	II*	Grimsby	Park	1883	TA 26983 08349	1001505	People's Park

=== North Yorkshire ===
Name	Grade	Location	Type	Completed	Grid ref. Geo-coordinates	Entry number	Image
Aldby Park	II*	Buttercrambe with Bossall	Garden	1746	SE 73043 58452	1001055	Aldby Park
Allerton Park	II	Allerton Mauleverer	Garden	1720s	SE 41202 58432	1000402	Allerton Park
Arncliffe Hall	II	Ingleby Arncliffe	Garden	1770s	NZ 45260 00167	1001283	Arncliffe Hall
Aske Hall	II	Aske	Garden	Mid 18th century	NZ1722203202	1001056	Aske Hall
Beningbrough Hall	II	Newton-on-Ouse	Garden	1827	SE 51753 58851	1001057	Beningbrough Hall
Broughton Hall	II	Elslack	Garden	1857	SD9422550761	1001058	Broughton Hall
Castle Howard	I	Slingsby	Garden	1738	SE7147370728	1001059	Castle Howard
Constable Burton Hall	II	Constable Burton	Garden	18th century	SE1547591670	1001060	Constable Burton Hall
Duncombe Park	I	Sproxton	Garden	1730	SE5984682924	1001061	Duncombe Park
Ebberston Hall	II*	Ebberston	Garden	1718	SE8932683541	1001062	Ebberston Hall
Forcett Hall	II	Forcett	Garden	1740	NZ 17149 11943	1001063	Forcett Hall
Gilling Castle	II	Yearsley	Garden	Early 18th century	SE 59871 75877	1001064	Gilling Castle
Gledstone Hall	II	Martons Both	Garden	1920s	SD 88739 51204	1001312	Gledstone Hall
Grantley Hall Japanese Garden	II	Grantley	Garden	1910	SE2422269366	1442593	Grantley Hall Japanese Garden
Hackfall	I	Burton-on-Yore	Garden	1749	SE2336377354	1000130	Hackfall
Hornby Castle Park	II	Hornby	Garden	1770s	SE2313394229	1420079	Hornby Castle Park
Howsham Hall	II	Howsham	Garden	1776	SE 73494 62927	1001427	Howsham Hall
Long Walk	II	Knaresborough	Park	1739	SE 34749 56544	1000132	Long Walk
Middleton Lodge	II	Middleton Tyas	Garden	1780	NZ 22397 06816	1001699	Middleton Lodge
Moreby Hall	II	Stillingfleet	Garden	Early 19th century	SE 59687 43187	1001452	Moreby Hall
Mulgrave Castle	II*	Newholm-cum-Dunsley	Garden	1790s	NZ8396712294	1001065	Mulgrave Castle
Museum Gardens	II	York	Park	1844	SE 59917 52086	1000117	Museum Gardens
Newburgh Priory	II	Oulston	Garden	1740	SE5603875983	1001066	Newburgh Priory
Newby Hall	II	Bishop Monkton	Garden	Late 18th century	SE3480967692	1001067	Newby Hall
Norton Conyers	II	Wath	Garden	1774	SE3143276439	1001068	Norton Conyers
Nun Appleton Hall	II	Acaster Selby	Garden	1640s	SE 55573 40399	1001069	Nun Appleton Hall
Nunnington Hall	II	Nunnington	Garden	Late 17th century	SE6705079435	1001070	Nunnington Hall
Parcevall Hall	II	Appletreewick	Garden	1933	SE 06955 61125	1001589	Parcevall Hall
Peasholm Park	II	Scarborough	Park	1912	TA 03410 89454	1001464	Peasholm Park
Plumpton Rocks	II*	Plompton	Garden	1750s	SE 35532 53730	1000535	Plumpton Rocks
The Retreat Gardens	II*	York	Garden	1797	SE6156850807	1459114	The Retreat Gardens
Ribston Hall	II	Goldsborough	Garden	Late 18th century	SE 40034 53817	1001071	Ribston Hall
Rievaulx Terrace	I	Rievaulx	Garden	1758	SE5778584763	1001072	Rievaulx Terrace
Ripley Castle	II	Clint cum Hamlets	Garden	1830s	SE 27739 60832	1000401	Ripley Castle
Rowntree Park	II	York	Park	1921	SE 60374 50653	1001439	Rowntree Park
Rudding Park	II	Follifoot	Garden	Early 19th century	SE3344352753	1000403	Rudding Park
Scampston Hall	II*	Rillington	Garden	1770s	SE8642775044	1000374	Scampston Hall
Sheriff Hutton Park	II*	Sheriff Hutton	Garden	Early 17th century	SE 66100 65603	1001462	Sheriff Hutton Park
St Nicholas	II	Richmond	Garden	1925	NZ 17948 00991	1001073	St Nicholas
Studley Royal	II	Littlethorpe	Garden	1730	SE2760767054	1000410	Studley Royal
Swinton Castle	II*	Swinton with Warthermarske	Garden	1760	SE2035179928	1001074	Swinton Castle
Temple Grounds	II	Richmond	Garden	Early 19th century	NZ 16604 00788	1001317	Temple Grounds
Thorp Perrow Arboretum	II	Snape with Thorp	Arboretum	1977	SE2593985635	1001075	Thorp Perrow Arboretum
University of York West Campus	II	York	University campus	1980	SE6226250375	1456517	University of York West Campus
Valley Gardens	II	Harrogate	Park	1880s	SE2904654789	1001076	Valley Gardens
Valley Gardens and South Cliff Gardens	II	Scarborough	Park	1930s	TA 04446 87765	1001528	Valley Gardens and South Cliff Gardens
Whitby Abbey House	II	Whitby	Garden	1700	NZ 90268 11107	1001467	Whitby Abbey House
York Cemetery	II*	York	Cemetery	1837	SE 61102 50875	1001596	York Cemetery

=== South Yorkshire ===
Name	Grade	Location	Type	Completed	Grid ref. Geo-coordinates	Entry number	Image
Beauchief Hall	II	Sheffield	Garden	Late 17th century	SK 32894 81514	1001670	Beauchief Hall
Boston Park	II	Rotherham	Park	1870s	SK 43034 91441	1001500	Boston Park
Brodsworth Hall	II*	Brodsworth	Garden	Mid 19th century	SE 50860 06749	1001250	Brodsworth Hall
Burngreave Cemetery	II	Sheffield	Cemetery	1860	SK 36062 89299	1001603	Burngreave Cemetery
Cannon Hall	II	Cawthorne	Garden	1760s	SE2727508118	1001159	Cannon Hall
City Road Cemetery	II	Sheffield	Cemetery	1881	SK 37404 86040	1001655	City Road Cemetery
Clifton Park	II	Rotherham	Park	1891	SK 43644 92903	1001503	Clifton Park
Cusworth Hall	II	Cusworth	Garden	1765	SE 54509 03678	1000412	Cusworth Hall
The Dell	II	Doncaster	Park	1929	SE 55879 02060	1001501	The Dell
Hickleton Hall	II	Hickleton	Garden	1909	SE 48231 04749	1001151	Hickleton Hall
Locke Park	II	Barnsley	Park	1877	SE 33948 05261	1001518	Locke Park
Monument Grounds	II	Sheffield	Park	1838	SK 36130 86707	1000284	Monument Grounds
Moorgate Cemetery	II	Rotherham	Cemetery	1841	SK 43070 91689	1001653	Moorgate Cemetery
Norfolk Heritage Park	II*	Sheffield	Park	1848	SK 36588 85946	1001302	Norfolk Heritage Park
Oakes Park	II	Sheffield	Garden	Early 18th century	SK 36598 82135	1001160	Oakes Park
Porter Valley Parks	II	Sheffield	Park	1938	SK3064585044	1001502	Porter Valley Parks
Sandbeck Park and Roche Abbey	II*	Maltby	Garden	1778	SK5445389707	1001161	Sandbeck Park and Roche Abbey
Sheffield Botanical Gardens	II	Sheffield	Botanical garden	1836	SK 33554 86242	1001162	Sheffield Botanical Gardens
Sheffield General Cemetery	II*	Sheffield	Cemetery	1836	SK 34180 85910	1001391	Sheffield General Cemetery
Wentworth Castle	I	Stainborough	Garden	1730	SE3238602559	1000415	Wentworth Castle
Wentworth Woodhouse	II*	Wentworth	Garden	1790s	SK 38940 94732	1001163	Wentworth Woodhouse
Weston Park	II	Sheffield	Park	1875	SK 34002 87395	1001340	Weston Park
Whinfell Quarry Garden	II	Sheffield	Garden	1912	SK 31111 82729	1001431	Whinfell Quarry Garden
Wortley Hall	II	Wortley	Garden	Mid-19th century	SK 31771 99643	1000418	Wortley Hall

=== West Yorkshire ===
Name	Grade	Location	Type	Completed	Grid ref. Geo-coordinates	Entry number	Image
Armley House (Gott's Park)	II	Leeds	Park	Late 18th century	SE2625134411	1001216	Armley House (Gott's Park)
Beaumont Park	II	Huddersfield	Park	1882	SE 12752 13844	1001432	Beaumont Park
Beckett Street Cemetery	II	Leeds	Cemetery	1845	SE 31964 34615	1001605	Beckett Street Cemetery
Bowling Park	II	Bradford	Park	1880	SE 17245 31013	1001513	Bowling Park
Bramham Park	I	Aberford	Garden	1713	SE 41244 41578	1000546	Bramham Park
Bretton Hall	II	Denby Dale	Garden	Early 19th century	SE2743712428	1001217	Bretton Hall
Central Park	II	Haworth	Park	1927	SE 03273 37016	1001659	Central Park
Crow Nest Park	II	Dewsbury	Park	1893	SE 23341 21458	1001516	Crow Nest Park
Dewsbury Cemetery	II	Dewsbury	Cemetery	1860	SE 23142 21073	1001615	Dewsbury Cemetery
Friarwood Valley Gardens	II	Pontefract	Park	1954	SE 45525 21603	1001514	Friarwood Valley Gardens
Greenhead Park	II	Huddersfield	Park	1884	SE 13539 16874	1001510	Greenhead Park
Harewood House	I	Alwoodley	Garden	1851	SE 31018 41792	1001218	Harewood House
Heathcote	II	Ilkley	Garden	1911	SE 10846 47584	1001219	Heathcote
High Royds Hospital	II	Menston	Hospital grounds	1888	SE 17459 42953	1001469	High Royds Hospital
Horton Park	II	Bradford	Park	1878	SE 14903 31813	1001511	Horton Park
Hunslet Cemetery	II	Leeds	Cemetery	1845	SE 31618 30342	1001678	Hunslet Cemetery
Ilkley Memorial Gardens	II	Ilkley	Memorial garden	1922	SE1132847610	1441192	Ilkley Memorial Gardens
Kirklees Hall	II	Brighouse	Garden	Late 18th century	SE1735921955	1413828	Kirklees Hall
Lawnswood Cemetery	II	Leeds	Cemetery	1875	SE 26739 39045	1001654	Lawnswood Cemetery
Ledston Hall	II	Ledsham	Garden	1716	SE 43588 29130	1001221	Ledston Hall
Lister Lane Cemetery	II	Halifax	Cemetery	1841	SE 08427 25164	1001366	Upload Photo
Lister Park	II	Bradford	Park	1904	SE 15015 35266	1001222	Lister Park
Lotherton Hall	II	Lotherton	Garden	1920	SE 45019 35959	1001223	Lotherton Hall
Lund Park	II	Keighley	Park	1891	SE 05412 40453	1001515	Lund Park
Nostell Priory	II*	Nostell	Garden	Late 18th century	SE 40867 17670	1001224	Nostell Priory
Oulton Hall	II	Leeds	Garden	1810	SE3558827703	1000413	Oulton Hall
Parlington Estate	II	Aberford	Garden	Late 18th century	SE4187636216	1447854	Parlington Estate
Peel Park	II*	Bradford	Park	1853	SE 17115 34781	1001512	Peel Park
People's Park	II*	Halifax	Park	1857	SE 08512 24842	1000553	People's Park
Prince of Wales Park	II	Bingley	Park	1865	SE 11521 40139	1001497	Prince of Wales Park
Pudsey Cemetery	II*	Pudsey	Cemetery	1875	SE 21984 33439	1001614	Pudsey Cemetery
Roberts Park	II	Baildon	Park	1871	SE 13822 38302	1001226	Roberts Park
Roundhay Park	II	Leeds	Park	Late 19th century	SE 33368 37293	1001225	Roundhay Park
Scholemoor Cemetery	II	Bradford	Cemetery	1860	SE 13456 32554	1001576	Scholemoor Cemetery
Shibden Hall	II	Halifax	Garden	1855	SE 10800 25827	1001470	Shibden Hall
Shroggs Park	II	Halifax	Park	1881	SE 08234 26130	1001557	Shroggs Park
St Ives Estate	II	Bingley	Garden	1840s	SE 09190 38513	1001707	St Ives Estate
Stoney Royd Cemetery	II	Halifax	Cemetery	1861	SE 09966 24181	1001683	Stoney Royd Cemetery
Temple Newsam	II	Leeds	Garden	1760s	SE3592332131	1001356	Temple Newsam
Thornes Park	II	Wakefield	Park	1891	SE3246919700	1403469	Thornes Park
Undercliffe Cemetery	II*	Bradford	Cemetery	1854	SE 17373 34245	1001387	Undercliffe Cemetery
Utley Cemetery	II	Keighley	Cemetery	1857	SE0578042654	1404586	Utley Cemetery
West View Park	II	Halifax	Park	1896	SE 06973 24901	1001509	West View Park
Whinburn	II	Keighley	Garden	1938	SE 04848 42656	1001643	Upload Photo
York Gate Gardens	II	Adel	Garden	1980s	SE2770340242	1467139	York Gate Gardens
