= Plumpton =

Plumpton may refer to:

== Places ==
=== Places in Australia ===
- Plumpton, New South Wales, suburb of Sydney
- Plumpton, Victoria, suburb of Melbourne

=== Places in England ===
- Plumpton, Cumbria, village
- Plumpton, Lancashire (Great Plumpton and Little Plumpton)
- Plumpton, Northamptonshire
- Plumpton, East Sussex, village and civil parish
  - Plumpton College, a college of further education
  - Plumpton Place, an Elizabethan manor house
  - Plumpton Racecourse, a National Hunt racecourse
  - Plumpton railway station
- Plumpton, a historic spelling of Plompton, North Yorkshire
  - Plumpton Rocks, a rock formation

== Sport ==
- Plumpton Racecourse, a National Hunt horse-racing course, at Plumpton, East Sussex
- plumpton (greyhound racing), Australian term for an enclosed greyhound track

== People with surname Plumpton ==
- Ben Plumpton (born 1998), Maltese water polo player
- Diana Plumpton (1911–1973), English golfer
- Sir William Plumpton (1404–1480), English aristocrat, landowner and administrator

== Other ==
- HMS Plumpton, a British Racecourse class minesweeper of the early 20th century
