= Culloden Tower =

1746 folly in North Yorkshire, England

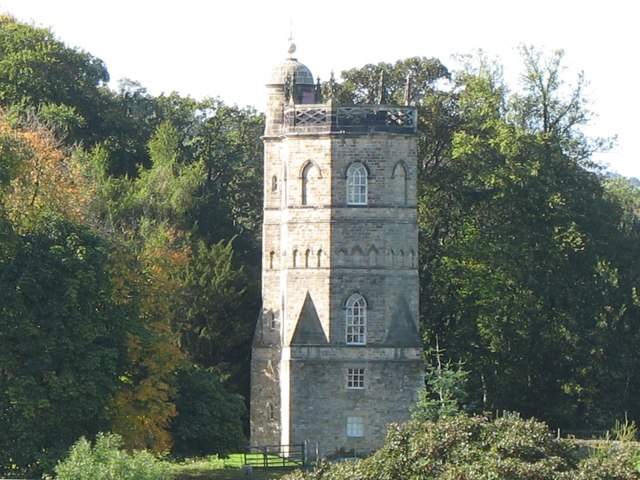
Culloden Tower, Richmond

The Culloden Tower was built as a parkland ornament or folly in about 1746 on the estate of John Yorke MP, at Richmond, North Yorkshire. It was built on the site of an earlier pele tower, the remains of which possibly form the rectangular base. It is also known as The Temple or The Cumberland Temple, in celebration of the victorious Duke of Cumberland's army over the forces of the pretender Prince Charles Edward Stuart at the battle of Culloden in 1746. The estate is now known as Temple Grounds.

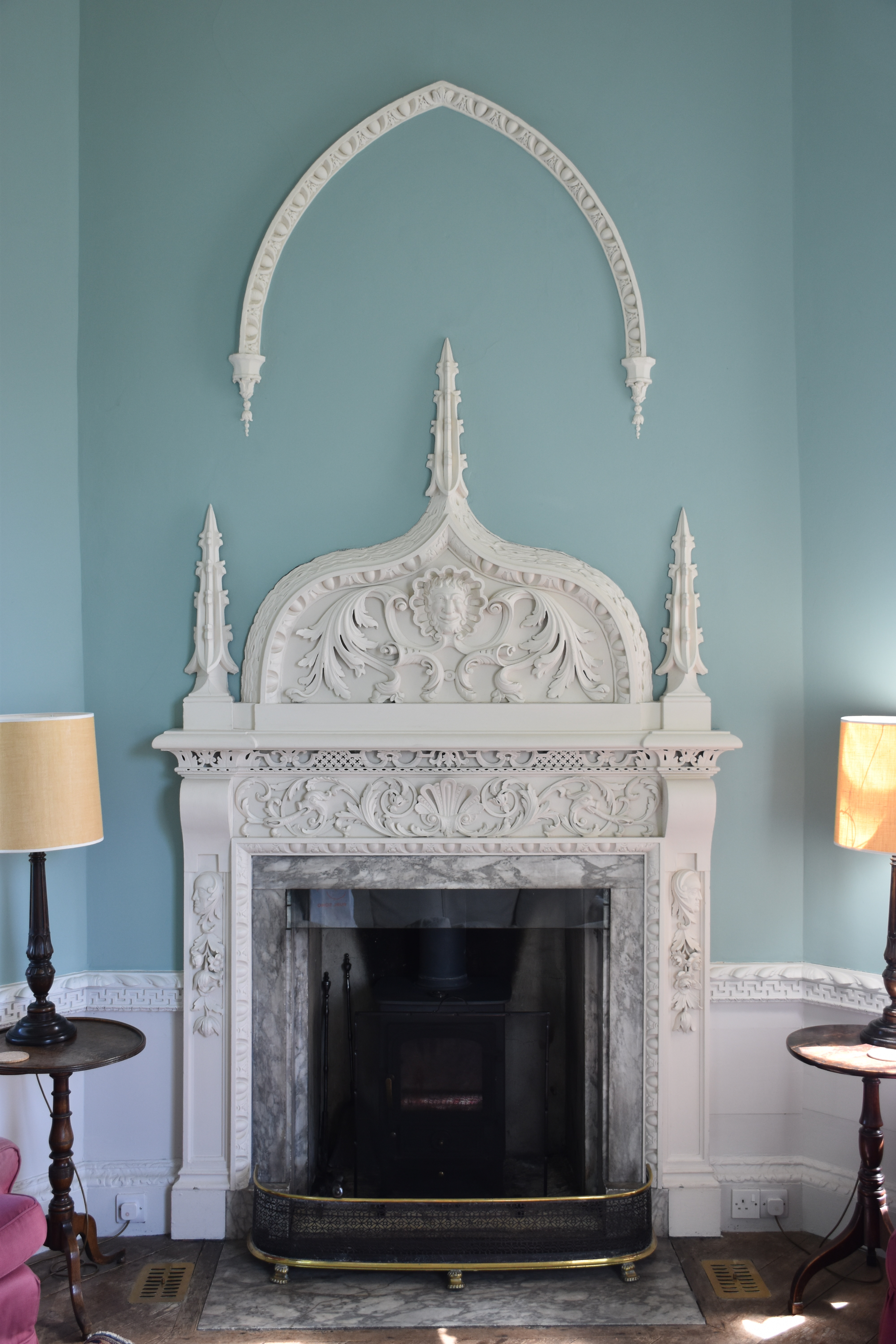
The "glorious chimneypiece" in the living room

The tower was most probably designed by Daniel Garrett and comprises four storeys and a roof terrace linked by a small spiral staircase. The estate, comprising Yorke House, was demolished in 1823, and the remaining buildings and parklands, including the tower, became part of Temple View. The isolated position of the tower meant that it was used less and less, and was increasingly subject to vandalism and theft. The tower was saved in 1981 by the Landmark Trust, who undertook a full restoration of the property. It is currently available as a holiday let.

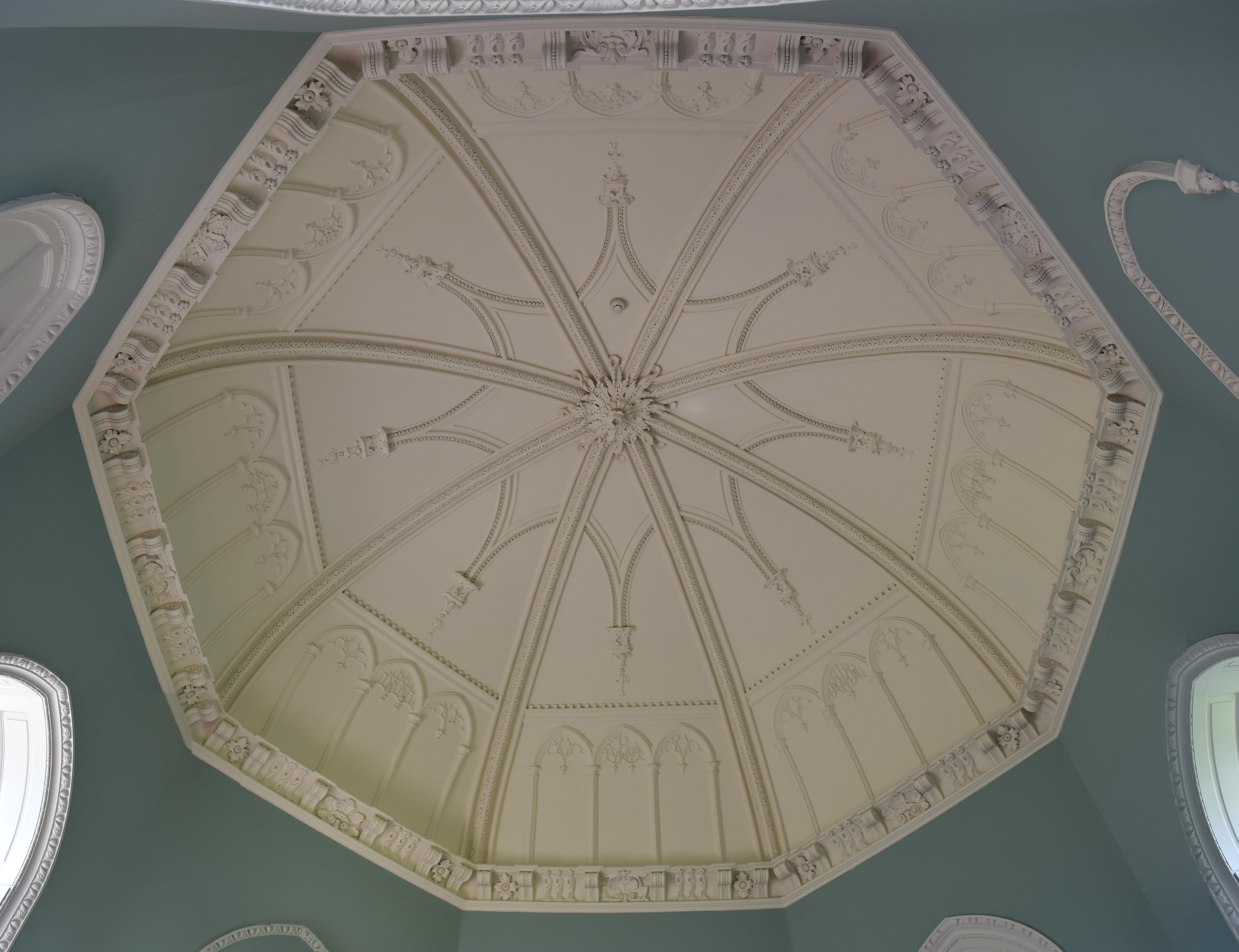
Plaster domed ceiling in the living room

The tower is octagonal on a square base, with a staircase projecting on the west side. The windows are pointed, and there is a band of blind ogee arches between the first and second floor windows. Inside there are two main rooms, each occupying a whole floor, and thus octagonal. The first floor room has rich Gothick ornamentation, in particular the chimneypiece. The room has a domed plaster vault. The second floor room is more classical in its detail.

== See also ==
- Grade II* listed buildings in North Yorkshire (district)
- Listed buildings in Richmond, North Yorkshire
