= Temple Grounds =

Park in Richmond, North Yorkshire, England

Coordinates: 54°24′08″N 1°44′42″W

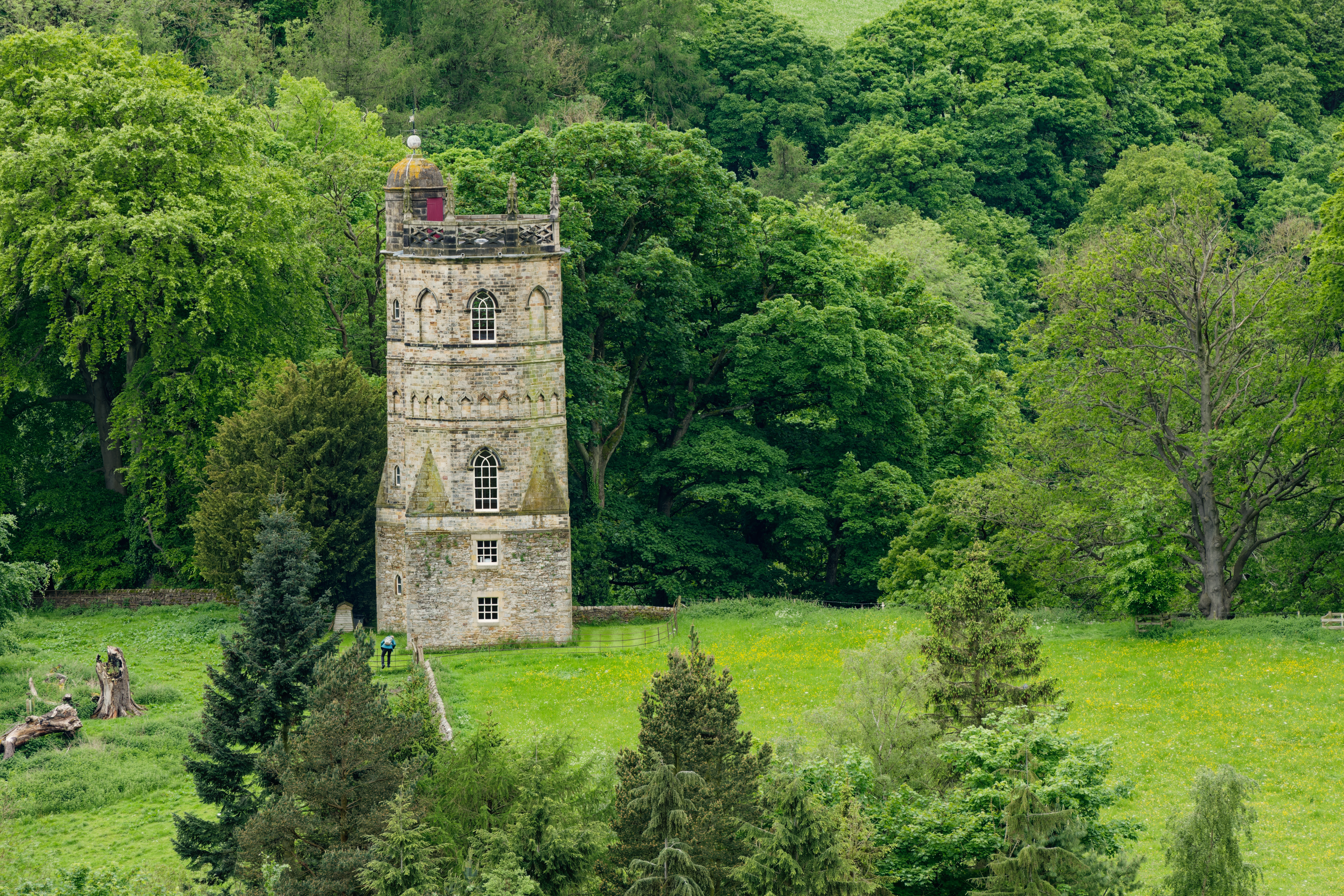
Culloden Tower in the grounds

The Temple Grounds are a historic park in Richmond, North Yorkshire, a town in England.

A house known as "The Green" was built at the west end of Richmond, on the bank of the River Swale, in the early 17th century. It was purchased in 1631 or 1632 by Maulger Norton, and then in 1651 by John Yorke, the house becoming known as "Yorke House". Formal gardens were laid out in the late 17th century, of which some earthworks survive. The parkland was developed in the 18th century, the work including several garden buildings, of which Culloden Tower survives. The property was sold by the York family in 1824, and Yorke House was then demolished. The Menagerie, one of the garden buildings, was converted to become the main house.

The gardens occupy a steeply-sloping 15-hectare site with two entrances from Cravengate - the principal, north, entrance with a listed gateway, and the southern entrance which now provides access to Culloden Tower. The highest point is covered by Mill Bank Wood, planted as a pleasure ground with terraced walks, four grottos, and a now-demolished summer house on the peak. The remainder of the site is a mixture of lawns, pasture, hay meadow, and woodland. The grounds were painted by J. M. W. Turner. They were grade II listed in 1994.

== Temple Lodge ==
Temple Lodge, the former Menagerie, was built in 1769, and enlarged in the 1820s to become the main house. It is built of stone, with an embattled parapet and a Welsh slate roof. It has two storeys, a main range, and five-bay wings with arcades on quatrefoil piers. The windows are sashes, most with ogee heads. The building was grade II listed in 1952.

== North Gate ==
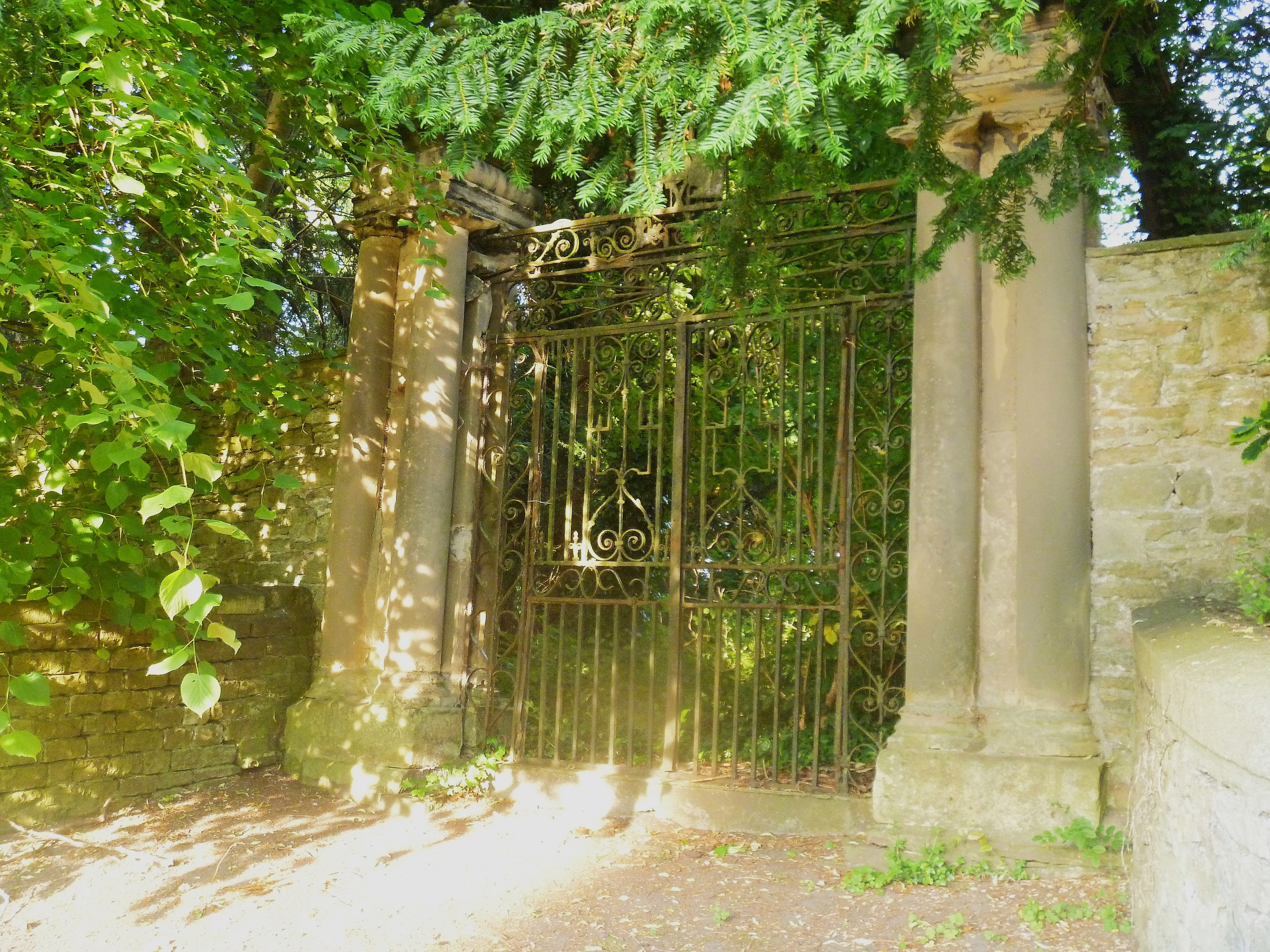
The North Gate

The North Gate probably dates from the 1730s. The ornamental gates and the overthrow, which contains coats of arms, are in wrought iron. The gates are hung from ironwork pilasters on the gate piers. The piers, possibly designed by Daniel Garrett, are in stone and have four engaged columns, an entablature with an architrave, a pulvinated frieze, and a dentilled cornice, and are surmounted by a pineapple finial on a stepped pedestal. The whole structure is grade II* listed, and is described by Historic England as a "very clever example of the use of forced perspective for architectural effect".

== See also ==
- Grade II* listed buildings in North Yorkshire (district)
- Listed buildings in Richmond, North Yorkshire (north and outer areas)
- Listed parks and gardens in Yorkshire and the Humber
