= Listed buildings in Plompton =

Plompton is a civil parish in the county of North Yorkshire, England. It contains 18 listed buildings that are recorded in the National Heritage List for England. Of these, two are listed at Grade II*, the middle of the three grades, and the others are at Grade II, the lowest grade. The parish contains the pleasure gardens of Plompton Rocks, and there are two listed buildings within it, a boathouse and a dam. The most important buildings in the parish are Plompton Hall and its stables, which are both listed, together with other buildings and structures in the gardens and grounds. The rest of the listed buildings include farmhouses and farm buildings, and a milepost.

== Key ==
Grade	Criteria
II*	Particularly important buildings of more than special interest
II	Buildings of national importance and special interest

== Buildings ==
Name and location	Photograph	Date	Notes	Grade
Boathouse, Plompton Rocks; 53.97838°N 1.45916°W		1755–76	The boathouse was designed by John Carr. It is cut into rock, and built from gritstone blocks and natural outcrop. It has a rectangular plan, and a narrow entrance on the north. At the entrance to the water is a shallow arch with a rusticated keystone and voussoirs. Inside, the roof consists of a barrel vault of dressed gritstone blocks.	II
Dam, Plompton Rocks; 53.97749°N 1.45973°W		1755–76	The dam was designed by John Carr, and is in gritstone with extensive rustication. It contains a central round-arched recess, buttresses with banded rustication, two with banded ball finials, walls containing smaller arched recesses with keystones and voussoirs, and stone-lined channels.	II
Stables, Plompton Hall; 53.98099°N 1.45719°W		c. 1757	The stable block, later used for other purposes, was designed by John Carr. It is in stone with a stone slate roof, and consists of three two-storey ranges around a courtyard. The main range is the west range, which has rusticated quoins, and seven bays. The middle bay projects slightly, and contains a tall archway with a rusticated surround, an open triangular pediment, and an octagonal cupola with clock faces, dentilled eaves and a ball finial with a moulded base. The flanking bays have impost bands, a moulded eaves cornice, and a hipped roof, and contain engaged arcading with windows.	II*
Small building west of the stables, Plompton Hall; 53.98116°N 1.45771°W	—	c. 1757	The building is in stone, with a pyramidal stone slate roof, and a square plan. The south front has a plinth, a doorway, a band, a moulded eaves cornice, and a parapet, and the other fronts each contains an arched recess.	II
Plompton Hall and walls 53.98090°N 1.45685°W		c. 1760	A country house in stone, with rusticated quoins, an eaves cornice, and a hipped stone slate roof. There are two storeys and three bays, the middle bay projecting under a pediment. In the centre is a full-height recessed round arch with voussoirs and an impost band. This contains a doorway with sidelights, above which is a window with a semicircular wrought iron balcony. Flanking the doorway are round-headed niches and semicircular niches above. The outer bays contain windows, blind in the ground floor and sashes above. At the rear is a canted bay window. Short flanking walls, about 3 metres (9.8 ft) high, link the house with the stables, the left wall with three ball and cushion finials.	II*
Lodges and gate piers, Plompton Hall; 53.97626°N 1.45852°W		c. 1760	The lodges flanking the entrance to the drive are in gritstone and have Westmorland slate roofs. Each lodge has one storey and one bay, and a single-bay extension, and each has a doorway facing the drive, and sash windows. The roofs are hipped, apart from the extension to the west lodge. The gate piers are attached to the lodges by a short wall, and have a square plan and shallow pyramidal caps.	II
Plompton Hall Farmhouse; 53.98146°N 1.45711°W	—	c. 1760	The house is in sandstone, with floor and eaves bands, and stone slate roof. There are two storeys, a central block with three bays and a pyramidal roof, and lower single-bay wings with hipped roofs. On the north front, the middle block has a doorway with a circular window above in an arched recess, and fixed windows, and in the wings are sash windows. The south front has a Diocletian window, a doorway, bay windows, and sash windows with keystones.	II
Barn and outbuildings, Plompton Hall Farmhouse; 53.98188°N 1.45694°W		c. 1760	The buildings are in red brick and gritstone with Westmorland slate roofs. They form a U-shaped plan, consisting of a two-storey north range, and single-storey ranges enclosing a south-facing yard. The north range has seven bays, the central bay taller with a hipped roof, containing a segmental cart entrance and a dovecote in a circular recess above. The west range has seven bays and contains an open animal shelter and closed sheds. The east range contains an animal shelter of 16 bays with sandstone columns, and four bays with closed sheds.	II
Cartshed north of Plompton Hall Farmhouse; 53.98180°N 1.45725°W	—	c. 1760	The cart shed with storage above is in gritstone with a hipped Westmorland slate roof. There are two storeys and five bays. The openings include doorways and windows, and three shallow segmental arches with voussoirs.	II
Pier north of stables west range 53.98116°N 1.45726°W	—	c. 1760	The pier is in stone, and has a square section. It is about 4 metres (13 ft) in height, and has a slight plinth, a deep cornice, and a ball finial.	II
Wall south of Plompton Hall Stables; 53.98080°N 1.45713°W	—	c. 1760	The wall attached to the south of the west range of the stables is in stone with flat coping. It has a slight plinth, six pilasters, and a pier with a cornice. To the right of the pier is a doorway with a lintel and a keystone.	II
Wall between Plompton Hall Stables and Farmhouse; 53.98132°N 1.45725°W	—	c. 1760	The wall is in stone with flat coping. It has a slight plinth, six pilasters, and a pier with a cornice and a ball finial. To the right of the pier is a doorway with a lintel and a keystone.	II
Plompton High Grange; 53.97824°N 1.44974°W		1760	A farmhouse and barn designed by John Carr and later used for other purposes, it is in pink gritstone with a stone slate roof. The main block has two storeys and three bays, flanked by projecting single-bay wings, to its left is a two-storey three-bay extension, and further to the left is the gable end of the former barn. The main block has quoins, a convex floor band, a dentilled eaves cornice and blocking course, and a hipped roof, and it contains sash windows. The gable end has an embattled parapet.	II
Wingate Farmhouse; 53.97915°N 1.46871°W	—	Mid to late 18th century	The farmhouse is in gritstone, and has a Westmorland slate roof with kneelers and stone gable coping. There are two storeys and four bays. The doorway has an architrave, and the windows are sashes, some horizontally sliding.	II
Outbuilding, barn and wheel-house, Wingate Farm; 53.97914°N 1.46907°W	—	Mid to late 18th century	The farm buildings are in gritstone with stone slate roofs, and form an L-shaped plan. The outbuilding contains a small segmental-headed cart entrance, and a doorway. The barn at right angles contains a large segmental-headed cart entrance with voussoirs, and vents. The wheel-house has brick piers, and a pentagonal hipped pantile roof.	II
Garden walls, Plompton Hall; 53.98142°N 1.45485°W	—	Late 18th century	The walls enclosing the former garden are in red brick with stone coping. The north wall is about 6 metres (20 ft) in height with buttresses, the east wall is about 1.5 metres (4 ft 11 in) in height, also with buttresses, and the south wall is about 4 metres (13 ft) in height. At the east end is a narrow gateway, and an archway links the north wall to the farm buildings.	II
Stile and wall, Plompton Square; 53.97616°N 1.45688°W	—	Late 18th century (probable)	The stile and wall are in gritstone. The wall is about 1.2 metres (3 ft 11 in) in height, with flat coping, and the listed part extends for about 5 metres (16 ft). The stile is built into each side of the wall, and is about 60 centimetres (24 in) in height, and consists of four steps and a square platform.	II
Mile post 53.98904°N 1.43124°W		19th century	The milepost is on the east side of Wetherby Road (B6164 road). It is in gritstone with a cast iron plate, and has a triangular plan and a rounded top. On the top is inscribed "KNARESBORO & WETHERBY ROAD" on the left face is the distance to Wetherby, and on the right face to Knaresborough.	II
