= Plompton Hall =

Building in Plompton, North Yorkshire, England

Coordinates: 53°58′51″N 1°27′25″W

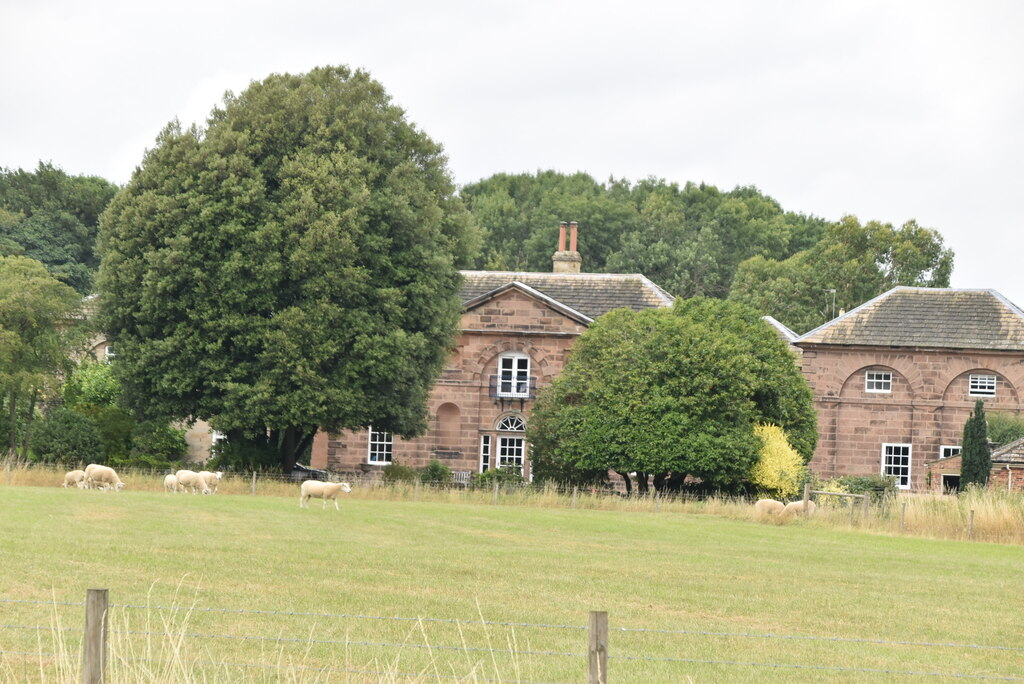
The hall, in 2022

Plompton Hall is a historic building in Plompton, a village in North Yorkshire, in England.

The Plompton estate was purchased by Daniel Lascelles in about 1755. He commissioned John Carr to rebuild the country house, with work starting in about 1757. However, Lascelles later bought Goldsborough Hall and decided to live there. In 1762, he had the unfinished house at Plompton demolished. The stable block, perhaps modelled on the one at Houghton Hall, was retained, with part of it converted to form a smaller house, now known as Plompton Hall. Both the house and the remaining part of the stables were altered in the 20th century, and in about 1980 the southern part of the stables was converted into a further house. Plompton Hall and its stables are separately grade II* listed.

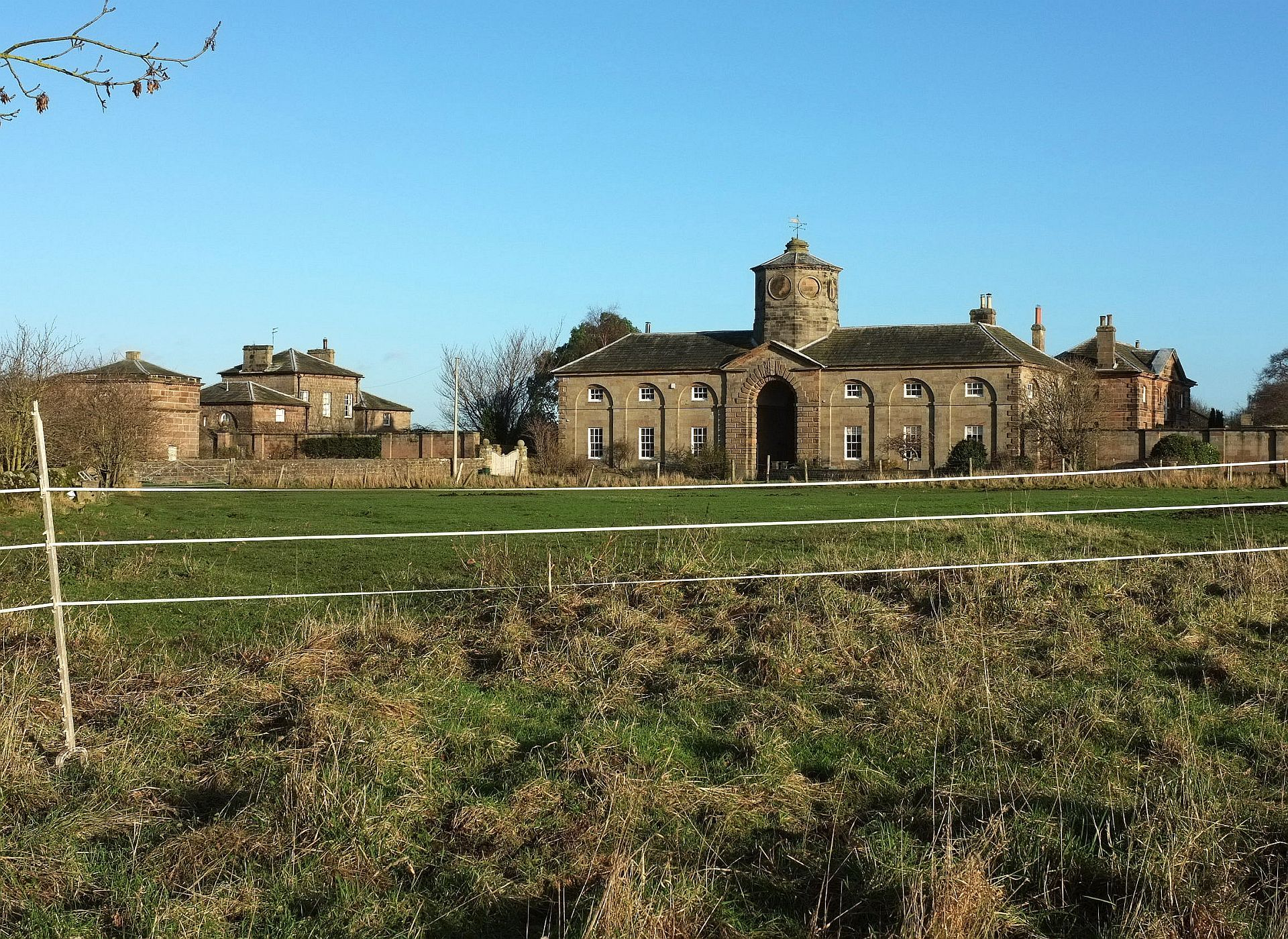
The stables

The house has rusticated quoins, an eaves cornice, and a hipped stone slate roof. It has two storeys and three bays, the middle bay projecting under a pediment. In the centre is a full-height recessed round arch with voussoirs and an impost band. This contains a doorway with sidelights, above which is a window with a semicircular wrought iron balcony. Flanking the doorway are round-headed niches and semicircular niches above. The outer bays contain windows, blind in the ground floor and sashes above. At the rear is a canted bay window. Short flanking walls, about 3 metres (9.8 ft) high, link the house with the stables, the left wall with three ball and cushion finials.

The stable block is built of stone with a stone slate roof, and consists of three two-storey ranges around a courtyard. The main range is the west range, which has rusticated quoins, and seven bays. The middle bay projects slightly, and contains a tall archway with a rusticated surround, an open triangular pediment, and an octagonal cupola with clock faces, dentilled eaves and a ball finial with a moulded base. The flanking bays have impost bands, a moulded eaves cornice, and a hipped roof, and contain engaged arcading with windows. The east range has five lower bays, with taller bays at each end. The north range is a three-bay hay barn. In the courtyard, there is a dog kennel in the northwest corner, and a carriage house in the northeast corner.

== See also ==
- Grade II* listed buildings in North Yorkshire (district)
- Listed buildings in Plompton
