= St Nicholas, Richmond =

House in Richmond, North Yorkshire, England

Coordinates: 54.4049°N 1.7267°W

St Nicholas is a historic building in Richmond, North Yorkshire, a town in England.

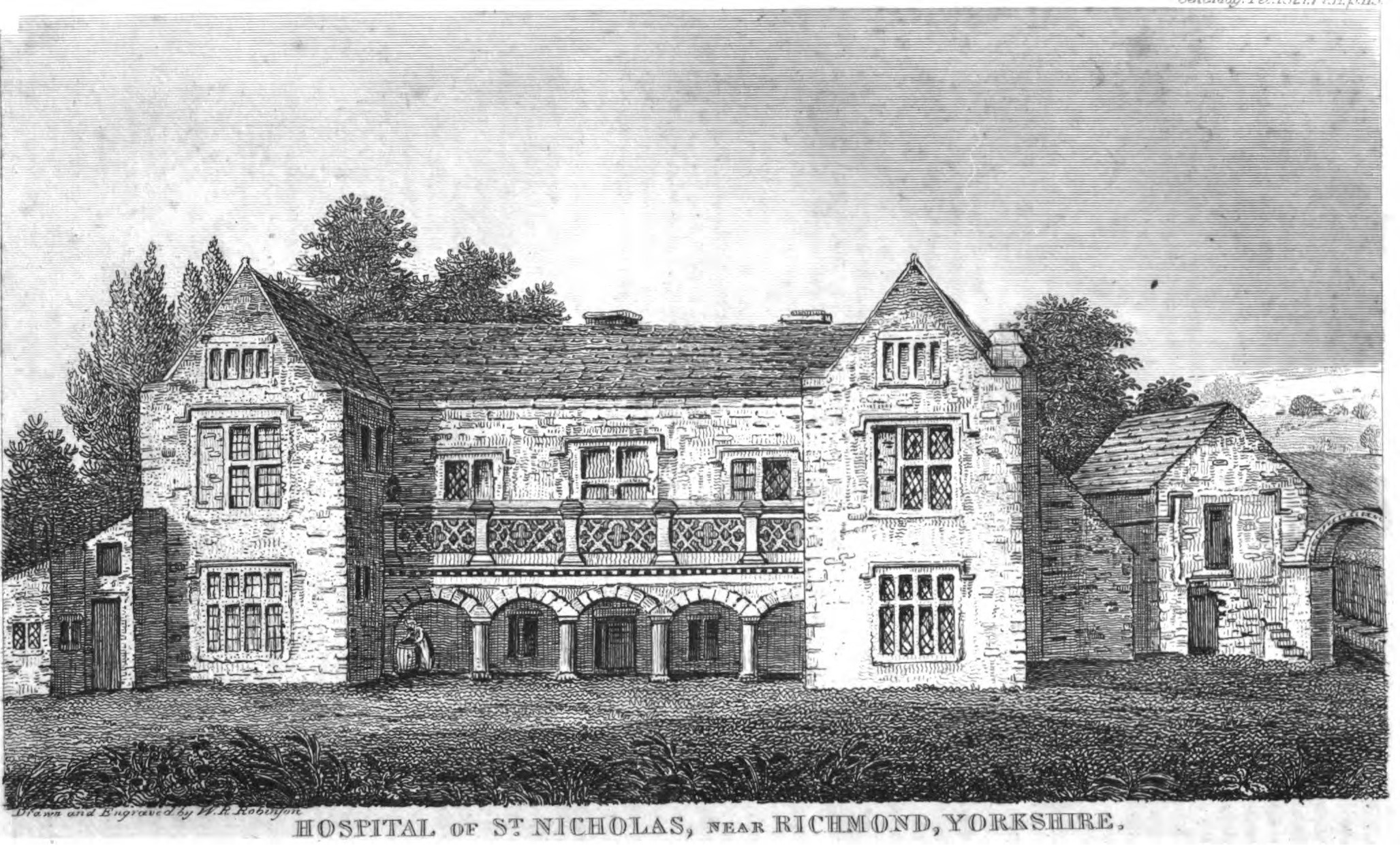
Building in 1894

The Benedictines founded a hospital in Richmond, by 1171. In 1448, it passed to William Ayscough, who restored the buildings, and added a chantry chapel. This was dissolved in the 1540s, re-established in 1553 but then sold in 1585. Perhaps at this time, a small building was constructed on the site, and in the 17th century this and the hospital gateway were incorporated into a new house. The building was restored in the 1810s by Ignatius Bonomi, and was altered and extended in the early 20th century. Between 1905 and 1925, Robert James laid out gardens, which are now grade II listed, and the house is also listed at grade II. In 2000, the property was purchased by Keith Schellenberg, who restored the house and gardens.

The house is built of stone with quoins, a parapet and a stone slate roof. There are two storeys and an H-shaped plan, with a main range of three bays and projecting gabled single-bay cross-wings. In front of the main range is a colonnade of Tuscan columns and four-centred arches, above which is an openwork parapet. The windows are mullioned and transomed with hood moulds. To the right is a kitchen extension incorporating a medieval hospital gateway. Nikolaus Pevsner described the style of the house as "a very early stage of C19 Tudor".

The 3-hectare (7.4-acre) gardens are entered through an iron gateway, flanked by yew hedges. They are broadly in the arts and crafts style, and comprise a formal garden, rock garden and Field Walk to the east of the house; a walled area with a cottage garden, nursery and greenhouse; and an orchard, tennis court and kitchen garden to the west of the house.

== See also ==
- Listed buildings in Richmond, North Yorkshire (north and outer areas)
- Listed parks and gardens in Yorkshire and the Humber
