= Keith Schellenberg =

British businessman and Winter Olympian (1929–2019)

Personal information
- Full name: Clifford Keith Wain Schellenberg
- Nationality: British
- Born: 13 March 1929 Middlesbrough, England
- Died: 28 October 2019 (aged 90) Richmond, North Yorkshire, England

Sport
- Sport: Bobsleigh

Clifford Keith Wain Schellenberg (13 March 1929 – 28 October 2019) was a British businessman and Winter Olympian. He was known for his legal disputes related to his ownership of the Scottish island of Eigg. He also stood in several general elections as a Liberal Party candidate.

== Personal life and business career ==
Clifford Keith Wain Schellenberg was the son of Clifford Robertshaw Schellenberg (1898–1971), of Woodlands, The Grove, Marton-in-Cleveland, Yorkshire. His distant forebears, who hailed from Wurttemberg in Germany, settled in Britain in the 1860s. His grandfather, Alan Schellenberg, had founded Cleveland Products in Middlesbrough, which produced glue and ossein gelatin – used, among other things, in the development of reconnaissance photography during World War II, thus enhancing the family's prosperity. Aside from the Middlesbrough glue factory, Schellenberg's own business interests lay in shipbuilding, livestock feed and agricultural chemicals. From the 1970s until his death he was the owner of Cleveland and Highland Holdings Ltd., a cattle company with dealings in both northern Scotland and Teesside. He was also the proprietor of a Middlesbrough-based Ford dealership network after purchasing the parent company, Nesham's, in 1961.

Schellenberg attended Oundle School in Northamptonshire. He became a vegetarian at a young age after witnessing a friend kill a water rat with a catapult. He had six children and was married four times; firstly, in 1957, to Jan Hagenbach, with whom he had two daughters; secondly, in 1964, to Margaret de Hauteville Hamilton, daughter of Robert Hamilton-Udny, 11th Lord Belhaven and Stenton, by whom he had a son and two daughters; thirdly, to garden designer Susan "Suki" Minette Urquhart (1944–2014), daughter of Major-General Robert Urquhart, General officer commanding the 1st Airborne Division at the Battle of Arnhem during Operation Market Garden in 1944; and lastly to Jilly Miller, who survived him. His daughter Serena is a film producer associated with Extinction Rebellion.

Schellenberg previously lived at Davidstone House, near Keith, Aberdeenshire, and at Old Mayen on the River Deveron. He moved to St Nicholas, a house in Richmond, North Yorkshire, in 2000, and restored the property. He died in the town in October 2019 at the age of 90.

== Lairdship of Eigg ==
Schellenberg bought the Hebridean island of Eigg in 1975 from its owner Bernard Farnham-Smith for £274,000, outbidding the £200,000 offered by the Highlands and Islands Development Board. He saw this as a triumph for free enterprise over state capitalism, but his motives were not purely personal: keen to preserve the island's natural state, in the first years of his lairdship he invested in conservation projects, signing an agreement with the Scottish Wildlife Trust in 1978 which gave it the right to manage three nature reserves for 25 years. Wishing to encourage young families to relocate to Eigg, he made efforts to revitalise the island's economy by encouraging tourism, restoring derelict properties and establishing a daily ferry service to the mainland using his boat, Eilean Ban Mora. By 1979, the island's population was said to have doubled from 39 in 1974 to 82, including 21 children.

However, although Schellenberg was genuine in his desire to improve the island's welfare, his activities were often autocratic and somewhat Luddite in nature, dedicated to preserving what he saw as an isolated and unspoiled idyll. As he admitted in 1988:

I hate modern things... Fax machines and helicopters have no use on Eigg. I drive a 1920 estate car and am proud that we hardly have electric lights. They might work in four rooms, but we use oil lamps for the rest.

His aversion to the modern world extended to elements of the past, as demonstrated by his decision to ban shooting and hunting (he later described conserving wildlife as "the most important of his objectives"). All of this rankled with many on the island, who criticised Schellenberg for letting his sense of noblesse oblige curdle into excessive paternalism and neo-feudalism. Although other inhabitants remained supportive of his efforts, as early as 1979 a BBC television programme, Who'd Own an Island, chronicled the whispering unease that had begun to emerge within the community over Schellenberg's obstructive behaviour and his open disregard for their concerns. Over the next 15 years, islanders complained of being unable to acquire long-term leases to their properties and were frequently prevented from improving them. Others found themselves in precarious employment or out of work entirely as several of Schellenberg's enterprises, such as a "crafts complex", floundered and were eventually abandoned after failing to turn a profit.

Having been left short of capital following a costly divorce from his second wife, Schellenberg was forced by her (through the courts) to sell the island in 1992. A heritage trust had earlier been established to launch a buyout, backed by three-quarters of Eigg's population, but it failed to raise the necessary funds in time as Cleveland and Highland Holdings Ltd. – owned by Schellenberg, who had never wanted to sell in the first place – purchased the island for £1 million. By now the press had started to pay closer attention, and a flurry of lurid news reports soon followed documenting the behaviour of a laird who started bonfires atop An Sgùrr and held ostentatious parties and games for his rich friends. Matters came to a head in January 1994 when two sheds on Eigg pier were set ablaze by persons unknown, destroying canoes, dinghies and, crucially, Schellenberg's 1927 ten-seater Mark I Rolls-Royce Phantom. Blaming "barmy revolutionaries", "Reds" and "hippies" for his downfall – whom he espied among the incomers to the island, not the natives – he sold Eigg once more, this time for £1.5 million, to a "fire-worshipping" German artist named Marlin Eckhard Maruma, whose bankruptcy soon afterwards finally allowed the island's heritage trust to buy it for the same price in 1997.

=== Libel action ===
In 1999, Schellenberg took The Guardian and The Sunday Times newspapers to the High Court of Justice over their coverage of the whole affair, taking particular umbrage at a Guardian article headed 'Lairds of Misrule', which he alleged falsely portrayed him as a "playboy" who left behind a "legacy of ruin and disintegration". During cross-examination by Nicholas Stadlen QC, Schellenberg had to deny dressing up as a Nazi for a spoof Christmas card but admitted sending another card to tenants which implied that they were to be evicted from their homes. The prosecution also brought evidence from islanders describing their squalid living conditions; one witness memorably recalled having to drown rats in her sink. An employee at the housing charity Shelter, who had conducted a survey of properties on the island in 1986, informed the court that conditions there were the worst he had ever seen. Although there was also testimony in favour of Schellenberg, he eventually abandoned his libel action and agreed to pay £300,000 in costs, protesting that a combination of rising total costs and the length of court proceedings had forced him to admit defeat.

== Politics ==
Schellenberg was an individualist classical liberal with an "unpredictable" radical streak, who combined a dislike of both onerous government taxation and bohemian counterculture with socially progressive stances such as support for animal rights and opposition to cigarette advertising.

In the run up to the 1964 general election, having hitherto shown little active interest in politics, Schellenberg applied to be the Liberal candidate for Richmond, a rural Yorkshire constituency in close proximity to his birthplace in Middlesbrough. The future Liberal MP Michael Meadowcroft, then a young activist at party headquarters in London, remembers him arriving there without invitation and declaring that he was going to be Richmond's next candidate. Although he had not been interviewed beforehand by the local constituency association, he was soon "fast-tracked through the processes" and fought an energetic campaign, making numerous personal appearances with his mobile office, a caravan pulled by a 1930 eight-litre Bentley, in tow. During the campaign, Schellenberg claimed that he was short of money and could not find a committee room in Northallerton because "the owners are frightened that to let one to me would hurt their businesses." Although popular on the stump, he was unable to sufficiently swim against the tide (only nine Liberals were elected that year) and came third behind the sitting Conservative MP, Timothy Kitson.

Returning to challenge for the seat in 1966, Schellenberg once more faced Kitson, an "old chum" who apparently believed that Schellenberg was only standing "to annoy him". Although the Liberals nationwide did slightly better than last time, at least in terms of seats won, Schellenberg went backwards, losing approximately 2 per cent of his previous vote and seeing the gap widen between himself and the second-placed Labour candidate. Moving to north-eastern Scotland in the early 1970s, he chose to fight his third election campaign in Moray and Nairn at the October 1974 general election. Unlike Richmond, which was a solid Conservative seat, Moray and Nairn was at that time held by the Scottish National Party (SNP) MP Winnie Ewing, who maintained a slender majority of 1,817 over the Tories. She thus captured much of the anti-Conservative vote, leaving Schellenberg to trail in fourth place at under 10 per cent of the poll. He never stood for political office again.

== Winter Olympics and sporting endeavours ==
Schellenberg competed in the two-man and the four-man Bobsleigh events at the 1956 Winter Olympics. He subsequently took part in the men's singles in the luge at the 1964 Winter Olympics, coming in 25th place overall. When years later two of his high-speed racing toboggans were stolen from his home in Richmond, Schellenberg remarked: "In 1964, I was the only member of the British team to finish the course – one man ended up in hospital and the other in the mortuary. Let that be a lesson to these people." (Gordon Porteous retired mid-way through the competition after suffering from a "heavy cold", while Kazimierz Kay-Skrzypecki died following a training accident before the Games began.)

Schellenberg also played rugby union for Middlesbrough RUFC and captained the Yorkshire first XV, at a time when the squad included Phil Horrocks-Taylor and Jeff Butterfield. In 1968 he competed in the London to Sydney Marathon in his vintage Bentley, retiring when the car – having nearly reached Erzincan, in Turkey – toppled off the edge of the road, which had subsided under the car's heavy weight.

== Powerboat Racing ==
Keith Schellenberg’s love for motor racing and speed spilled over to offshore racing in 1963 when he entered a Bertram hull, ‘Glass Moppie’, in the Cowes-Torquay race for the first time, where he finished in second place behind the more experienced Sonny Levi.

Schellenberg continued racing throughout the sixties without further success on board ‘Blue Moppie’ and ‘Thunderstreak’. In 1969 he entered the Round Britain race with ‘Botany Bay Express’; however, he was disqualified for having difficulty obtaining radio crystals. He had asked and been given permission for late arrival to find the crystals, but when he turned up for a scrutineering test he was disqualified out of hand without discussion by the Race Committee.

Schellenberg competed in another Round Britain race in 1984 and came out of retirement for the 2008 Cowes-Torquay-Cowes race at the age of 78. This proved to be a successful race, as he finished second in Class and 17th overall in a Cougar US-1 monohull, ‘Yellow Drama’.
