= John Hebden =

English composer (1712–1765)

John Hebden (1712–1765) was a composer and musician in 18th century Great Britain.

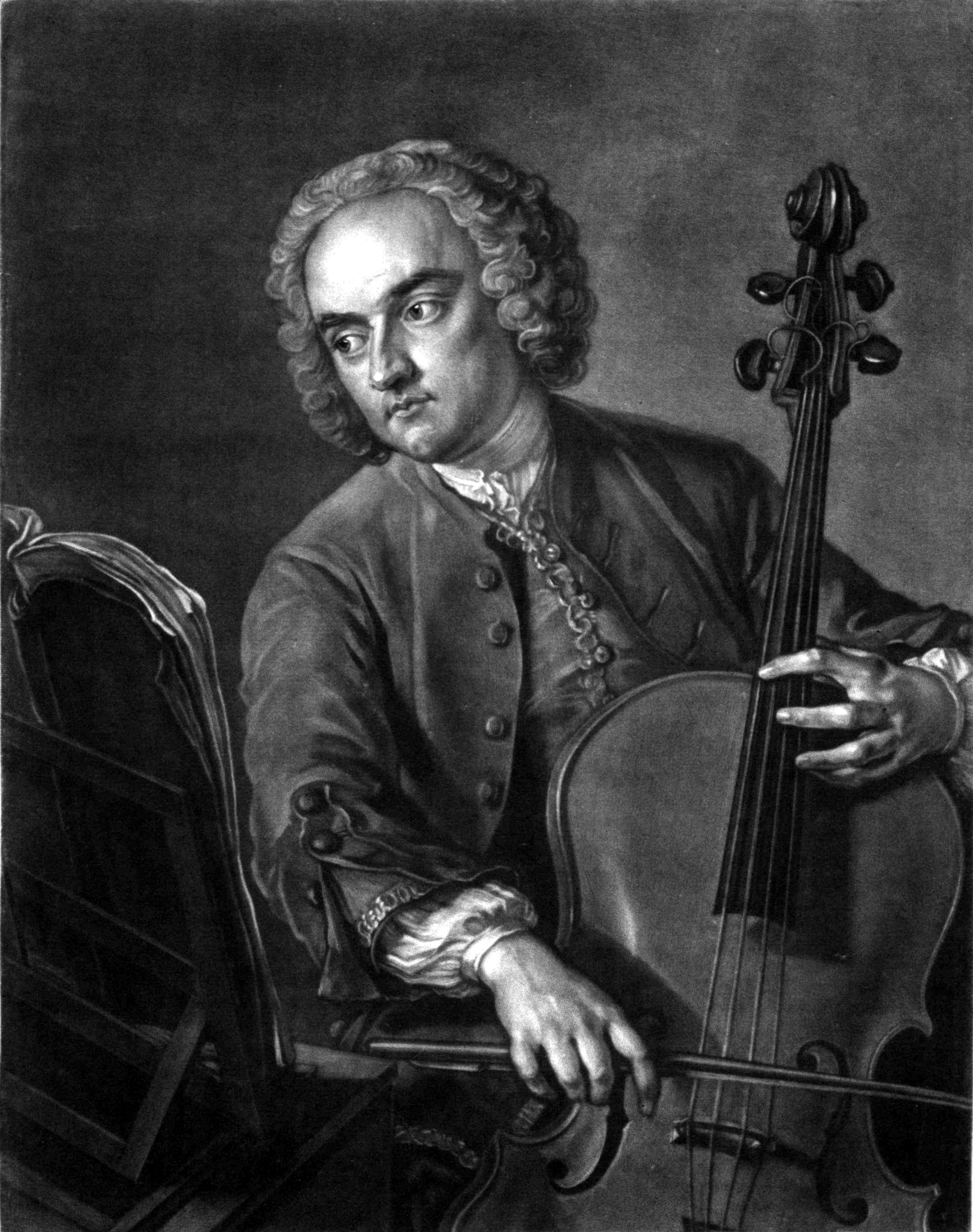
John Hebden. An engraving from a portrait by Philippe Mercier, c. 1740-01.

Little is known of Hebden's life. He was baptized on 21 July 1712 at Spofforth, near Harrogate in Yorkshire, the son of 'John Hebdin' of Plompton. He was orphaned when young but was fortunate enough to receive an excellent education, including musical tuition.

He lived most of his life in York. In 1732, he married Mary Prestland. Their first son, John, born in 1733, survived only a short time. A second son was baptized in 1736, but Mary died shortly afterwards, in 1737. Hebden was left with the responsibility of bringing up his small son and working long hours earning enough to live. When Hebden was dying, he arranged for money to be left in trust for his son, to be released in only small amounts.

Around 1742, Hebden moved to London, and when composer Thomas Arne enlarged the orchestra at Vauxhall Gardens in 1745, he became the principal cellist and bassoonist. It is also known that he played in a performance of Messiah directed by George Frideric Handel himself, to raise money for the Foundling Hospital.

Hebden was principally an orchestral player and as such his social status and his income would have been low. He might, had he chosen, have supplemented his income considerably by composing popular songs, as did a number of his fellow musicians. Hebden was a professional bassoonist, gamba (viol) player and cellist and, in the 1730s, composed music for a small local professional orchestra containing "all the best Hands in Town." They gave many concerts at the York Assembly Rooms, which were designed by Richard Boyle, 3rd Earl of Burlington who was a patron to Handel.

It appears that Hebden had greater aspirations for his talent and channeled his creativity in a highly disciplined manner into more serious works. Only two were published: Six Solos for German Flute and the Six Concertos for Strings.

The latter were probably begun around 1745 and published in about 1749 in an edition of approximately 500. Subscribers included the Earl and Countess of Burlington as well as other aristocracy; a number of academics and organists; taverns such as The Devil and The Globe in Fleet Street where concerts were held; the actor David Garrick (who produced many of Shakespeare's plays at Drury Lane) and some of the other Vauxhall musicians, including Valentine Snow for whom Handel wrote his famous trumpet solos; several composers including Arne and William Boyce (who both worked for Garrick at Drury Lane, composing music for many of his productions), Giovanni Battista Sammartini and Geminiani. Of this edition, only six copies have survived: two in London, one in Brussels and three in the United States. An incomplete set also survives in a private collection at Durham.

These six concertos were discovered only fairly recently. In 1980, Ruzena Wood, then repertoire consultant for the group Cantilena, had become interested in Hebden after studying his First Sonata for Flute and Keyboard. She began searching to find if he had written any music for strings. Finally, she discovered in the library of the British Museum, the six forgotten concertos which had lain unplayed for 200 years.

Hebden's concertos are in the baroque style. They are most influenced by the Italian composer and violinist, Geminiani, a follower of Arcangelo Corelli, who came to England in 1714 and from whom Thomas Arne may have had violin lessons. The concertos are in seven parts, written for four violins, viola, 'cello and harpsichord. Two (No. 2 in C major and No. 3 in C minor) have three movements (allegro-largo-allegro) and the others are in four movements (an opening adagio followed by alternating fast and slow movements). The fast movements are characterized by lively dance rhythms: while these are Italian in texture, they distinctly echo the English country dances with which Hebden would have been familiar with from his days in Yorkshire.

His only surviving works are the 6 concertos for strings (Op. 2):

- No. 1 in A Major
- No. 2 in C Major
- No. 3 in E minor
- No. 4 in E Flat
- No. 5 in C minor
- No. 6 in D minor

and his 6 solos for flute and harpsichord.
