= Oakes Park, Sheffield =

Privately owned park in Sheffield, South Yorkshire, England

Coordinates: 53.33428°N 1.451587°W

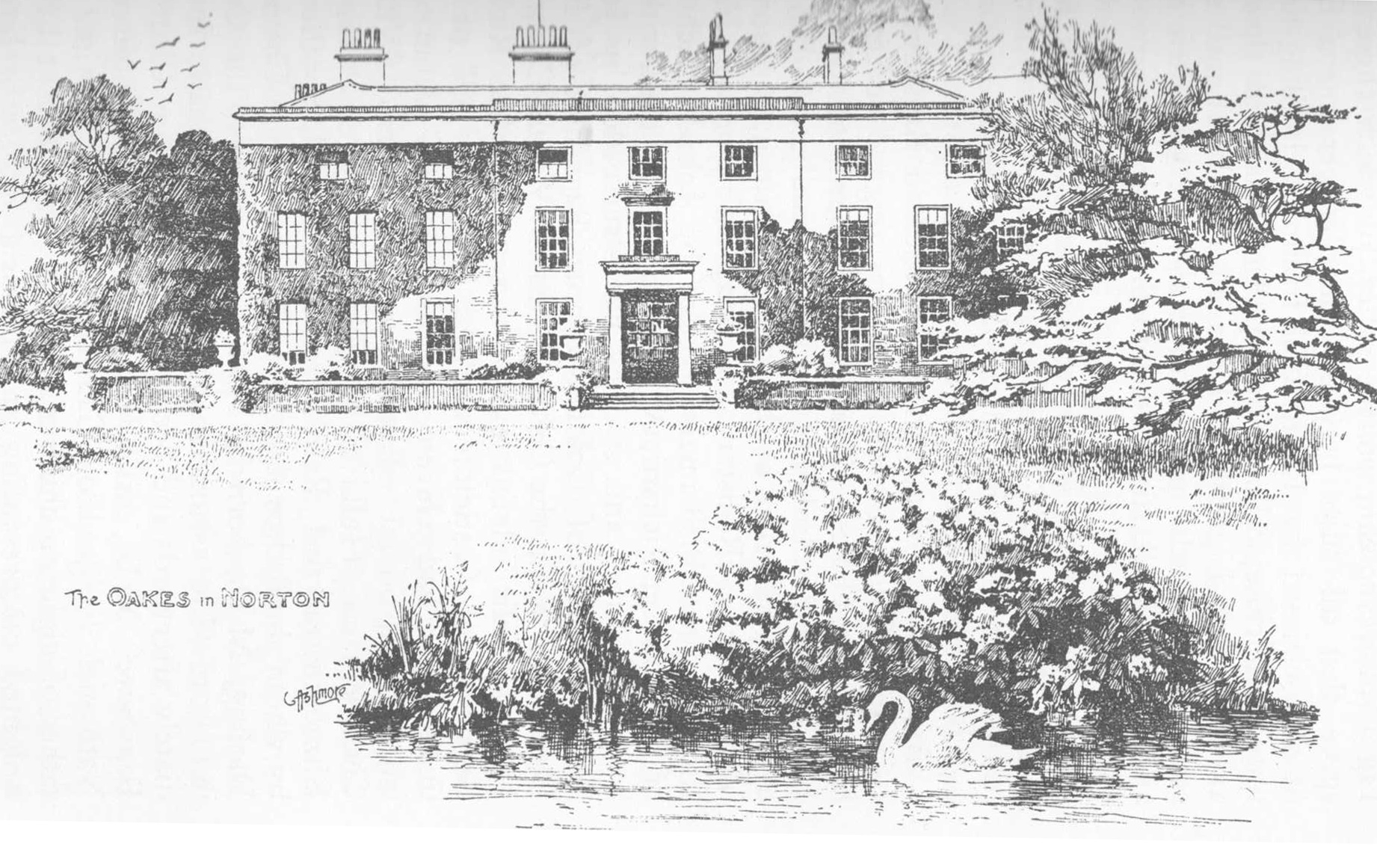
A line drawing from the 19th century

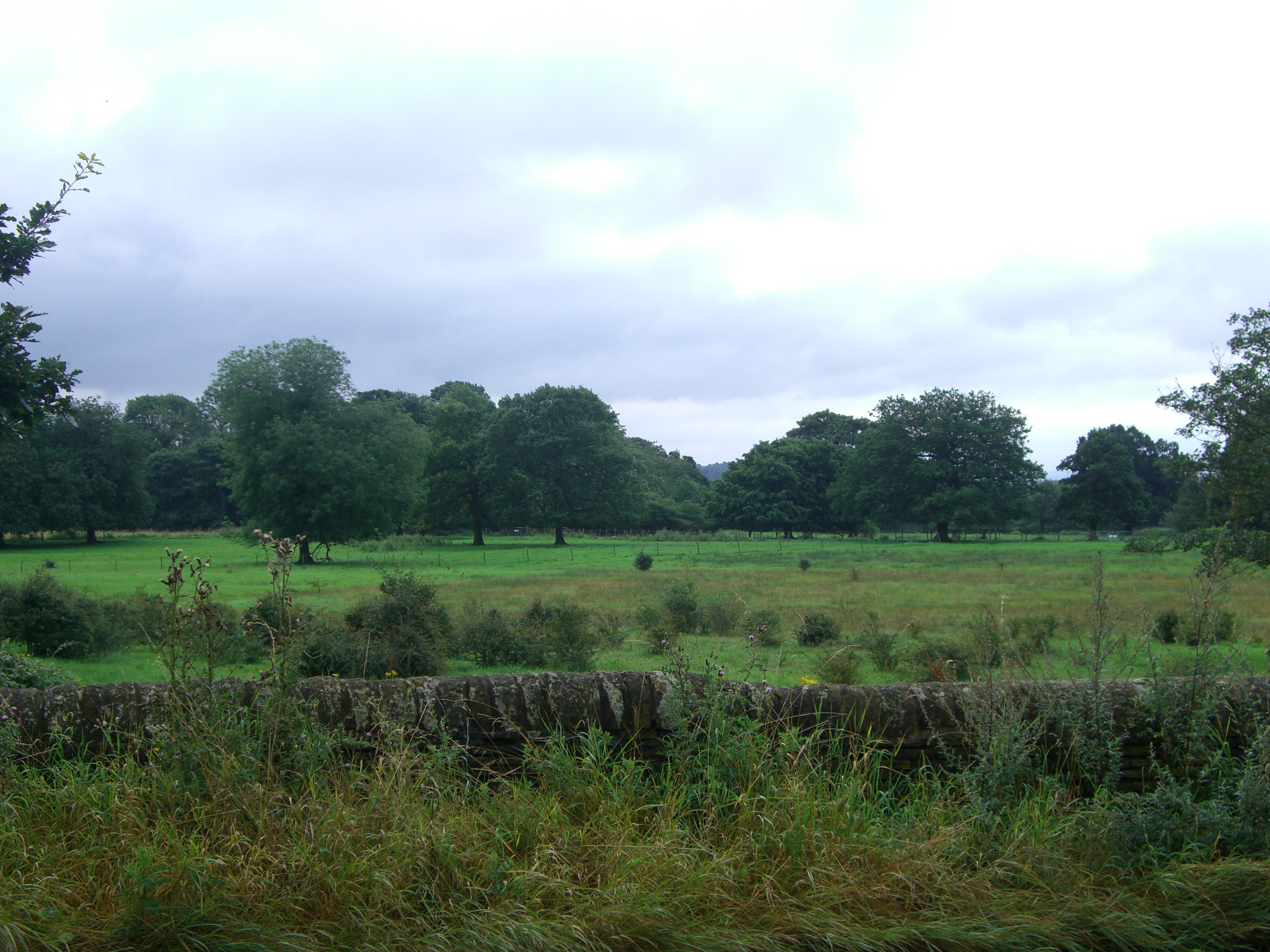
The grounds from Norton Lane, they have well established oak trees

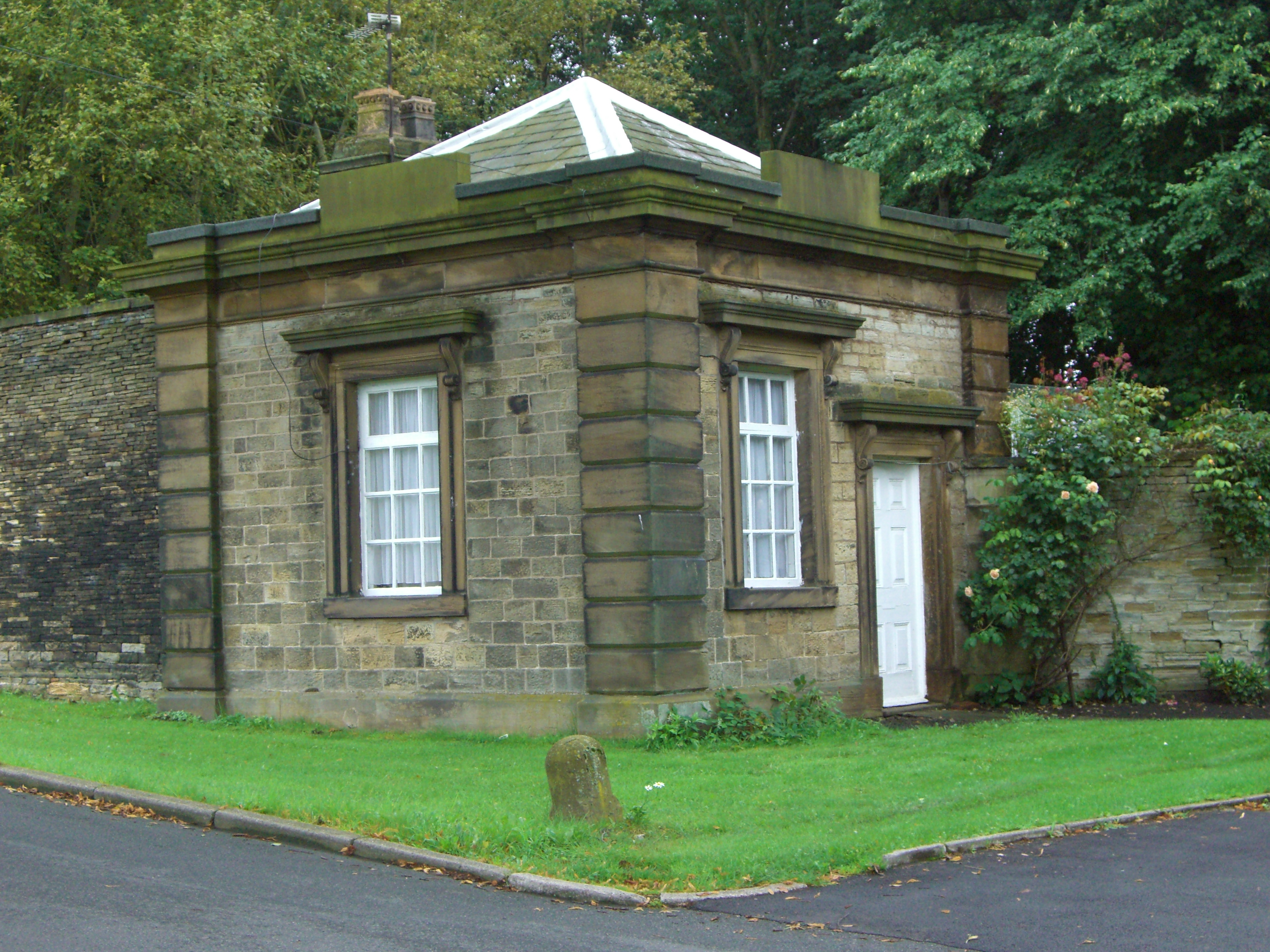
The gatehouse on School Lane

Oakes Park is a privately owned, historic park land in the green-belt area of south Sheffield. It contains 15 private homes as well as a 17th-century English country house which now operates as The Oakes Holiday Centre, a Christian, residential activity centre for young people between the ages of 8 and 18. It is set in extensive grounds which make it very difficult to be seen by the general public. It is situated on Norton Lane in the suburb of Norton within the City of Sheffield in England. The house is a Grade II* listed building, as are several other buildings and features.

The park also contains Norton Oakes Cricket Club at the Corner of Norton Lane and Norton Avenue.

== History ==
The first building on the site was mentioned in deeds of 1590 when John Parker was the owner. The Parkers were followed by Robert Boulton who purchased the houses for £355 and then Henry Wigfall of Eckington who paid £450 in 1624. The present house was built around the year 1668 by John Lee of nearby Hazelbarrow Hall for his bride Barbara, he purchased the "newly built messuage" for £1,600. Unfortunately Barbara died the same year and the house was sold to Francis Barker of Lees Hall at Norton Lees in 1672. Barker lived at the house with his wife Ann for only a short time and the house changed owners several times in a short period. In 1681 John Morewood sold the house to his wife’s brother Henry Gill for £1,240, whose eldest daughter Elizabeth married Richard Bagshawe in 1699.

=== The Bagshawe family ===
The Bagshawe family would remain as owners of Oakes Park for the next 288 years (until 1987). Three sons of Richard Bagshawe and Elizabeth Gill (Richard, William and John) held the Oakes estates in succession until the failure to produce an heir meant it was inherited in 1801 by a distant cousin of the family William Chambers Darling, a Hull doctor. Darling changed his name to Bagshawe, was knighted in 1806 and undertook a substantial redesign of the house using the Lancaster architect Joseph Badger, whose changes included a complete re-fronting of the house. He also embarked on large-scale modifications to the parkland around the house using Napoleonic War prisoners to dig out a lake, construct a walled garden and enclose over 100 acres. The terrace in front of the house was designed by Francis Chantrey while the garden is thought to have been planned by John Nash. William Chambers Bagshawe also stocked the house with much fine furniture and antiques. These included paintings by George Frederic Watts, George Stubbs and Michael Dahl, furniture by Thomas Sheraton, George Hepplewhite and Thomas Chippendale plus beautiful glass and silverware.

The tenth owner of The Oakes was the rather eccentric Mrs. Isherwood Bagshawe who did not believe in progressive development and had no modern amenities in the house, she closed all the rooms and covered the art treasures with sacking and old newspaper. In 1963 Major Thornber Bagshawe inherited the house and found that it had no telephone or electric lighting installed, he and his wife Hilary spent a substantial sum of money renovating the house and then opening it up to the general public for viewing. The downfall of Oakes Park as a stately home began in the early 1980s with the construction of the A6102 (Bochum Parkway) as part of the Sheffield Outer Ring Road which cut the estate into two, demolishing many old buildings and two cruck barns.

=== Modern developments ===
The Bagshawes left Oakes Park in 1987 and it was purchased by Henry Boot PLC, the property developers. In October 1997 Sheffield City Council granted planning permission for the house to be used as a holiday activity centre. In May 1998 the property was purchased by The Oakes Trust (Sheffield), an interdenominational Christian charity who undertook extensive renovation and converted it into The Oakes Holiday Centre running residential holidays for young people to hear the Christian message. The centre opened on 1 July 2000.

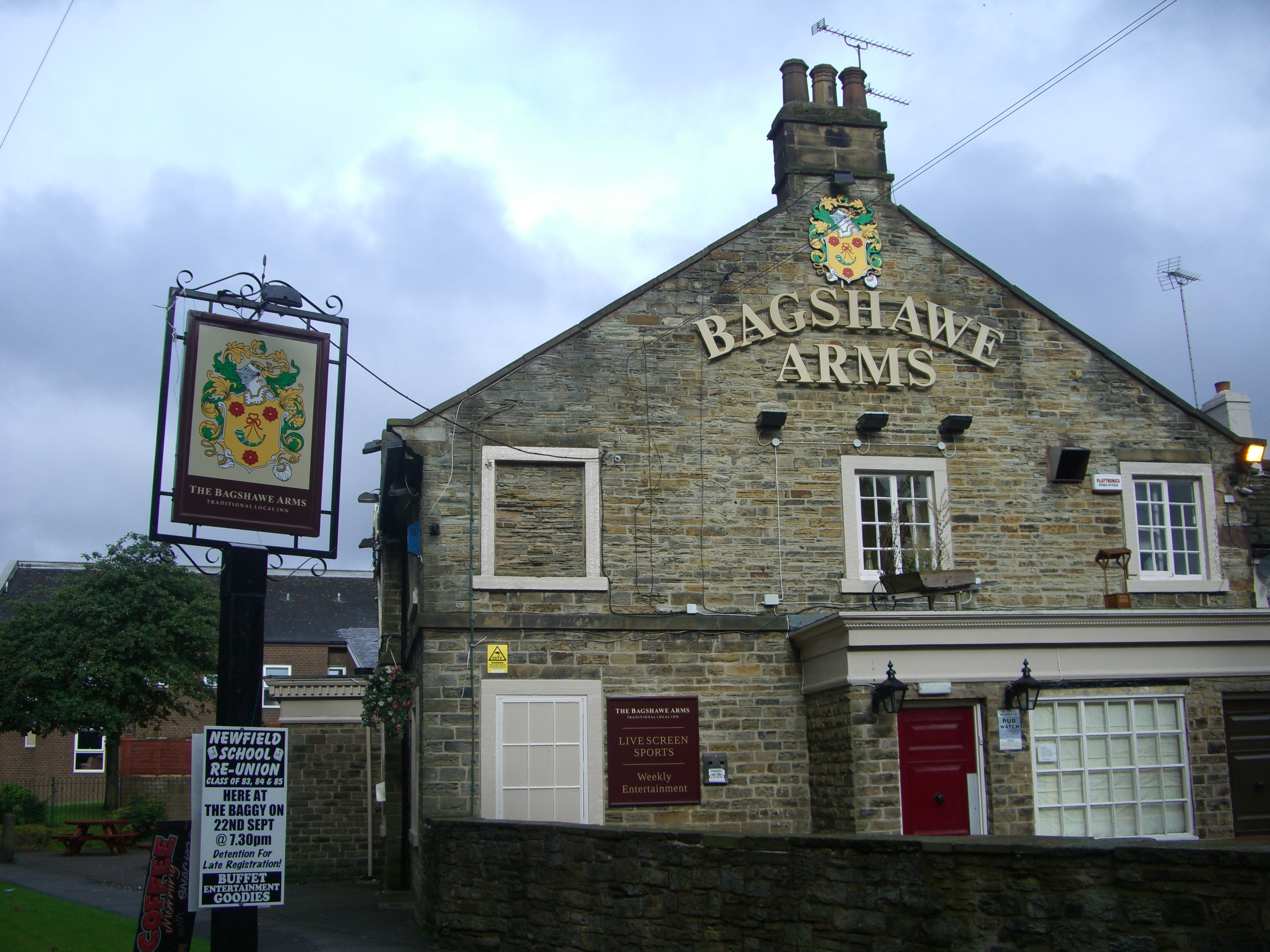
The Bagshawe Arms

=== Bagshawe Arms ===
Although not on the original Oakes Park estate, the Bagshawe Arms stands adjacent to it on the north side of Norton Avenue. It was originally a farmhouse belonging to the Bagshawes built with stone from the local Mawfa Lane quarries, it was enlarged and renovated in 1829 and has served as an inn since at least 1844. There is a stone embedded in the south end of the gable with the initials "F.W.B." (Francis Westby Bagshawe) along with a date of 1859.

== Architecture ==
The main house in the park is Grade II listed, as are the adjoining terrace walls, steps and gateway. The gateway and adjoining walls at garden entrance to Oakes Park and the gardens are on the register of buildings at risk. The gateway was recently restored with the help of English Heritage.

The Oakes is constructed from coursed rubble with ashlars dressings with a hipped slate roof. The south facing front of the three storey house has a range of nine windows on the first two floors consisting of 12 paned sashes, the third storey is made up of seven six paned sashes. The main entrance has a Doric portico.
