= Plumpton Rocks =

Pleasure gardens in Plompton, England

- Plompton Rocks, circa 1798 – J. M. W. Turner
- Interactive map of Plumpton Rocks
- Location: Plompton, North Yorkshire, England
- Coordinates: 53.977°N 1.458°W
- Area: 26 hectares (64 acres)
- Created: 1750s
- Status: Open weekends in summer.
- Website: http://www.plumptonrocks.com/index.html

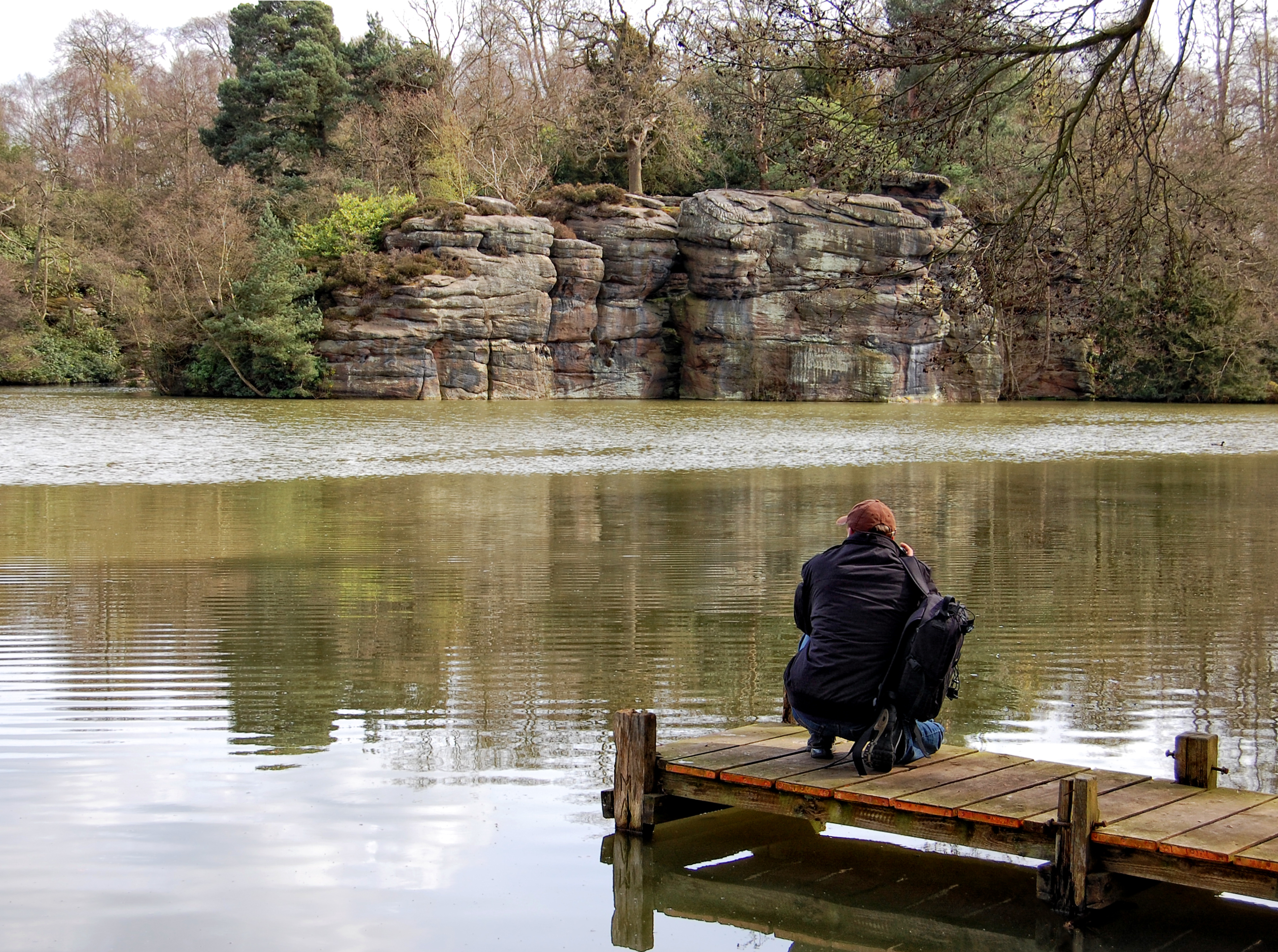
A photographer capturing an image of the rocks in 2009

Plumpton Rocks is a man-made lake and surrounding pleasure gardens 3.5 miles (5.6 km) south-east of Harrogate in North Yorkshire, England, near the village of Plompton. The site is now operated as a tourist attraction by the owner, Robert de Plumpton Hunter. It is a Grade II* listed park and garden. The site is now generally spelt with a 'u' (the older name of the parish), although artist J. M. W. Turner referred to it as Plompton Rocks, in keeping with the modern spelling of the parish itself. The gardens reopened in July 2016 following a major restoration of the lake, dam and woods. It closed again in October 2019 to bring the lake dam up to standard for the Reservoirs Act 1975, and reopened in September 2022.

== History ==
The gardens were designed by Daniel Lascelles in the 1750s against a backdrop of towering millstone grit rocks that have been eroded by the wind. The lake was extended by a dam built by John Carr, architect of Plompton Hall and Harewood House. After 1784 the gardens became part of the extensive Harewood estate. J. M. W. Turner was commissioned by Edward Lascelles, 1st Earl of Harewood, to produce two paintings of the lake and rocks. These now hang at Harewood House. The rocks were also painted by Thomas Girtin. A chasm between two rocks is known as Lovers' Leap.

The site was sold by the 6th Earl of Harewood in the 1950s. It was a location for the 2016 film Swallows and Amazons.

== See also ==
- Listed buildings in Plompton
