= Shroggs Park =

Park in Halifax, West Yorkshire, England

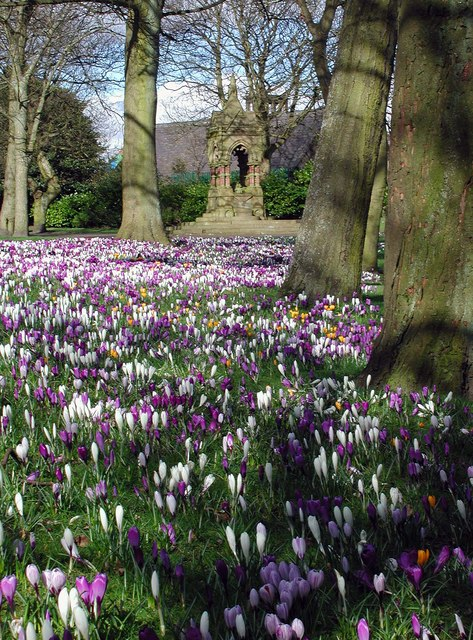
- Interactive map of Shroggs Park
- Type: public
- Location: Halifax, West Yorkshire, England
- Coordinates: 53°43′53″N 1°52′36″W
- Area: 9.7 hectares (24 acres)
- Operator: Calderdale Metropolitan Borough Council
- Open: All year

Shroggs Park is a park in Halifax, West Yorkshire, England. It covers 9.7 hectares and is Grade II listed with Historic England.

== History ==
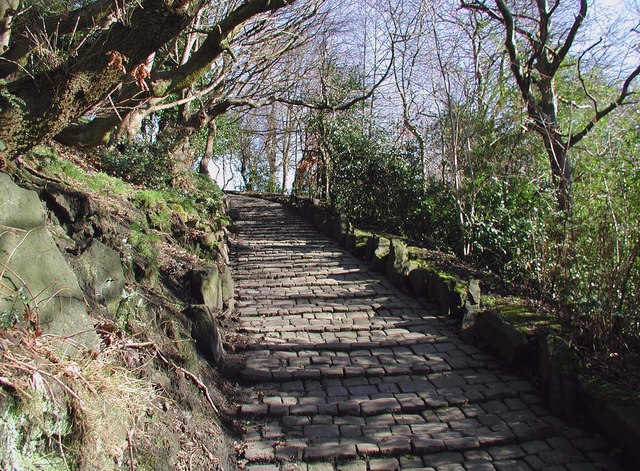
Footpath entrance to Shroggs Park

On 22 November 1872, Colonel Edward Akroyd, a businessman, promised to construct a park in Halifax. During a committee meeting at the House of Commonsto he explained the work he had undertaken to prevent the land from being used for the planned Midland Railway. On 25 June 1879, he gave the partly finished park to the public on the condition that the municipal corporation completed it and used it solely as a park. It was finished and opened to the public in 1881.

=== Naming ===
The name derives from the term "bushy scrub", as the park was originally scrap land covered in dwarf oak scrub.

== Features ==
The park has a pond, mature evergreen trees and bushes, informal footpaths, a gothic drinking fountain, and woodland paths. The Halifax parkrun takes place each Saturday.
