= Stoney Royd Cemetery =

Cemetery in West Yorkshire, England

Coordinates: 53°42′50″N 1°51′2″W

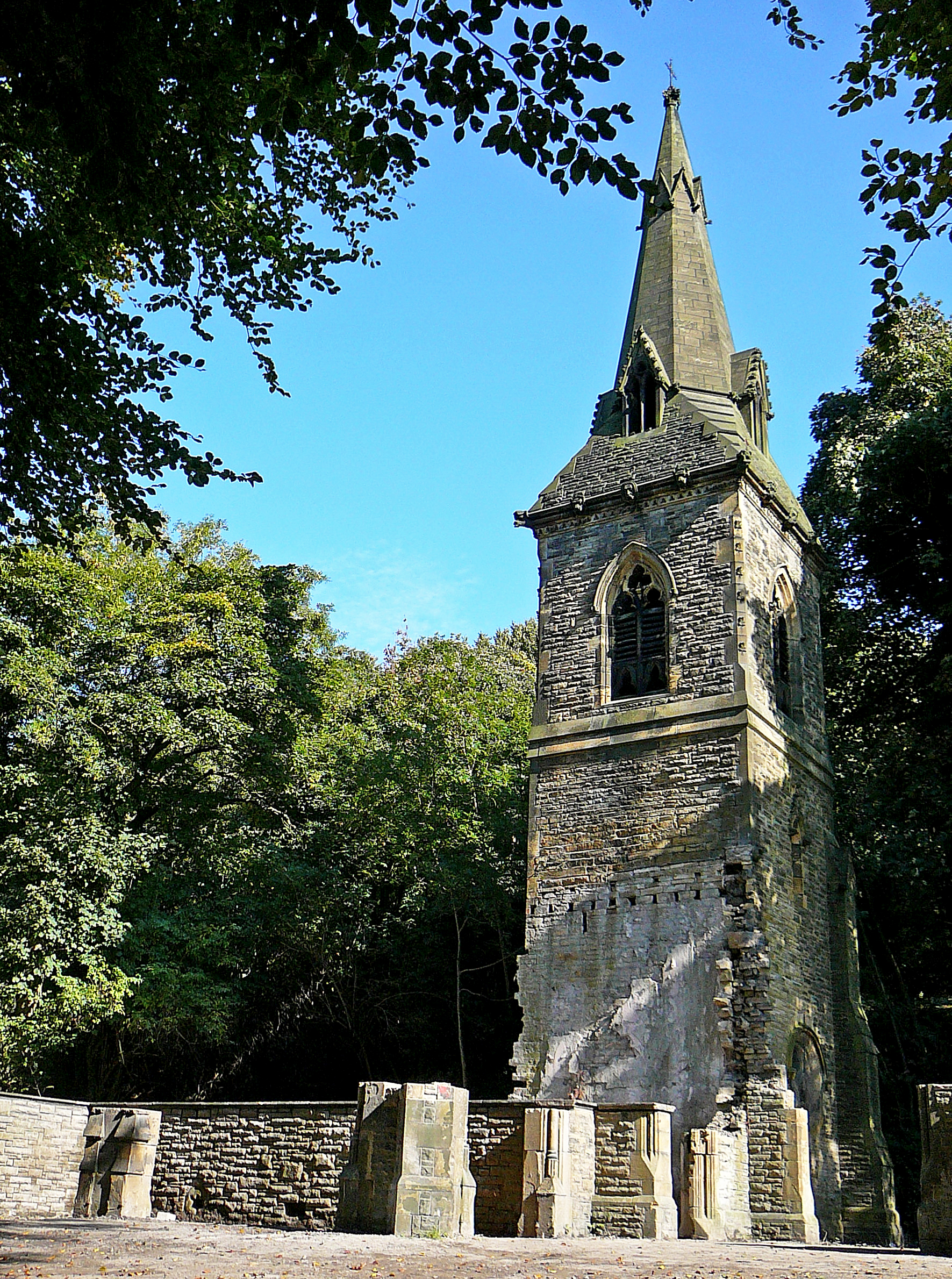
Tower and spire of the demolished Church of England (southern) chapel

Stoney (or Stony) Royd Cemetery is a cemetery in Halifax, West Yorkshire, England.

Stoney Royd House was a brick house built for Christopher Rawson (1777-1849), the third son of John Rawson of Bolton "a little before 1764". It was demolished in the second half of the 20th century. One of its original gate lodges remains as part of the cemetery.

In 1860 Halifax Corporation bought the site to turn it into a cemetery. Edward Milner won a competition for its design. It opened in 1861, and the northern section was consecrated on 11 September 1862. The southern section was for Nonconformist burials.

Two chapels were built: one each for Church of England and Nonconformist funerals. The Church of England one was a cruciform Gothic Revival building with a tower, broach spire and polygonal apse. In 1973 the Department of the Environment made it a Grade II listed building. In 2007 its roof collapsed in a storm, and Calderdale Metropolitan Borough Council obtained listed building consent to demolish it. The tower and spire survive.

The cemetery contains monuments for 76 war dead, under the care of the Commonwealth War Graves Commission.
