= Oulton Hall =

Grade II listed building in West Yorkshire, England

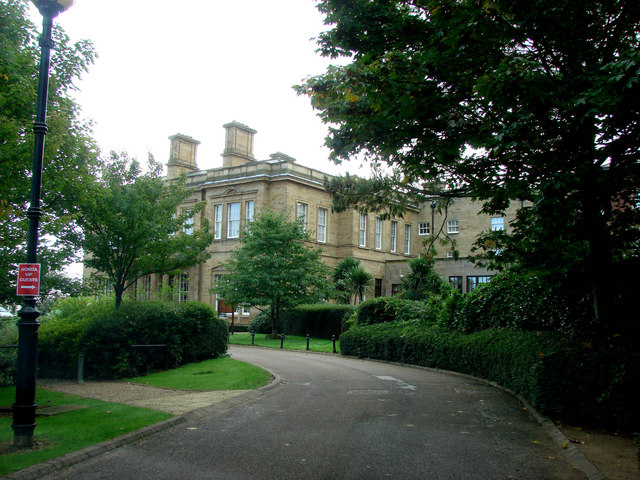
- Interactive map of the Oulton Hall area

General information
- Location: Rothwell Lane, Oulton, Leeds, England
- Coordinates: 53.745°N 1.459°W (grid reference SE3527)
- Owner: QHotels

Design and construction
- Designations: Grade II listed

Website
- Oulton Hall

Oulton Hall in Oulton, West Yorkshire, is a Grade II listed building in England. It was once the home of the Blayds/Calverley family. After a major fire in 1850 the hall was remodelled, but its fortunes declined until it was revived for use as a hotel. As of 2022, it is a 4 star hotel, part of the QHotels group as Oulton Hall Hotel, Spa & Golf Resort.

== History ==
Oulton Hall was originally a "modest eighteenth-century house" owned by the Blayds family. In 1807 the house was left to John Calverley, who was a partner in Beckett's Bank and Mayor of Leeds in 1798. He changed his name to Blayds in order to inherit the property, but his descendants reverted to Calverley. He enclosed the surrounding common in 1809, and it was landscaped to designs by Humphrey Repton soon afterwards. In around 1822, he commissioned Sir Robert Smirke to remodel the house, and it was enlarged by Smirke's brother, Sydney, in 1839. In 1850 a fire destroyed much of the property, including most of the Smirkes' work. The Leeds firm of Perkin and Backhouse rebuilt the hall, and further work was done in 1875 by Perkin and Sons and in 1885 by Chorley and Cannon of Leeds.

The hall had various uses during the 20th century. In the First World War it was used as a hospital and convalescent home for soldiers diagnosed with neurasthenia. The hall opened as a hospital in July 1918 under the command of Colonel C. W. E. Duncombe to provide care for officers with shell shock. Fifty officers were admitted in 1918, with seventy-one beds available in total. Treatment was focused on confidential talks with the doctor, occupational therapy and a focus on learning, poetry and gardening. The Leeds Education Committee allowed patients to attend classes in the city free of charge. Trips out were organised, with patients travelling to Ilkley, in 1923. The hospital closed in July 1925 and the patients were transferred to Grantham. This decision was unpopular in the press, as it took soldiers much further away from their families and left the North of England without a specialist treatment centre for psychological wounds inflicted by experiences in the First World War.

In 1925 the owners sold the hall and grounds to the county council. It was used as a hospital for psychiatric patients until 1971. Oulton Hall then changed hands, but due to the new owner's lack of resources it fell into disrepair, and in 1974 it was derelict. In 1991 De Vere Hotels acquired the lease and rescued it. Restoration and expansion cost £20 million to turn the hall into a hotel set in an estate of 300 acres (1.2 km^{2}), with gardens, a 27-hole golf course and a spa.

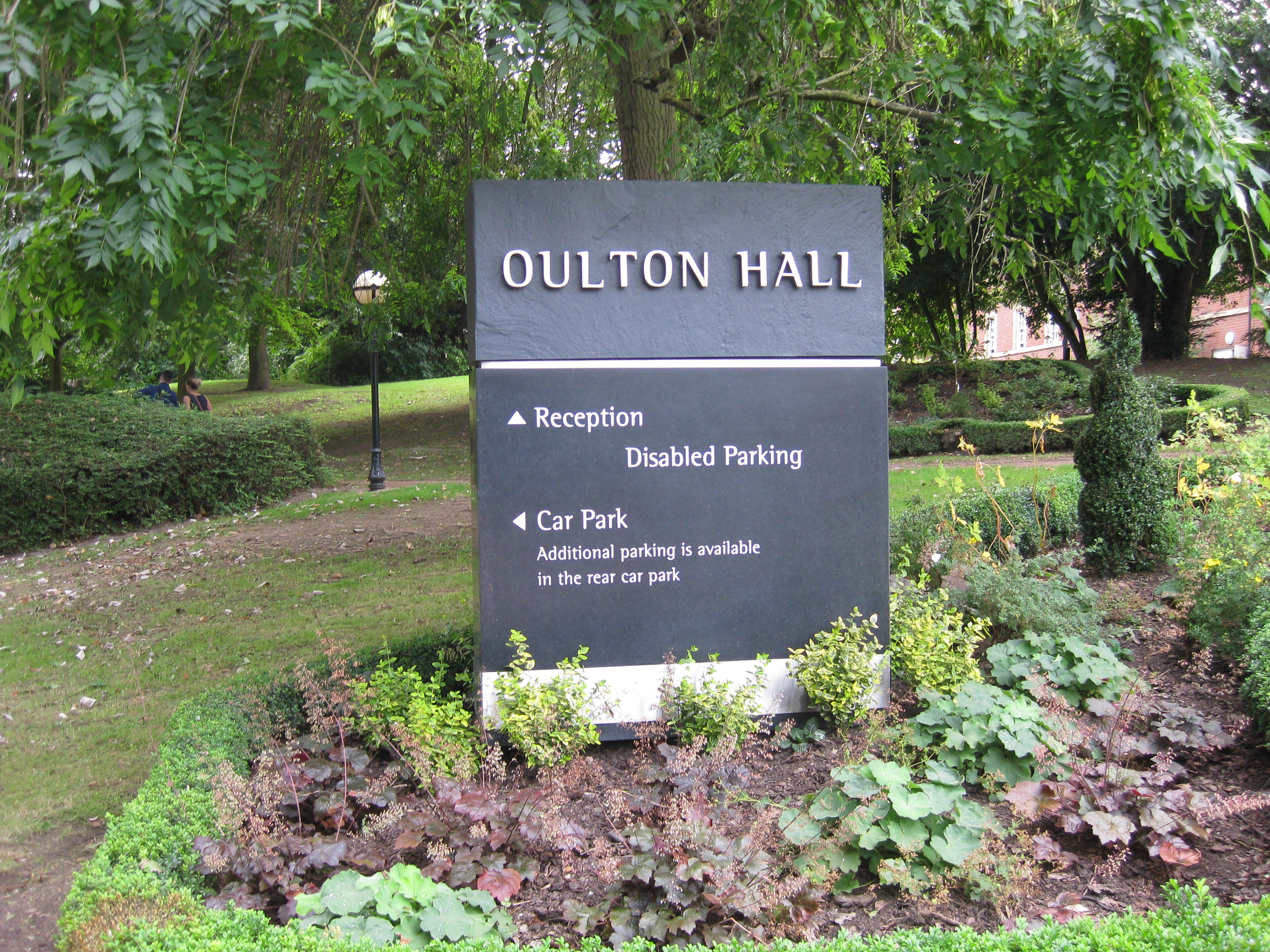
Sign

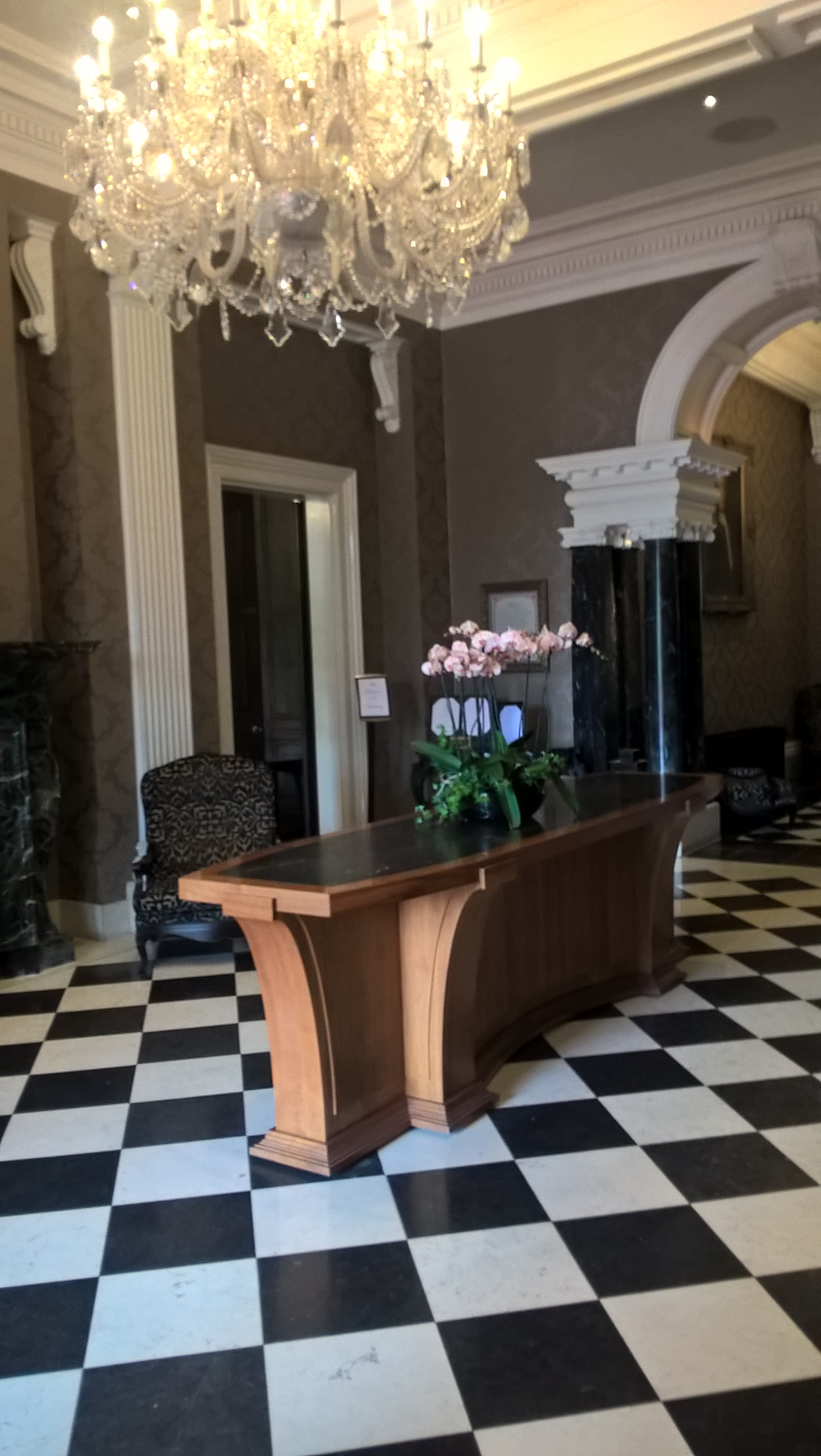
Lobby

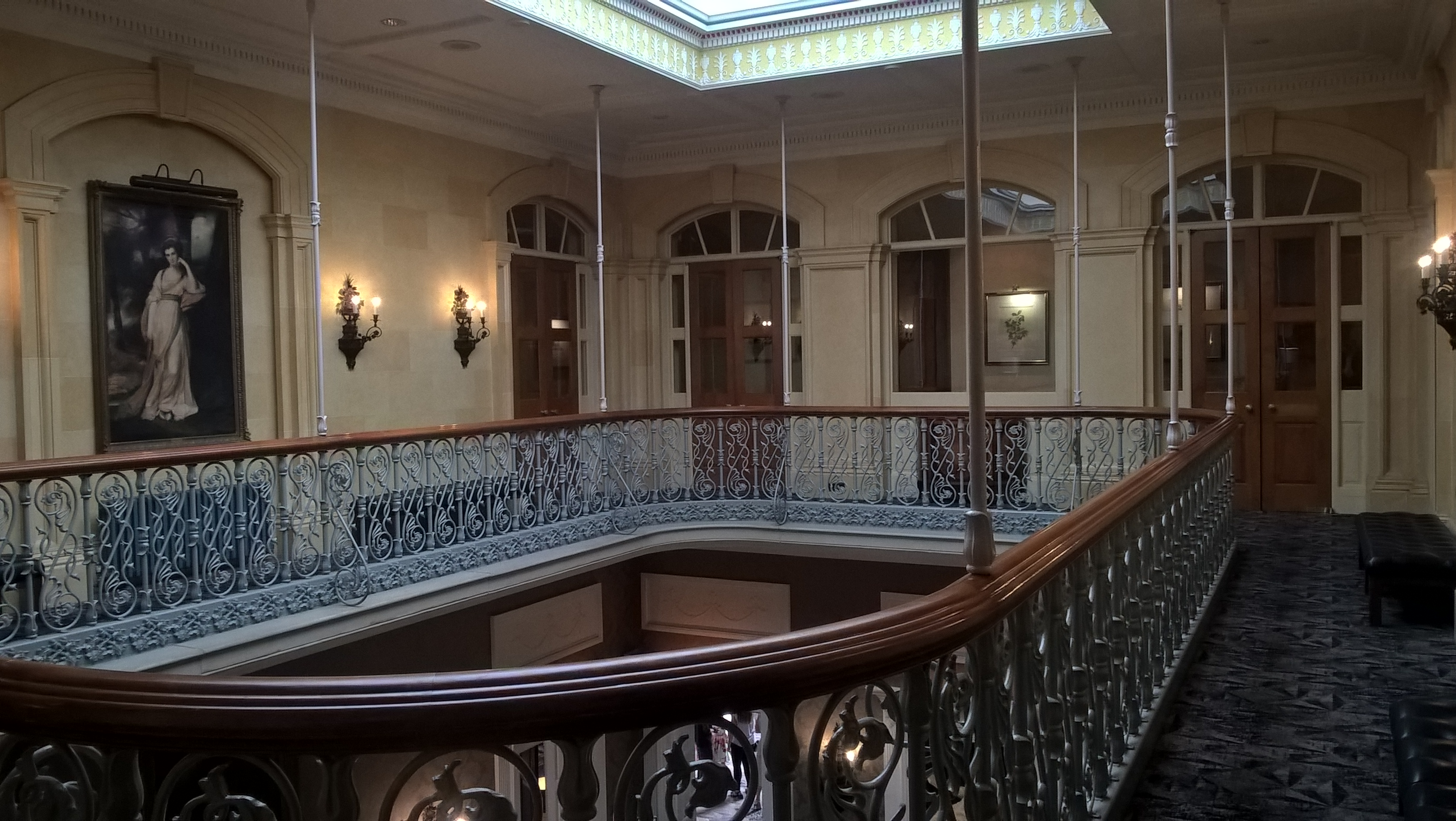
Upstairs
