= Plompton =

Hamlet and civil parish in North Yorkshire, England

Coordinates: 53.984°N 1.457°W

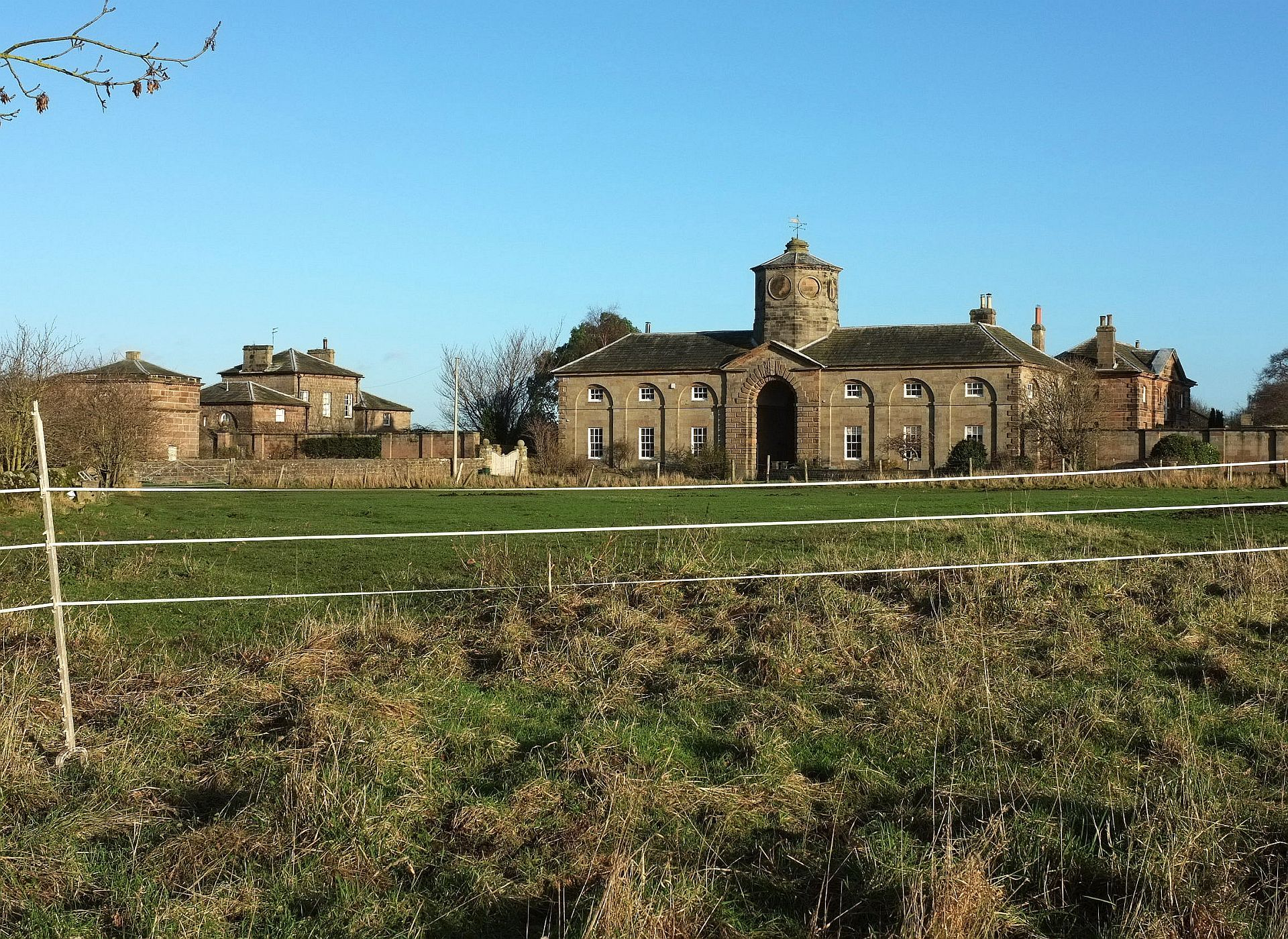
- Plompton Hall

- Location within North Yorkshire
- Population: 124 (2011 census)
- OS grid reference: SE355535
- Unitary authority: North Yorkshire
- Ceremonial county: North Yorkshire
- Region: Yorkshire and the Humber
- Country: England
- Sovereign state: United Kingdom
- Post town: KNARESBOROUGH
- Postcode district: HG5
- Dialling code: 01423
- Police: North Yorkshire
- Fire: North Yorkshire
- Ambulance: Yorkshire
- UK Parliament: Harrogate and Knaresborough

Plompton (formerly also spelt Plumpton) is a hamlet and civil parish south of Harrogate in North Yorkshire, England. It is close to the A661.

Plompton Hall is a Grade II* listed building designed by the architect John Carr and built about 1760. The composer John Hebden originates from the parish.

== History ==
Plompton was mentioned in Domesday Book (as Plontone) and in the Middle Ages was variously spelt Plumton, Plumpton or Plompton. The name is from the Old English plūme and tūn, and means ‘plum-tree farmstead’. Plompton or Plumpton was historically a township in the parish of Spofforth in the West Riding of Yorkshire and became a separate civil parish in 1866. In 1974 the parish was transferred to the new county of North Yorkshire, and from 1974 to 2023 it was part of the Borough of Harrogate. It is now administered by the unitary North Yorkshire Council.

It was the seat of the Plumpton family from the reign of William the Conqueror until 1749, when it was sold to Daniel Lascelles. The estate was then part of the Harewood estate until the 1950s. It was reacquired by the Plumpton family in the 20th century.

== Plumpton Rocks ==
Plumpton Rocks is a man-made lake and surrounding pleasure gardens in the grounds of Plompton Hall. The gardens were designed by Daniel Lascelles

== See also ==
- Listed buildings in Plompton
