= Golden Lion (disambiguation) =

The Golden Lion is the highest prize given to a film at the Venice Film Festival.

Golden Lion may also refer to:

== Awards ==
- Cannes Lion, sometimes erroneously called Golden Lion, advertising award
- Golden Lion (Venice Biennale), awards given at the Venice Biennale exhibition

== Buildings ==
- Golden Lion (St. Paul's Churchyard) (aka Golden Lyon), a historical bookseller in London
- Golden Lion, Fulham, a pub and former music venue in London
- Golden Lion, Port Isaac, a pub in Cornwall, England
- Golden Lion, St Ives, a pub in Cambridgeshire, England
- Golden Lion, Whitby, a pub in North Yorkshire, England
- Golden Lion Hotel, Hunstanton, a hotel in Norfolk, England
- The Golden Lion Hotel, Northallerton, a hotel in North Yorkshire

== Works ==
- Golden Lion (novel), a 2015 book by Wilbur Smith in The Courtney Novels series
- "The Golden Lion" (fairy tale), an Italian fairy tale

== Other uses ==
- Dutch ship Gouden Leeuw (Golden Lion), Dutch flagship at the Battle of Texel (1673)
- A gold coin issued by the United States of Belgium (1790)
- Golden Lion FC, a Martinican football team

== See also ==
- Golden Lions (disambiguation)
- Golden Lion Stadium, a multi-purpose stadium in Pine Bluff, Arkansas, United States
- Golden lion tamarin, a small New World monkey of the family Callitrichidae
- "Gold Lion", 2006 single by indie rock band the Yeah Yeah Yeahs
- Order of the Gold Lion of the House of Nassau, a chivalric order
