= Listed buildings in Whitby =

The listed buildings in Whitby can be found in:

- Listed buildings in Whitby (central area - east)
- Listed buildings in Whitby (central area - west)
- Listed buildings in Whitby (outer areas)
