= St Hilda's Terrace =

Historic street in Whitby, North Yorkshire, England

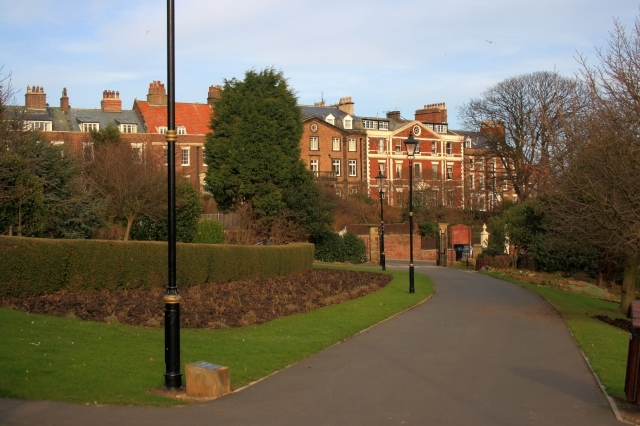
- The street, seen from Pannett Park
- Former names: New Buildings, King Street
- Location: Whitby, North Yorkshire, England
- Postal code: YO21
- North: Back St Hilda's Terrace
- East: Flowergate
- South: Pannett Park
- West: Roundabout to Chub Hill Road, Spring Vale and Upgang Lane

Construction
- Completion: Late 18th century

Other
- Known for: Grade II* listed buildings

St Hilda's Terrace is a historic street in Whitby, a town in North Yorkshire, England.

== History ==
The street was laid out over fields in the late 18th century, and was built up with large houses, mostly occupied by ship owners. It was originally named "New Buildings" and "King Street", with a small lane behind the buildings acquiring the name "St Hilda's Terrace". When the current name was transferred to the street, the lane became "Back St Hilda's Terrace".

The houses form a long terrace on the north side of the street. In 1817, Dr Young described it as the town's finest street, noting that "it forms but one row of houses; but all of them are beautiful and some magnificent". Numbers 1 to 10 had broadly similar plans, but were altered to meet the requirements of their first owners. During the Georgian era, most were leased out, but by the 19th century many were occupied by their owners, and later several served as doctors' surgeries. Several houses were requisitions as billets or training venues during the First and Second World Wars. By 1954, all the buildings on the street had been listed, and all are now listed at Grade II*. By this time, several had been divided into apartments, with some later becoming holiday lets. In the 2010s, Janet Kukk of the Whitby Civic Society drew up a complete history of ownership of the buildings.

== Architecture ==
=== 1–6 St Hilda's Terrace ===
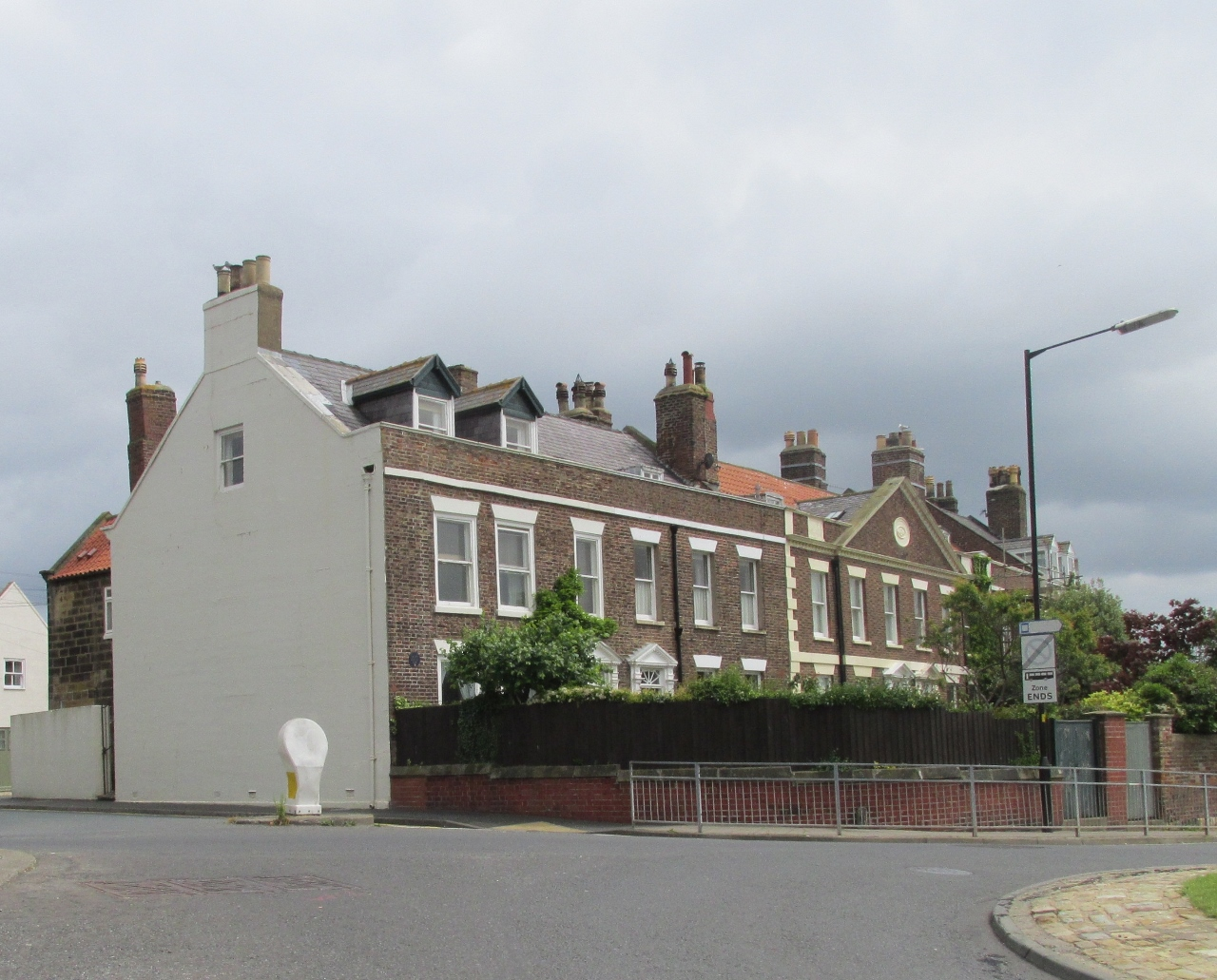
1 to 6 St Hilda's Terrace

The terrace of six houses is built of brick with stone dressings, parapets, and slate or pantile roofs. It has two storeys and attics, and each house has three bays. Over the middle four bays of the central two houses is a dentilled cornice and pediment containing an oval plaque, and this pair of houses is flanked by quoins. Some houses have doorways with fluted pilasters and pediments, and others have plain surrounds. The windows are double-hung sashes, and some houses have dormers.

=== 7–10 St Hilda's Terrace ===
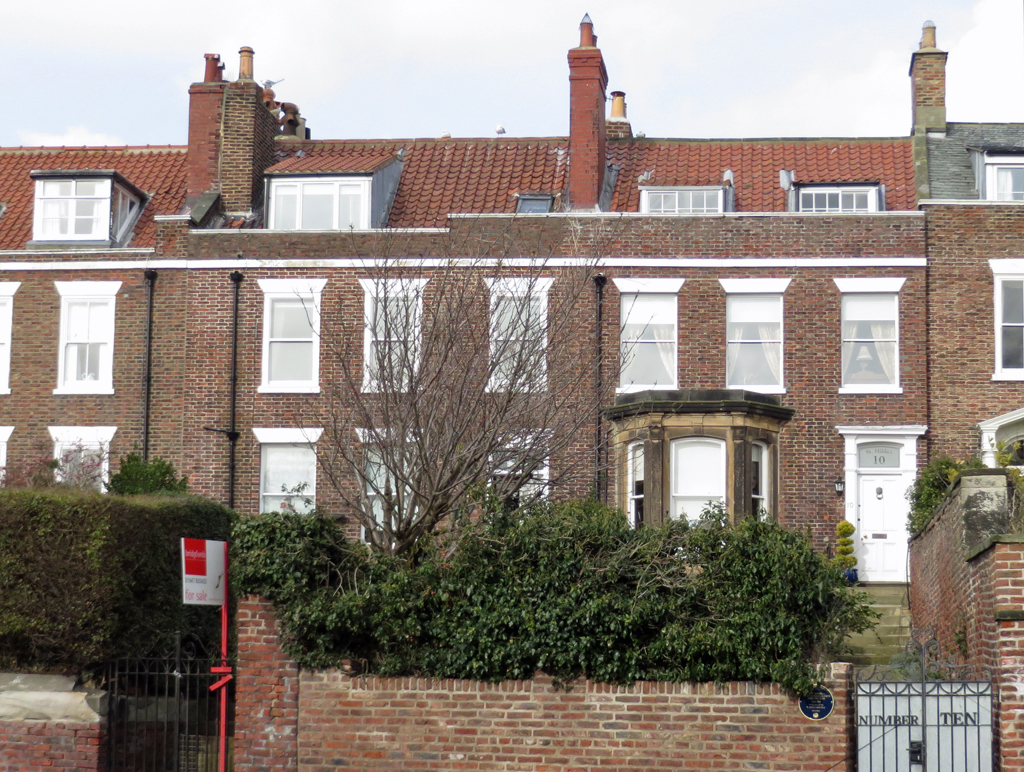
7 to 10 St Hilda's Terrace

The terrace of three houses is built of brick with stone dressings, parapets, and slate or pantile roofs. It has two storeys and attics, and each house has three bays. The left house has a doorway with a glazed ornamental fanlight, the middle house has a modern door, and the right house has a doorway with pilasters and a plain rectangular fanlight. The right house has a canted bay window, the other windows are sashes, and above are dormers. In 1859, William Clarkson was born at number 10, now commemorated by a blue plaque.

=== 11 and 12 St Hilda's Terrace ===
The pair of houses are built of brown brick, with a parapet and a slate roof. They have two storeys and attics, and each house has three bays. The doorways have Doric columns, a semicircular fanlight, and an open pediment. The right house has a curved bay window, the other windows are sashes, and each house has dormers.

=== 13 and 14 St Hilda's Terrace ===
The pair of houses are built of brick with a moulded cornice, a parapet and a pantile roof. There are two storeys and attics, and five bays. In the centre is a doorway with columns, a round-arched fanlight and an open pediment, and the entrance to No. 13 is at the rear. The windows are double-hung sashes, and there are three dormers. Number 14 has a plaque on the rear, bearing the date 1779.

=== 15 and 16 St Hilda's Terrace ===
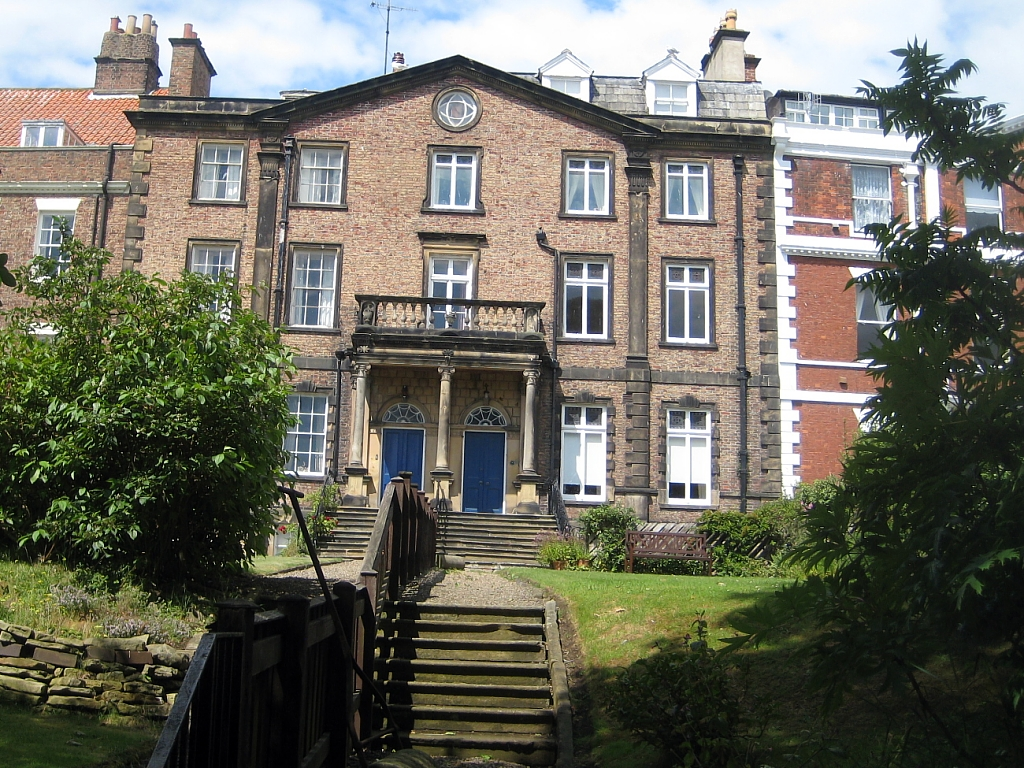
15 and 16 St Hilda's Terrace

The property was originally a single house, but was divided into two by 1797. It was added to the Heritage at Risk Register in 2021, as it was in poor repair. It is built of brick, with stone dressings, rusticated quoins, a floor band, and a dentilled cornice. It has three storeys and five bays. Over the middle three bays is a pediment containing a circular window, on full-height pilasters with fluted caps. The doorways, which are approached by steps, are paired in the centre in a porch with three columns and a balustrade, and they have round heads and radiating fanlights. The windows have architraves, those on the ground floor with square block rustications. The right house has a slate Mansard roof and three dormers.

=== St Hilda ===
The house, at 17 St Hilda's Terrace, is built of red brick, with stone dressings, rusticated quoins, and floor and sill bands. It has three storeys and five bays, the middle three bays projecting under a pediment with a round window in the tympanum, and flanked by pilasters. In the centre is a painted glazed porch, and the windows are sashes.

=== 18 and 19 St Hilda's Terrace ===
The paired houses are built of brown brick, with rusticated quoins, a floor band, a cornice and a parapet. It has three storeys and a basement, and five bays. Steps with railings lead up to paired central doorways with panelled pilasters, and semicircular fanlights under a common steep pediment. The left house has a canted bay window, and the other windows are double-hung sashes.

=== 20 St Hilda's Terrace ===
The house is built of brick, with rusticated quoins, sill bands, a cornice, a parapet and a pantile roof. It has two storeys and five bays. In the centre is a doorway with a pediment, it is flanked by bay windows, and the other windows are sashes with rendered arches.

=== 21 St Hilda's Terrace ===
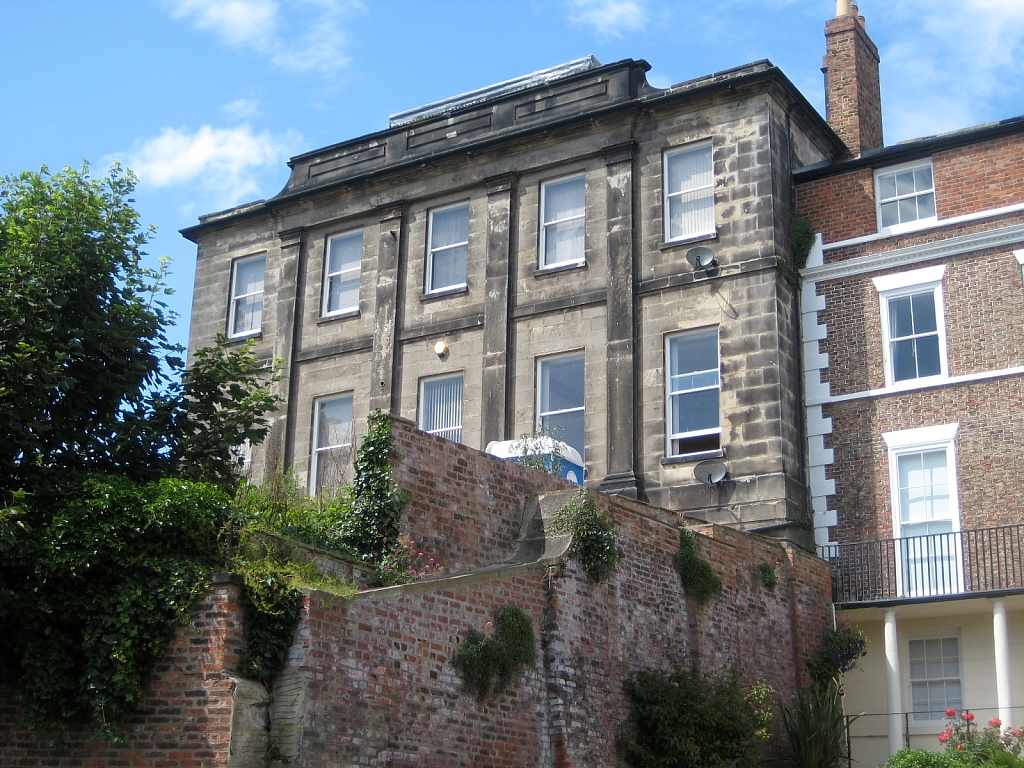
21 St Hilda's Terrace

The large stone house has a floor band, a central entablature with a cornice and a blocking course, and a central panelled parapet with sides ramped up to it. It has two storeys and a basement, and five bays divided by full-height Doric pilasters. The doorway has a segmental head, Doric columns in antis, and a radial fanlight. The windows are double-hung sashes. At the rear are two storeys, and a wide doorway with a Tuscan surround and a complex fanlight.

=== 22 St Hilda's Terrace ===
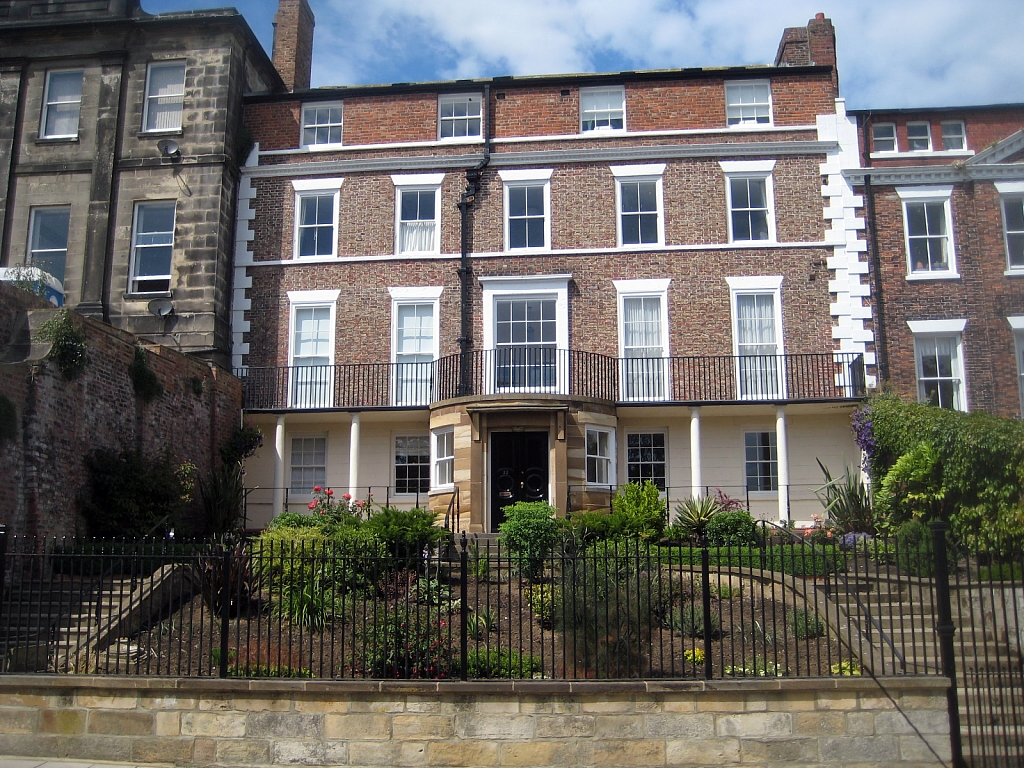
22 St Hilda's Terrace

The house, at one time an office for Whitby Council, is built of brick, with rusticated quoins, an iron balcony above the ground floor, sill bands, a cornice, and a parapet with stone capping. There are three storeys, an attic storey above the parapet, and five bays. In the centre is an early 19th-century semicircular porch, and a doorway with a hood on consoles. The windows are double-hung sashes.

=== 23 St Hilda's Terrace ===
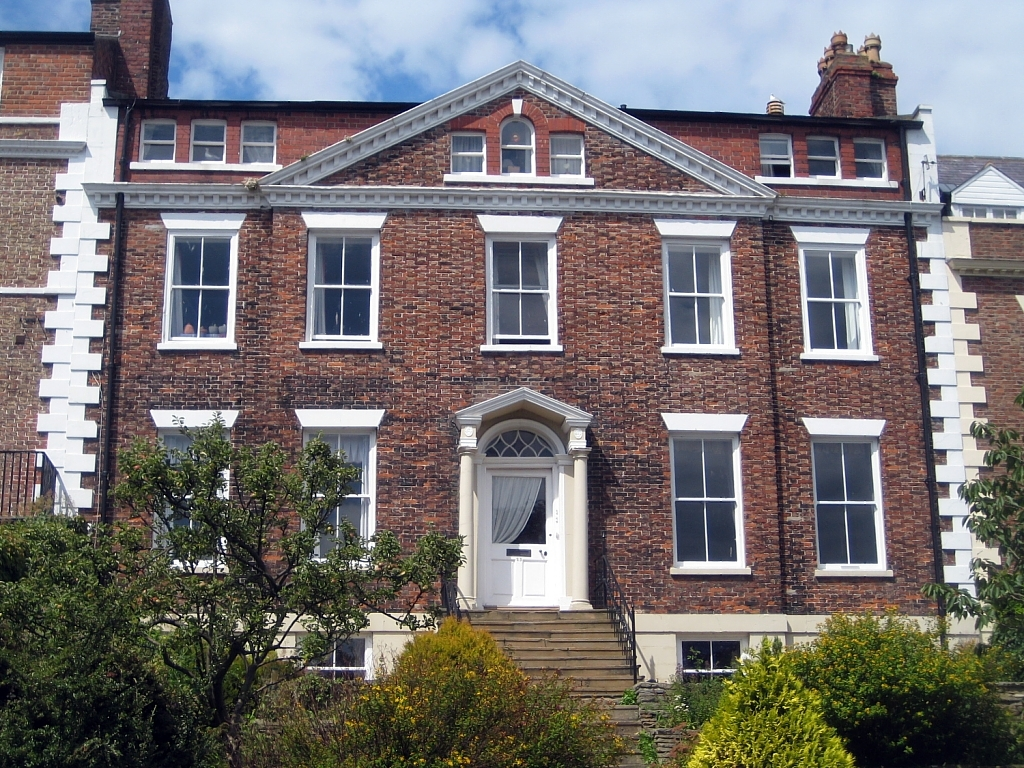
23 St Hilda's Terrace

The house, at one time an office, is in brick, the basement rendered, with quoins, and a dentilled cornice. There are two storeys, a basement and an attic, and five bays, the middle three bays projecting slightly under a dentilled pediment containing a Venetian window with a keystone. In the centre is a Doric doorway with a round-arched fanlight, and an open pediment. The windows are double-hung sashes.

=== 24 St Hilda's Terrace ===
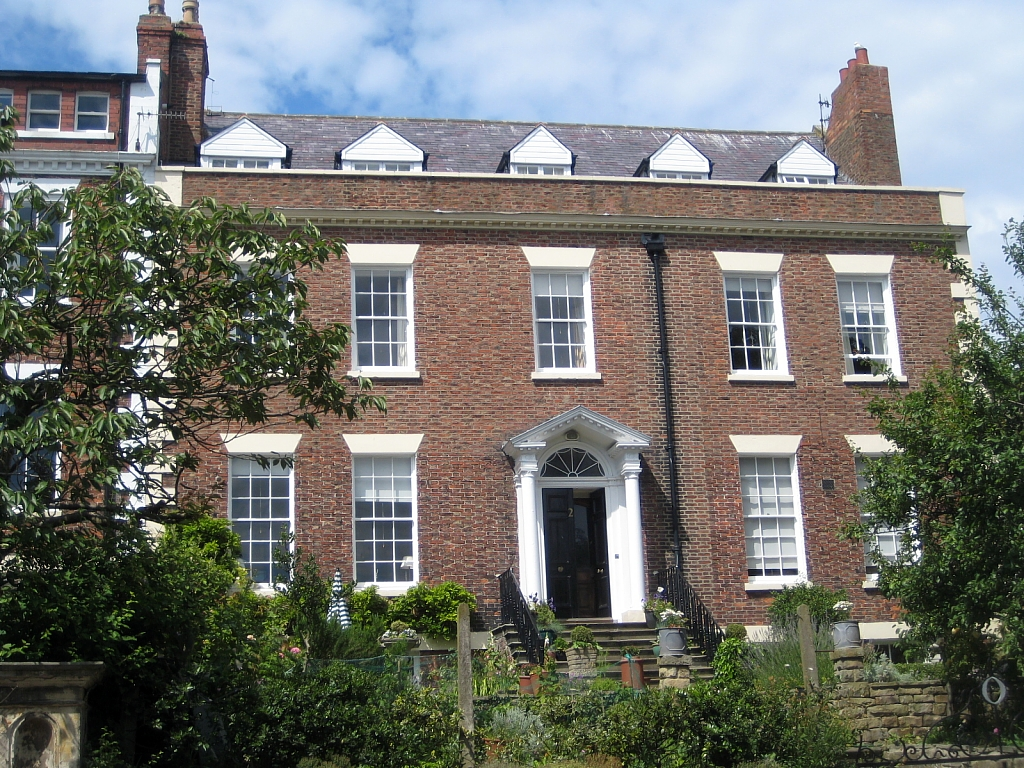
24 St Hilda's Terrace

The house is built of brick, with rusticated quoins, a modillion cornice, a stone capped parapet and a Welsh slate roof. It has two storeys, a basement and attics, and five bays. In the centre, steps lead up to a doorway with Doric columns, a round-arched ornamental fanlight, and an open pediment. The windows are double-hung sashes, and on the attic are five gabled dormers. At the rear is a Venetian window.

=== 25 St Hilda's Terrace ===
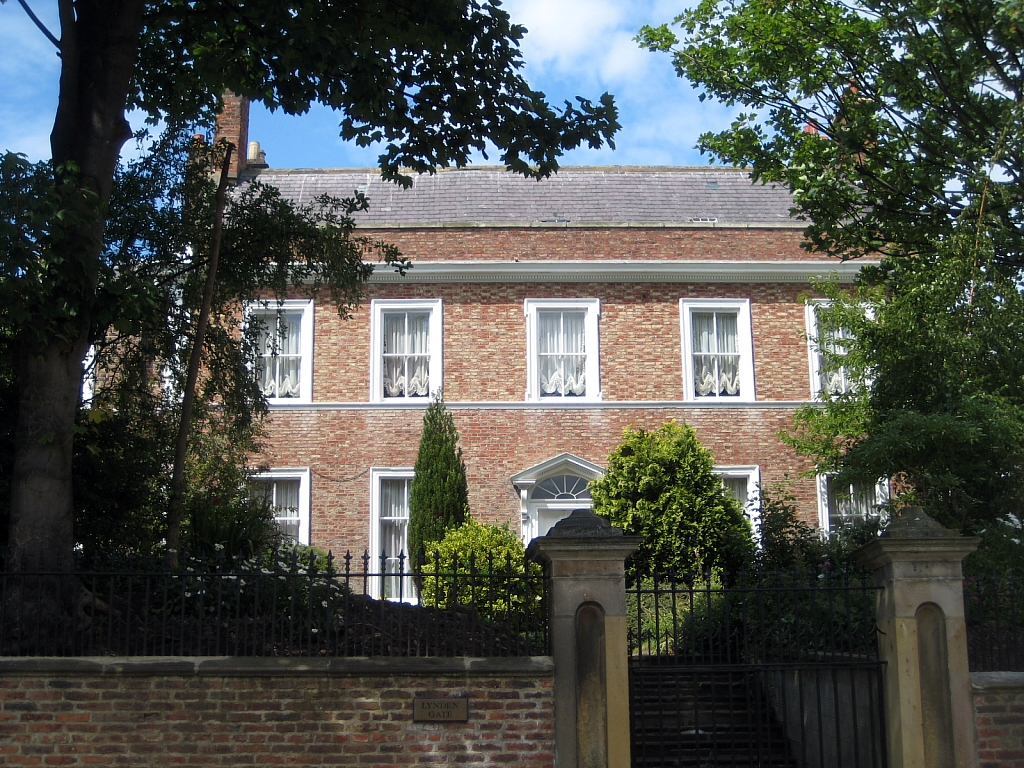
25 St Hilda's Terrace

The house is built of brick, with rusticated quoins, a sill band, a dentilled cornice, a stone capped parapet and a Welsh slate roof. It has two storeys and five bays. In the centre is a doorway with a semicircular radiating fanlight, and an open pediment on consoles. The windows are double-hung sashes in architraves. At the rear is a central doorway with panelled pilasters, a blank fanlight, and an open pediment, above which is a Venetian window.

== See also ==
- Grade II* listed buildings in North Yorkshire (district)
- Listed buildings in Whitby (central area - west)
