= Heslington Church =

Grade II listed church in York, England

Coordinates: 53.94740°N 1.04457°W

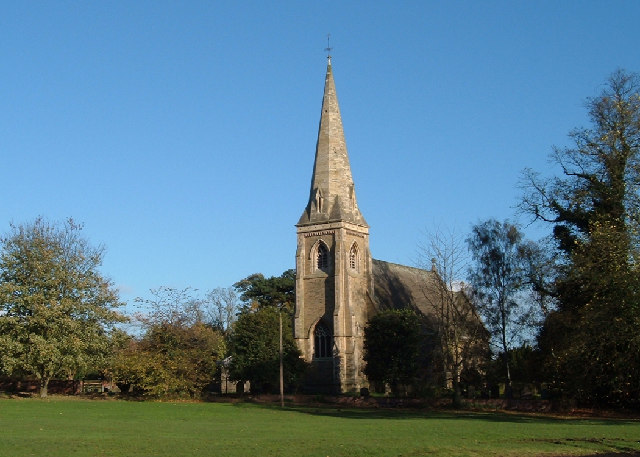
- St Paul's Church, Heslington
- Heslington Church
- OS grid reference: SE 62804 50559
- Location: York
- Country: England
- Denomination: Church of England
- Website: Heslington Church

History
- Dedication: St Paul

Architecture
- Heritage designation: Grade II listed
- Architect(s): J. B. and W. Atkinson (1858); Ronald Sims (1970s)
- Years built: 1858

Specifications
- Capacity: 250

Administration
- Province: Province of York
- Diocese: Diocese of York
- Archdeaconry: York
- Deanery: York
- Parish: Heslington

Clergy
- Vicar: vacant

Heslington Church is in the parish (and village) of Heslington, near York, England. As well as the village and some more modern housing estates, the church also serves some outlying farms. The Heslington campus of the University of York is also in the parish.

It is a local ecumenical partnership between the Church of England and the Methodist Church, making it one of few joint Methodist/Anglican churches. It was formed from Saint Paul's Church, Heslington and Heslington Methodist Chapel in 1971, the name of the combined church being "Heslington Church", though some people still incorrectly refer to it as "St Paul's". The old Methodist Chapel is now the village meeting room.

== History ==
The earliest record of the parish of Heslington is in 1299; it was from that time until 1842 subject to the peculiar jurisdiction of the Prebend of Ampleforth. The advowson passed to the Archbishop of York in 1842.

Originally constructed in 1858, the building still looks like a Victorian parish church from the south. It was extended in the 1970s by the ecclesiastical architect Ronald Sims; he removed the old north wall, and added a modern suite of meeting rooms, including a vestry and kitchen, on the north side. The old choir and sanctuary now form a separate chapel, and the congregation sits in a semicircle facing the new altar to the north. Sims's design makes use of exposed breeze blocks and concrete lintels which are not to everyone's taste. The building is now a Grade II listed building.

Each denomination in the ecumenical partnership is represented by a member of clergy; the Anglican vicar was Rev. Adam Romanis, also vicar of St. Lawrence's Church on Lawrence Street, from 2020 until his retirement in August 2024. The Rev'd Dr. John Schofield, Methodist chaplain to the University of York, represents the Methodist Church. Services are conducted from a combined liturgy, written by the church.

== Services and meetings ==
Sunday services take place at 10.00 a.m. Aside from the usual midweek meetings, the church also plays host to various university groups throughout the week.

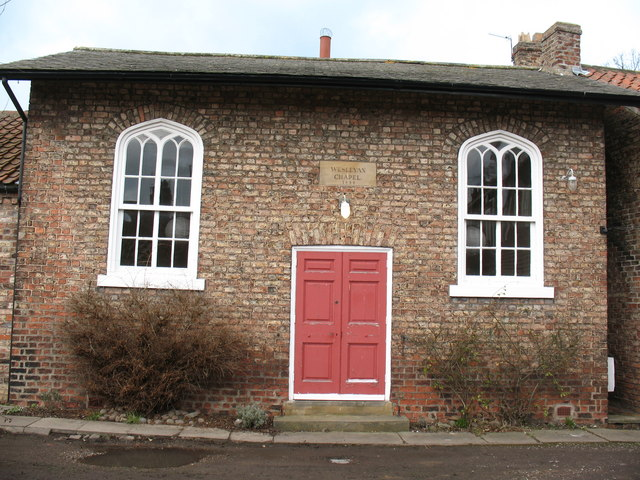
The former Methodist Chapel, now the Heslington Meeting Room
