= 38 Flowergate =

Building in Whitby, North Yorkshire, England

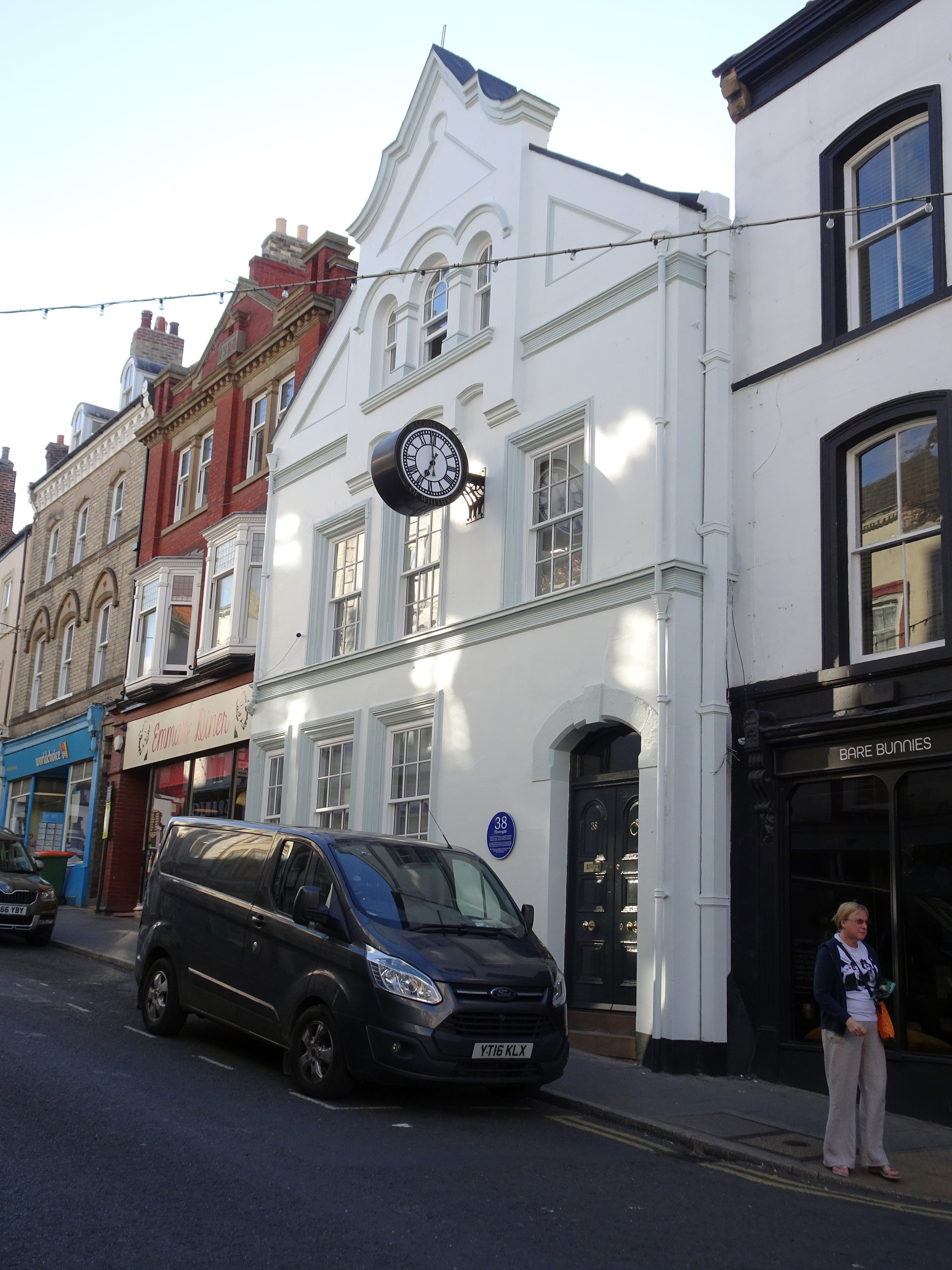
- The building in 2022

- Location within North Yorkshire

General information
- Location: Whitby, North Yorkshire, England
- Coordinates: 54°29′12″N 0°36′56″W
- Years built: Late 17th and early 18th century
- Renovated: Late 19th century (remodelled)

Listed Building – Grade II
- Official name: 38, Flowergate
- Designated: 5 December 2002
- Reference no.: 1061385

38 Flowergate is a historic building in Whitby, a town in North Yorkshire, England.

A building was constructed on the site in the 16th century, which is believed to have served as a courthouse, house of correction, and gaoler's house. In 1640, a new courthouse and jail was erected where the Old Town Hall now stands, and in 1654 the building on Flowergate was subdivided and let out. The building was reconstructed in the late 17th century, and extended early in the next century. During the 19th century, it served for a while as a police station, then later housed a firm of solicitors. It was remodelled in the late 19th century, the work including a new front to Flowergate. The building was Grade II listed in 2002.

The house is built of rendered stone with pantile roofs. It has two storeys an attic and a basement, a single-storey rear wing with an attic, and a front of three bays. To the right of the ground floor is a segmental-headed doorway with a fanlight and a keystone, and on the left are three sash windows with moulded stucco surrounds and a continuous sill. Above the ground floor is a moulded cornice, and three similar sash windows with a sill band, and between them is a projecting clock. The attic has an outer gable with triangular panels, and in the centre is a taller shaped gable containing three round-arched windows. At the rear are two blocked mullioned and transomed windows. Inside, three ground floor rooms have essentially complete 18th-century panelling. There is an early 18th-century staircase, and the front first floor room also has panelling.

== See also ==
- Listed buildings in Whitby (central area - west)
