= Golden Lions (disambiguation) =

The Golden Lions are a rugby team based in Johannesburg, South Africa.

Golden Lions may also refer to:

- U.S. 106th Infantry Division, an infantry division nicknamed the Golden Lions
- Arkansas-Pine Bluff Golden Lions, University of Arkansas sports teams
- Dowling Golden Lions, college athletic teams in Oakdale, New York
- Tianjin Golden Lions, a Chinese professional basketball team based in Tianjin
- Shandong Golden Lions, a Chinese professional basketball team based in Jinan
- Golden Lions, a Polish film award conferred at the Polish Film Festival

== See also ==
- Golden Lion (disambiguation)
