= St Hilda's Church, Whitby =

Church building in Whitby, North Yorkshire, England

Coordinates: 54.4854°N 0.6172°W

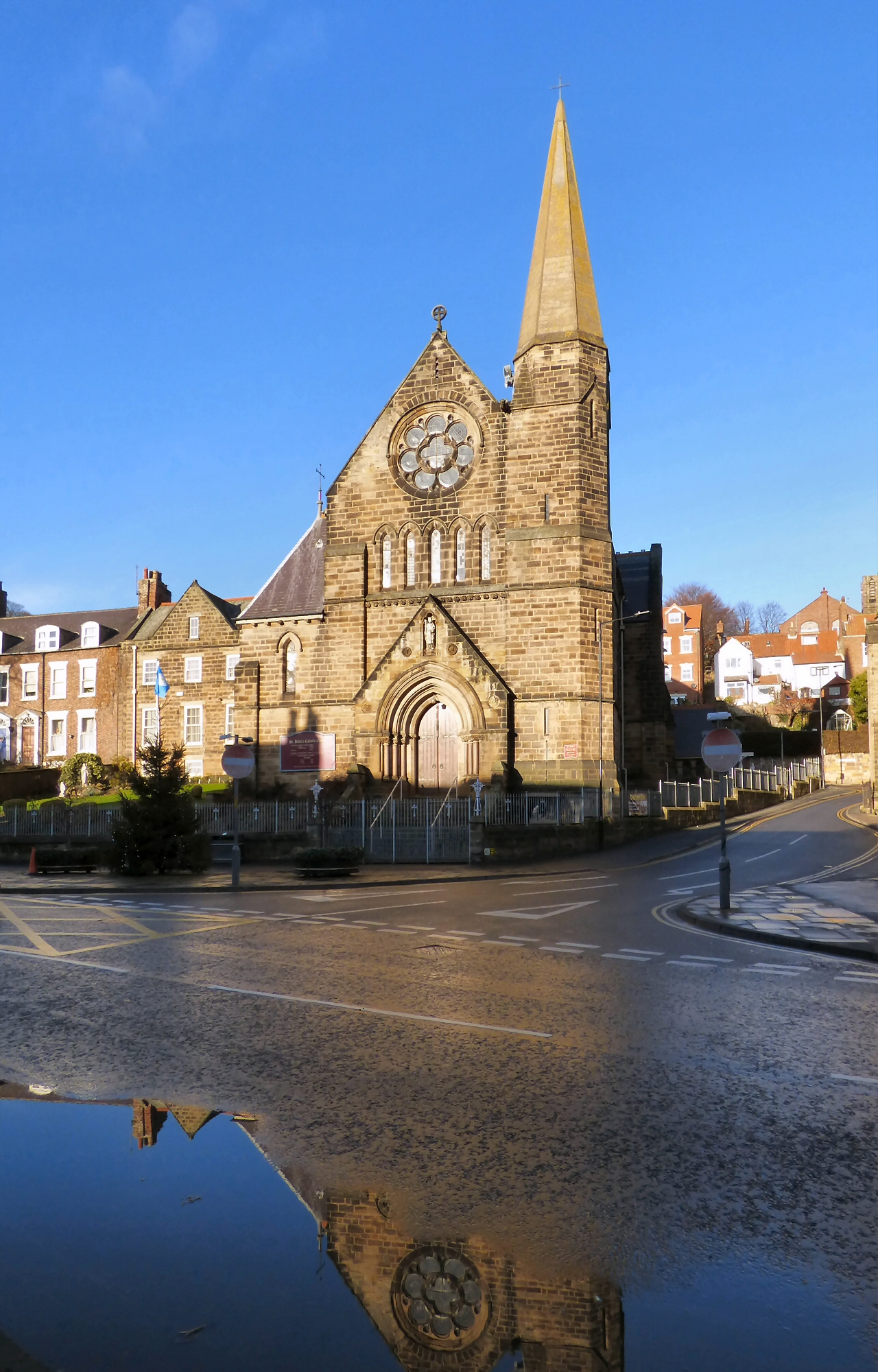
The church, in 2018

St Hilda's Church is a Catholic church in Whitby, a town in North Yorkshire, in England.

A Catholic church was built on Walker Street in Whitby in 1805. In 1867, it was replaced by a new building, facing north, on Victoria Square. It was designed by Matthew Ellison Hadfield, in the 13th-century Gothic style. There is a garden and presbytery next to it. TA Lady Chapel was added in 1890, and the ceiling of the sanctuary was replaced in 1892. The church was consecrated once free from debt, in September 1925. In 1987, the baptistry was converted into the Martyrs' Chapel. The church was grade II listed in 1997.

The church is built of stone and has slate roofs with ridge tiles. It consists of a continuous nave and chancel, narrow side aisles, and a south porch. The west front has a central doorway approached by steps in a gabled porch with a pointed arch with columns, above which is a niche with a statue. Over this is a row of five lancet windows and a round window with a quatrefoil. On the right is an octagonal tower with an octagonal spire. Inside, there is a painted wooden rood screen, the original wooden pews, Minton tile floors, a carved reredos with seven canopies, and a stone altar on marble columns.

== See also ==
- Listed buildings in Whitby (central area - west)
