= St John's Church, Whitby =

Church in Whitby, North Yorkshire, England

Coordinates: 54.4854°N 0.6169°W

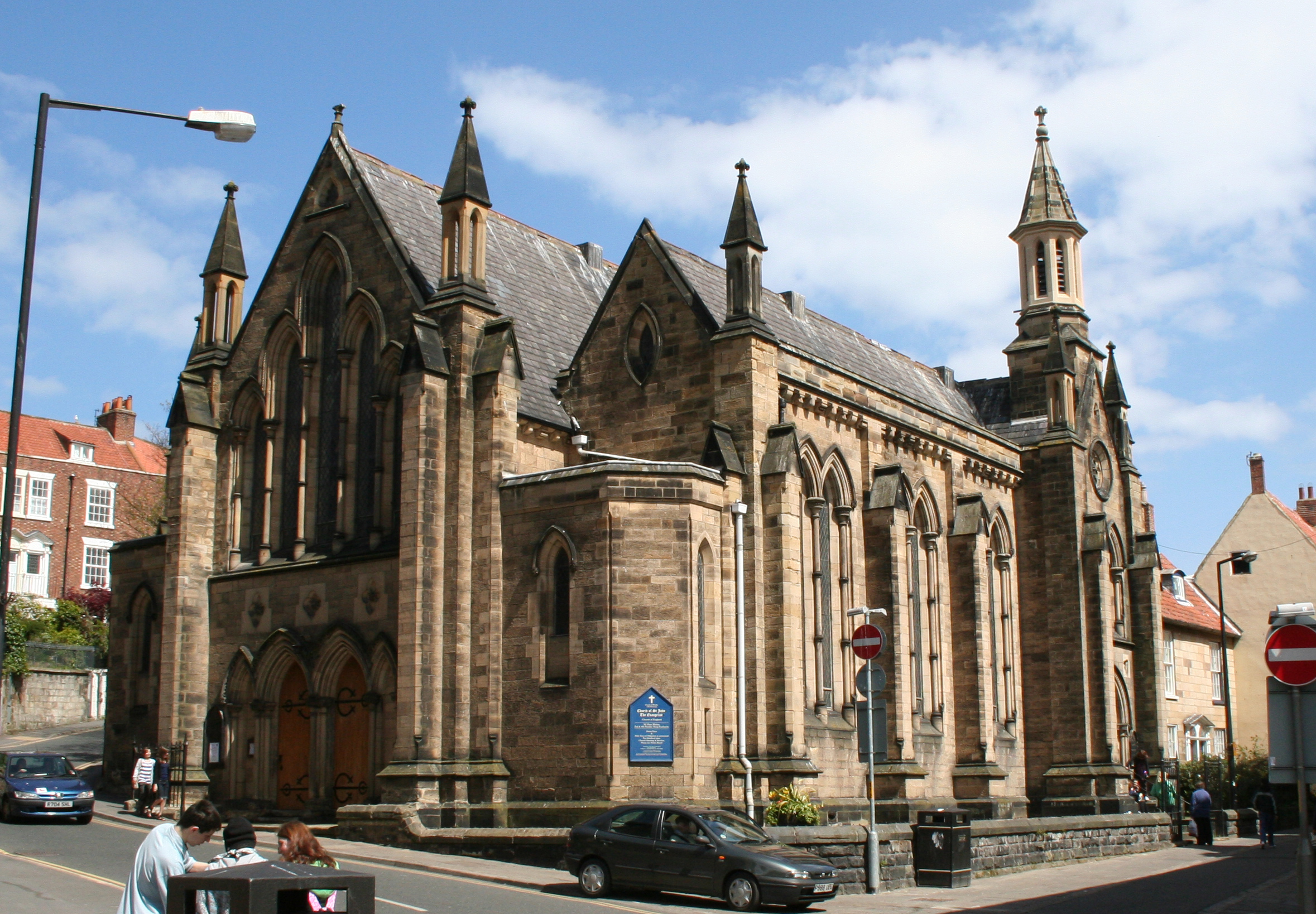
The church, in 2010

St John's Church is an Anglican church in Whitby, a town in North Yorkshire, in England.

The church was built between 1848 and 1849, and was consecrated in 1850. It was designed by J. B. and W. Atkinson in the 13th-century Gothic style. The chancel was altered between 1904 and 1910, and the galleries were moved from the sides to the north end. The changes were designed by Hicks and Charlewood. The building was grade II listed in 1997.

The church is built in stone with slate roofs, and consists of a nave and a chancel under a continuous roof, with side aisles and transepts. Over the west transept is a small octagonal spire. The entrance front has two doorways in pointed moulded arches, with columns and flanking narrow arches. The corners have tall angle buttresses with gables and square pinnacles. Inside, the original wooden pews survive, along with a wooden pulpit, altar and altar rail. There is a reredos with a mosaic depicting the Last Supper, added in 1904, with a gilded fresco above.

== See also ==
- Listed buildings in Whitby (central area - west)
