= Listed buildings in Whitby (central area - west) =

Whitby is a civil parish in the county of North Yorkshire, England. It contains over 470 listed buildings that are recorded in the National Heritage List for England. Of these, nine are listed at Grade I, the highest of the three grades, 25 at Grade II*, the middle grade, and the others are at Grade II, the lowest grade. The parish contains the town of Whitby and the surrounding area, including the village of Ruswarp and the smaller settlement of Ewe Cote.

Whitby has long connections with Christianity since the Synod of Whitby in 664, and the listed buildings most strongly representing this are Whitby Abbey and St Mary's Church, both listed at Grade I. These are both on the east side of the River Esk, where the town first mainly developed largely due to is harbour, the fishing industry and ship building. Most of the listed buildings in this area of the town are houses and cottages, and shops and cafés serving the current tourist industry, many of them crowded closely together due to the limited space available. The town developed on the west side of the town following the arrival of the railway in the 1840s, leading to the growth of the tourist industry here. In addition to hotels, restaurants and shops, many fine houses were built, together with churches and chapels, banks and public buildings.

This list contains the listed buildings in the central part of the town on the west side of the River Esk. Those in the other areas can be found at:

- Listed buildings in Whitby (central area - east)
- Listed buildings in Whitby (outer areas)

== Key ==
Grade	Criteria
I	Buildings of exceptional interest, sometimes considered to be internationally important
II*	Particularly important buildings of more than special interest
II	Buildings of national importance and special interest

== Buildings ==
Name and location	Photograph	Date	Notes	Grade
Bagdale Old Hall; 54.48496°N 0.61774°W		Early 16th century	The house, later a hotel, is in stone with a cornice above the upper floor, and a tile roof with stone-capped gables and kneelers. There are two storeys and attics, and an L-shaped plan, with a main range of two bays, and a gabled cross-wing on the right. The doorway has a segmental head, the windows are mullioned with three or four lights, and on the attics are gabled dormers with two-light mullioned windows.	II*
House at rear of the Marine Hotel; 54.48814°N 0.61485°W		16th century (probable)	The house is in rendered stone, and has a gable and a pantile roof. There are two storeys and attics, and two bays. The door is modern, some windows date from the 19th century and others are modern.	II
1 Wellington Road; 54.48561°N 0.61568°W		17th century (probable)	The shop is on a corner site, and slightly curved on the left. It is in stone, with two storeys and three bays. The left bay contains a shop window, and to the right are two doorways, between which is a casement window. On the upper floor are sash windows and a small window on the left.	II
The Smuggler Café; 54.48568°N 0.61539°W		17th century (probable)	The buildings in the yard at the rear are included. The building is in stone with a steep pantile roof. There are two storeys on the front, and attics, and two bays. On the left is the yard entrance with a four-centred arch and a chamfered surround, and to the right are horizontally sliding sash windows. By the entrance is an old carved male figure in wood.	II
38 Flowergate; 54.48672°N 0.61555°W		Late 17th century	Originally a courthouse, it was refronted in the 19th century and used for other purposes. It is in rendered stone with pantile roofs. There are two storeys an attic and a basement, a single-storey rear wing with an attic, and a front of three bays. To the right of the ground floor is a segmental-headed doorway with a fanlight and a keystone, and on the left are three sash windows with moulded stucco surrounds and a continuous sill. Above the ground floor is a moulded cornice, and three similar sash windows with a sill band, and between them is a projecting clock. The attic has an outer gable with triangular panels, and in the centre is a taller shaped gable containing three round-arched windows. At the rear are two blocked mullioned and transomed windows.	II
10 and 10A Bagdale; 54.48468°N 0.61919°W		17th or 18th century	A pair of houses in stone, with a pantile roof and capped gables. There are two storeys and three bays, and a rear extension in brick. On the left is a doorway with a radiating fanlight and an open dentilled pediment. The windows are sashes, those on the upper floor with keystones, and there are three sloping dormers.	II
7A Brunswick Street; 54.48617°N 0.61594°W	—	17th or early 18th century	A stone cottage with a pantile roof, one storey and an attic, and two bays. The doorway has a plain surround, there are two double-hung sash windows, and on the attic is a sloping dormer with a horizontally siding sash.	II
8 and 8A Brunswick Street; 54.48613°N 0.61604°W		17th or early 18th century	The cottage is in stone with a pantile roof, two storeys and three bays. The doorway is on the upper floor, and is entered from the street by a stone bridge with iron rails. There is one casement window, and the other windows are horizontally sliding sashes.	II
9 Brunswick Street; 54.48608°N 0.61614°W		17th or early 18th century	The cottage is in stone with a pantile roof. There are two storeys and two bays, and a projecting lean-to on the right. The door is modern, there is one horizontally sliding sash window, and the other windows are double-hung sashes.	II
11 Rose and Crown Yard; 54.48632°N 0.61555°W	—	1703	A public house, later a private house, it is rendered and has a pantile roof. There are three storeys and three bays. The doorway is recessed and has a rectangular fanlight, the windows are modern, and there is an inscribed and dated plaque.	II
40 and 41 Flowergate; 54.48677°N 0.61531°W	—	Early 18th century	A pair of shops in painted stone with a pantile roof. There are three storeys and three bays. On the ground floor are late 19th-century and modern shopfronts with tiled stall risers. The upper floors contain sash windows with flush frames.	II
42 Flowergate; 54.48680°N 0.61522°W	—	Early 18th century	The shop is in painted stone with a tile roof. There are three storeys and attics, and three bays. On the ground floor is a modern shopfront with a large fascia. Most of the windows on the upper floors are double-hung sashes with flat arches and flush frames, and a small window has been inserted on the left.	II
West Pier; 54.49181°N 0.61351°W		1734	Work continued on the pier until 1814. It extends toward the north and encloses the west side of the harbour.	II
8 Bagdale; 54.48475°N 0.61858°W		Early to mid-18th century	The house is in brick, with rusticated quoins, a modillion eaves cornice, and a pantile roof. There are two storeys and a basement, and four bays. Steps with iron railings lead up to a Doric portico with a triglyph frieze and a cornice, and to the right are steps down to the basement. The windows are sashes, some horizontally sliding, with grooved lintels and keystones. The forecourt is cobbled.	II
4 Pier Road; 54.48836°N 0.61518°W		1748	A house, later incorporated into a public house, it is rendered and has a pantile roof. There are four storeys and an attic, and two bays. The ground floor projects and contains doors and windows with a balcony above, and on the upper floors are double-hung sash windows with flat stone arches. There is an initialled and dated plaque.	II
Paddock House; 54.48727°N 0.61616°W	—	1748	The house is in stone, with a floor band, a moulded eaves cornice, and a pantile roof. There are two storeys and five bays. The doorway has a Gibbs surround, a rectangular fanlight, and a dated and initialled keystone. The middle window on the upper floor has a stone surround.	II
17 Baxtergate; 54.48607°N 0.61464°W	—	18th century	The shop is in brick, with stone dressings, rusticated quoins, a floor band, and a pantile roof. There are three storeys and three bays. On the ground floor is a modern shopfront, and the upper floors contain double-hung sash windows in flush frames, those on the middle floor with flat brick arches and keystones.	II
46 and 47 Baxtergate; 54.48547°N 0.61636°W	—	18th century	A pair of rendered houses, with three storeys and three bays, and a two-storey extension at the rear. The doorway on the left has pilasters, a cornice and a small hood, and in the centre is a passage entry. The windows are double-hung sashes.	II
48 and 48A Baxtergate; 54.48551°N 0.61620°W	—	18th century	A shop with living accommodation above in brick, with stone dressings, quoins, a floor band, a cornice and a parapet. There are three storeys and five bays. The ground floor contains two modern shopfronts, between which is a doorway with an architrave and a heavy cornice. On the upper floors are sash windows in flush frames with flat brick arches.	II
5 and 5A Brunswick Street and 6 Morrison's Yard; 54.48627°N 0.61581°W	—	18th century	The building is in painted brick with a hipped pantile roof and three storeys. On the left is a doorway, and steps lead down on the right to a lower doorway and a small shop window. The windows are sashes; those in the lower two floors are paired.	II
7 Brunswick Street; 54.48621°N 0.61591°W	—	18th century	A house in painted brick with floor bands and a hipped pantile roof. There are two storeys and two bays. The doorway is recessed, and has an architrave and a segmental head, and the windows are double-hung sashes with flat arches.	II
21 Cliff Street; 54.48683°N 0.61551°W	—	18th century	The house is rendered and has a pantile roof. There are two storeys, attics and a basement, and one bay. Steps with an iron rail lead up to the doorway, and the windows are double-hung sashes.	II
1 Elm Yard; 54.48564°N 0.61613°W	—	18th century	The house is rendered, and has a pantile roof, two storeys and an attic. There is a plain doorway, a fixed window with one opening light on each floor, and a dormer.	II
2 and 3 Elm Yard; 54.48568°N 0.61618°W	—	18th century	A pair of houses in painted brick with a pantile roof. There are two storeys and attics, and each house has one bay. On the front are two doorways, one with narrow grooved pilasters, a blocked radial fanlight, and a semicircular hood on brackets. The windows are double-hung sashes in moulded frames, and there are two dormers.	II
3 Flowergate; 54.48678°N 0.61463°W		18th century	The shop is in brick, with rusticated quoins, a cornice and a tile roof. There are three storeys and an attic, and one bay. The ground floor has a modern shopfront, on the middle floor is a canted oriel window, the top floor contains two sash windows, and on the attic is a gabled half-dormer.	II
3A and 3B Flowergate; 54.48675°N 0.61473°W	—	18th century	The shop has been refaced in stone and has a Welsh slate roof. There are three storeys and attics, and four bays. The ground floor has a shopfront with fluted pilasters, one of them Ionic, two doorways, one with a rectangular fanlight, and a continuous fascia. On the upper floors are sash windows in moulded frames, and above are gabled dormers.	II
4 Flowergate; 54.48671°N 0.61487°W	—	18th century	The shop is in brick with a moulded modillion cornice and a parapet. There are three storeys and three bays. The ground floor has a modern shopfront, and the upper floors contain sash windows in moulded architraves with flat stone arches.	II
5 Flowergate; 54.48670°N 0.61496°W	—	18th century	The shop is rendered, and has a moulded cornice, a parapet and a pantile roof. There are three storeys and three bays. On the ground floor is a shopfront with fluted pilasters and a central doorway, and a plain doorway on the left. The middle floor contains two canted oriel windows, with pediments and panelled bases, and on the top floor are three sash windows in moulded architraves.	II
8 Flowergate; 54.48655°N 0.61537°W	—	18th century	The shop is in rendered stone, with rusticated quoins and a Welsh slate roof. Three are three storeys and two bays. The ground floor contains 19th-century and modern shopfront, and on the upper floors are sash windows in moulded wooden frames.	II
9–12 Flowergate; 54.48656°N 0.61548°W	—	18th century	A row of four rendered shops with sill bands, one with a dentilled cornice, most with parapets, and all with pantile roofs. There are two storeys and each shop has two bays. On the ground floor are 19th-century and modern shopfronts, and a doorway with a blocked Gothic fanlight and an open pediment. The upper floor contains double-hung-sash windows in moulded architraves.	II
House at rear of 19 Flowergate; 54.48633°N 0.61641°W	—	18th century	The house is in stone and has a pantile roof with kneelers. There are two storeys and one bay. On the ground floor is a modern door and a fixed window with one opening light, and the upper floor contains a double-hung sash window.	II
21 Flowergate; 54.48639°N 0.61660°W	—	18th century	The shop, which was refronted in the 19th century, is rendered, and has a sill band, and a moulded eaves cornice. There are three storeys and an attic, and two bays. The ground floor has a modern shopfront, the upper floors contain sash windows in moulded architraves, and above is a dormer.	II
33 Flowergate; 54.48663°N 0.61586°W	—	18th century	The building is in brick with sill bands and a pantile roof. There are three storeys and two bays. The ground floor contains shopfront, and a doorway to the right with panelled pilasters and a hood on decorative brackets. On the upper floors are sash windows in moulded frames.	II
47 and 48 Flowergate; 54.48691°N 0.61474°W	—	Mid-18th century	A pair of shops in brick with rusticated quoins, stone floor bands, an eaves cornice and a pantile roof. There are three storeys and five bays. On the left is a 19th-century shopfront, to the right is a modern shopfront, and between them is a passageway with a rusticated arch and a triple keystone. The upper floors contain double-hung sash windows with painted brick arches and keystones. At the rear is a two-storey wing with an overhang above the ground floor.	II
47A Flowergate; 54.48703°N 0.61487°W	—	18th century	The building is rendered and has a pantile roof. There are two storeys and attics, and two bays. The doorway is modern, and the windows are double-hung sashes with wooden architraves.	II
48A Flowergate; 54.48702°N 0.61478°W	—	18th century	The building has a rendered ground floor, the upper floor is in brick, overhanging on wood bressumers. There are two storeys, and a modern door. The ground floor has fixed windows with openings lights, and above is a sash window and a modern window.	II
49 Flowergate; 54.48695°N 0.61463°W		18th century	The shop is in brick, with a floor band, a parapet, and a pantile roof. There are three storeys and one bay. On the ground floor is a shopfront with modern glazing, and the upper floors contain double-hung sash windows with flat stone arches.	II
50 Flowergate; 54.48697°N 0.61455°W		18th century	The shop is in brick, the basement rendered, with quoins, sill bands, a parapet and a pantile roof. There are three storeys and a basement, and three bays. The basement has a door and a shop window, and on the ground floor is a doorway with fluted pilasters, a blank fanlight, and an open pediment. To its right are two windows, and to its left is a passage entry. The upper floors contain double-hung sash windows.	II
3 and 4 Gardiner's Yard; 54.48622°N 0.61659°W	—	18th century	Both houses have a pantile roof and a panelled door. No 3 is in brick, the ground floor rendered, with two storeys and one bay. The window is fixed, with one opening light. No 4 has a rendered ground floor, and the upper floor is overhanging on wooden beams. There is a rendered porch, and each floor has a three-light double-hung sash window.	II
3 and 4 Hall's Place; 54.48645°N 0.61521°W	—	18th century	A pair of houses in brick with a pantile roof. There are two storeys, a basement and attics, and four bays. Steps with an iron balustrade lead up to paired central doorways with three-light fanlights. The basement and ground floor have segmental-headed windows. Above, the left house has modern windows, and the right house has double-hung sash windows.	II
9 and 9A Hall's Place; 54.48643°N 0.61541°W	—	18th century	A pair of houses in stone, the ground floor rendered, with a pantile roof. There are two storeys, attics and a partial basement, and two bays. There are two doors, one with a foot scraper. The windows are double-hung sashes in moulded frames, and there are two dormers.	II
5 Horngarth and 7 Skinner Street; 54.48681°N 0.61719°W	—	18th century	Shops with living accommodation, they are rendered, and have a floor band, a modillion cornice, and a tile roof. There are three storeys and five bays. On the ground floor are modern shopfronts. The upper floors contain sash windows in moulded shouldered architraves, those in the middle floor with cornices, and the central window is plain.	II
1 Johnson's Yard; 54.48600°N 0.61544°W	—	18th century	The house is in painted brick with a pantile roof, two storeys and an attic. The doorway has a stone arch, and above it is a fixed window with one opening light under a stone arch, and a dormer.	II
4 and 5 Johnson's Yard; 54.48611°N 0.61561°W	—	18th century	A pair of houses in painted brick with a pantile roof. There are two storeys, basements and attics, and each house has one bay. No 4 has a modern door with a rectangular fanlight and a segmental reveal, a fixed window with one opening light in a segmental reveal, a modern window and a basement window with a segmental arch. No 5 has modern windows and a door in a segmental reveal.	II
4 Leng's Yard; 54.48611°N 0.61546°W	—	18th century	The house is rendered and has a pantile roof. There are two storeys and two bays. It has a modern door, and the windows are fixed with one opening light. in flush frames.	II
5 Leng's Yard; 54.48614°N 0.61555°W	—	18th century	The building is in brick and has a pantile roof. There is one story, a basement and an attic, and two bays. The doorway is approached by steps, and there is a basement door. The windows are double-hung sashes and there is a half-dormer.	II
1-4 Linskill Square; 54.48533°N 0.61603°W	—	18th century	A row of four houses in painted brick with a pantile roof. There are two storeys ad attics, and six bays. The left doorway has a rectangular fanlight, and the others are under relieving arches. On the top floor are fixed windows with one opening light, and the ground floor has a mix of similar windows, a sash window and a casement window, all under relieving arches. Each house has a sloping dormer.	II
8 and 9 Linskill Square; 54.48536°N 0.61622°W	—	18th century	A pair of houses in painted brick with a pantile roof. There are two storeys and attics, and each house has one bay. The windows are fixed with one opening light, and the two doorways are plain. The openings on the ground floor have segmental reveals, and there is one sloped dormer.	II
1 Mission Hall Yard; 54.48828°N 0.61555°W	—	18th century	The house is in brick with a pantile roof. There are three storeys and two bays. The doorway is plain, there is one horizontally sliding sash window, one casement window, and the other windows are modern.	II
2 Mission Hall Yard; 54.48828°N 0.61565°W	—	18th century	The house is in brick with a pantile roof. There are two storeys and two bays. The doorway has a quoined surround. Two of the windows are sashes, two are modern, and there is a dormer.	II
2 and 3 Oyston's Yard; 54.48676°N 0.61595°W	—	18th century	A pair of houses in stone, partly rendered, with a pantile roof. There are two storeys and attics. The doors are plain, the windows are irregular, and there are two dormers.	II
4 Oyston's Yard; 54.48686°N 0.61601°W	—	18th century	The house is in painted brick, partly rendered, and has a pantile roof with stone kneelers. There are two storeys and two bays. The windows are fixed with one opening light.	II
1 and 2 Pier Lane; 54.48820°N 0.61521°W	—	18th century	The building is in stone, partly rendered, and has a pantile roof. The front on The Cragg has two storeys and one bay. It contains a modern door with a sloped hood on carved consoles, and a double-hung sash window in a moulded flush frame. The Haggersgate front has four storeys and seven bays. On the ground floor is a garage door, and a doorway with a blocked ornamental fanlight and an open pedimented hood. On the upper floors, most of the windows are sashes.	II
4 Pier Lane; 54.48824°N 0.61546°W	—	18th century	The house is rendered and has a pantile roof. There are two storeys, a basement and attics. Some windows are modern, some are horizontally sliding sashes, and there is a dormer.	II
14 Pier Road; 54.48907°N 0.61502°W		18th century	The building is rendered, and has a sill band, a cornice, a parapet and a pantile roof. There are two storeys, a basement and an attic, and three bays. In the centre, a flight of ten steps with iron railings leads up to a doorway with pilasters, a rectangular fanlight and an entablature. This is flanked by bowed oriel windows, and above it is a single-light window, which is flanked by three-light windows with mullions. The basement has two three-light windows, and on the attic are two dormers.	II
15 and 16 Pier Road; 54.48918°N 0.61499°W		18th century	Two rendered buildings with pantile roofs. The left building has three storeys and attics and three bays, the right is lower with two storeys and attics and two bays. Both buildings have shopfronts on the ground floor, The windows on the upper floors have moulded frames, and above are dormers.	II
23 Pier Road; 54.48946°N 0.61488°W	—	18th century	The building is rendered, and has floor bands and a Welsh slate roof. There are three storeys and three bays. The ground floor has a projecting shopfront, and on the upper floors are sash windows, and above is a dormer with a horizontally sliding sash window.	II
2–4 Ripley's Yard; 54.48578°N 0.61612°W	—	18th century	A row of three houses in stone, the side in brick, with two storeys and one bay to each house. The doorways have rectangular fanlights, most of the windows are double-hung sashes with stone arches, and there are small modern windows.	II
22 and 23 Silver Street; 54.48735°N 0.61685°W	—	18th century	A pair of houses in painted red brick with a modillion eaves cornice and a tile roof. There are two storeys, attics and basements, and five bays. In the centre, steps with iron railings lead up to paired doorways with pilasters and a pediment, and to the left is a modern shopfront. The windows are sashes, paired and narrower over the doorways, with flat stone arches, and there are two gabled dormers.	II
1 Skinner Street; 54.48665°N 0.61713°W	—	18th century	The shop is rendered on a plinth, with sill bands and a Welsh slate roof. There are three storeys and attics, and three bays. On the ground floor is a shop window and a doorway to the left, the upper floors have double-hung sash windows with architraves, and there are two gabled dormers with decorative bargeboards and finials.	II
9 Skinner Street; 54.48689°N 0.61721°W	—	18th century	The shop is in painted brick with an eaves cornice, three storeys and two bays. On the ground floor is a shopfront with four Doric panelled pilasters, and to the left is a doorway with a rectangular fanlight. The upper floors contain sash windows.	II
13 Skinner Street; 54.48710°N 0.61732°W	—	18th century	A shop on a corner site in rendered brick with a pantile roof. There are two storeys and four bays. On the ground floor is a shopfront, and the upper floor contains windows, all modern.	II
19 Skinner Street; 54.48726°N 0.61739°W	—	18th century	The shop is in brick, rendered on the front, with a pantile roof. There are two storeys and an attic and one wide bay. On the ground floor is a modern shopfront, above are paired sash windows, and a flat-roofed dormer.	II
21 and 23 Skinner Street; 54.48733°N 0.61741°W	—	18th century	The shop is rendered and has a pantile roof. There are two storeys and an attic, and two bays. On the ground floor is a late 19th-century shopfront with a panelled stall riser, and to the left is a carriage arch. The upper floor has sash windows, one over the arch and two paired windows over the shopfront, and above is a flat-roofed dormer.	II
27 Skinner Street; 54.48752°N 0.61747°W	—	18th century	The house is rendered, on a plinth and has a Welsh slate roof. There are three storeys and five bays. The central doorway has pilasters, an ornamental semicircular fanlight and an open pediment. The outer bays of the middle floor contain oriel windows, each with three canted lights and lead roofs, and the other windows are sashes.	II
29–33 Skinner Street; 54.48764°N 0.61755°W	—	18th century	A row of three shop in brick with pantile roofs. There are two storeys and eight bays, the left three bays slightly lower. The ground floor contains modern decorative shopfronts and a passage door to the left, and on the upper floor are sash windows.	II
41 and 43 Skinner Street; 54.48792°N 0.61764°W	—	18th century	A pair of houses in stone on a plinth, with a floor band, an eaves cornice, and a slate roof with kneelers. There are two storeys and two bays. In the centre are paired doorways in a common moulded architrave. The windows are sashes with keystones, and there are two dormers.	II
15 Smugglers Yard; 54.48546°N 0.61524°W	—	18th century	The house has three storeys and an attic, the first floor overhanging. The ground floor is rendered, and above the house is in brick. On the ground floor, steps lead to a double door, and there is a casement window. Above are double-hung sash windows and an attic window.	II
4 Staffordshire Place; 54.48667°N 0.61639°W	—	18th century	The house is in brick with a pantile roof. There are two storeys and two bays. It has a plain door, and the windows are mullioned and transomed, with one opening light.	II
9 St Anns Staith; 54.48719°N 0.61421°W	—	18th century	A rendered shop with a coved eaves cornice and a slate roof. There are three storeys and attics, and two bays. The ground floor contains a shopfront and a yard entry on the right. On the middle floor are two rectangular oriel windows with panelled bases, plain pilasters, a moulded frieze, and a cornice with a pedimented centre. The top floor contains two sash windows with moulded architraves, a frieze and a pediment, and above are two gabled dormers.	II
10–13 The Cragg; 54.48910°N 0.61514°W	—	18th century	A row of stone houses with a pantile roof and two storeys. Some of the doorways have a sloped hood on consoles. The windows vary: some are double-hung ashes, some are casements, and some are modern.	II
17 and 18 The Cragg; 54.48935°N 0.61506°W	—	18th century	A pair of rendered houses, one on a plinth, with a pantile roof and stone kneelers. There are two storeys, three doorways and a central passage. The windows are double-hung sashes, and there are two semi-dormers.	II
34 The Cragg; 54.48937°N 0.61495°W	—	18th century	The building is rendered and has a pantile roof. There are two storeys and two bays. The windows are modern, and there are three doorways.	II
1 and 2 Victoria Place; 54.48471°N 0.61707°W	—	18th century	A pair of houses in brick with stone dressings, rusticated quoins, a sill band, and a string course. There are three storeys and attics, and four bays. Steps lead up to two doorways with paired fanlights and a single lintel, and there are doorways under the steps. Most of the windows are sashes, and on the attic are three flat-headed dormers with casements.	II
9 Victoria Square; 54.48496°N 0.61747°W	—	18th century	The house is in brick with a sill band and a slate roof. There are two storeys and an attic, and two bays. On each bay is a two-storey bow window with sash windows and pointed lead roofs. On the attic are two gabled semi-dormers with kneelers.	II
Black Swan Inn; 54.48631°N 0.61448°W		18th century	The public house is in painted brick, with rusticated quoins, a cornice and a parapet. There are three storeys and four bays. On the ground floor is a public house window, to the right is a doorway with Doric columns, two blocked fanlights, one rectangular and a semicircular one above, and an open pediment, and further to the right is a carriage entrance with a rusticated segmental arch. The windows are double-hung sashes in architraves, with flat stone arches and keystones.	II
Dolphin Cottage and Georgian Cottage; 54.48661°N 0.61652°W	—	18th century	A pair of cottages in painted brick with stone kneelers. There are two storeys and attics, and two bays. The doors are modern in wooden architraves, the windows are mullioned and transomed with one opening light, and there are two dormers.	II
Former Clarence Temperance Hotel; 54.48548°N 0.61600°W		Mid-18th century	The building is in brick, the ground floor painted, and it has rusticated quoins, and a sill band. There are four storeys and four bays. Steps lead down to the doorway on the left that has an architrave, a frieze and a cornice. On the upper floors, the second bay contains blocked windows, and on the other bays are double-hung sashes; all these openings have flat arches.	II
Conservative Club; 54.48792°N 0.61703°W	—	18th century	The building is in red brick, with stone dressings, rusticated quoins, a cornice, and a parapet with ramped ends. There are two storeys and attics, and six bays. On the third bay is a doorway with pilasters, a semicircular fanlight and an open pediment, and at the far left is a passage doorway. The windows are sashes with flat rendered arches, and there are two flat-roofed dormers.	II
Golden Lion Public House; 54.48682°N 0.61410°W		18th century	The front of the public house dates from the late 19th century. It is rendered and has three storeys and two bays. The ground floor has a pub front with Doric pilasters, and a fascia with the name, and above are paired sash windows under segmental arches. The rear is in brick with a small modillion cornice and two storeys. It contains a five-light sash window and a round-arched stair window.	II
Havelock's Shed; 54.48570°N 0.61605°W	—	18th century	The building, which has been converted for residential use, is in painted brick and has a pantile roof. There are two storeys and an attic, and two bays. On the right is a porch, the windows are modern, and there is a flat-roofed dormer.	II
Leesholme; 54.48471°N 0.61908°W		18th century (or later)	The house is in stone, with rusticated quoins, floor bands, a coved eaves cornice, and a tiled mansard roof. There are three storeys and attics, and three bays. The windows are double-hung sashes, and on the attic are three dormers.	II
Mounting block 54.48644°N 0.61631°W		18th century	The mounting block is on the pavement in front of the Little Angel Public House. It is in stone, and consists of three much worn steps.	II
Pier Hotel; 54.48845°N 0.61515°W		18th century	The public house is rendered, it is in brick at the rear, and has a pantile roof. There are three storeys and attics, and two bays, the ground floor extended to the front in stone. The windows on the upper floors are double-hung sashes in architraves, those on the middle floor slightly bowed.	II
Former Star Café; 54.48751°N 0.61449°W	—	18th century	The building on a curved corner site is in stone, with rusticated quoins, sill bands, a cornice and a parapet. There are three storeys and two bays. The ground floor contains a modern curved shopfront, and above are double-hung sash windows. On the middle floor the windows have plain architraves and cornices on consoles, and on the top floor they have shouldered architraves.	II
The Cottage; 54.48589°N 0.61453°W	—	18th century	The house is in painted brick with a pantile roof. There are two storeys and one bay. The doorway has a pedimented hood on consoles, and the windows are fixed with one opening light.	II
The Esk Vaults; 54.48678°N 0.61428°W	—	18th century	The building is in painted brick with a pantile roof. There are three storeys and two bays. On the ground floor is a shopfront with pilasters, and a painted tiled stall riser. The middle floor has a canted oriel window on the left. To the right and on the upper floor are fixed windows with one opening casement.	II
The Port Hole; 54.48570°N 0.61604°W	—	18th century	The house is in stone, the ground floor rendered, and it has a floor band and a pantile roof. There are two storeys and an attic, and one bay. The door is plain, and the window is fixed with one opening light.	II
The Whitby Way; 54.48553°N 0.61585°W		Mid-18th century	The public house is in painted brick on a plinth, with rusticated quoins and floor bands. There are three storeys and three bays. Most of the windows are double-hung sashes.	II
Victoria House; 54.48745°N 0.61651°W	—	18th century	A pair of houses in red brick, with a pantile roof and raised coped gables. There are two storeys and attics and four bays. In the centre is a passage entry, and on the far right is a doorway with a fanlight. The windows are sashes, all the openings have painted lintels, and above are two dormers.	II
12–14 Bagdale; 54.48508°N 0.61940°W		c. 1760	A row of three houses in stone, with rusticated quoins, sill and floor bands, a dentilled cornice, and a blank balustered parapet with vases in niches. There are three storeys and a tall basement, and each house has three bays. Steps lead up to the doorways that have Corinthian columns, round-arched fanlights, and open pediments. The basement windows have square rusticated architraves and triple keystones, those on the lower two grounds have Gibbs surrounds, and on the top floor they have architraves and keystones. The windows above the doorways have Rococo decoration.	II
The Missions to Seamen; 54.48744°N 0.61478°W		c. 1760	The building is in brick on a plinth, the basement rendered, with stone dressings, quoins, floor and sill bands, and a dentilled cornice, There are three storeys and a basement, and five bays, the middle three bays projecting under a dentilled pediment containing an oculus. Projecting from the centre is a porch with Doric columns, an entablature with mutules and guttae, and a dentilled pediment. The windows are sashes, those on the ground floor with Gibbs surrounds and triple keystones. The windows on the upper floors have architraves, those on the middle floor eared, and the central window on the middle floor has a segmental dentilled pediment and a brick apron.	II*
The Old Red House; 54.48530°N 0.61802°W	—	Mid to late 18th century	The house is in brick, and has a parapet with moulded capping, and a roof of Roman tiles. There are two storeys and a basement, and five bays. Steps with iron railings lead up to a central glazed porch. The windows are double-hung sashes with flat stone arches.	II
Walls, The Old Red House; 54.48515°N 0.61796°W	—	Mid to late 18th century	The walls enclosing the forecourt are in brick with stone capping. They contain a pair of square brick gate piers with Gothic panels and flat tops.	II
15 and 16 Bagdale; 54.48514°N 0.61915°W	—	Late 18th century	A pair of houses in brick on a plinth, with floor and sill bands, a cornice, a parapet and a pantile roof. There are two storeys and a basement, and four bays. In the centre, curved steps lead up to paired doorways with rectangular fanlights. The right house has a canted bay window with a modillion cornice, the other windows are double-hung sashes and there are two gabled dormers.	II
17 and 18 Bagdale; 54.48518°N 0.61897°W	—	Late 18th century	A pair of houses in brick, with rusticated quoins, a dentilled cornice, a parapet and a Welsh slate roof. There are three storeys and a basement, and four bays, the middle two bays projecting under a pediment with an oval plaque. Steps lead up to the paired central doorways, there is an oriel window on the ground floor of the right house, and the other windows are double-hung sashes with keystones.	II
22 and 23 Bagdale; 54.48525°N 0.61824°W	—	Late 18th century	A pair of houses in brick with a parapet. There are three storeys and a basement, and four bays. Steps lead up to the central doorways, the left with a glazed porch and a pediment with a swag. The right doorway has pilasters, a radiating semicircular fanlight, and a pediment. Above the doorways are sash windows with keystones, and the outer bays have full-height canted bay windows with keystones. Above are two gabled and two flat-roofed dormers.	II
25 and 26 Bagdale; 54.48534°N 0.61779°W	—	Late 18th century	A pair of houses in brick with a slate roof. There are two storeys, basements and attics, and six bays. Steps lead up to the central doorways; each has pilasters, a radiating fanlight, and an open pediment. The windows are double-hung sashes with flat stone arches, and on the attics are four segmental-headed dormers.	II
23 Baxtergate; 54.48582°N 0.61510°W	—	Late 18th century	The house is in stone with a dentilled cornice and a parapet. There are three storeys and a basement, and four bays. Steps lead up to the doorway that has Doric columns, an architrave, a rectangular fanlight, a triglyph frieze and an open pediment. The windows are double-hung sashes in moulded architraves, those on the ground and middle floors with aprons.	II
10 Brunswick Street; 54.48597°N 0.61628°W	—	Late 18th century	The house is in brick with a parapet and a Welsh slate roof. There are two storeys and five bays. Steps with iron railings lead up to the central doorway that has Doric columns, round entablatures, a semicircular honeysuckle fanlight, and an open pediment, and to the side is an inset foot scraper. The windows are sashes with flat stone arches.	II
5 Cliff Street; 54.48801°N 0.61601°W	—	Late 18th century	The house is in red brick, and has a pantile roof with a raised right gable and a shaped kneeler. There are three storeys and an attic, and one bay. The doorway is on the left, and has a fanlight and a porch with a curved top on a moulded bracket. The windows on the lower two floors are sashes with gauged flat arches, the top floor has a top-hung casement, and on the attic is a dormer. The forecourt is enclosed by a stone wall.	II
6 and 7 Cliff Street; 54.48794°N 0.61599°W	—	Late 18th century	A pair of houses in red brick with a sill band, a dentilled eaves cornice and a Welsh slate roof. There are two storeys and attics, and six bays. The doorways of each house are on the left; the right doorway has fluted Doric pilasters, a radial fanlight with Gothic tracery, and an open pediment. The left doorway has a projecting porch, a fanlight with a segmental head, and a cornice. To its right is a canted bay window, and the other windows are sashes with wedge lintels. Both houses have dormers, the left two are gabled with scalloped bargeboards, and to the right is one with a flat roof. The forecourt is enclosed by a stone wall.	II
13 Haggersgate; 54.48797°N 0.61478°W	—	Late 18th century	The house is in brick, with quoins, a blocking course and a hipped pantile roof. There are two storeys and one bay. On the ground floor is a central sash window with a keystone, to its left is a doorway with pilasters, a flat head and a moulded keystone, and to the right is a round-headed doorway with pilasters and a blocked radial fanlight. Above is a large round-headed window with an archivolt band.	II
16 Haggersgate; 54.48780°N 0.61474°W	—	Late 18th century	The house is in red brick on a plinth, with stone dressings, quoins, floor bands, sill bands, a cornice and a parapet. There are thee storeys and five bays. The outer bays contain doorways, pilasters, a semicircular fanlight, and a round arch with a Gibbs surround. The windows are double-hung sashes, with triple keystones.	II
2, 3 and 4 Newton Street; 54.48592°N 0.61698°W	—	Late 18th century	A row of three brick houses with a parapet and a pantile roof. There are two storeys, a tall basement, and an attic. Steps with iron rails lead up to the doorways that have Ionic pilasters, blank honeysuckle semicircular fanlights, and open pediments, the right two doorways paired and the left single. There is one casement window, the others are double-hung sashes, and above are three flat-topped dormers.	II
8 Silver Street; 54.48708°N 0.61696°W	—	Late 18th century	The house is in chequered red and white brick, the basement rendered, with rendered rusticated quoins, a modillion cornice, and a stone coped parapet. There are two storeys and a basement, and three bays. Steps with iron railings lead up to the central doorway that has an architrave, fluted pilasters, a blocked semicircular fanlight, and a pediment. The windows are sashes with flat stone arches.	II
12 and 13 Silver Street; 54.48756°N 0.61705°W	—	Late 18th century	A pair of houses in red brick with a slate roof. There are two storeys, attics and basements, and five bays. In the centre, steps with wooden rails lead up to paired doorways, flanked by pilasters, with a frieze and an open pediment. The windows are sashes with flat stone arches, and there are two dormers.	II
3 Skinner Street; 54.48672°N 0.61716°W	—	Late 18th century	The shop is in brick, with a band and a pantile roof. There are three storeys and two bays. On the ground floor is a shopfront, the middle floor contains a large canted bay window, and on the top floor are sash windows with flat stone arches.	II
1–6 St Hilda's Terrace; 54.48639°N 0.62114°W		Late 18th century	A terrace of six houses in brick with stone dressings, parapets, and slate or pantile roofs. There are two storeys and attics, and each house has three bays. Over the middle four bays of the central two houses is a dentilled cornice and pediment containing an oval plaque, and this pair of houses is flanked by quoins. Some houses have doorways with fluted pilasters and pediments, and others have plain surrounds. The windows are double-hung sashes, and some houses have dormers.	II*
7–10 St Hilda's Terrace; 54.48633°N 0.62061°W		Late 18th century	A terrace of three houses in brick with stone dressings, parapets, and slate or pantile roofs. There are two storeys and attics, and each house has three bays. The left house has a doorway with a glazed ornamental fanlight, the middle house has a modern door, and the right house has a doorway with pilasters and a plain rectangular fanlight. The right house has a canted bay window, the other windows are sashes, and above are dormers.	II*
Walls between the gardens of 7–10 St Hilda's Terrace; 54.48623°N 0.62054°W	—	Late 18th century	The walls between the gardens ar in brick with stone caps.	II
11 and 12 St Hilda's Terrace; 54.48632°N 0.62026°W	—	Late 18th century	A pair of houses in a terrace in brown brick, with a parapet and a slate roof. There are two storeys and attics, and each house has three bays. The doorways have Doric columns, a semicircular fanlight, and an open pediment. The right house has a curved bay window, the other windows are sashes, and each house has dormers.	II*
Garden wall, 11 and 12 St Hilda's Terrace; 54.48609°N 0.62026°W	—	Late 18th century	The garden wall is in brick.	II
13 and 14 St Hilda's Terrace; 54.48632°N 0.62033°W	—	Late 18th century	A pair of houses in brick with a moulded cornice, a parapet and a pantile roof. There are two storeys and attics, and five bays. In the centre is a doorway with columns, a round-arched fanlight and an open pediment, and the entrance to No 13 is at the rear. The windows are double-hung sashes, and there are three dormers.	II*
Garden wall, 13 and 14 St Hilda's Terrace; 54.48604°N 0.62005°W	—	Late 18th century	The garden wall is in brick with stone capping.	II
15 and 16 St Hilda's Terrace; 54.48630°N 0.61988°W		Late 18th century	A paired house in brick, with stone dressings, rusticated quoins, a floor band, and a dentilled cornice. There are three storeys and five bays. Over the middle three bays is a pediment containing a circular window, on full-height pilasters with fluted caps. The doorways, which are approached by steps, are paired in the centre in a porch with three columns and a balustrade, and they have round heads and radiating fanlights. The windows have architraves, those on the ground floor with square block rustications. The right house has a slate Mansard roof and three dormers.	II*
Wall and gate piers, 15 and 16 St Hilda's Terrace; 54.48602°N 0.61978°W	—	Late 18th century	The wall along the front of the garden is in brick with stone coping. The gate piers are in stone with a square section, Gothic-head panelling, foliated lamp holders and they are surmounted by urns.	II
Wall and gate piers, 17 St Hilda's Terrace; 54.48602°N 0.61947°W	—	Late 18th century	The wall along the front of the garden is in brick with stone coping. The gate piers are in stone with a square section, and surmounted by urns.	II
18 and 19 St Hilda's Terrace; 54.48634°N 0.61931°W	—	Late 18th century	Paired houses in brown brick, with rusticated quoins, a floor band, a cornice and a parapet. There are three storeys and a basement, and five bays. Steps with railings lead up to paired central doorways with panelled pilasters, and semicircular fanlights under a common steep pediment. The left house has a canted bay window, and the other windows are double-hung sashes.	II*
Garden wall, 18 and 19 St Hilda's Terrace; 54.48608°N 0.61921°W	—	Late 18th century	The garden wall is in brick with stone capping.	II
20 St Hilda's Terrace; 54.48635°N 0.61909°W	—	Late 18th century	The house is in brick, with rusticated quoins, sill bands, a cornice, a parapet and a pantile roof. There are two storeys and five bays. In the centre is a doorway with a pediment, it is flanked by bay windows, and the other windows are sashes with rendered arches.	II*
Wall and gate piers, 20 St Hilda's Terrace; 54.48615°N 0.61896°W	—	Late 18th century	The wall along the front of the garden is in brick with stone coping. The gate piers are in stone with a square section, panels on the front, and square capping.	II
21 St Hilda's Terrace; 54.48639°N 0.61855°W		Late 18th century	A large stone house with a floor band, a central entablature with a cornice and a blocking course, and a central panelled parapet with sides ramped up to it. There are two storeys and a basement, and five bays divided by full-height Doric pilasters. The doorway has a segmental head, Doric columns in antis, and a radial fanlight. The windows are double-hung sashes. At the rear are two storeys, and a wide doorway with a Tuscan surround and a complex fanlight.	II*
Wall, 21 St Hilda's Terrace; 54.48625°N 0.61871°W	—	Late 18th century	The wall along the front of the garden is in brick on a stone plinth, and has stone coping.	II
22 St Hilda's Terrace; 54.48646°N 0.61833°W		Late 18th century	The house, at one time an office, is in brick, with rusticated quoins, an iron balcony above the ground floor, sill bands, a cornice, and a parapet with stone capping. There are three storeys, an attic storey above the parapet, and five bays. In the centre is a semicircular porch, and a doorway with a hood on consoles. The windows are double-hung sashes.	II*
23 St Hilda's Terrace; 54.48650°N 0.61812°W		Late 18th century	The house, at one time an office, is in brick, the basement rendered, with quoins, and a dentilled cornice. There are two storeys, a basement and an attic, and five bays, the middle three bays projecting slightly under a dentilled pediment containing a Venetian window with a keystone. In the centre is a Doric doorway with a round-arched fanlight, and an open pediment. The windows are double-hung sashes.	II*
Garden wall, 23 St Hilda's Terrace; 54.48636°N 0.61806°W	—	Late 18th century {probable)	The garden wall is in brick with stone coping.	II
24 St Hilda's Terrace; 54.48651°N 0.61788°W		Late 18th century	The house is in brick, with rusticated quoins, a modillion cornice, a stone capped parapet and a Welsh slate roof. There are two storeys, a basement and attics, and five bays. In the centre, steps lead up to a doorway with Doric columns, a round-arched ornamental fanlight, and an open pediment. The windows are double-hung sashes, and on the attic are five gabled dormers. At the rear is a Venetian window.	II*
Garden wall, 24 St Hilda's Terrace; 54.48639°N 0.61781°W	—	Late 18th century	The garden wall is in brick with stone capping. At the ends are stone piers with round-arched recesses.	II
25 St Hilda's Terrace; 54.48662°N 0.61744°W		Late 18th century	The house is in brick, with rusticated quoins, a sill band, a dentilled cornice, a stone capped parapet and a Welsh slate roof. There are two storeys and five bays. In the centre is a doorway with a semicircular radiating fanlight, and an open pediment on consoles. The windows are double-hung sashes in architraves. At the rear is a central doorway with panelled pilasters, a blank fanlight, and an open pediment, above which is a Venetian window.	II*
Garden wall, 25 St Hilda's Terrace; 54.48644°N 0.61761°W	—	Late 18th century {probable)	The garden wall is in brick with stone capping. On the wall are iron railings that continue as an overthrow above the modern central gates.	II
9 and 11 Upgang Lane; 54.48698°N 0.62362°W		Late 18th century	A pair of cement rendered houses with a tile roof. There are three storeys and a front of four bays. The outer bays contain tripartite sash windows with keystones. In the centre are projecting porches, each with a cornice and a blocking course. Above each porch is a stair window in Venetian-style, with a very tall central light and a keystone. Projecting from the centre of the houses is a single-storey wing, at the end of which is a pediment with an oval panel in the tympanum. At the rear are three bays, the outer bays with full-height canted bay windows, between which are bands, a parapet across both, and a slate roof. In the centre is a glazed porch with four columns.	II
6 Victoria Square; 54.48498°N 0.61715°W	—	Late 18th century	The house is in brick with a parapet and a pantile roof. There are two storeys and two bays. The doorway on the right has a semicircular fanlight and an open pediment, and the windows are double-hung sashes with flat stone arches and keystones.	II
7 and 8 Victoria Square; 54.48497°N 0.61729°W	—	Late 18th century	A pair of houses, later offices, in brick, with a parapet and a pantile roof. There are two storeys and three bays. The doorways are paired in the centre, they are approached by steps, and have plain surrounds and rectangular fanlights. The windows have modern glazing, and above are two flat-topped dormers.	II
19 Wellclose Square; 54.48783°N 0.61821°W	—	Late 18th century	The house is cemented, and has an eaves cornice and a pantile roof. There are two storeys and four bays. The doorway has fluted pilasters, a semicircular radiating fanlight and an open pediment. The windows are double-hung sashes with stone lintels, and there are two dormers.	II
Bagdale Hotel; 54.48488°N 0.61822°W		Late 18th century	The hotel is in red brick, with quoins, a basement band, a sill band, a dentilled cornice, a parapet and a Roman tiled roof. There are two storeys, a basement and attics, and three bays. In the centre, steps with S-scroll balusters lead up to a porch with Doric columns, a dentilled cornice and a pediment. The outer bays contain full-height canted bay windows with casements, and on the attics are flat-roofed dormers.	II
Chocolate Box; 54.48674°N 0.61419°W		Late 18th century	The shop is in painted brick and has a pantile roof. There are two storeys and two bays. On the ground floor are 19th-century and modern shopfronts. The upper floor contains double-hung sash windows, and above is a sloped dormer.	II
George Hotel; 54.48527°N 0.61661°W		Late 18th century	Originally a house, and for a time the station hotel, it is in brick with rusticated quoins, and a dentilled cornice. There are three storeys, basements and attics, and four bays. Steps with iron railings lead up to the central doorway that has Doric columns, a triglyph frieze , and a pediment with mutules and guttae. The windows are sashes in eared architraves, the window above the doorway with a pulvinated frieze, and a dentilled segmental pediment on consoles. On the attics are two shaped dormers.	II
Harold Villa; 54.48759°N 0.61800°W	—	Late 18th century	The house is in brick, with stone dressings, quoins, a cornice and a blocking course. There are three storeys and three bays. The doorway on the left has Doric columns, a radial fanlight and an open pediment. The windows are double-hung sashes under flat stone arches.	II
Manor House; 54.48439°N 0.61918°W	—	Late 18th century	The house is in brick and has a pantile roof, hipped to the road. There are three storeys and four bays. On the front is a doorway, most of the windows are sash windows with flat brick arches, and there are some modern and some blocked windows.	II
Princess Club; 54.48426°N 0.61794°W		Late 18th century	The building is in stone, and has sill bands, a cornice, a parapet, and a hipped grey slate roof. There are two storeys and three bays. The central doorway is approached by stone steps with iron railings, and has pilasters, a semicircular fanlight and an open pediment. The windows are double-hung sashes.	II
Red Gates; 54.48686°N 0.62345°W		Late 18th century	The house is in stone with a moulded eaves cornice and a slate roof. There are three storeys and three bays, and a two-storey single-bay extension on the left. On the left bay is a projecting solid porch with a cornice and a blocking course. Above it is a round-headed stair window. The other windows on the outer bays are double-hung sashes with keystones, and the middle bay contains casement windows of differing sizes. On the rear is a Doric porch.	II
St Hilda; 54.48630°N 0.61956°W	—	Late 18th century	The house is in red brick, with stone dressings, rusticated quoins, and floor and sill bands. There are three storeys and five bays, the middle three bays projecting under a pediment with a round window in the tympanum, and flanked by pilasters. In the centre is a painted glazed porch, and the windows are sashes.	II*
The Haven; 54.48573°N 0.61874°W	—	Late 18th century	The house is in brick on the front and in stone elsewhere, with rusticated quoins, floor bands, a parapet, and a pantile roof. There are two storeys and four bays. The door has a rectangular fanlight and a flat hood on consoles. The windows are double-hung sashes with stone arches, and there is one large dormer.	II
The Star Inn; 54.48771°N 0.61488°W		Late 18th century	The public house is in painted cement on a plinth on the front, and in brick elsewhere, and has sill bands and a parapet. There are three storeys and six bays. The doorway has an eared doorcase, and to the right is a round-headed passage entry with a rusticated surround and a keystone. The windows are sashes with keystones.	II
Thistle Bank; 54.48522°N 0.61876°W	—	Late 18th century	The house is in brick with stone dressings, a sill band, a dentilled cornice, a parapet, and a roof of grey slabs. There are two storeys and a basement, and five bays. Stone steps with iron S-balusters lead up to the central doorway that has pilasters, a semicircular fanlight, and an open pediment. Above the basement windows is a band and keystones. The windows are sashes.	II
Former Whitby and District Workingmans Social Club and Institute; 54.48652°N 0.61698°W		Late 18th century	Originally a mansion on a corner site, it has been much altered and used for other purposes. It is in stone and has a tall mansard roof in Welsh slate. There are three storeys, a basement and attics. On the Flowergate front, the basement and ground floor have been built out as projecting shops with a lounge above. Over this there are five bays with quoins, a dentilled cornice and a parapet, the middle three bays projecting slightly under a dentilled pediment containing a circular window. The other windows are sashes, those in the middle floor with eared architraves and a cornice, the outer and central windows with pediments. On the top floor are sash windows in architraves, and in the centre is a Diocletian window with a keystone. The Skinner Street front is rendered on a plinth, and has five bays, floor bands, and a doorway with a segmental head. The upper two floors of the outer bays have two-storey canted oriel windows. The other windows are sashes, those in the lower two floors with segmental heads. Both fronts have dormers with segmental heads.	II
Hunters Lodge; 54.48712°N 0.61703°W	—	1776	The house is rendered, with a front of two storeys and attics, and seven bays. It contains two doorways with divided fanlights, some windows are blind, and the other are sashes. The left return has two storeys and a basement, and a full-height bow, with sill bands, a cornice and a parapet. On the basement is a doorway, and the windows are double-hung sashes.	II
St Ninian's Church; 54.48608°N 0.61511°W		1776–78	The chancel was added to the church in 1890. The church is in brick, and consists of a nave with an internal porch, and a chancel with an apsidal sanctuary. The doorway is approached by two flights of steps with iron railings. It has jambs with shafts, a dentilled cornice, a semicircular fanlight, a keystone, and an open pediment on consoles. It is flanked by three-light windows with pointed arches, and there is a similar half-window above, over which is a gable containing a circular window.	II*
1 Abbey Inn Yard; 54.48632°N 0.61641°W	—	Late 18th or early 19th century	The house is in stone with a pantile roof, and two storeys and an attic. It contains a fixed window with one opening light above a three-light horizontally sliding window, and a sloped dormer.	II
2 Abbey Inn Yard; 54.48628°N 0.61640°W	—	Late 18th or early 19th century	The house is in rendered brick, and has two storeys and attics and two bays. The ground floor has a plain door and a fixed window with one opening light, both under slightly segmental arches, and one small window to the right. On the upper floor are double-hung sash windows, and above is a sloped dormer.	II
3 Abbey Inn Yard; 54.48624°N 0.61639°W	—	Late 18th or early 19th century	The house is in painted brick, and has two storeys and attics and two bays. The ground floor has a plain door and a sash window, and on the upper floor is a double-hung sash window and a modern window. All the openings have brick arches.	II
8 Abbey Inn Yard; 54.48627°N 0.61629°W	—	Late 18th or early 19th century	The house is in whitewashed stone, rendered on the side, with a pantile roof. There are two storeys and two bays. The door has a flat wooden hood on brackets. On the upper floor are a double-hung sash window and a two-light mullioned window, and on the ground floor are modern windows.	II
14 and 15 Cliff Street; 54.48732°N 0.61575°W	—	Late 18th to early 19th century	A pair of shops in brick with rusticated quoins and a pantile roof with stone kneelers. There are two storeys and attics, and four bays. Each shop has an early 19th-century shop window with pilasters, a frieze and a cornice, and to the right of each is a doorway with a rectangular fanlight. On the upper floor are two sash windows; the windows and doorways have flat stone arches, and on the attic are dormers.	II
1 and 2 Hall's Place; 54.48648°N 0.61523°W	—	Late 18th to early 19th century	The house is rendered and has a pantile roof. There are two storeys, an attic and a basement, and one bay. The doorway is plain, in the basement is a fixed window, above is a double-hung sash window, and there is a dormer.	II
5–7 Princess Place; 54.48454°N 0.61713°W	—	Late 18th to early 19th century	A row of three houses in brick, with pantile roofs and stone kneelers. There are two storeys and attics and three bays. Two doorways have a pedimented hood on carved consoles, one has a blocked semicircular fanlight, and two have relieving arches of brick headers. The upper floor windows are in segmental-headed recesses.	II
6 and 7 Silver Street; 54.48699°N 0.61692°W	—	Late 18th to early 19th century	A row of three shops in brick with a pantile roof. There are two storeys and attics and three bays. On the ground floor are three shopfronts with rendered stall risers flanking a passage entry. The upper floor contains sash windows, and there are three sloped dormers.	II
Cobbles with centre drain, Linskill Square; 54.48528°N 0.61608°W		18th or early 19th century (probable)	The court is cobbled, and has a central drain.	II
St Hilda's Rectory; 54.48542°N 0.61765°W		1805	The rectory is in stone, with quoins, a sill band, and a Welsh slate roof with red ridge tiles. There are three storeys, a basement and an attic, three bays, and a gable on the front. The windows are double-hung sashes, and the doorway with a rectangular fanlight is in a recessed bay on the right.	II
The Old Unitarian Chapel; 54.48672°N 0.61446°W	—	1812	The chapel is in red brick. The doorway has a round head and a glazed fanlight, there are two round-arched windows, and a smaller one above the doorway.	II
2 and 3 Bagdale; 54.48492°N 0.61799°W		Early 19th century (probable)	A pair of houses in brick, with floor and sill bands and a parapet. There are two storeys, a basement and attics, and three bays. Steps with iron rails lead up to paired central doorways with pilasters, rectangular fanlights, and a common cornice. Above the doorways are double-hung sashes, on the outer bays are full-height canted bay windows, and on the attics are one flat-topped and two gabled dormers.	II
20 and 21 Bagdale; 54.48522°N 0.61848°W		Early 19th century	The house is in stone, with floor and sill bands, angle pilasters, a cornice, a blocking course, and a central decorative feature. There are three storeys and five bays. Steps lead up to a central Greek Doric portico with columns and pilasters, and a doorway with a semicircular fanlight. The windows are sashes, the window above the portico has a cornice on consoles, the window above that has shouldered architrave, and above are gabled dormers.	II
44 and 45 Baxtergate; 54.48548°N 0.61653°W		Early 19th century	A pair of stone houses with a cornice and a pantile roof. There are two storeys and attics, and two bays. The doorways are paired in the centre, and have pilasters, radiating round-headed fanlights, and a common dentilled open pediment. On the upper floor are double-hung sash windows, and above are two segmental-headed dormers with casements.	II
61 Baxtergate; 54.48599°N 0.61524°W		Early 19th century	The shop is in rendered brick with a cornice, a parapet, and a pantile roof. There are three storeys and two bays. On the ground floor is a 19th-century shopfront with pilasters and an entablature, and to the left is a doorway with a blocked fanlight. The upper floors contain double-hung sash windows with flat arches.	II
2 and 3 Brunswick Street; 54.48641°N 0.61588°W	—	Early 19th century	A pair of shops in painted brick with sill bands and a cornice. There are four storeys and two bays. On the ground floor are two shopfronts, and above are sash windows with flat stone arches.	II
4 Brunswick Street; 54.48628°N 0.61581°W	—	Early 19th century	A shop in painted brick with a sill band and a modillion eaves cornice. There are three storeys and two bays. The ground floor contains a shopfront and a passage entry to the left, and above are sash windows.	II
1 Cliff Street; 54.48820°N 0.61604°W	—	Early 19th century	The house is in red brick with rendered gable ends, and a pantile roof with raised gables and brick capping. There are two storeys and tall basement, and two bays. The basement area has a stone wall that is bridged by steps and a landing with iron railings leading to the front door. Above the door is a horizontally sliding sash window with a wedge lintel. The right bay contains bow windows on each floor.	II
4 Cliff Street; 54.48804°N 0.61606°W	—	Early 19th century	The house is in red brick and has a stone capped parapet with iron railings above. There are two storeys and two bays. On the left bay is a two-storey canted bay window. Steps lead up to a doorway with a fanlight in the right bay, above it is a blind window, and both have wedge lintels. The forecourt is enclosed by a stone wall.	II
34 and 35 Cliff Street; 54.48763°N 0.61572°W	—	Early 19th century	A pair of houses in painted brick, the ground floor rendered, with a pantile roof and stone kneelers. There are three storeys and two bays. In the centre is a pair of doorways, with three grooved pilasters, under a common open pediment, and to the right is an inset foot scraper. The windows are mixed; most are sashes.	II
40–42, 42A and 43 Cliff Street; 54.48803°N 0.61477°W	—	Early 19th century	A row of houses of the same height in two or three storeys, in brick or stone, on a rendered plinth. They have doorways with fluted pilasters, semicircular radial fanlights and open pediments, and there is one passage door. The windows are sashes with wedge lintels, some also with keystones, and there are two dormers.	II
Railings, 40–43 Cliff Street; 54.48801°N 0.61584°W		Early 19th century	The railings are in iron, and extend along the pavement in front of the houses. They are plain with standards.	II
16 Flowergate; 54.48647°N 0.61589°W		Early 19th century	A shop on a curved corner site, it is roughcast, with a dentilled cornice and a slate roof. There are three storeys and five bays, one on the front, three on the right return, and one on the curved corner. Curving round the corner is an Art Deco shopfront in Vitrolite. On the right return is a doorway with fluted Ionic pilasters and a rectangular fanlight. The windows are double-hung sashes.	II
5 Haggersgate; 54.48780°N 0.61489°W	—	Early 19th century (probable)	A shop in painted brick, partly rendered, with three storeys and two bays. The ground floor contains a mid-to-late 19th-century shopfront, and the windows are double-hung sash windows with rendered flat arches.	II
12 Haggersgate; 54.48801°N 0.61483°W	—	Early 19th century	The house is in painted brick with a pantile roof. There are two storeys and an attic, and two bays. On the ground floor is a shopfront with a bow window and reeded pilasters, and a doorway to the left, and there is another doorway with a divided fanlight further to the left. The upper floor has a bow window on the right and above there are two sloped dormers.	II
14 Haggersgate; 54.48793°N 0.61477°W	—	Early 19th century	The house is in brick with a pantile roof. There are two storeys and an attic, and two bays. The ground floor contains a shop window and three doorways, two with fanlights, one blocked. On the upper floor are top-hung windows, and above is a dormer.	II
15 Haggersgate; 54.48787°N 0.61475°W	—	Early 19th century	The house is in brick on a plinth, with stone dressings, quoins, sill bands, and an eaves cornice. There are three storeys and two bays. The doorway on the right has a rectangular fanlight, the windows are sashes, and all the openings have flat stone arches.	II
17 Haggersgate; 54.48774°N 0.61472°W	—	Early 19th century	A brick house on a stone plinth, with floor bands, and a stone eaves cornice. There are three storeys and three bays. On the front are two doorways with pilasters, a semicircular fanlight and an open pediment, the right more elaborate. The windows are sashes with flat brick arches.	II
1 Old Market Place and 1 St Anne's Staith; 54.48683°N 0.61396°W	—	Early 19th century	A shop on a curved corner site in grey brick with a stone cornice and parapet. There are four storeys and five bays. The ground floor contains a continuous shopfront above which is a frieze and a cornice on consoles. The windows on the upper floors are sashes with wedge lintels.	II
1–4 Princess Place; 54.48454°N 0.61741°W	—	Early 19th century	A row of four houses in stone on a plinth, with rusticated quoins, and a slate roof with stone kneelers. There are two storeys and attics and four bays. On the front are four doorways, the middle two paired. The windows are double-hung sashes, and all the openings have flat stone arches. In the attic are sloped dormers, and at the rear are doorways with pedimented hoods on consoles.	II
1 Silver Street; 54.48668°N 0.61684°W	—	Early 19th century	A shop in painted red brick with a pantile roof. There are three storeys and three bays. The ground floor contains a shopfront with a fascia on decorative consoles. On the upper floors are sash windows with painted brick voussoirs.	II
9A Skinner Street; 54.48694°N 0.61724°W	—	Early 19th century	The shop is rendered, and has a sill band and a cornice. There are three storeys and two bays. The shopfront has panelled pilasters, and a fascia on consoles, on which are trophies and urns. The upper floors contain sash windows with moulded architraves.	II
3–5 Victoria Square and Georges View; 54.48497°N 0.61692°W	—	Early 19th century	A terrace of four brick houses with a Welsh slate roof. There are two storeys and eight bays. On the front are three round-headed doorways with moulded pilasters, and carved Greek key ornament; the right doorway also has panelled pilasters and a keystone. On the left is a shop window, and most of the other windows are double-hung sashes.	II
Two Customs Look Outs; 54.49078°N 0.61453°W		Early 19th century	A pair of small round buildings at the ends of Battery Parade. They are stuccoed, and each has a conical roof surmounted by baluster-shaped finials. Steps lead to a plain doorway, and the windows are circular.	II
Harbour Office; 54.48766°N 0.61464°W	—	Early 19th century	The building is in stone and is curved on a corner site. There are four storeys and five bays. The windows are in moulded architraves, and there are two loading doors. On the ground floor are two doorways, one a double carriage door, and the other a doorway with a rectangular fanlight.	II
Lindisfarne; 54.48741°N 0.61587°W	—	Early 19th century	A pair of brick houses with a stone band and a slate roof. There are two storeys and four bays. The doorways, paired in the centre, have a moulded stone architrave, pilasters and blocked semicircular fanlights. The windows are sashes in flush frames and with flat stone arches.	II
The Ship Public House; 54.48803°N 0.61482°W		Early 19th century	The public house is rendered, with repairs in brick and a pantile mansard roof. There are two storeys and attics, and two bays. The doorway on the right has a rectangular fanlight and the ground floor windows are modern. On the upper floor are sash windows, and there are two modern dormers.	II
The Sutcliffe Gallery; 54.48683°N 0.61440°W		Early 19th century	The shop is in red brick with a pantile roof. There are three storeys and two bays. On the ground floor is a modern shopfront with tiled stall risers. The windows above are double-hung sashes in flush frames, with flat stone arches and modern shutters.	II
Warden's House, The Missions to Seamen; 54.48751°N 0.61461°W	—	Early 19th century {probable)	The house is in painted brick with a pantile roof. There are two storeys and attics, and two bays. On the ground floor are two doorways in the centre, and two small modern windows to the right. The other windows are double-hung sashes, and all the openings have rendered flat arches. On the attic are two gabled dormers with carved bargeboards.	II
West Pier Lighthouse; 54.49277°N 0.61299°W		1834	The lighthouse consists of a fluted Doric column carrying an octagonal lantern with an octagonal lead dome with a weathervane. There are rails round the lantern.	II
Whitby railway station 54.48497°N 0.61538°W		1847	The railway station was designed by G. T. Andrews. It is in stone, with a modillion cornice, a parapet, and a hipped slate roof. There is one storey, and at the entrance is a projecting portico containing five round arches with moulded heads. This flanked by wings containing sash windows in architraves, some moulded, and some rusticated. On the right return is a two-bay loggia.	II
Engine shed 54.48293°N 0.61429°W		1847	The engine shed, which was extended in 1868, is in stone on a plinth, with quoins, and slate roofs with overhanging eaves and a continuous ventilator. The original part has eight bays and the extension has seven. The south front has two large round-headed engine openings, and to the left is a low, single-storey office wing with a hipped roof.	II
Royal Hotel; 54.48999°N 0.61668°W		1847–48	The large hotel was designed by G. T. Andrews, and is rendered with a Welsh slate roof. It consists of two long terraces at right angles, mainly with three storeys and attics, and hipped and mansard roofs. The windows are double-hung sashes, above the heavy cornices are dormers, and on the north front are two-storey canted bay windows. The main entrance is approached by steps, and has a glazed canopy above ironwork.	II
St John's Church; 54.48546°N 0.61681°W		1848–50	The church was designed by J. B. and W. Atkinson, and the chancel was altered in 1904–10. It is built in stone with slate roofs, and consists of a nave and a chancel under a continuous roof, with side aisles and transepts. Over the west transept is a small octagonal spire. The entrance front has two doorways in pointed moulded arches, with columns and flanking narrow arches. The corners have tall angle buttresses with gables and square pinnacles.	II
22 and 23 Flowergate; 54.48638°N 0.61668°W	—	Mid-19th century	The shop, which has an earlier origin, is rendered, and has a sill band and a Welsh slate roof. There are three storeys and three bays. The ground floor contains Edwardian and modern shopfronts. On the outer bays of the middle floor are canted bay windows, and between them is a sash window with a pediment. The top floor has segmental-arched windows in moulded architraves.	II
Kirbys Hotel and 5 and 6 East Parade; 54.48926°N 0.61660°W		Mid-19th century	The building is rendered, and has a heavy moulded cornice, and a mansard roof in Welsh slate. There are three storeys, basements and attics, and 17 bays. The doorways have rectangular fanlights and cornices on consoles. The windows are double-hung sashes, and above the ground floor is a continuous iron balcony with full-length standards and palmettes.	II
Area railings. Kirby's Hotel and 5 and 6 East Parade; 54.48920°N 0.61641°W	—	Mid-19th century	The railings enclosing the basement areas are in iron. They have full-length standards with fleur-de-lys heads.	II
Little Angel Public House; 54.48641°N 0.61618°W		19th century	The public house on a corner site, which has an earlier core, is rendered on a plinth, and has a pantile roof. The front has two storeys and two bays. On the ground floor are a modern door and window, and the upper floor has double-hung sash windows. On the left return is a modern single-storey extension.	II
Victoria Spa Well House; 54.48449°N 0.61961°W	—	1860	The building is in red brick, and has a single storey and a circular plan. The roof is steeply conical, and has bands of slate in alternating colours, and stone eaves. It is surmounted by an octagonal cupola with a conical lead roof and a pinnacle.	II
St Hilda's Church (Roman Catholic); 54.48541°N 0.61737°W		1865–67	The church, designed by M. E. Hadfield, is in stone and has slate roofs with ridge tiles. It consists of a continuous nave and chancel, narrow side aisles, and a south porch. The west front has a central doorway approached by steps in a gabled porch with a pointed arch with columns, above which is a niche with a statue. Over this is a row of five lancet windows and a round window with a quatrefoil. On the right is an octagonal tower with an octagonal spire.	II
St Hilda's Church; 54.48878°N 0.62072°W		1883–89	The church is in stone with tile roofs, and the tower was completed in 1938. It has a cruciform plan, consisting of a nave with a clerestory, north and south aisles, a west baptistry, a south porch, north and south transepts, a chancel with flanking vestries, and a broad tower at the crossing. The tower has three two-light bell openings on each side and an embattled parapet. At the west end is a large six-light window and octagonal corner turrets with short spires, and the east window has seven lights.	II*
10A Cliff Street; 54.48752°N 0.61590°W		1888	An architect's office, later used for other purposes, it is in red brick, with applied half-timber, pebbledashing and terracotta panelling, the Mansard roofs are in pantile and Welsh slate with terracotta ridge tiles and finials. There are two storeys and an attic, a front of three bays and a canted corner. The ground floor contains three large segmental-headed windows, each with a canted oriel window, under which are painted terracotta panels, and on the corner is a doorway with a segmental head and a fanlight. On the left bay of the upper floor is a taking-in door, to the right is a projecting balcony containing a canted oriel window, over the doorway is an oriel window with a carved figure below, and above it is a Dutch gable with a square plaque. On the front and the right return are gabled dormers with decorative bargeboards.	II
Brunswick Methodist Church and the Brunswick Room; 54.48577°N 0.61653°W		1891	The former church is in stone with a slate roof, and consists of a nave, a west porch, transepts and a northwest tower. On the west front, steps lead up to a porch with three round arches, the middle one with a central pair of columns and a gable. Above it is a large round arch with three round-headed windows, flanked by taller windows, above which is a gable. The tower is octagonal and has a projecting bow window. The bell openings are round-headed, and above them are two round-headed openings with a gable, and a squat spire. The interiors of the attached Brunswick and Pannet rooms have faience tile decoration.	II*
Former HSBC Bank; 54.48647°N 0.61377°W		1892	The former bank, which incorporates shops, was designed by Walter Brierley. It is in stone on the ground floor, in red brick with stone dressings above, and has a red tile roof. There are two storeys and attics, and three shaped gables, each over three bays. On the ground floor are two 20th-century shopfronts and the frontage of the bank, The windows on the upper floor are in groups of three in eared architraves, with sill bands and cornices, and there is one window in each gable. The left corner is recessed and contains a portico with a curved front, two columns and two pilasters, all with capitals carved with heads. Above is a curved balustrade and a cartouche.	II
Edwardian Shelter (east); 54.49065°N 0.62311°W		c. 1900	The shelter has six wooden columns with ornate cast iron brackets and rosette finials carrying a wooden ceiling, and a hipped shingle roof with an ornate cast iron crest. There are similar brackets elsewhere, inside are curved slatted benches, and there are simple benches at the ends.	II
Edwardian Shelter (west); 54.49066°N 0.62372°W		c. 1900	The shelter has six wooden columns with ornate cast iron brackets and rosette finials carrying a wooden ceiling, and a hipped shingle roof with an ornate cast iron crest. There are similar brackets elsewhere, inside are curved slatted benches, and there are simple benches at the ends.	II
Statue of Captain Cook; 54.49046°N 0.61633°W		1912	The statue on East Parade consists of a bronze statue of Captain Cook by John Tweed on a stone pedestal, with inscriptions by Eric Gill. On the rear is a relief carving of his ship, Resolution.	II
Art Nouveau Shelter; 54.49064°N 0.62410°W		c. 1914	The shelter is in wood, and has 17 square posts with curved braces carrying a tile hipped roof with deeply overhanging eaves. Inside are bench seats on curved brackets. The shelter is decorated with Art Nouveau motifs.	II
Telephone kiosk, Baxtergate; 54.48591°N 0.61509°W		1935	The telephone kiosk in Baxtergate is of the K6 type designed by Giles Gilbert Scott. Constructed in cast iron with a square plan and a dome, it has three unperforated crowns in the top panels.	II
