= Flowergate Old Chapel =

Chapel in Whitby, North Yorkshire, England

Coordinates: 54°29′12″N 0°36′52″W

Flowergate Old Chapel is a Unitarian church in Whitby, a town in North Yorkshire, in England.

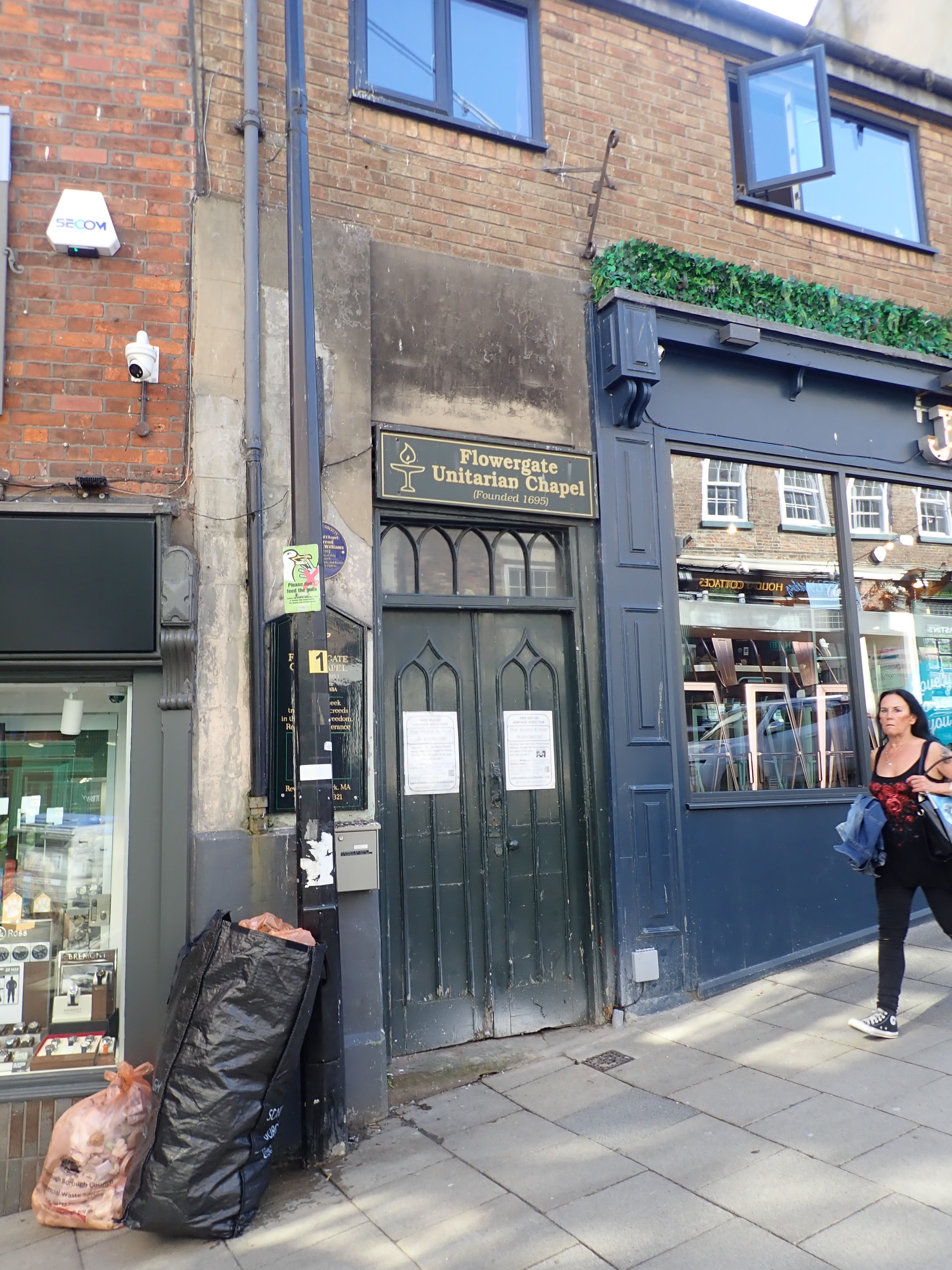

A Presbyterian group began worshipping in Whitby in 1695, in a house on Bridge Street. In 1715, it moved to a site off Flowergate, and the congregation became Unitarian. The chapel was rebuilt in 1812, although a Mediaeval cellar survives. From 1888 to 1910, the chapel's minister was the social justice activist Francis Haydn Williams. The building was grade II listed in 1954. In 2019, the congregation raised almost £4,000 for urgent repairs. Regular services ceased at the end of 2025, but the congregation stated that it would continue to celebrate solstices and equinoxes there.

The chapel is built of red brick. The doorway has a round head and a glazed fanlight, there are two round-arched windows, and a smaller one above the doorway. Inside, there is a balcony, and extensive woodwork including the pulpit.

== See also ==
- Listed buildings in Whitby (central area - west)
