= The Princess Who Was Hidden Underground =

German fairy tale

The Princess Who Was Hidden Underground is a German fairy tale. Andrew Lang included it in The Violet Fairy Book.

== Synopsis ==
In a far away kingdom there was a king divided his property between his three sons. The older two squandered what they had been given and soon had nothing, but the youngest son was prudent, and became rich.

The youngest son, now the king, had an underground castle built, in which he imprisoned his daughter, and then killed the architect. The youngest son decreed that whoever could find his daughter would marry her, but whoever tried and failed would die. Many died trying. One of the young men looking for the king's daughter had a shepherd sew him into a golden sheep fleece and bring him to the king. The king tried to buy the sheep, the shepherd would only lend it for three days. The king borrowed the sheep and took it to his daughter in the underground castle, using a magical charm to open the doors.

In the night, the man threw off the sheepskin, and upon seeing him the daughter fell in love with him. Before their three days together were up the princess told the young man that even if he could find her, the king would insist on another test; the king would turn the princess and her maid into ducks and the young man would have to determine which duck was the princess.

When the three days were up, the shepherd returned to the king to retrieve his sheep and the young man revealed himself. The young man found the daughter using what he had learned, the young man successfully identified the princess after the king turned her and all her maids to ducks. Because the young man was successful the king had to yield and the young man married the princess.

== Motifs ==
This method of winning the princess is also found in the Italian fairy tales The Fair Fiorita and The Golden Lion.
