= Ronald Sims =

British architect

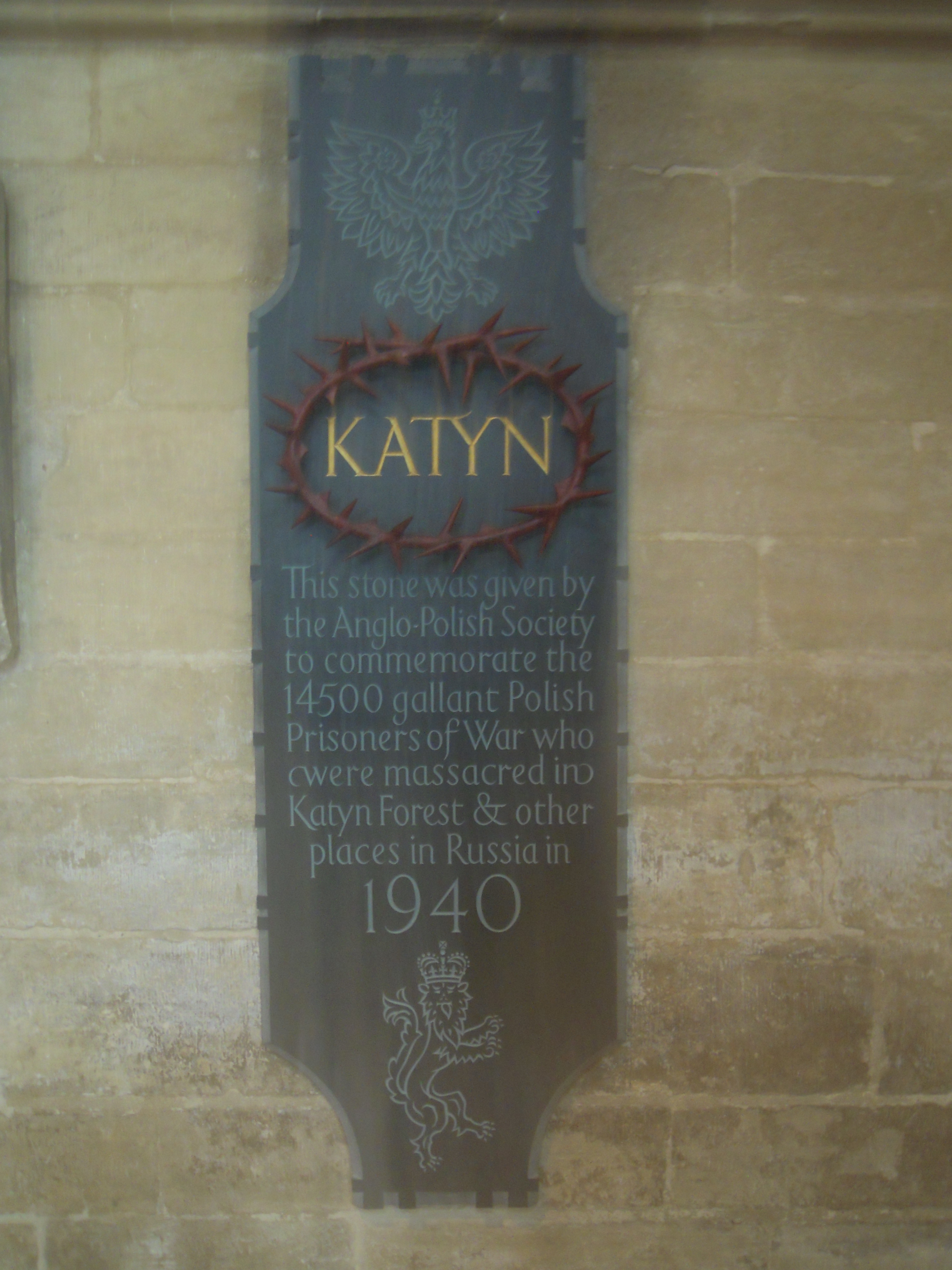
The Katyn Memorial in Southwell Minster; designed by Ronald Sims

Ronald George Sims (November 1926–November 2007) was a distinguished ecclesiastical architect who redesigned many English church interiors. His style combined modernism with a respect for tradition and particularly the Arts and Crafts movement. He graduated in 1952, when he joined the practice of George Pace, the ecclesiastical architect based in York. In 1975 he inherited the practice after Pace died.

He designed the Chapter House at Southwark Cathedral and the interior of St Mary's in Putney which had been completely gutted by fire. He similarly transformed Heslington Church near the University of York.

His work was recognised in 1999 when the Archbishop of Canterbury (then George Carey) awarded him a Lambeth Degree for his contribution to Church building.

== Ecclesiastical buildings restored by Sims ==
- St. Mary's Church, Clifton (between 1969 and 1979)
- St. Mary's, South Hylton (1970)
- St John's Goole (1980)
- St. Mary's Church, Putney (1983)
- St Peter's - Hoyland (1991)
- St Elphin's Church, Warrington (1999)
- Southwark Cathedral (Chapter house, 1989)
