= Royal Hotel, Whitby =

Hotel in North Yorkshire, England

Royal Hotel
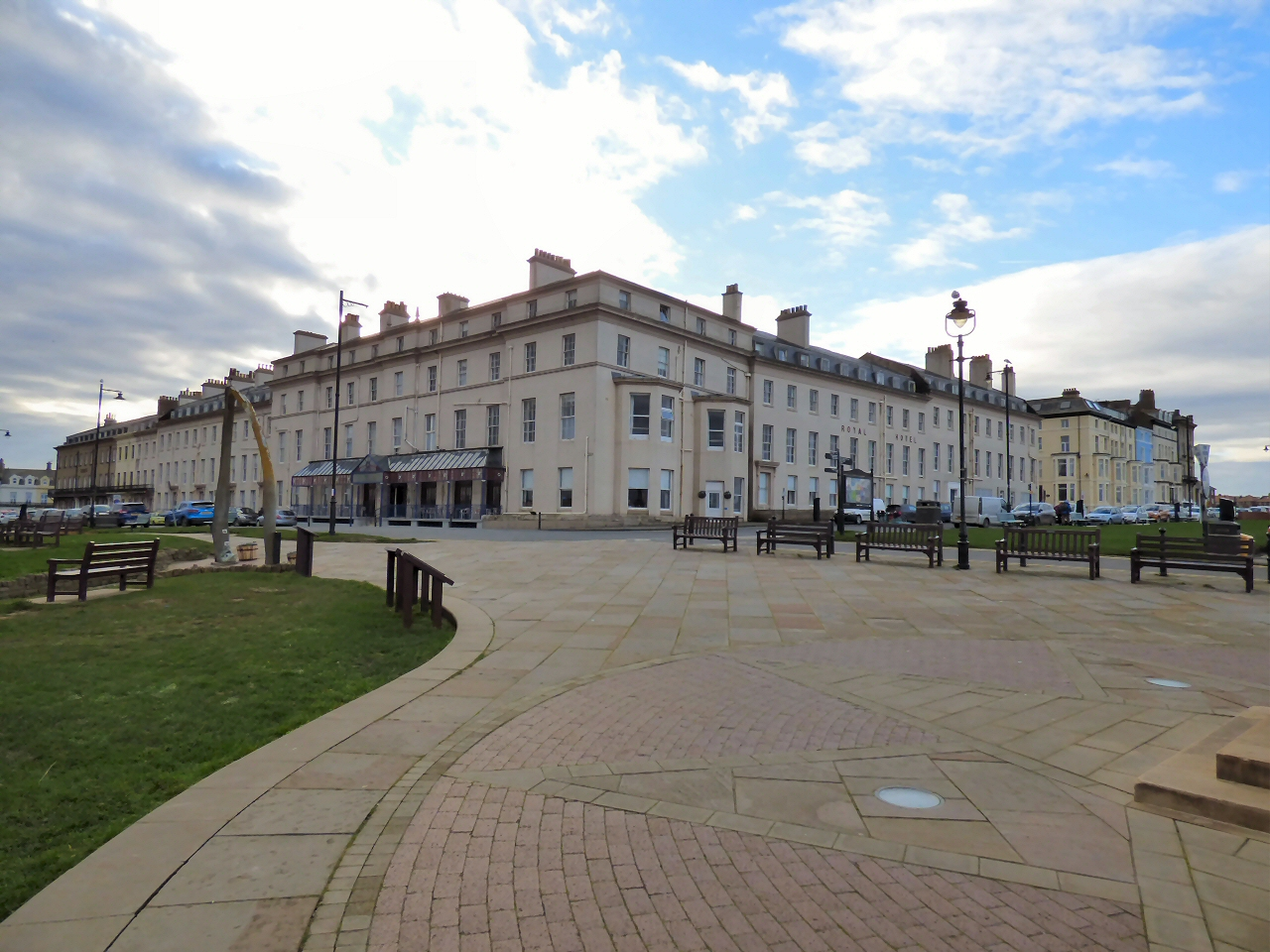
- The hotel in 2018

- Location within North Yorkshire

General information
- Location: East Terrace, Whitby, North Yorkshire, England
- Coordinates: 54°29′23″N 0°37′00″W
- Year built: 1847–48
- Client: George Hudson

Design and construction
- Architect: George Townsend Andrews

Website
- royalwhitby.co.uk

Listed Building – Grade II
- Official name: Royal Hotel
- Designated: 4 November 1965
- Reference no.: 1148266

The Royal Hotel is a historic building on East Terrace (Note: The building's official listing gives its address as East Parade, but its address is on East Terrace.) in Whitby, a town in North Yorkshire, England.

The hotel was commissioned by George Hudson and was built between 1847 and 1848, to a design by George Townsend Andrews. The building was Grade II listed in 1965. It was operated by Coast & Country Hotels in the early 21st century, then in 2024 was sold, at which time it had 115 bedrooms.

The hotel is rendered with a Welsh slate roof. It consists of two long terraces at right angles, mainly with three storeys and attics, and hipped and mansard roofs. The East Terrace facade has 11 bays. The windows are double-hung sashes, above the heavy cornices are dormers, and on the north front are two-storey canted bay windows. The main entrance is approached by steps, and has a glazed canopy above ironwork.

== See also ==
- Listed buildings in Whitby (central area - west)
