= The Golden Lion (fairy tale) =

Italian fairy tale

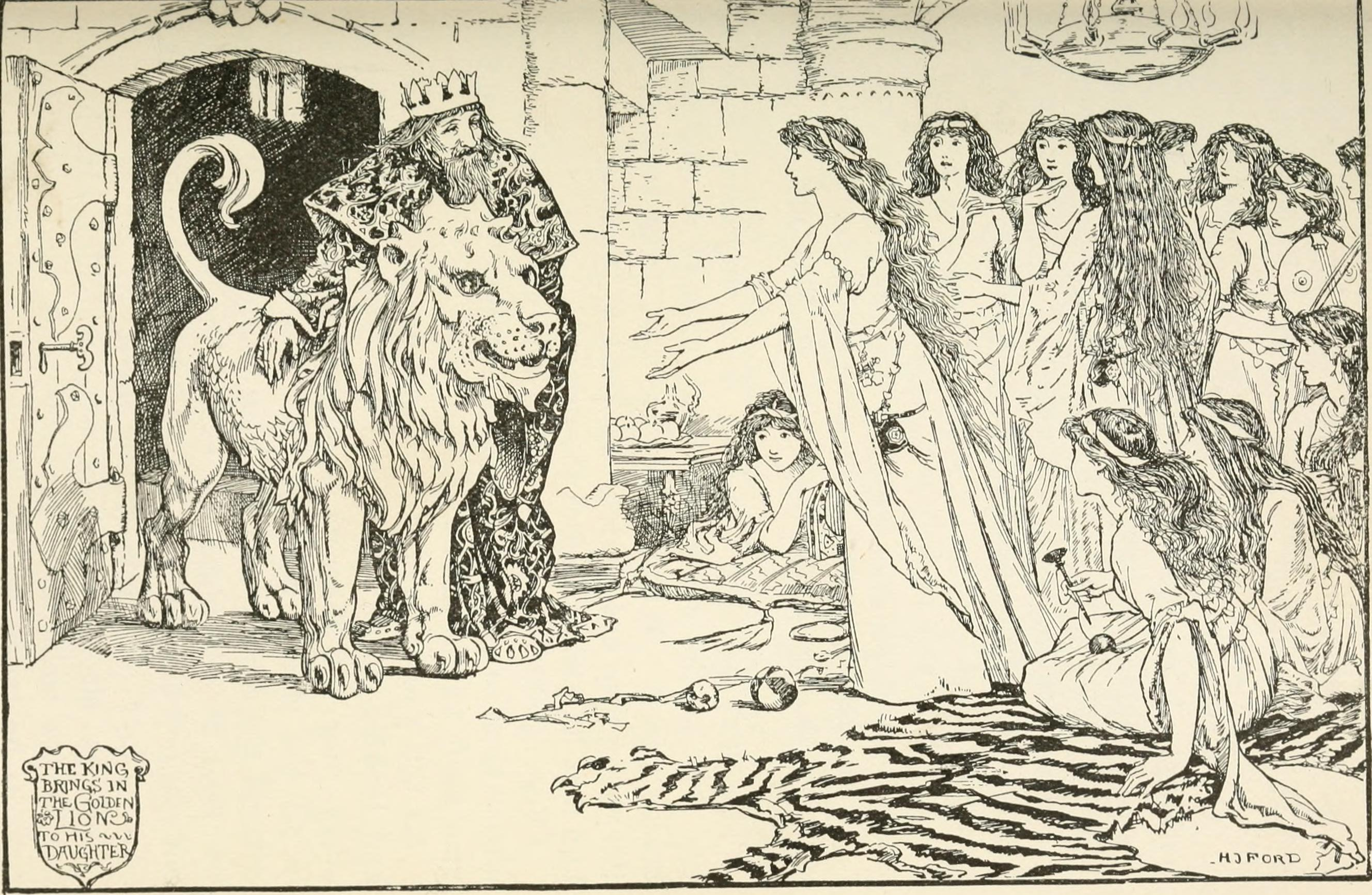
The king brings in the golden lion to his daughter, illustration by Henry Justice Ford

The Golden Lion (German: Vom goldnen Löwen) is an Italian fairy tale collected by Laura Gonzenbach in Sicilianische Märchen. Andrew Lang included it in The Pink Fairy Book.

== Synopsis ==
A merchant had three sons. The oldest set out and found a city where the king had proclaimed that whoever found his daughter within eight days would marry her, but anyone who tried and failed would lose his head. The son tried and failed. His second brother followed and also failed.

The youngest son, following his brothers, discovered their fates and rebuffed an old woman who sought alms from him. She asked if he was in trouble, and the son explained the situation. She told him that he should purchase a statue of a golden lion that played music, so that he could hide inside it. After the statue was completed, the man hid inside. The old woman showed the lion to the king. When he wanted it, she told him she could only lend it to him overnight. He brought it down a secret stairway to twelve identical women. During the night, the youth implored the princess to help him, and she told him she would wear a white sash when he came hunting for her so he could identify her.

The old woman took the lion away. The youth came out of hiding and went to the king, who gave him permission to search for the princess. The young man went to the place where the princess was hidden and chose the woman who was wearing the white sash.

The king agreed to their wedding. The merchant's son and the princess then sailed off with her dowry. They also gave the old woman enough money for the rest of her days.

== Analysis ==
This method of winning the princess is also found in the fairy tales The Fair Fiorita and The Princess Who Was Hidden Underground.

=== Classification ===
Soon after he developed his classification of folktales, Finnish folklorist Antti Aarne published, in 1912, a study on the collections of the Brothers Grimm, Austrian consul Johann Georg von Hahn, Danish folklorist Svend Grundtvig, Swiss scholar Laura Gonzenbach and Alexander Afanasyev. According to this primary system, developed in 1910, the tale fits type 854, "The Golden Buck (Goat, Ram)": the prince enters a princess's room hidden in a statue of an animal made of gold and wins the hand of the princess. This typing was corroborated by professors Jack Zipes and Stith Thompson, who also classified the tale as AaTh 854, "The Golden Ram".

According to Reinhold Köhler's annotations on the tale, in a Greek variant, the hero dresses in the golden fleece of a lamb to enter the princess's quarters, and in another tale he can change into an eagle to reach her room. In an Irish variant, the prince enters the princess's room inside a golden deer.

According to Jack Zipes, the tale type is found in Europe, Turkey and South America, and has a literary tradition.
