= Golden Lion, Whitby =

Pub in North Yorkshire, England

Golden Lion
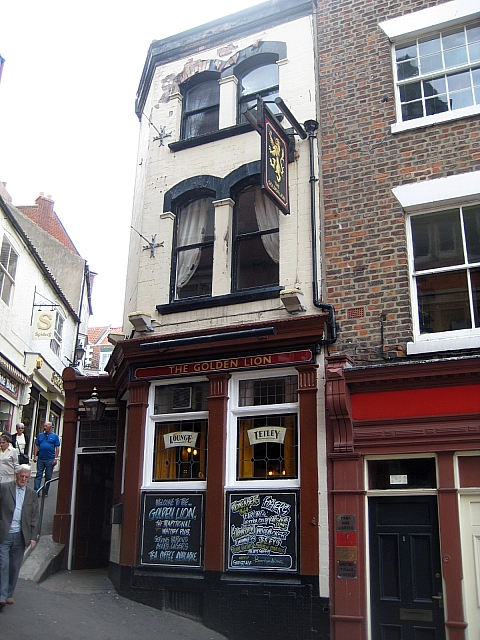
- The pub in 2010

- Location within North Yorkshire

General information
- Location: Golden Lion Bank, Whitby, North Yorkshire, England
- Coordinates: 54°29′12″N 0°36′50″W
- Year built: 18th century
- Renovated: Late 19th century (partly rebuilt); 20th century (altered)
- Owner: J & S Pub Company

Website
- Official website

Listed Building – Grade II
- Official name: Golden Lion public house
- Designated: 4 December 1972
- Reference no.: 1148244

The Golden Lion is a historic pub on Golden Lion Bank in Whitby, a town in North Yorkshire, England.

An inn was first recorded on the site in 1714, and the rear elevation of the pub survives from the 18th century. The front was rebuilt in the late 19th century, and its ground floor was altered in the 20th century. The pub was Grade II listed in 1972. In 2019, it was owned by Star Pubs, which proposed changing its name to the "Salty Dog", but this was not carried forward. In 2025, the exterior of the pub was redecorated and its signs were replaced.

The pub is rendered and has three storeys and two bays. The ground floor has a pub front with Doric pilasters, and a fascia with the name, and above are paired sash windows under segmental arches. The rear is in brick with a small modillion cornice and two storeys. It contains a five-light sash window and a round-arched stair window.

== See also ==
- Listed buildings in Whitby (central area - west)
