= J. B. and W. Atkinson =

English architects

J. B. and W. Atkinson were English brothers who worked together as architects.

John Bownas Atkinson (1807 – 1874) and William Atkinson (1811 – 1886) were the sons of the architect Peter Atkinson. They were born in York, and J. B. went into partnership with his father in 1831. This was dissolved in 1833, but in 1837 J. B. instead formed a partnership with his younger brother. By around 1870, their office was based at 10 Lendal. They designed a large number of buildings, chiefly in Yorkshire. Nikolaus Pevsner later described them as "producing many accomplished Classical buildings and a few less-assured Gothic churches". J. B. died in 1874, and in 1877, W. went into partnership with James Demaine.

J. B. Atkinson was also the first person to serve as City Surveyor of York, from 1850 to 1854.

== Works ==
The partners' works include:

- All Saints' Church, Appleton Roebuck
- All Saints' Church, Burythorpe
- Church of the Immaculate Conception, Scarthingwell
- Easingwold Union Workhouse
- Elmbank Hotel, York
- Heslington Church
- Holy Trinity Church, Tunstall
- St Bartholomew's Church, West Witton
- St Clement's Church, York
- St Helen's Church, Kilnwick Percy
- St John's Church, Whitby
- St John the Baptist's Church, Acklam
- St Luke's Church, Clifford, West Yorkshire
- St Paul's Church, Holgate
- York County Hospital
