= St Bartholomew's Church, Ruswarp =

Church in Ruswarp, North Yorkshire, England

Coordinates: 54.4704°N 0.6297°W

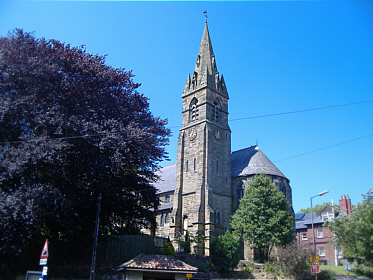
The building in 2006, while in use as a church

St Bartholomew's Church is a redundant Anglican church in Ruswarp, a village in North Yorkshire, in England.

Ruswarp was long in the parish of St Mary's Church, Whitby, and in the mid-19th century, serviced in the village were held at Ruswarp Hall. A purpose-built church was designed by Charles Noel Armfield, and is the first building he designed alone. It is in the late 13th-century Gothic style, built at a cost of £3,052, and it was consecrated in 1869. Most of the internal fittings were replaced in the early 20th century by ones designed by Robert Thompson. A narthex was added in 1990, containing a parish room, kitchen and toilet.

By 2016, congregations at the church had fallen to fewer than ten worshippers, and services were being held monthly. The church closed in 2020, and was grade II listed the following year, after a campaign by the Victorian Society. In 2022, it was converted into two flats, with the internal fittings being moved elsewhere, but the stained glass windows retained.

The church is built of Grosmont sandstone, and has a Welsh slate roof with terracotta ridge tiles. It consists of a nave, a south porch, a south Lady chapel, a chancel with an apse, and a southeast steeple. The steeple has a tower with five stages, angle buttresses, a semicircular stair turret, external steps with a wrought iron balustrade leading to the vestry, lancet windows, clock faces, a dentilled string course, and paired louvred bell openings. The tower is surmounted by an octagonal broach spire with pyramidal pinnacles on the corners, two tiers of gabled lucarnes, a band of triangular openings, and a weathercock.

== See also ==
- Listed buildings in Whitby (outer areas)
