= Whitby Cemetery =

Cemetery in North Yorkshire, England

- The chapels at Whitby Cemetery
- Interactive map of Whitby Cemetery

Details
- Established: 1862
- Location: Whitby, North Yorkshire
- Country: England
- Coordinates: 54.475°N 0.610°W
- Type: Public
- Owned by: North Yorkshire Council
- Find a Grave: Whitby Cemetery

Whitby Cemetery (or Larpool Cemetery) is a burial ground in the town of Whitby, North Yorkshire, England. Previous to the burial ground being open, interments took place in the graveyard around St Mary's Church on the east cliff of the town, by the coastline. The Larpool burial ground was opened in the 1860s, and a report from the early 2020s estimated the ground would run out of space between 2025 and 2027. Efforts to find an extension, or an alternative space, have proved problematic.

== History ==
Up until 1861, burials were undertaken in the graveyard of St Mary's Church on the clifftop of the east cliff in Whitby town, next to the abbey. The new 7-acre (2.8 ha) cemetery and chapels at Larpool were opened to the public on 1 November 1862, with the graveyard there being divided into two sections; one for adherents to the Church of England, and the other for "non-conformists". In late 1863, the then Archbishop of York refused to consecrate the cemetery due to irregularities regarding burials which had already taken place at Larpool, but which had been carried out by persons "..not in holy orders.." (Note: The Nonconformist Journal states that this was when "..the incumbent of the parish refused to bury a deceased parishioner, and the service, after the mourners had waited in vain for their own spiritual guide, counsellor, and comforter, was performed by a Primitive Methodist minister. It now appears that in the public cemetery in which this occurred was only temporarily licensed by the archbishop; who refuses, in consequence of this act, to consecrate it.") The Home Office approved the enlargement of the cemetery in 1876. The older cemetery, surrounding the Church of St Mary, remained open for interments until 1865, but this was mostly in family vaults or graves, rather than new plots to be buried in.

The chapels and gatehouse lodge of the cemetery (all on the western side of the burial ground) are Grade II listed structures to a design by Pritchett & Son of Darlington. The chapels are connected by an archway which has a steeple, and also through which the main thoroughfare runs; the entire structure cost £1,657 in 1862. The steeple rises to a height of 80 feet (24 m). The cemetery has two main entrances and exits; one on the Whitby to Scarborough road, the other on the road between Whitby and Sneaton.

In 1917 a monument was erected in the cemetery to commemorate the 91 victims of the SS Rohilla sinking. The ship had sunk just off the coast of Whitby in October 1914, but rough seas prevented lifeboats from rescuing all the occupants. Thirty-three of the victims were buried in Whitby Cemetery after the disaster. The cemetery has 71 identified casualties buried in Commonwealth War Graves, with the most being sailors due to Whitby's maritime location, and bodies washing ashore; there are also 19 unidentified men from World War I and one unidentified Merchant Navy seaman of World War II. Also buried here are victims of the German shelling of Whitby in December 1914 and six Belgian Merchant Navy seamen from a shipwreck in February 1940.

A report in 2015 stated that the burials at the site were "..up to the railings.." indicating the lack of available space. The cemetery is expected to run out of space between 2025 and 2027, and efforts to create an extension have been objected to by local residents as the preferred site for expansion is an area of playing fields. Another site which has been earmarked for a cemetery is a parcel of land near to Whitby Golf Club, which is to the west of Whitby.

== Notable interments ==
- Thomas Chambers (1808–1869), painter
- Mary Linskill (1840–1891), novelist

== See also ==
- Listed buildings in Whitby (outer areas)
