= Listed buildings in Whitby (outer areas) =

Whitby is a civil parish in the county of North Yorkshire, England. It contains over 470 listed buildings that are recorded in the National Heritage List for England. Of these, nine are listed at Grade I, the highest of the three grades, 25 at Grade II*, the middle grade, and the others are at Grade II, the lowest grade. The parish contains the town of Whitby and the surrounding area, including the village of Ruswarp and the smaller settlement of Ewe Cote.

Whitby has long connections with Christianity since the Synod of Whitby in 664, and the listed buildings most strongly representing this are Whitby Abbey and St Mary's Church, both listed at Grade I. These are both on the east side of the River Esk, where the town first mainly developed largely due to is harbour, the fishing industry and ship building. Most of the listed buildings in this area of the town are houses and cottages, and shops and cafés serving the current tourist industry, many of them crowded closely together due to the limited space available. The town developed on the west side of the town following the arrival of the railway in the 1840s, leading to the growth of the tourist industry here. In addition to hotels, restaurants and shops, many fine houses were built, together with churches and chapels, banks and public buildings.

This list contains the listed buildings outside the central part of the town, mainly to the west and south. Those in the other areas can be found at:

- Listed buildings in Whitby (central area - east)
- Listed buildings in Whitby (central area - west)

== Key ==
Grade	Criteria
I	Buildings of exceptional interest, sometimes considered to be internationally important
II*	Particularly important buildings of more than special interest
II	Buildings of national importance and special interest

== Buildings ==
Name and location	Photograph	Date	Notes	Grade
Cross Butts; 54.47911°N 0.64977°W	—	17th century	The house is in stone, and has a Welsh slate roof with stone capped gables. There are two storeys and four bays. On the front is a projecting capped gabled stone porch with a slightly stilted chamfered stone archway. The windows are double-hung sashes.	II
Farm buildings, Cross Butts; 54.47928°N 0.64956°W	—	17th century	The farm buildings are in stone, and have pantile roofs and a single storey. They contain doorways with chamfered surrounds, and the gables facing the road are capped.	II
Ruswarp Hall; 54.47157°N 0.62939°W		Late 17th century	The house is in brick with stone dressings, quoins, and a slate roof with capped gables. There are two storeys and attics, and seven bays. The central doorway has a moulded surround, a double curved frieze, and a broken segmental pediment enclosing a square block with lozenge ornament and a ball finial. The windows are mullioned and transomed, with alternate broken triangular and segmental pediments. All the openings have quoined surrounds, and above are three gabled dormers with finials.	II*
Wall and gate piers, Ruswarp Hall; 54.47150°N 0.62963°W		Late 17th century	The front garden walls are in stone with stone gable topping. The gate piers are also in stone, and have a square section and are surmounted by ball finials.	II*
Ewe Cote Hall; 54.48490°N 0.64550°W	—	1697	The house is in stone with a pantile roof. There are two storeys and attics, and five bays. The doorway is in the centre, and above it are initials and the date. The windows are mullioned and transomed. On the attic are two dormers with mullioned windows and segmental pediments. Inside there are contemporary features.	II*
The Old Hall or Boghall; 54.48047°N 0.61612°W	—	1719	The house is in stone, and has a pantile roof with stone capped gables and kneelers. There are two storeys and five bays. The door is modern and has a flat hood on consoles, and the windows are double-hung sashes.	II
16 and 18 High Street; 54.47111°N 0.62938°W	—	Early 18th century	A pair of cottages in rendered stone with a pantile roof, stone copings and kneelers. There are two storeys and two bays. The doorways are on the left, the windows are mullioned, and on the right cottage is a dormer.	II
Gazebo at High Stakesby Manor House; 54.48363°N 0.63412°W	—	Early 18th century	The gazebo has a ground floor in stone, the upper floor in brick, and a pyramidal pantile roof with a finial. There are plain quoins, and it contains round-headed sash windows with rubbed brick arches, stone archivolts and keystones. External stone steps lead to an upper room.	II
Gazebo north of High Stakesby Manor House; 54.48417°N 0.63433°W	—	Early 18th century	The gazebo has a ground floor in stone, the upper floor in brick, and a pyramidal pantile roof with a finial. There are plain quoins, and it contains sash windows and a wide entrance with segmental head.	II
Lodge Farmhouse; 54.47528°N 0.60257°W	—	Early 18th century	The farmhouse is in stone, with an eaves cornice and a hipped slate roof. There are two storeys and attics, and a square plan. The doorway has a sloped hood on brackets. On the front is a sash window and a mullioned window. To the left is a two-storey wing with a pantile roof, containing a modern window and a sash window.	II
Ruswarp Post Office; 54.47123°N 0.62942°W		Early 18th century	The building is on a corner site, it is roughcast with a hipped pantile roof, and there is one storey and attics. The doorway is angled on the corner. On the front is a rectangular shop bay window, and there are two-light windows and a half-dormer on the left return.	II
Upper Bauldbyes; 54.48033°N 0.62339°W	—	Early 18th century	The house is in brick with stone dressings, it is rendered and painted, and has slate roofs with coped gables. There are two storeys and attics, and a garden front of five bays. In the centre is a doorway with Doric columns, an entablature and a pediment, and sash windows. The entrance front has a projecting porch with pilasters, above which is a Venetian window. On this front, and elsewhere, are casement windows. To the west is a square outbuilding with a hipped roof.	II
Garden walls, Ewe Cote Hall; 54.48469°N 0.64542°W	—	1737	The house and garden are enclosed by a stone wall. This contains two entrances with round arches, a pediment and a ball finial.	II*
11 and 13 High Street; 54.47144°N 0.62989°W		18th century	A pair of houses in painted brick, with a floor band, and a Welsh slate roof with stone capped gables. There are two storeys and two bays. The doorways are paired in the centre in a segmental-arched reveal. Above the doorways are three round-arched blank panels, the windows are casements, and there are two sloped dormers.	II
15 and 17 High Street; 54.47139°N 0.62982°W	—	18th century	A pair of cottages in brick with a pantile roof. There one storey and attics, and two bays. In the centre are paired doorways, to the right is a double-hung sash window, and to the left is a three-light horizontally sliding sash window. The attic has two sloped dormers.	II
19 High Street; 54.47129°N 0.62970°W		18th century	The house, which was refashioned in the 19th century, is rendered, the ground floor is channelled, and there are sill bands, a cornice and a parapet. The house has three storeys and a cellar, and four bays. The doorway is approached by double flights of steps with iron railings, and has a cornice on consoles. The windows are sashes with stucco surrounds. The rear is in brick and has irregular fenestration.	II
21 and 23 High Street; 54.47120°N 0.62968°W		18th century	A pair of houses in stone, the front curved, with a floor band and a Welsh slate roof. There are two storeys and three bays. On the front are two doorways and windows of mixed styles.	II
22 High Street; 54.47099°N 0.62938°W	—	18th century	The house is in stone, and has a pantile roof with stone kneelers. There are two storeys and one bay. The doorway on the right has a rectangular fanlight, and the windows are sashes.	II
24 and 26 High Street; 54.47096°N 0.62937°W	—	18th century	The houses are in stone with a pantile roof. There are two storeys and three bays. In the centre is a doorway, to the right is a passage door, and both have rectangular fanlights. The windows are sashes.	II
25–33 High Street; 54.47100°N 0.62960°W	—	18th century (probable)	A row of five cottages in stone, the right two lower, with pantile roofs, and some with capped gables and kneelers. There are two storeys and seven bays. Two cottages have a stone eaves cornice, and each cottage has a plain doorway. The windows are a mix; some are horizontally sliding sashes, and others are modern replacements.	II
34 High Street; 54.47059°N 0.62917°W	—	18th century	The house is in stone, and has a pantile roof with stone capped gables and kneelers. There are two storeys and three bays. The central doorway has an architrave, a decorative fanlight, a pulvinated frieze and a cornice. The windows are sashes, those on the outer bays paired, and all have keystones.	II
47 and 49 Mayfield Road; 54.47984°N 0.62813°W	—	18th century	A pair of rendered stone houses with a pantile roof. There are two storeys and four bays. On the front are two doorways, the right doorway with a rectangular fanlight, and between them is a garage door. The windows have modern glazing.	II
51–59 Mayfield Road; 54.47980°N 0.62842°W	—	18th century	A row of houses in rendered stone, with a pantile roof and two storeys. Two of the doorways have rectangular fanlights. The windows vary, and include double-hung sashes, small square windows, a quatrefoil, a round-headed stair window, a canted oriel window, and modern windows. At the right end is a projecting stone porch with an embattled parapet.	II
1–3 The Carrs; 54.46975°N 0.63045°W		18th century	A row of three cottages in brick with a pantile roof. There is a single storey with attics. Each cottage has a doorway to the left, a window to the right, and a sloped dormer in the attic.	II
Carr Cottage; 54.46977°N 0.62990°W	—	18th century	The cottage is in painted brick and has a pantile roof. There are two storeys and two bays. The doorway is in the centre, and the windows are double-hung sashes, those on the upper floor under segmental arches.	II
Carr Hall; 54.46567°N 0.65061°W		18th century	A country house, later a school, in stone on a plinth, with a hipped Welsh slate roof. There are two storeys and five bays. In the centre is a projecting porch, and the doorway has a rectangular fanlight. The windows are sashes with moulded keystones.	II
Castle View; 54.48402°N 0.63566°W	—	18th century	The house is in stone and has a slate roof with stone kneelers. There are two storeys and three bays. The doorway is modern, and has a sloped hood. The windows are modern and mullioned, with three lights; one is blocked and has a keystone.	II
Esk View; 54.46980°N 0.62979°W		18th century	The house is in stone, and has a pantile roof with stone kneelers. There are three storeys and three bays. The doorway on the left has a trellis porch and a rectangular fanlight. On the ground floor are modern windows, the middle floor contains double-hung sash windows, and on the top floor are horizontally sliding sash windows, the middle one blind.	II
Ewe Cote Cottage; 54.48507°N 0.64619°W	—	18th century	The cottage is in stone and has a pantile roof with stone kneelers. There are two storeys and three bays. The doorway has a trellised porch. On the ground floor are two modern windows and a small sash window to the right, and the upper floor contains casement windows.	II
Garden wall, Ewe Cote Cottage; 54.48499°N 0.64621°W	—	18th century	The garden wall is in stone, and incorporates a horse trough in a recess.	II
Ewe Cote Hall Farmhouse; 54.484807°N 0.64592°W	—	18th century	There are two storeys and attics, a pantile roof, and two gables at the rear. On the ground floor are four modern windows, the gable has two small windows on the upper storey and three below, and there are four semi-dormers on the front.	II
Dovecote and outbuilding, Ewe Cote Hall; 54.48502°N 0.64575°W	—	18th century (probable)	The dovecote and outbuilding are in stone and have a pantile roof with stone kneelers. It contains an arched entrance, a window in the gable end, and three vent holes.	II
Larpool Mill; 54.47034°N 0.62013°W		18th century	A stone cottage with a pantile roof, and two storeys. Projecting from the front is a single-storey pentice with a modern door and window. The main part has a small double-hung sash window, and a modern window below. At the rear are three small windows.	II
Low Stakesby Mansion; 54.48414°N 0.62733°W	—	18th century	The house is in plum-coloured brick, with stone dressings, quoins, a cornice, a brick parapet and a pediment containing a coat of arms. There are two storeys, five bays, a central Venetian window and two pedimented dormers. On the right, at right angles, is a two-storey wing with seven bays, the middle three bays projecting under a pediment containing an oeil-de-boeuf. It has a pantile roof, a parapet and a central Diocletian window, and the other windows are sashes. At the rear are eight bays, with a balustrade, and an Ionic doorway with a pediment, and a doorway with a round fanlight.	II*
Manor Cottage; 54.48399°N 0.63531°W	—	18th century	The house is in stone, and has a pantile roof with stone kneelers. There are two storeys and three bays. The doorway has a plain surround, and the windows are modern with keystones.	II
Mulgrove Cottage; 54.46975°N 0.62998°W	—	18th century	The cottage is in brick with a pantile roof. There are two storeys, one bay, and a projecting outshut on the front. The doorways and windows are modern; the windows are casements.	II
The Cottages; 54.48478°N 0.64631°W	—	18th century (probable)	A row of three stone cottages with a pantile roof and stone kneelers. There is one storey and attics, and three bays. The doors are plain, the windows are double-hung sashes, and each cottage has one dormer.	II
The Croft; 54.48432°N 0.63589°W	—	18th century	The house, at right angles to the road, is in stone and has a pantile roof with stone kneelers. There are two storeys, three bays, and a later single-storey extension on the right. The door is modern, some windows are modern, and others are double-hung sashes in moulded frames.	II
Former Unicorn Public House; 54.47086°N 0.62936°W	—	18th century	The former public house is in stone with rusticated quoins, and a floor and a sill band. There are two storeys and two bays. The doorway is in the centre, and the windows are sashes, those on the upper floor with moulded shouldered architraves.	II
Ruswarp Mill; 54.46940°N 0.63022°W		1752	The mill is in red brick, with floor bands, a dentilled eaves cornice, and a half-hipped slate roof. There are three storeys, fronts of six and three bays and lean-tos. The windows are sashes with stone heads and keystones. On the front is an inscribed and dated plaque in a shaped frame.	II
Carr Mount; 54.46665°N 0.64438°W		Late 18th century	The house is in stone, with a cornice, a parapet and a hipped tile roof. There are two storeys and seven bays, the middle three bays projecting and canted, containing a doorway with a divided fanlight. The windows are double-hung sashes.	II
Stables, Ewe Cote Hall; 54.48508°N 0.64598°W	—	Late 18th century (probable)	The stables are in stone and have a pantile roof with stone kneelers. There is one storey.	II
Larpool Hall; 54.47150°N 0.61433°W		Late 18th century	A country house in stone, with quoins, floor and sill bands, a parapet and a hipped roof. The main block has three storeys and five bays, the middle bay projecting slightly under a pediment, and it is flanked by slightly recessed two-storey wings with two bays. In the centre is an arched porch, and a doorway with Gothic clustered half-columns, a shaped and enriched frieze and a pediment. The windows are sashes, and on the left wing are later bay windows.	II
Gate piers, Larpool Hall; 54.47384°N 0.61306°W		Late 18th century (probable)	The gate piers flanking the entrance to the drive are in stone and have pyramidal caps.	II
St Columban's; 54.47987°N 0.61967°W		1790	The house is in stone with quoins, and consists of a main block with two storeys and five bays, linked by curved walls to single-storey pavilions. The main block has a pediment over the middle three bays containing an oval window, flanked by open balustrades and vases in niches. The block has Tuscan attached columns between bays on the ground floor, and pilasters above. In the centre is a projecting porch with Doric columns and an entablature. The door has curved reveals and an openwork parapet. Above the porch is a Venetian window with Ionic columns and a rusticated surround. The windows have architraves, those in the ground floor with rusticated surrounds and triple keystones. The pavilions have Venetian windows and pyramidal roofs with ball finials. At the rear is a pedimented Corinthian portico.	II*
Gatepiers, St Columban's; 54.48089°N 0.62059°W	—	c. 1790	Flanking the entrance to the drive are six stone gate piers. The four central piers have a square plan, and consist of a rusticated column on a pedestal, surmounted by an urn; the outer piers are smaller. The end piers are circular, and have oval capping.	II
Broomfield; 54.46656°N 0.60129°W	—	c. 1800	The house is in stone, and has a slate roof with capped gables and kneelers. There are two storeys and an attic, and three bays. The central doorway has an architrave and a blocked round-arched fanlight with a keystone, and above it is a round-arched stair window with impost blocks and a keystone. The windows are double-hung sashes in moulded flush frames, and there is a small window to the right of the doorway. On the attic are two trompe-l'œil windows.	II
4 and 5 The Carrs; 54.46973°N 0.63060°W	—	18th or early 19th century	A pair of houses in stone with a Welsh slate roof. There are two storeys and four bays. Each house has a modern door with a rectangular fanlight and a flat hood. The windows are double-hung sashes.	II
1 High Street; 54.47171°N 0.63006°W	—	Early 19th century	The house is in stone with a pantile roof. There are three storeys and one bay. The doorway on the left has a rectangular fanlight, and the windows are modern.	II
5 High Street; 54.47158°N 0.63002°W	—	Early 19th century	The house is in rendered stone and has a pantile roof. There are two storeys and two bays. The doorway has a rectangular fanlight, and the windows are modern.	II
7 and 9 High Street; 54.47152°N 0.62996°W	—	Early 19th century	A pair of cottages in brick with a Welsh slate roof. There are two storeys and three bays. Above the window on the right bay is a segmental relieving arch, and on the left is a pedimented porch.	II
Rose Cottage; 54.47167°N 0.63009°W	—	Early 19th century	The cottage is in stone with a pantile roof. There are two storeys and three bays, and a projecting single-storey brick extension on the right. The doorway on the left has a gabled hood, and the windows are modern.	II
The Old Factory; 54.48311°N 0.62371°W		Early 19th century	The factory, later used for other purposes, is in stone, and has a pantile roof. There are three storeys and 14 bays. The windows and the doorway, which is in the middle floor, have keystones.	II
Sneaton Castle; 54.48350°N 0.64242°W		c. 1830 (probable)	The house is in stone with flat roofs. The centre section has two storeys and five bays, and an embattled parapet stepped up in the centre over a coat of arms. In the centre is an enclosed embattled porch containing a doorway with a four-centred arch. The windows are sashes. The centre section is flanked by taller two-storey embattled towers containing sash windows and cross loops. The battlements are machicolated, and on the corners are embattled bartisans.	II
Weighing Machine House; 54.47574°N 0.61504°W	—	c. 1835 (probable)	The machine house was built for the Scarborough and Whitby Railway Company, and is in a ruinous state. It is in stone, with one storey and a semicircular plan. On the northwest front is a large window with a curved surround, on which is a curved cornice. It is flanked by recessed doorways with curved surrounds, and further doorways at right angles. The rear wall is curved and contains three windows, one blocked.	II
Ruswarp railway station 54.46992°N 0.62809°W		1846	The station was designed by George Townsend Andrews for the York and North Midland Railway. It is in stone with quoins, overhanging eaves, and a slate roof with decorative bargeboards and finials. There are two storeys and an L-shaped plan. On the platform front is an internal porch with two four-centred arches, to the right is a canted bay window, and above are two two-light mullioned windows. To the left is a single-storey range and a timber porch.	II
Chapels, Whitby Cemetery; 54.47540°N 0.60984°W		1862	The chapels are in stone, and consist of an archway above which is a lantern and a tall spire, flanked by two chapels. The steeple and the chapel windows have elaborate decoration.	II
Lodge, Whitby Cemetery; 54.47546°N 0.61089°W		1862	The lodge at the entrance to the cemetery is in stone, with a slate roof, and two storeys. On the front are two bays, the left bay projecting under a gable with kneelers. To its right is a gabled porch, and further to the right is a gabled half-dormer. On the left bay is a canted bay window, and the other windows are mullioned and contain lights with shaped pointed heads. At the rear is a single-storey wing.	II
St Bartholomew's Church; 54.47034°N 0.62973°W		1868–69	The church is built in Grosmont sandstone, and has a Welsh slate roof with terracotta ridge tiles. It consists of a nave, a south porch, a south Lady chapel, a chancel with an apse, and a southeast steeple. The steeple has a tower with five stages, angle buttresses, a semicircular stair turret, external steps with a wrought iron balustrade leading to the vestry, lancet windows, clock faces, a dentilled string course, and paired louvred bell openings. The tower is surmounted by an octagonal broach spire with pyramidal pinnacles on the corners, two tiers of gabled lucarnes, a band of triangular openings, and a weathercock.	II
Larpool Viaduct; 54.47456°N 0.61860°W		1882–84	The viaduct was built by the Scarborough and Whitby Railway to carry its line over the River Esk. It is in brick, and has 13 round arches on tapering piers. The viaduct is 915 feet (279 m) in length and 129 feet (39 m) in height.	II
