= Ruswarp Mill =

Building in Ruswarp, North Yorkshire, England

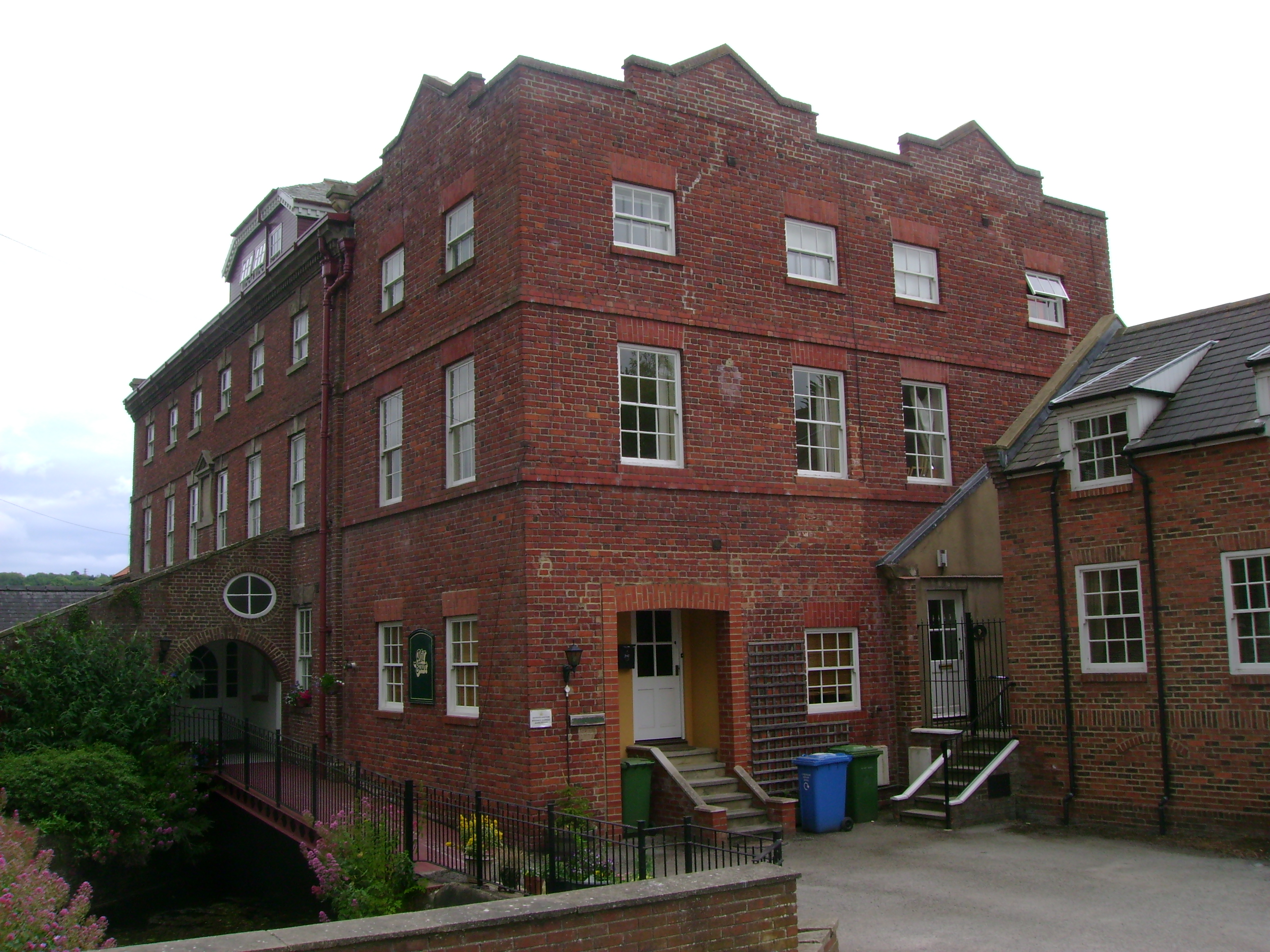
- The building in 2009

- Location within North Yorkshire

General information
- Status: Converted into flats
- Type: Watermill (former)
- Location: The Carrs, Ruswarp, North Yorkshire, England
- Coordinates: 54°28′10″N 0°37′49″W
- Year built: 1752
- Renovated: c. 1911 (interior rebuilt)
- Closed: 1989 (as a mill)
- Client: Nathaniel Cholmley

Design and construction
- Engineer: Philip Williams

Listed Building – Grade II
- Official name: Ruswarp Mill
- Designated: 23 February 1954
- Reference no.: 1316365

Ruswarp Mill is a historic building on The Carrs in Ruswarp, a village in North Yorkshire, England.

A mill in Ruswarp was recorded in the Domesday Book. The current watermill, on the River Esk, was built in 1752 for Nathaniel Cholmley, by Philip Williams. In 1911, it suffered a major fire, with the interior destroyed, but it was soon rebuilt. In both 1930 and 1931, it flooded, the water reaching the second floor, and a boat from Whitby Lifeboat Station was dragged overland to rescue people from the mill offices. The building was Grade II listed in 1954. The mill closed in 1989, and the building was then converted into flats.

The mill is built of red brick, with floor bands, a dentilled eaves cornice, and a half-hipped slate roof. It has three storeys, fronts of six and three bays and lean-tos. The windows are sashes with stone heads and keystones. On the front is an inscribed and dated plaque in a shaped frame.

== See also ==
- Listed buildings in Whitby (outer areas)
