= Larpool Mill =

Cottage in Whitby, North Yorkshire, England

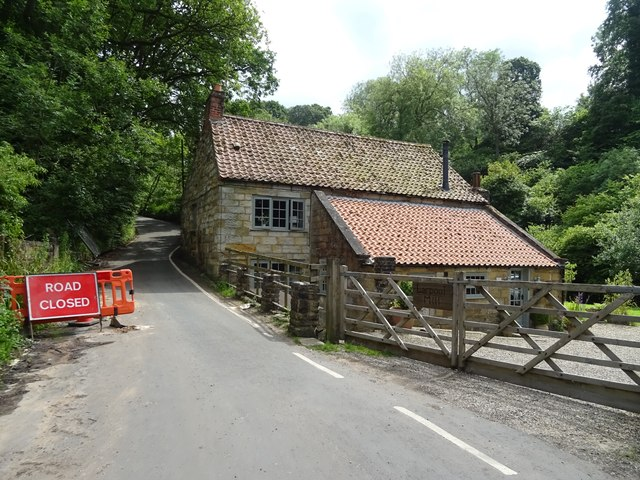
- The building in 2024

- Location within North Yorkshire

General information
- Status: Converted to holiday accommodation
- Type: Watermill (former)
- Location: Glen Esk Road, Whitby, North Yorkshire, England
- Coordinates: 54°28′13″N 0°37′13″W
- Year built: 18th century

Listed Building – Grade II
- Official name: Larpool Mill
- Designated: 4 December 1972
- Reference no.: 1148243

Larpool Mill is a historic building on Glen Esk Road in Whitby, a town in North Yorkshire, England.

The watermill was constructed in the 18th century to grind corn. It is located on the Cock Mill Beck in Larpool Wood. It was later converted into holiday accommodation; despite its apparently small size, it has five bedrooms. The building was Grade II listed in 1972. Historic England states that it was listed for its "visual importance in [a] picturesque setting".

The cottage is built of stone with a pantile roof, and has two storeys. Projecting from the front is a single-storey pentice with a modern door and window. The main part has a small double-hung sash window, and a modern window below. At the rear are three small windows.

== See also ==
- Listed buildings in Whitby (outer areas)
