= Grossmont =

Grossmont may refer to:

- Grossmont College, a community college in El Cajon, California
- Grossmont High School, in La Mesa, California
- Grossmont Middle College High School, in El Cajon, California
- Grossmont Transit Center, a San Diego Trolley station
- Grossmont Union High School District in San Diego County, California
- Sharp Grossmont Hospital, in La Mesa, California

== See also ==
- Grosmont (disambiguation)
