= Ruswarp Hydro =

Hydroelectric power station in North Yorkshire, England

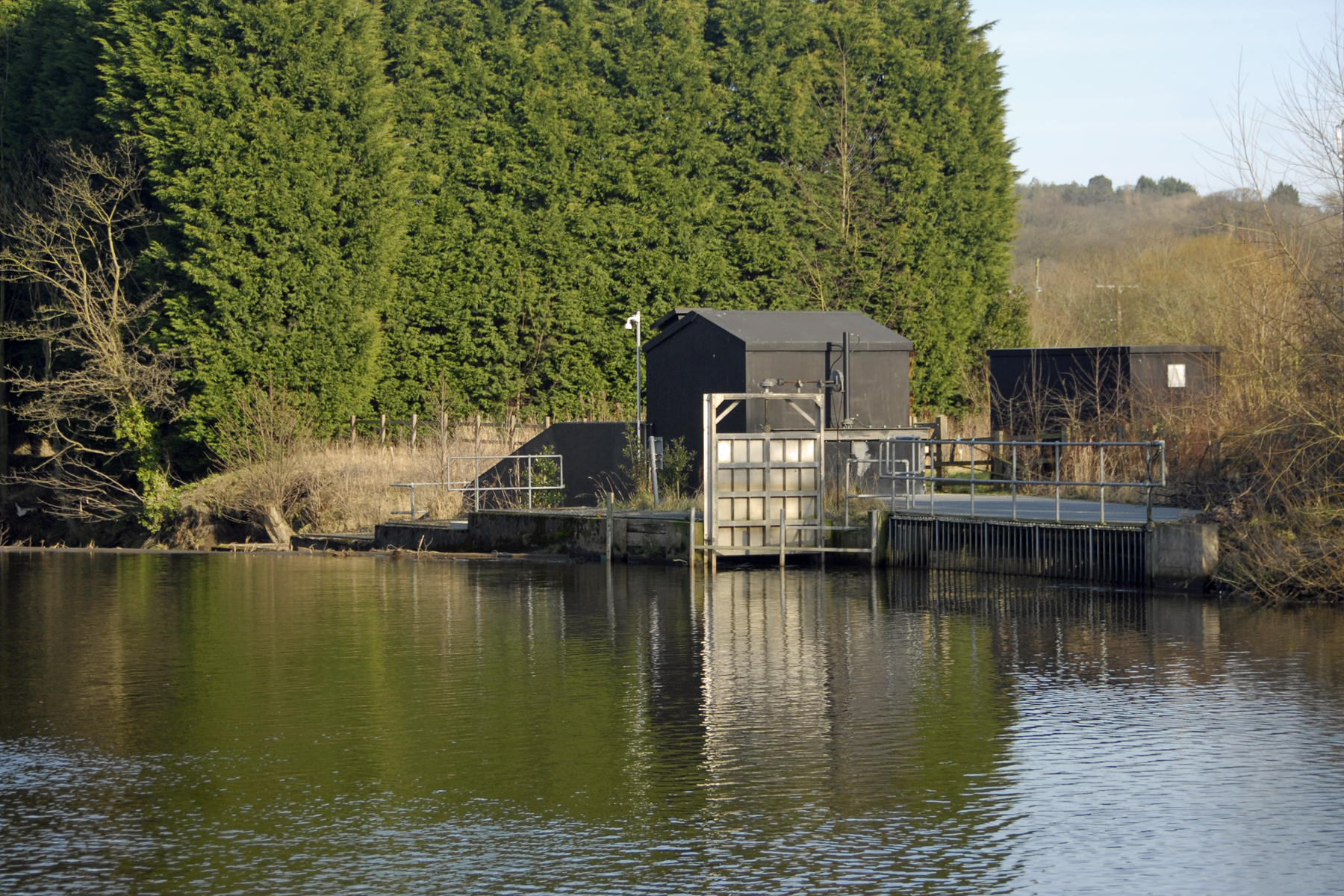
- Ruswarp Hydro plant on the River Esk
- Official name: Whitby Esk Energy
- Country: England
- Location: Ruswarp
- Coordinates: 54°28′05.6″N 0°38′01.3″W
- Status: Operational
- Construction began: May 2012
- Commission date: 12 December 2012
- Owner: Whitby Esk Energy

Power generation
- Units operational: One
- Nameplate capacity: 50kW
- Annual net output: 150,000–160,000 kWh

External links
- Website: whitbyeskenergy.org.uk

Ruswarp Hydro or Whitby Esk Energy, is a Hydroelectric generation scheme that operates on the River Esk at Ruswarp, North Yorkshire, England. The project uses an Archimedes Screw in a reverse direction to generate electricity and was funded by people in the community. Around 4 tonnes (4.4 tons) of water pass along the screw per second, which generates enough electricity to power 45–48 homes.

== History ==
Esk Energy (Yorkshire) was formed as an industrial and provident society in 2008 to explore the idea behind a green energy scheme in Eskdale. Initially, windpower was researched but it was decided that a wind turbine would be visually intrusive in the North York Moors National Park. After a river survey and an approval was made by the Environment Agency, the collective pressed ahead with the hydro scheme.

Provisional planning for the scheme was given the go-ahead in October 2009 and a co-operative was formed to raise the capital needed for the project. The money raising culminated in a share option to raise extra funding of the £450,000 that was required for the scheme. With the funding secured, construction started in May 2012 with the plant being commissioned into service on 12 December 2012.

The Archimedes Screw that was built for the scheme arrived on site in September 2012 and was installed by October of the same year. The screw is 2.9 metres (9 ft 6 in) wide and 11 metres (36 ft) long and will allow a maximum 4 tonnes (4.4 tons) of water to pass through a second. The screw is wide enough to allow fish to move through downstream with only a very low risk of harm. At the time that the project was being built the North York Moors Park Authority rebuilt the fishpass adjacent to the turbine. The screw generates up 160,000 kilowatt hours per year, which is enough electricity to power 45–48 homes, and reduces carbon emissions by up to 70 tonnes (77 tons) per year.

Even though the National Park Authority was satisfied that the development would have no detriment to the ecology or hydrology to the river, some in the community were upset that they were not fully informed about the prospect and possible ramifications of the hydro scheme. Parts of the local community were unaware that when the river was in low flow the water would not go through the screw but over the weir or through the fish pass as normal, claiming that this had not been communicated to them.
