= Larpool Hall, Whitby =

Historic house in North Yorkshire, England

Coordinates: 54°28′17.2″N 0°36′51.1″W

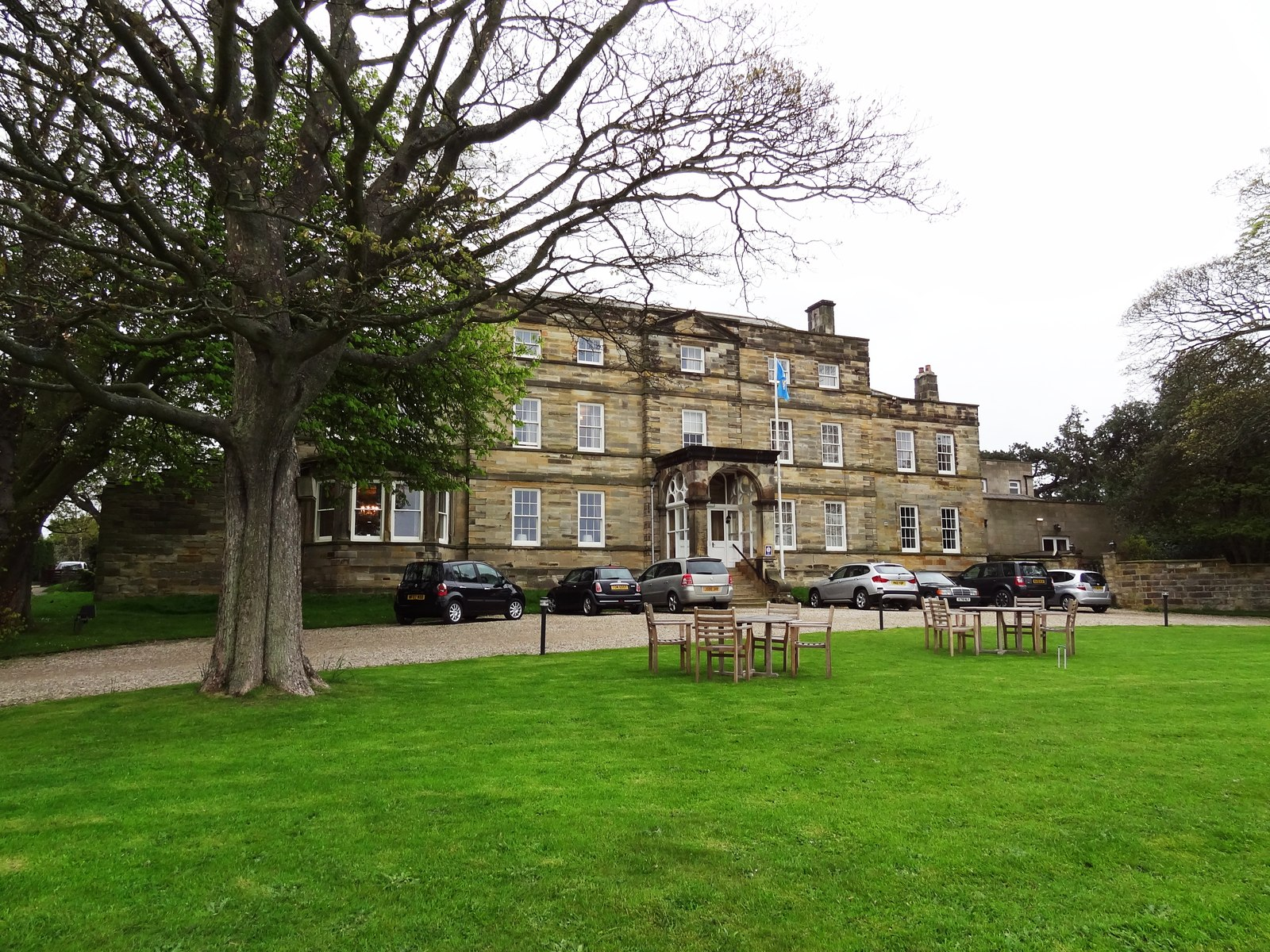
Larpool Hall, Whitby

Larpool Hall, Whitby in Yorkshire is a Georgian house of historical significance and is a Grade II listed building. It was built in the late 1780s and was a private residence for about two centuries. It is now a hotel which provides accommodation and a sociable bar.

== Early history ==
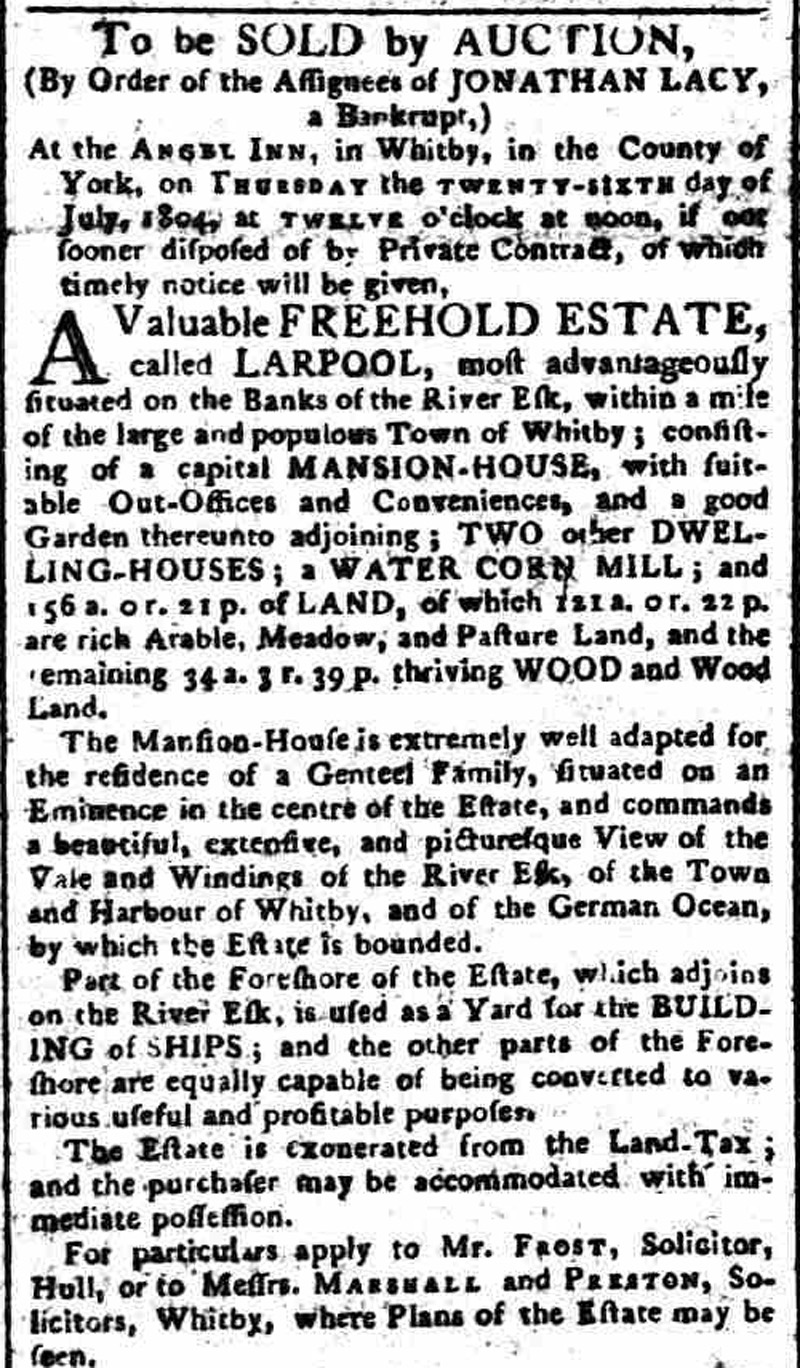
Sale notice for Larpool Hall, 1804

One of the earliest residents who may be the originator of the mansion was Jonathan Lacy (1741–1827). Jonathan was born in 1741 in Whitby. He became a shipbuilder and for some time operated a shipyard on the Larpool Estate near the river. In 1764 he married Jane Brown the daughter of Jonas Brown, a very wealthy merchant of Whitby. Her brother Thomas Brown was a leader in the American Revolution.

In 1803 Jonathan was declared bankrupt and the following year Larpool Hall was placed on the market for sale. The sale notice is shown. At this time the house was described as a mansion which is “extremely well adapted as the residence of a genteel family situated on an eminence in the centre of the estate and commands a beautiful, extensive and picturesque view of the vale and windings of the River Esk.”

== The Turton family ==
John Turton (1735–1806) appears to have bought the property. He was the royal physician to King George III and the Queen. He also owned Brasted Place where he mostly lived. He died in 1806 and his Estates passed to his wife Mary. When she died in 1810 his property passed in 1817 to his great nephew Edmund Peters who assumed the name of Turton.

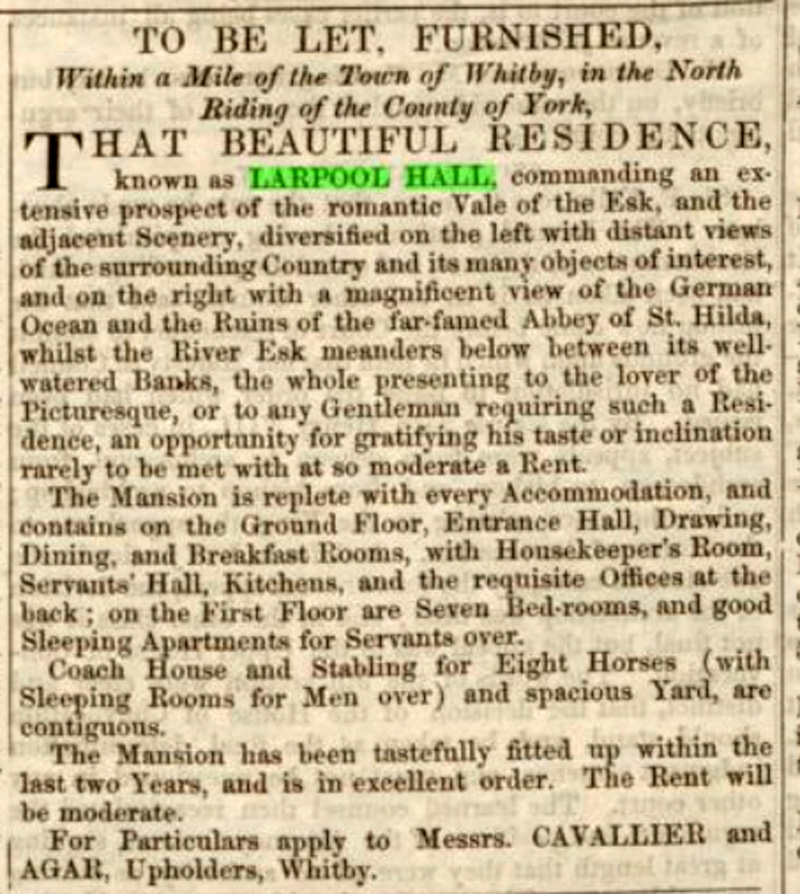
Rental notice for Larpool Hall, 1850

Edmund (Peters) Turton (1796–1857) was born in 1796 in Yorkshire. His father was Matthew William Peters a famous painter who later became a clergyman. Edmund became a politician and for two years was the Member for Hendon. In 1822 he married Marianne Livesey, daughter of Robert Bell Livesey of Kildale Hall. The couple lived at Brasted Place but also visited Larpool Hall. Edmund’s brother George Augustus Peters also appears to be a resident of the Hall for some years. In 1850 the Hall was rented and a notice was placed in the newspaper which described the house at this time. The rental notice is shown.

Edmund had one son Captain Edmund Henry Turton (1825–1896) who inherited Larpool Hall when Edmund died in 1857. Edmund Henry Turton, his son, was born in 1825 at Kildale Hall which was now owned by the Turton family. At the age of 16 he joined the 3rd Dragoon Guards and served there for the next 17 years becoming a Captain. When his father died in 1857 he resigned and assumed responsibility for his inherited estates. In 1856 he married Lady Cecilia Mary Leeson, daughter of Joseph Leeson, 4th Earl of Milltown. The couple lived at Larpool Hall until 1876 when they moved to their other property Upsall Castle. The Hall was then rented for about 20 years and was mainly occupied by Colonel James Menzies Clayhills (1834–1919). Captain Edmund Henry Turton died in 1896 and his wife Cecilia moved back to Larpool Hall and remained there until her death in 1903. The property was then inherited by the eldest son Sir Edmund Russborough Turton, 1st Bt.

In about 1919 he sold the Hall. From February to May 1941, the Hall was used as billets for soldiers of 7th Battalion, The Loyal Regiment (North Lancashire), who were on anti-invasion duties along the nearby coast. It became a Children’s Home until 1966. After that it was a Field Studies Centre and then became a hotel.

== See also ==
- Listed buildings in Whitby (outer areas)
