= St Hilda's Church, Sneaton =

Church in Sneaton, North Yorkshire, England

Coordinates: 54.4583°N 0.6225°W

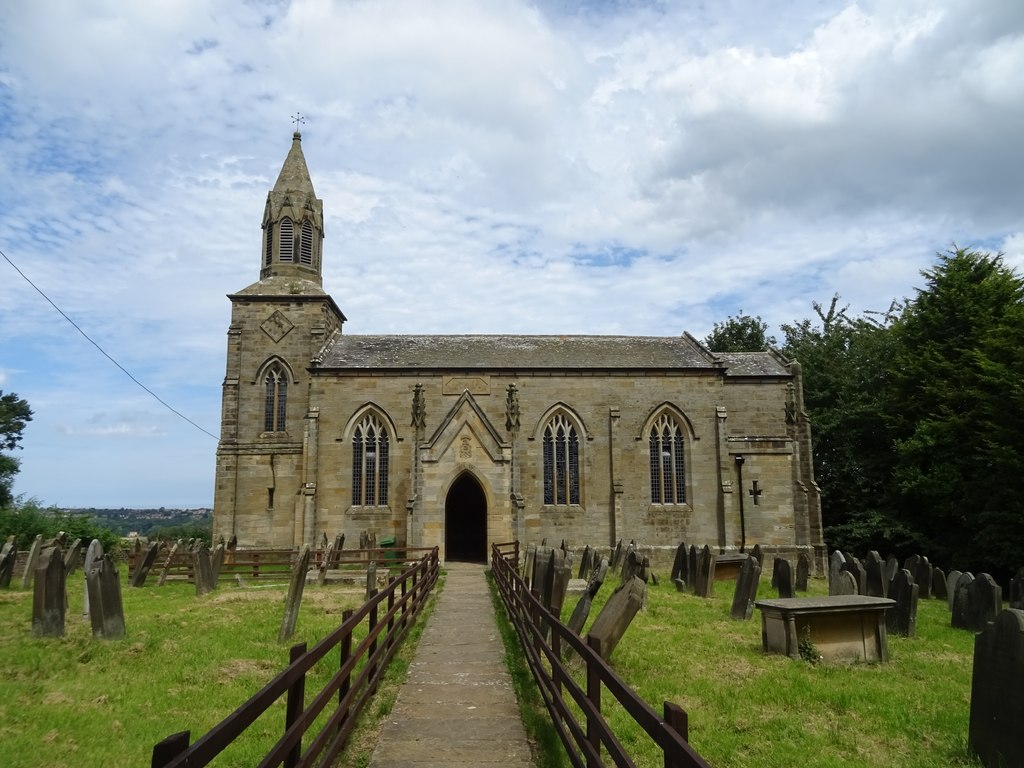
The church, in 2024

St Hilda's Church is the parish church of Sneaton, a village in North Yorkshire, in England.

A church was built in Sneaton in the 12th century, and was first recorded in 1131 as a chapel of ease of St Mary's Church, Whitby. It was in the Norman style, but was heavily altered over the centuries. In 1350, it was given its own parish. It was demolished and a new church was built between 1823 and 1825, with funding from James Wilson. The building was designed by Will Hurst in the Gothick style, of which it is described by the Victoria County History as "a poor example". It measures 80 feet (24 m) by 30 feet (9.1 m), and the spire is about 60 feet (18 m) tall. The building was grade II listed in 1989.

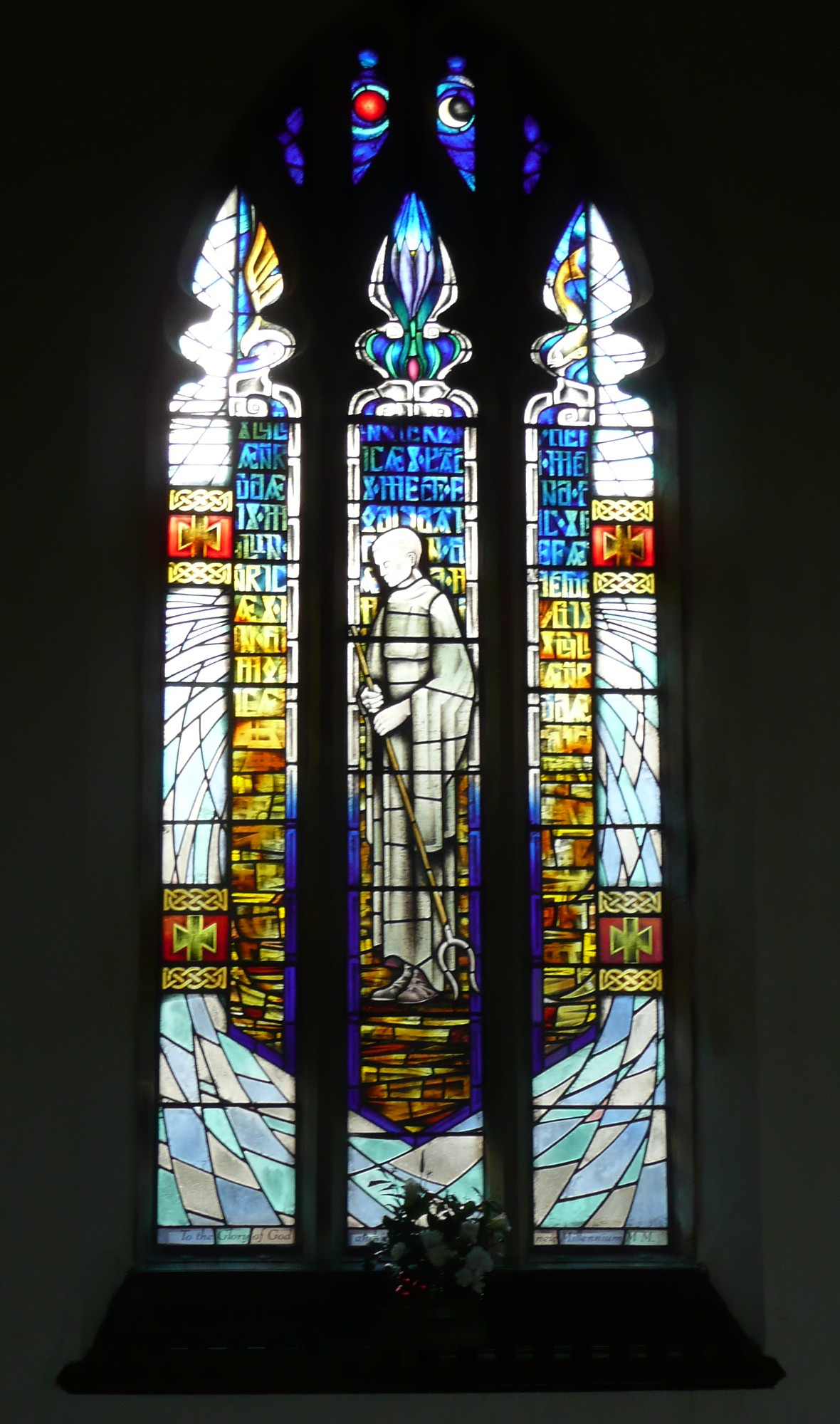
Window depicting Caedmon

The church is built of sandstone with slate roofs, and consists of a nave, a south porch, a chancel and a west tower. The tower has two stages, shouldered angle buttresses, slit lights in the lower stage and two-light windows with a pointed head and hood moulds above. Above is an octagonal lantern with louvred bell openings under lucarnes, and an octagonal spire with a wrought iron cross. The porch is gabled and flanked by buttresses rising to crocketed pinnacles, and above it is an inscribed and dated panel. Inside, there is a square stone font dating from the 12th century, a timber chancel screen, and some monuments dating from the 1830s. The east window has stained glass designed by Walter Ernest Tower, and there is a window installed around 2000, depicting Caedmon.

== See also ==
- Listed buildings in Sneaton
