= Listed buildings in Sneaton =

Sneaton is a civil parish in the county of North Yorkshire, England. It contains 14 listed buildings that are recorded in the National Heritage List for England. All the listed buildings are designated at Grade II, the lowest of the three grades, which is applied to "buildings of national importance and special interest". The parish contains the village of Sneaton and the surrounding countryside and moorland. The listed buildings include houses, cottages and associated structures, two farmhouses, two wayside crosses, a church and associated structures, a hotel and a public house, and a former school.

== Buildings ==
Name and location	Photograph	Date	Notes
John Cross; 54.41179°N 0.61466°W		Medieval	A wayside cross and boundary marker, the cross socket stone being the older part, and the boundary stone dating from the 18th century. The socket stone is rectangular, and has a hollowed socket. The boundary stone has the initial 'C' inscribed on the east face, and it replaces the former cross shaft, which is now recumbent.
York Cross; 54.40158°N 0.64814°W		Medieval	A wayside cross, also known as Jack Cross, it consists of a sandstone socket with a gritstone shaft. The socket stone is square, and on it is a broken shaft, about 1 metre (3 ft 3 in) high, both parts with inscriptions.
Low Farmhouse; 54.45692°N 0.61916°W	—	Late 17th to early 18th century	The farmhouse is in sandstone and has a pantile roof with coped gables and plain kneelers. There are two storeys and three bays. On the front is a doorway and a mix of sash and casement windows.
Sea View; 54.45763°N 0.62139°W		Early 18th century	One of a pair of cottages, in whitewashed sandstone, with a pantile roof and a coped gable and plain kneeler on the right. There is one storey and attic, and three bays. In the centre is a doorway, flanked by tripartite windows with central sashes, and above the left window is a raking dormer. On the right return is a reverse crow-stepped gable.
White Cottage; 54.45692°N 0.61874°W	—	18th century	The house, which was later extended, is in sandstone with a pantile roof. There are two storeys and two bays. On the front is a doorway in a projecting gabled extension, with a tripartite sash window to the left and a fire window further to the left. The upper floor windows are two-light horizontally-sliding sashes.
Abbey View; 54.45738°N 0.61870°W	—	Mid to late 18th century	The house is in sandstone, and has a pantile roof with coped gables and shaped kneelers. There are two storeys and three bays. The central doorway has a fanlight, and the windows are sashes.
Manor House Farmhouse; 54.45749°N 0.62598°W		Mid to late 18th century	The farmhouse is in sandstone, and has a Roman tile roof with coped gables and shaped kneelers. There are two storeys and five bays, and an extension to the left of one storey and an attic, and one bay. The doorway in the left bay of the main part has a divided fanlight, and a long lintel with a keystone, and the windows are sash window. On the extension is a tripartite sash window and a raking dormer.
Midge Hall; 54.41881°N 0.63281°W		Mid to late 18th century	The house is in sandstone on a chamfered plinth, with a floor band, a projecting eaves band, and a pantile roof with coped gables and plain kneelers. There are two storeys, three bays and an outshut. In the centre is a gabled porch, above it is a blind window, and the other windows are sashes with wedge lintels.
Gate piers and garden wall, Midge Hall; 54.41884°N 0.63269°W		Late 18th century	The wall and the gate piers and the garden wall to the east of the house are in sandstone. The walls are about 1.1 metres (3 ft 7 in) in height and have flat coping. The piers are about 1.35 metres (4 ft 5 in) in height, and have shaped caps.
Sneaton Hall Hotel; 54.45771°N 0.62555°W		Late 18th century	A small country house that was extended at the sides and rear in the early 19th century, and later converted into a hotel. The original part is in pebbledashed sandstone, the extensions are in rusticated sandstone, all parts have quoins and slate roofs, and two have coped gables, shaped kneelers, and ball and pedestal finials. There are two storeys, the main block has three bays, and an extension on the right, and recessed on the left is an extension with a hipped roof. In the centre of the main block is a Doric porch with an overhanging cornice, a fluted frieze and bulbous finials, and a doorway with pilasters. The windows are sashes, and on the left return is a round-headed stair window.
St Hilda's Church; 54.45839°N 0.62244°W		1823–25	The church is in sandstone with slate roofs, and consists of a nave, a south porch, a chancel and a west tower. The tower has two stages, shouldered angle buttresses, slit lights in the lower stage and two-light windows with a pointed head and hood moulds above. Above is an octagonal lantern with louvred bell openings under lucarnes, and an octagonal spire with a wrought iron cross. The porch is gabled and flanked by buttresses rising to crocketed pinnacles, and above it is an inscribed and dated panel.
Gateway and walls, St Hilda's Church; 54.45810°N 0.62266°W		c. 1825	At the entrance to the churchyard are wrought iron gates, and a segmental-arched structure with a lantern. These are flanked by square sandstone gate piers with flat caps, and ball and pedestal finials. Outside them are sandstone walls about 1 metre (3 ft 3 in) high with flat coping. To the east of the gateway are mounting blocks.
Old School; 54.45788°N 0.62328°W		1825	The school, later converted for residential use, is in sandstone, and has a slate roof with coped gables and plain kneelers. There is one storey and three bays. In the centre is a gabled porch in rusticated stone, and the outer bays contain windows with pointed arches with hollow-chamfered surrounds. At the rear and on the right return are windows with pointed arches.
The Wilson Arms; 54.45718°N 0.61844°W		Early 19th century	The public house is in whitewashed render, and has a pantile roof with coped gables and plain kneelers. There are two storeys and five bays. The doorway in the second bay has a flat hood mould and a pent porch. The windows are sashes with stone surrounds, and one is tripartite. On the upper floor is a low-relief carving of a coat of arms.
