= Thomas Chambers (painter) =

American painter

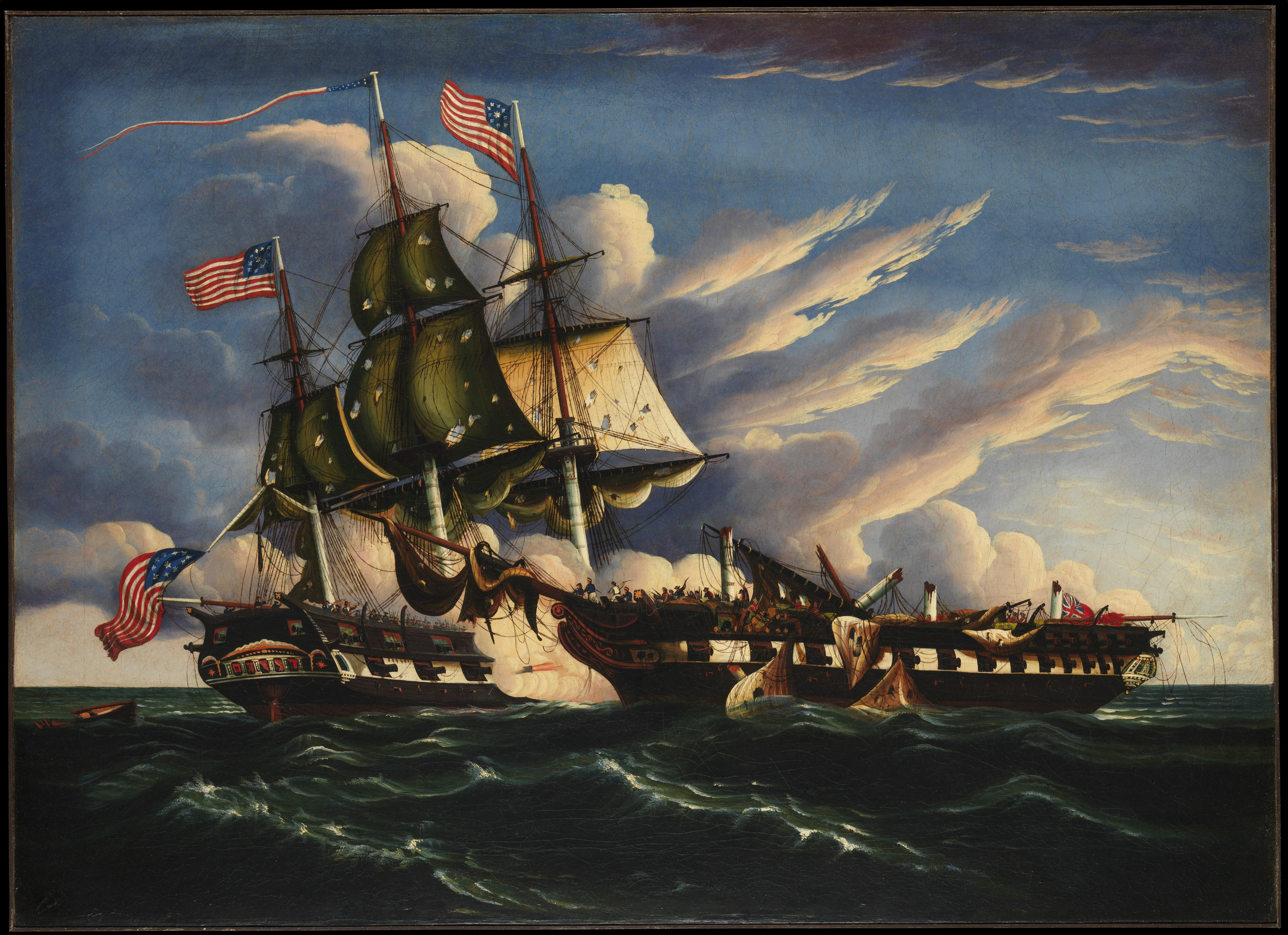
The Constitution and the Guerriere (c. 1845), the first painting identified as his.

Thomas Chambers (1808–1869) was an English-born painter who spent most of his life in the United States. He is generally classified as a Primitivist, but has also been called the "First American Modern". Most of his paintings were unsigned, which delayed his recognition.

== Life and career ==
His father was a merchant sailor, and his mother a laundress. His artistic education, if any, is not a matter of record, although he almost certainly worked with his brother, George, who was self-taught but became a prominent marine artist. It is possible that he was apprenticed to an engraver. He emigrated to the United States in 1832, shortly after George was granted the patronage of King William IV. First, he went to New Orleans and filed a declaration of intent to become a naturalized citizen. From 1834 to 1843, he was in the New York City Directory as a painter and restorer.

This was followed by a period (1843–1851) in Boston, then he spent some time in Albany before returning to New York, around 1857. Many of his works feature the Hudson River Valley, but he was not influenced by the Hudson River School of painting. He also painted scenes from the Connecticut Valley. He never exhibited, but often sold his paintings at auction. Around 1866, he returned to England, penniless and disabled, where he died in a poorhouse. He was buried in Whitby Cemetery.

He was virtually unacknowledged until 1942, when the discovery of a signed painting connected him to a large number of distinctively flamboyant marine and landscape paintings from the mid 19th century that were previously unattributed. His debut exhibition was in New York, that same year, at the Macbeth Gallery. Over sixty-five paintings have now been positively identified as his, and numerous others have been tentatively attributed. Many of his works were loosely based on engravings by other artists; notably William Henry Bartlett, but he is known to have painted en plein air. He also painted portraits, but none have been identified.

== Gallery ==
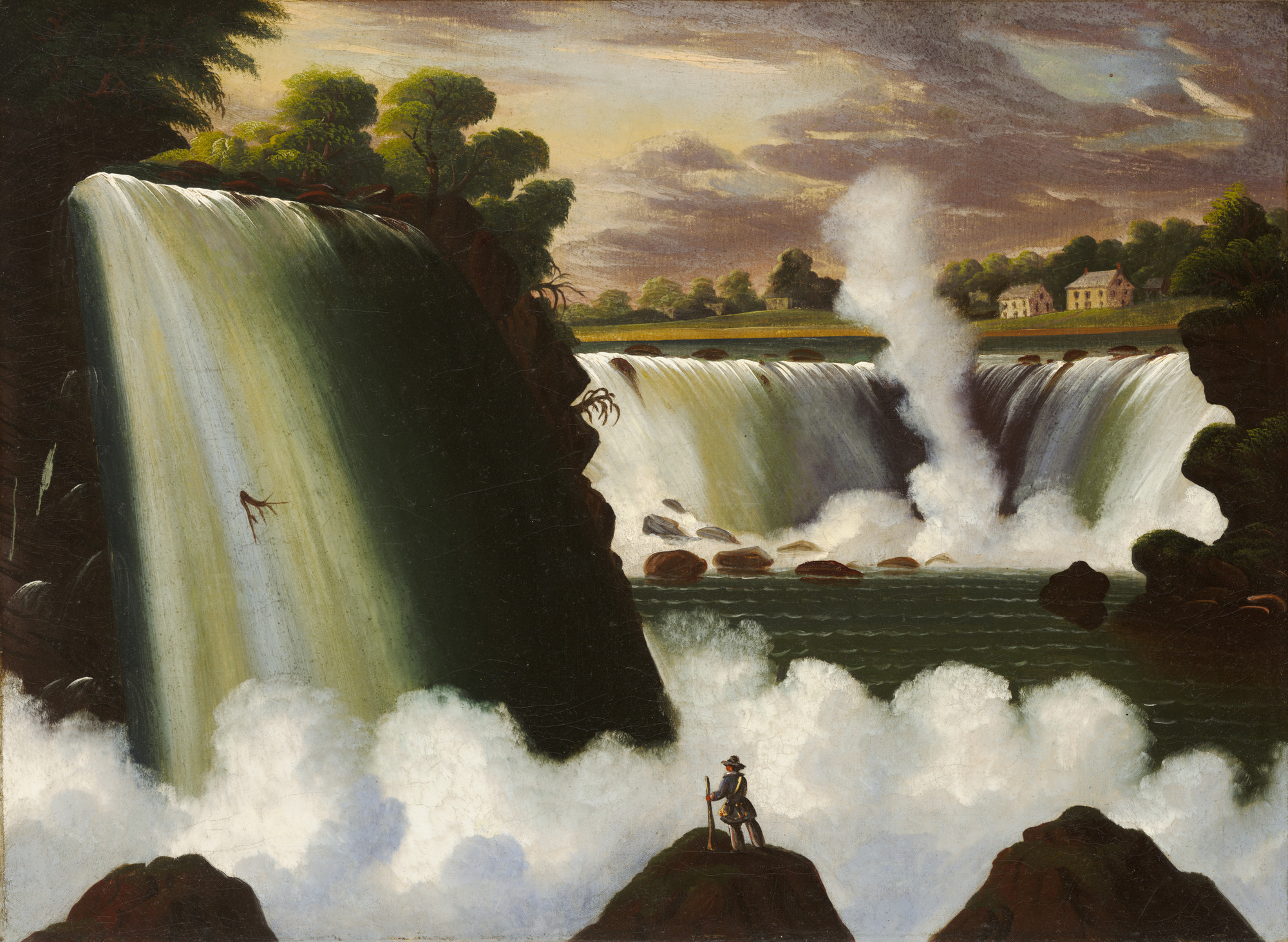
Niagara Falls

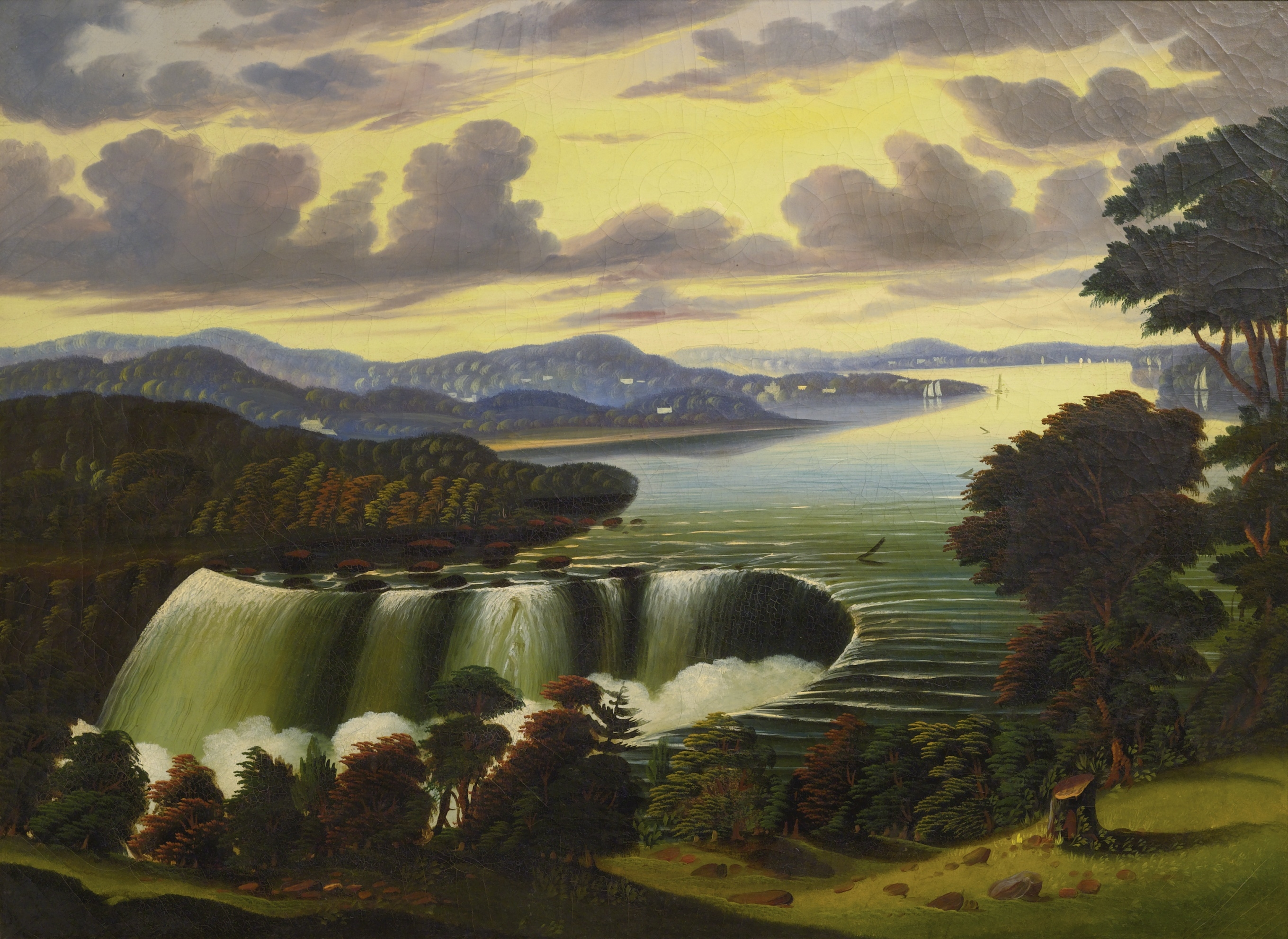
Niagara Falls viewed from Goat Island

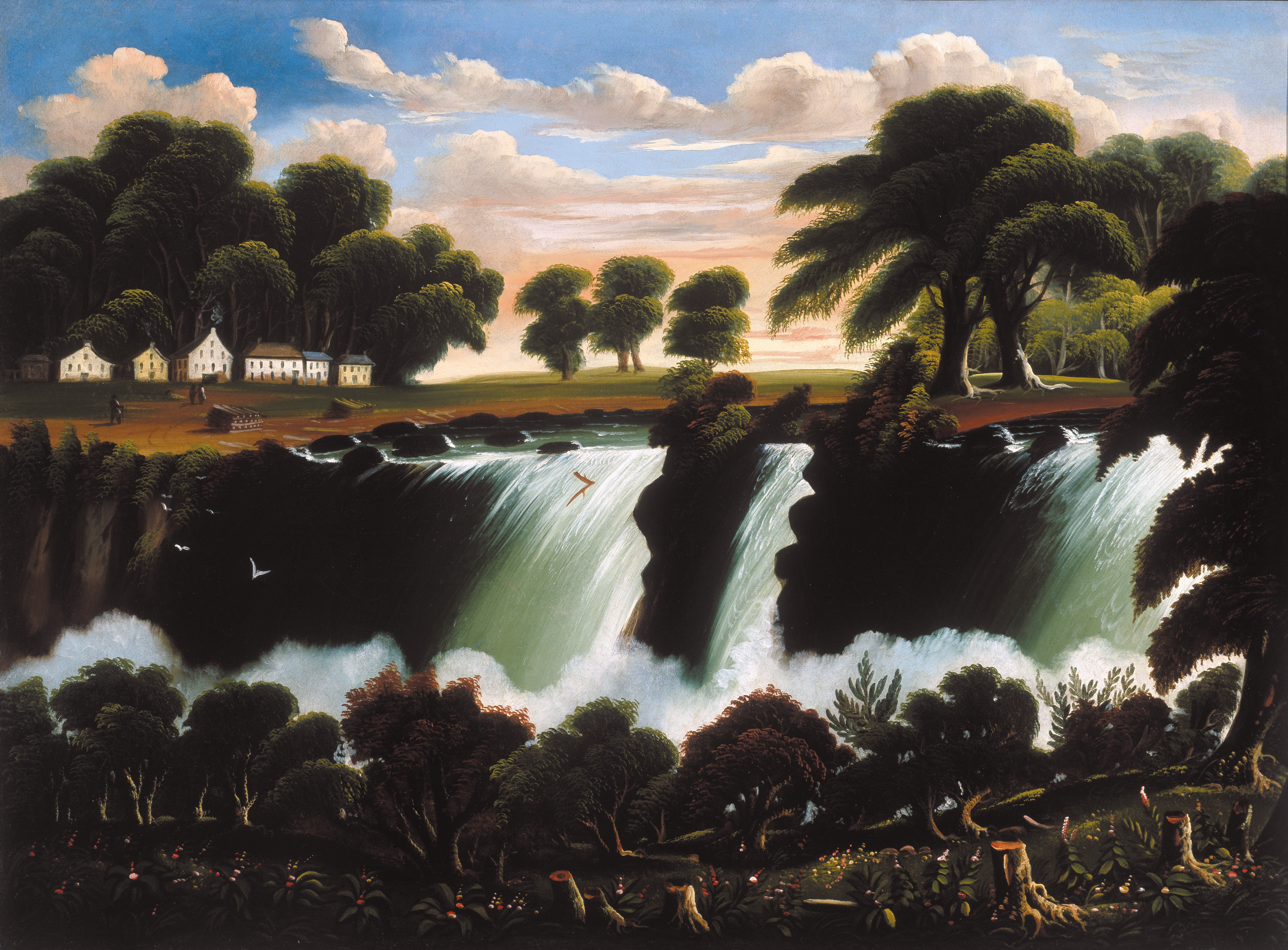
Genesee Falls, Rochester

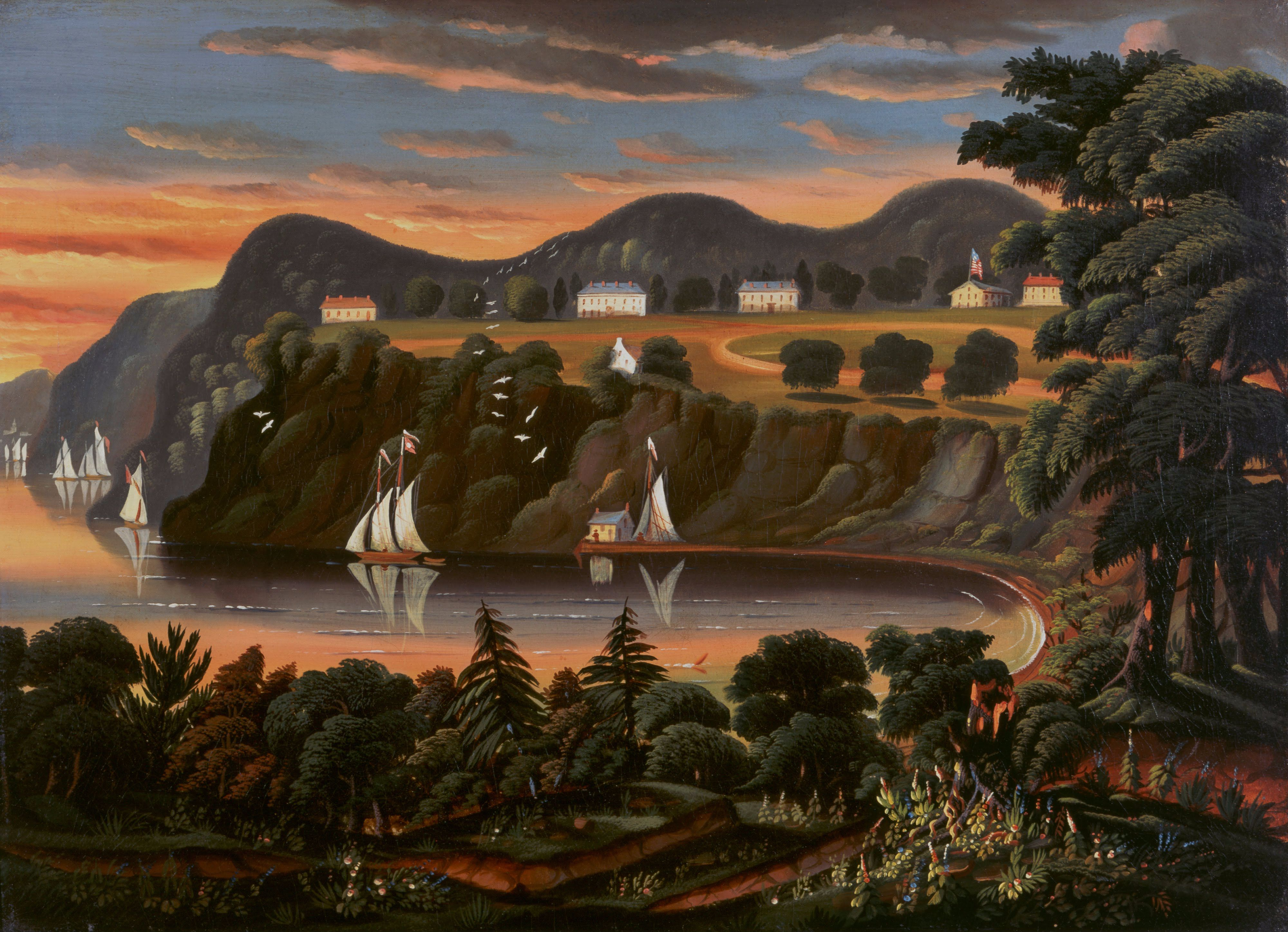
View of Hudson River at West Point

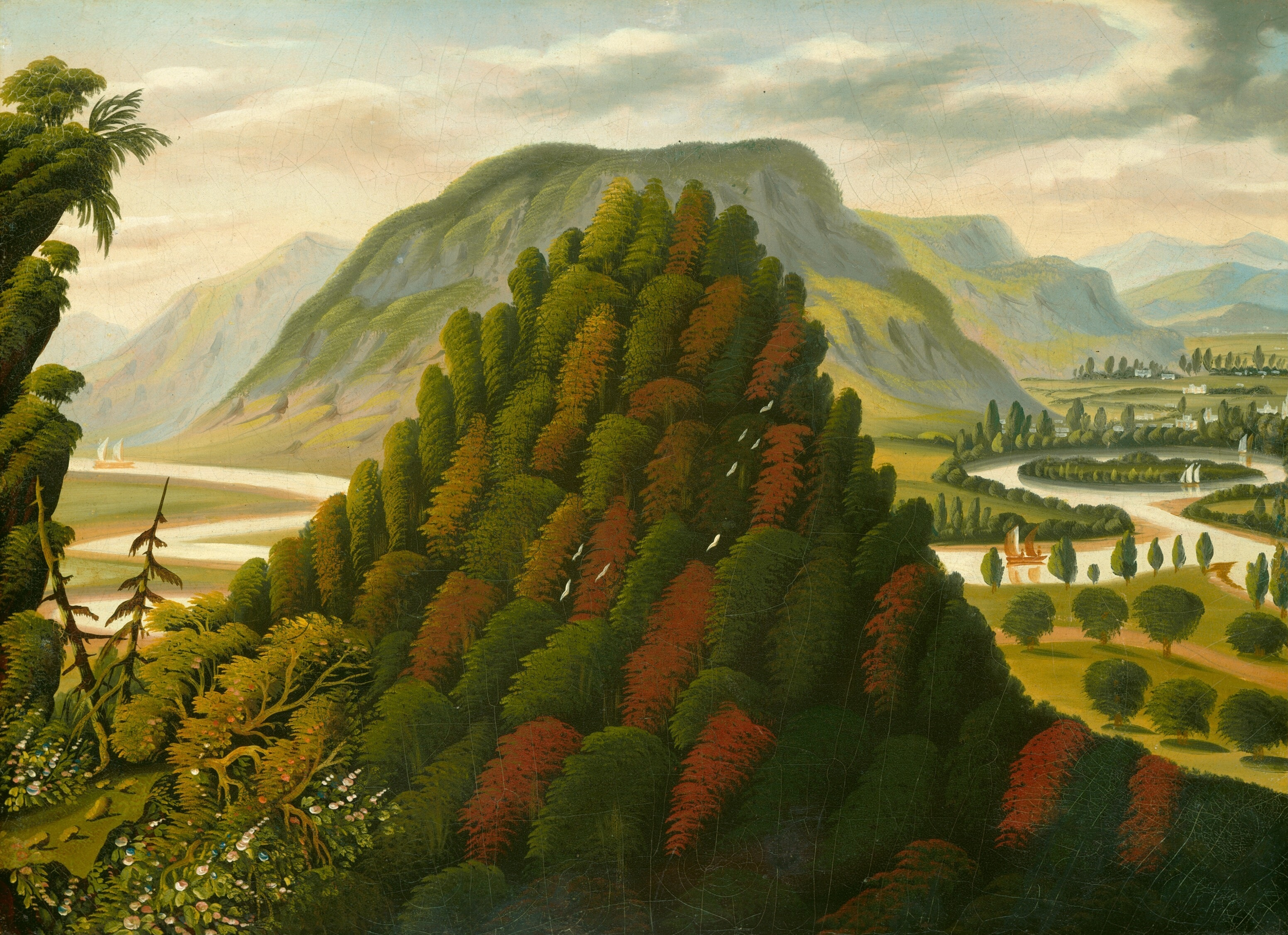
The Connecticut Valley

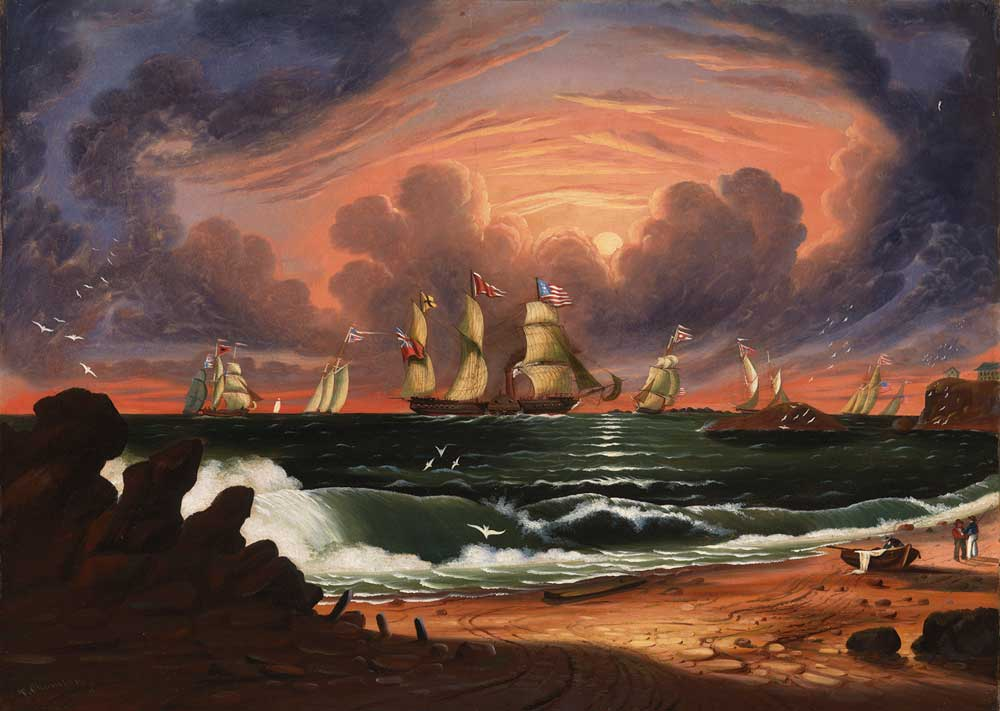
View from Nahant at Sunset

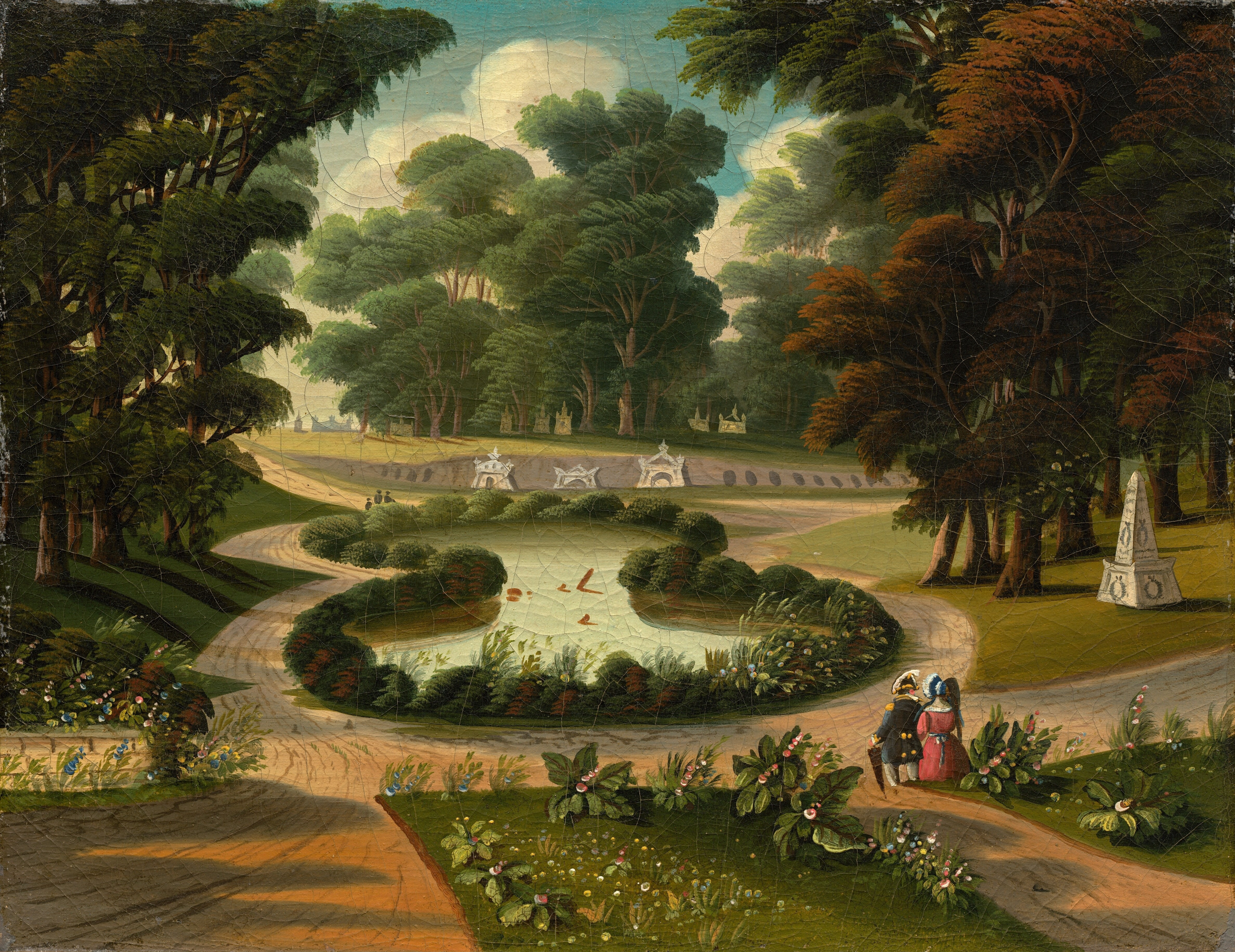
Mount Auburn Cemetery

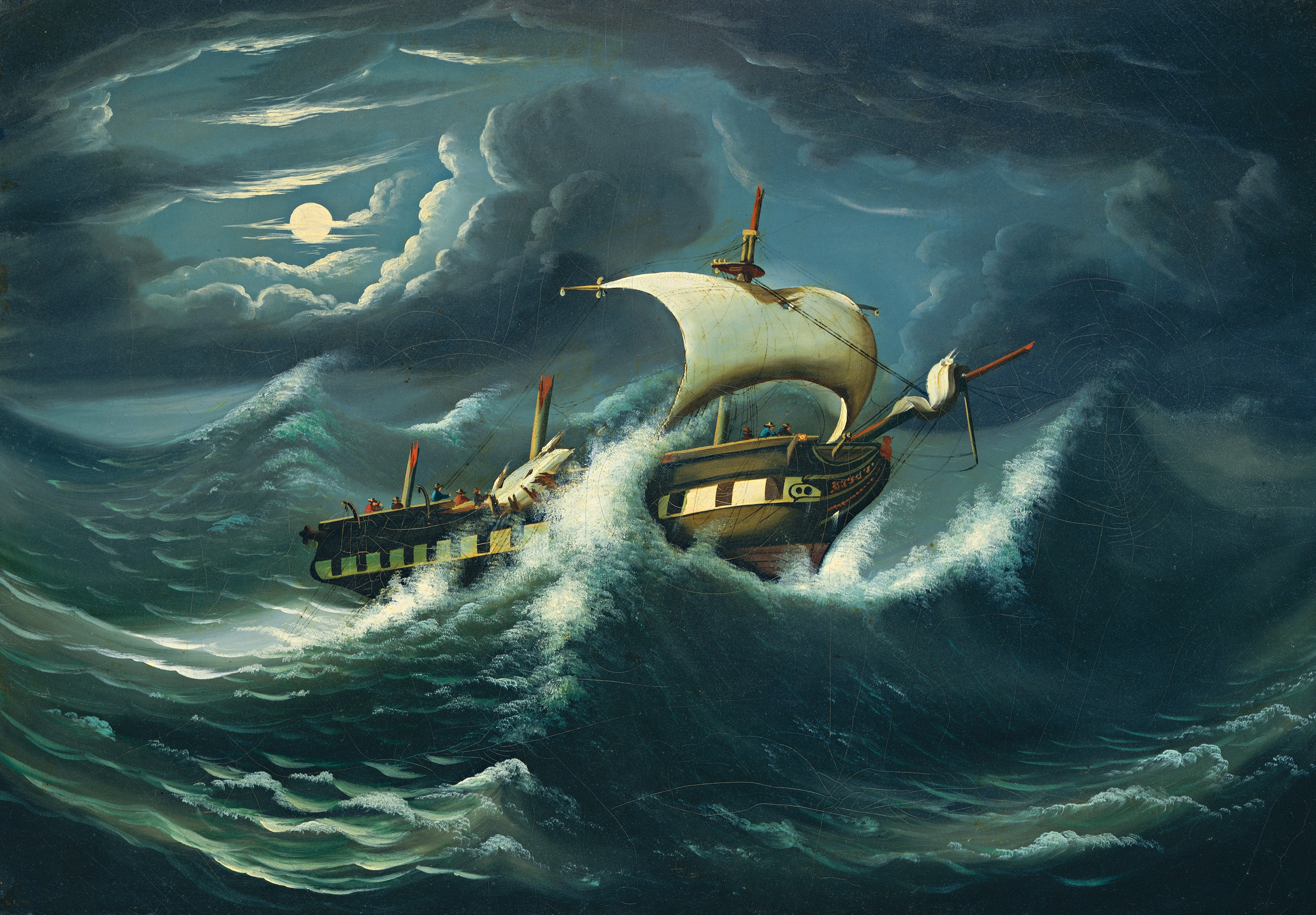
Storm-Tossed Frigate

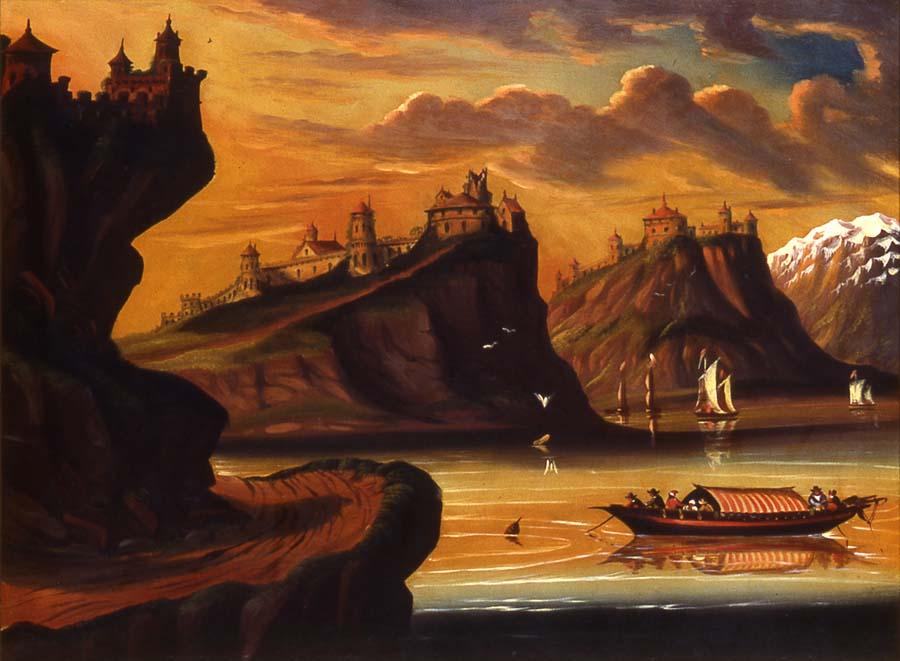
Castles of the Mind

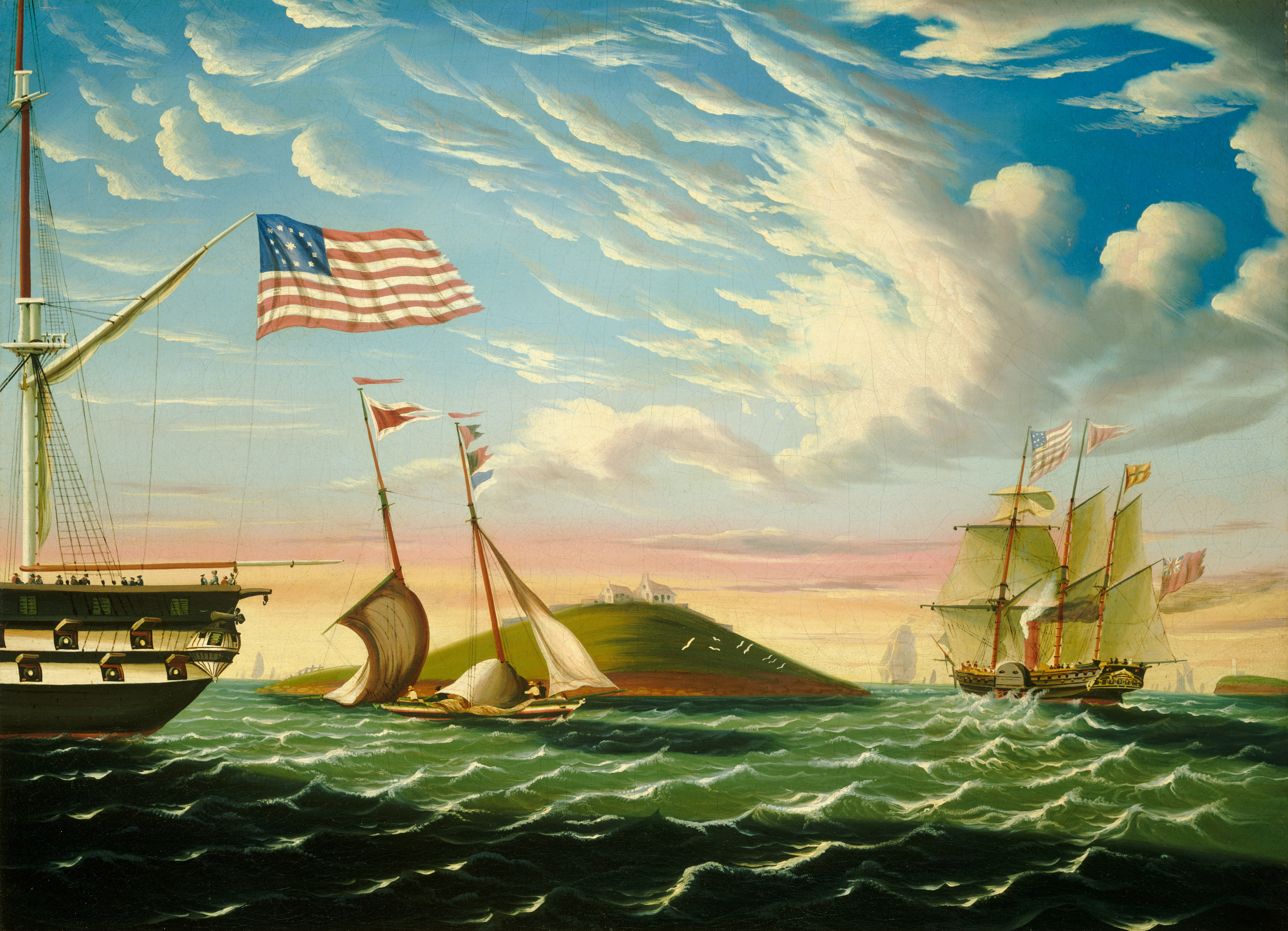
Boston Harbor

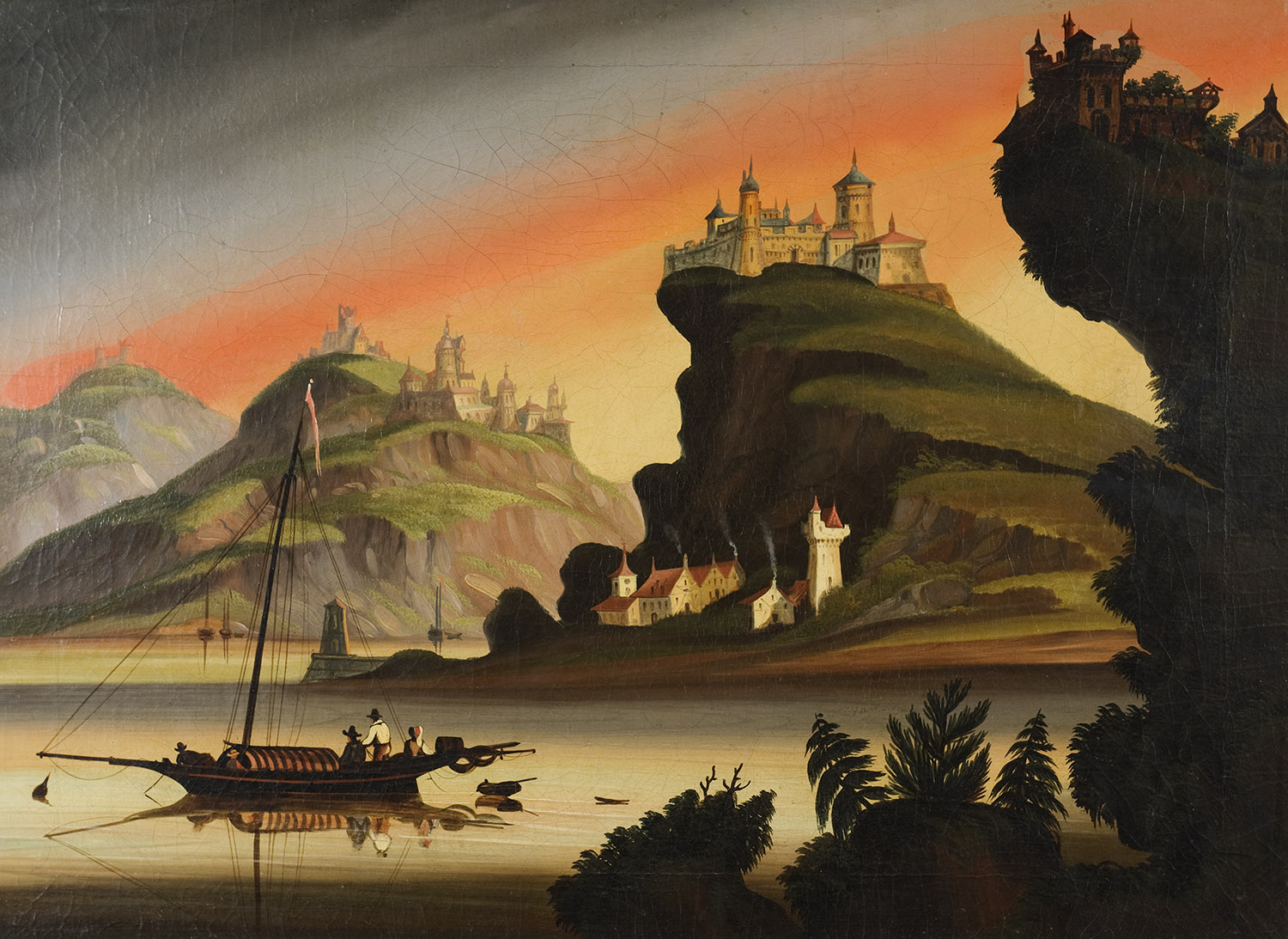
Castles on the Rhine

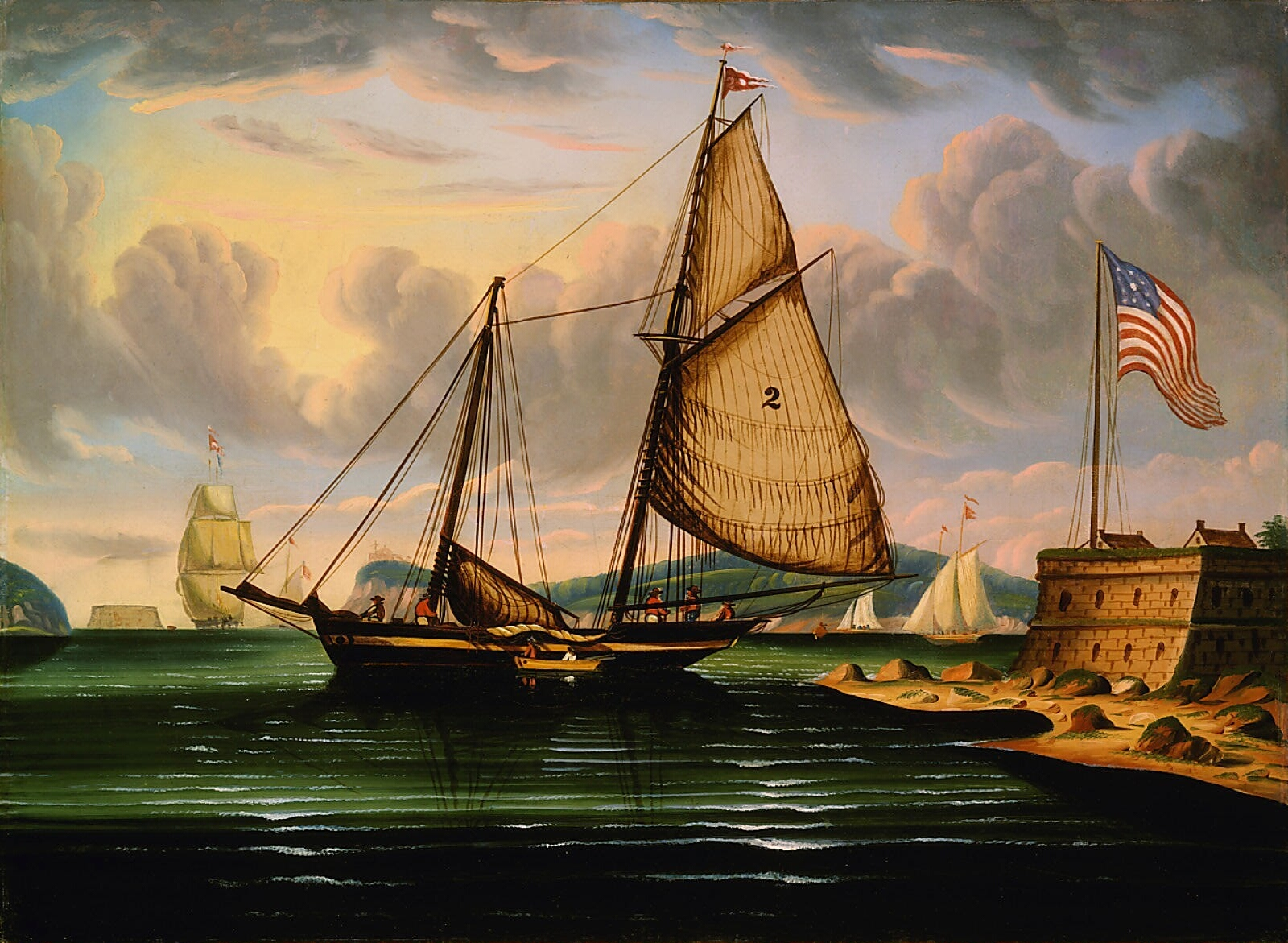
New York Harbor with Pilot Boat ‚George Washington

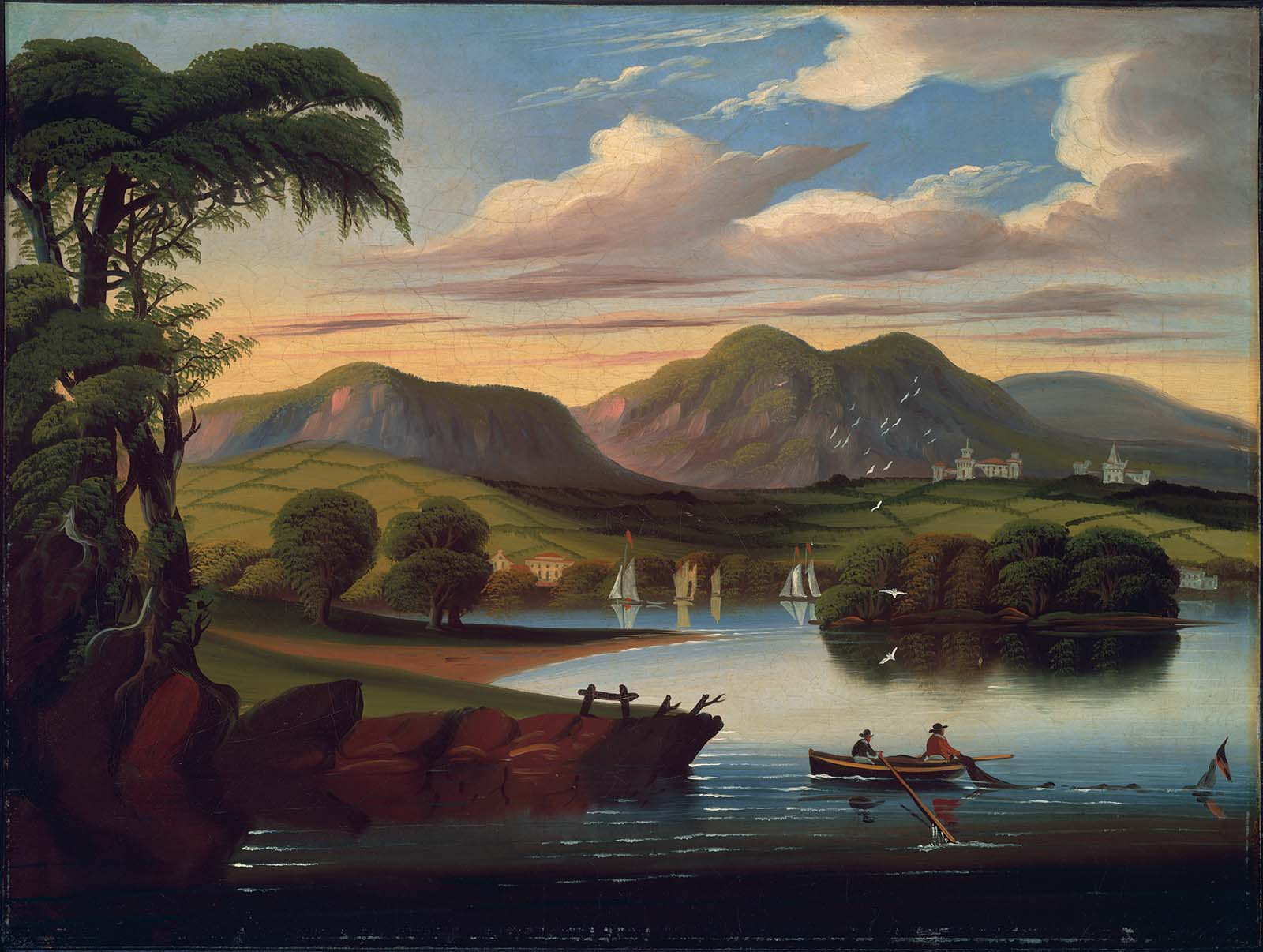
Summer, Fishermen Netting

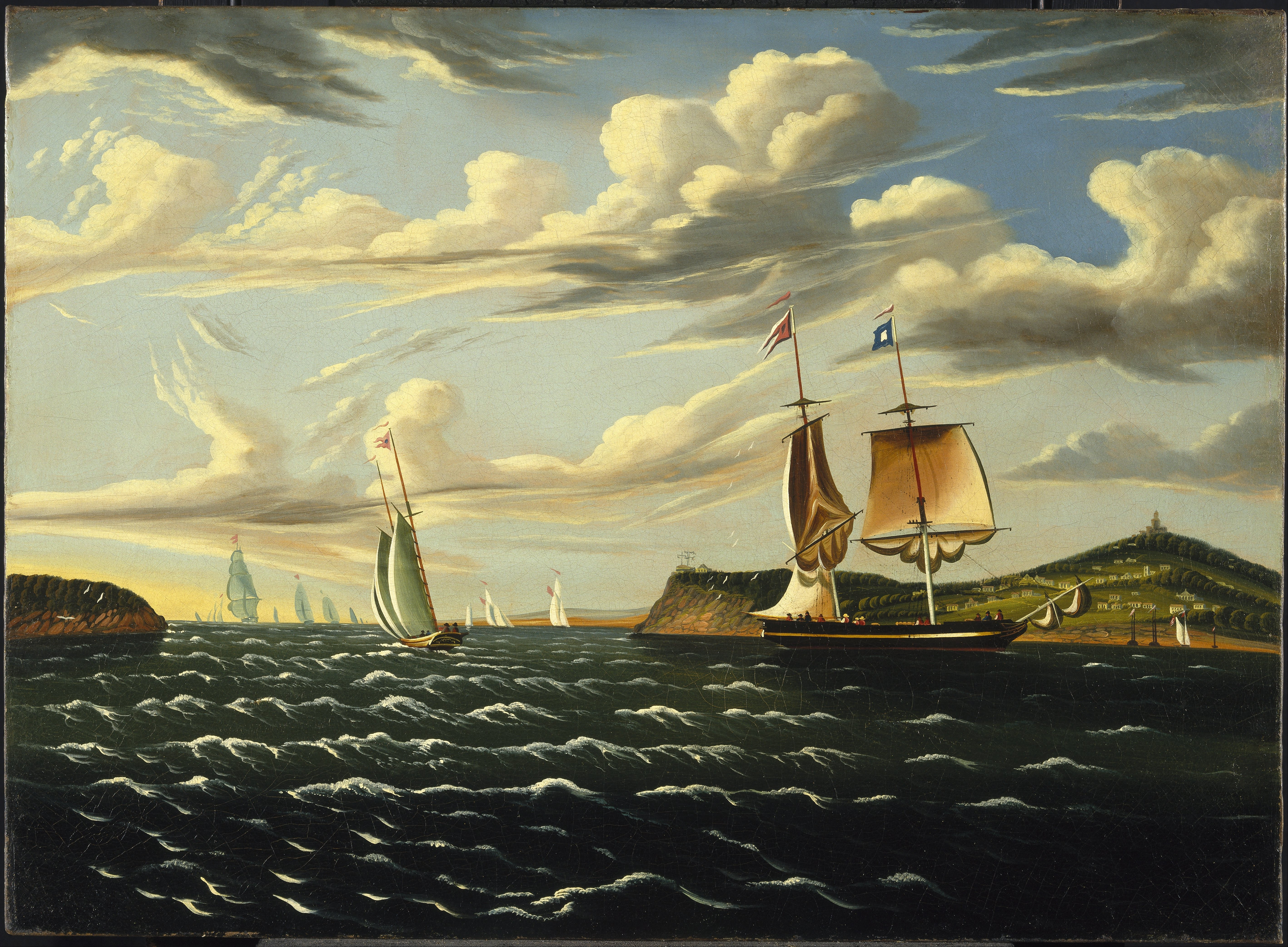
Staten Island and the Narrows

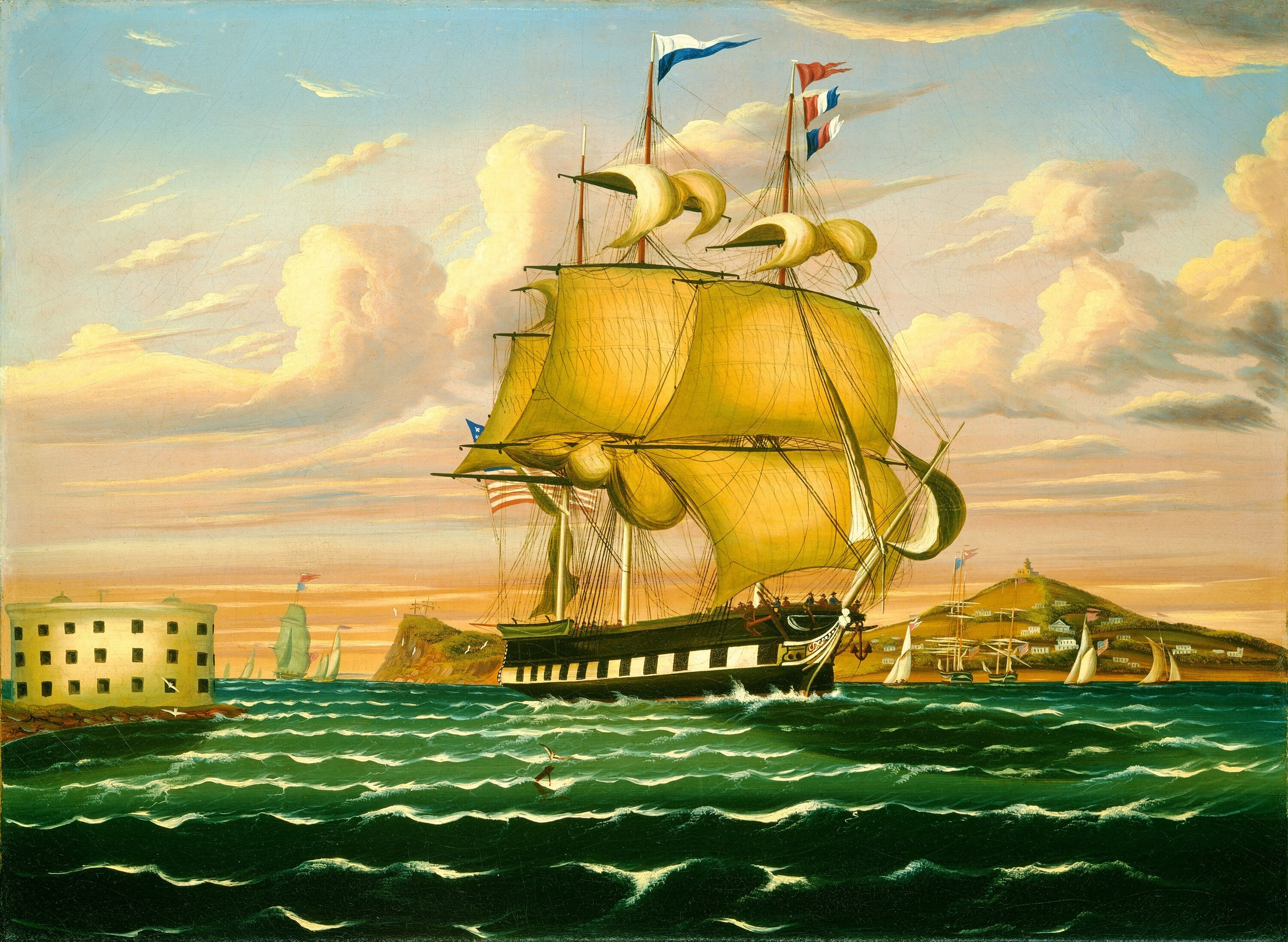
Packet Ship Passing Castle Williams, New York Harbor

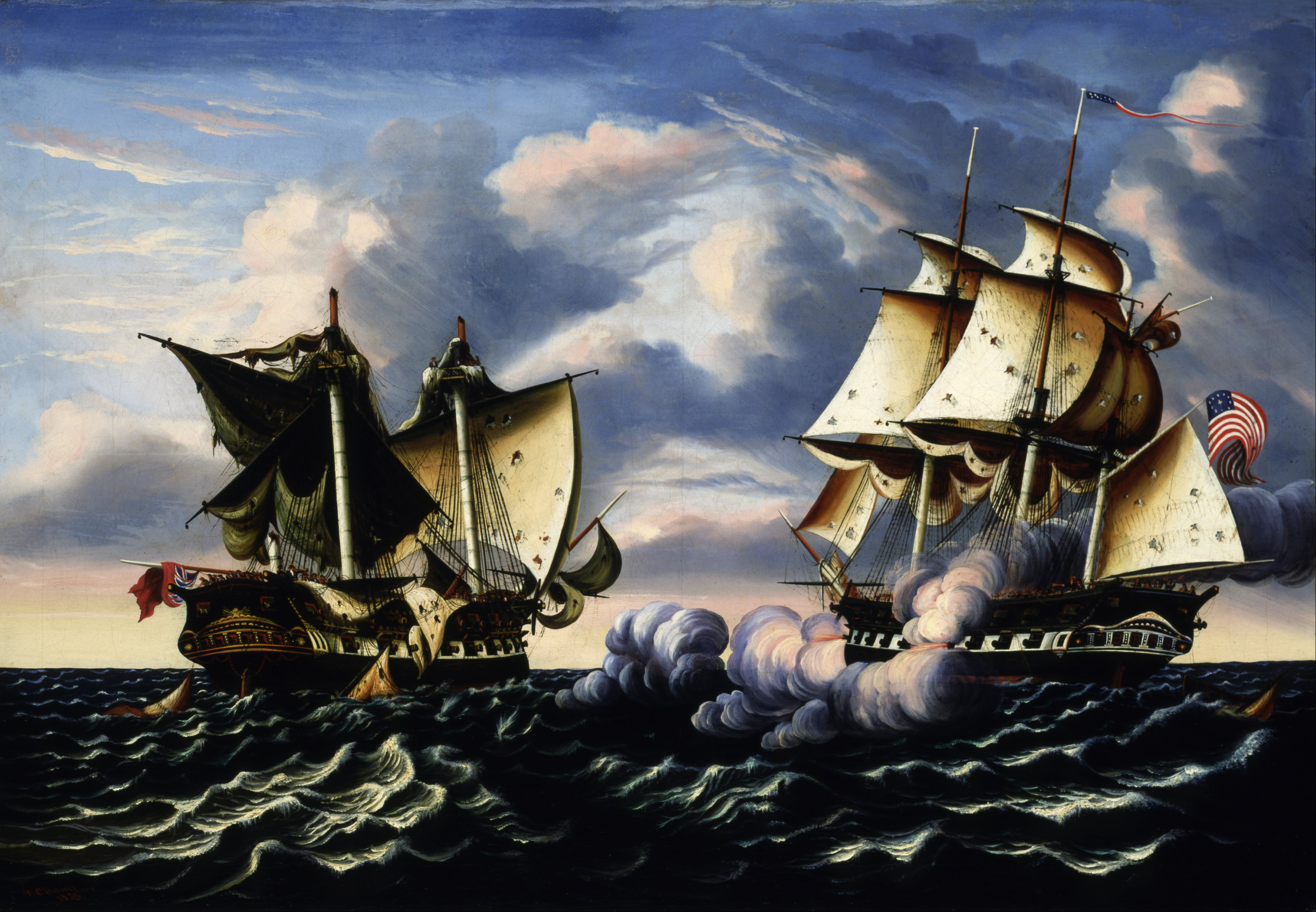
Capture of H.B.M. Frigate Macedonian by U.S. Frigate United States
