= Low Stakesby House =

House in Whitby, North Yorkshire, England

- Location within North Yorkshire
- Alternative names: Low Stakesby Mansion

General information
- Status: Converted into flats
- Location: Harrowing Drive, Whitby, North Yorkshire, England
- Coordinates: 54°29′03″N 0°37′39″W
- Year built: c. 1768
- Renovated: 1960s (converted)
- Client: Jonathan Scarth

Design and construction
- Architect: Thomas Scarth

Listed Building – Grade II*
- Official name: Low Stakesby Mansion
- Designated: 23 February 1954
- Reference no.: 1316349

Low Stakesby House, also known as Low Stakesby Mansion, is a historic building on Harrowing Drive in Whitby, a town in North Yorkshire, England.

The house was constructed in about 1768, by Thomas Scarth, for his brother, Jonathan. For much of the 19th century, it was owned by the Chapman family, then in the early 20th century by the Harrowing family. In the 1960s, it was converted into flats. It has been Grade II* listed since 1954.

The house is built of plum-coloured brick, with stone dressings, quoins, a cornice, a brick parapet and a pediment containing a coat of arms. There are two storeys, five bays, a central Venetian window and two pedimented dormers. On the right, at right angles, is a two-storey wing with seven bays, the middle three bays projecting under a pediment containing an oeil-de-boeuf. It has a pantile roof, a parapet and a central Diocletian window, and the other windows are sashes. At the rear are eight bays, with a balustrade, and an Ionic doorway with a pediment, and a doorway with a round fanlight. Inside, surviving original features include the staircase.

== See also ==
- Grade II* listed buildings in North Yorkshire (district)
- Listed buildings in Whitby (outer areas)
