= Ruswarp Hall =

Historic building in Ruswarp, North Yorkshire, England

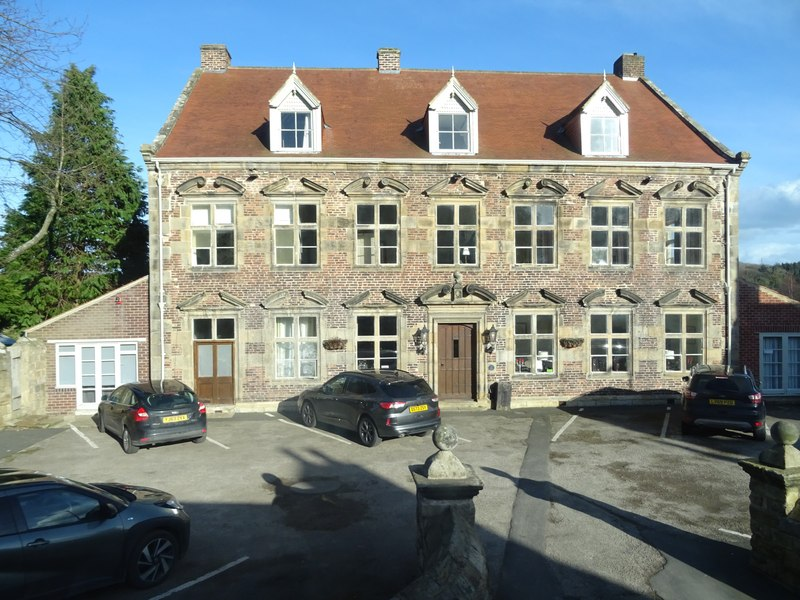
- The building in 2025

- Location within North Yorkshire

General information
- Location: High Street, Ruswarp, North Yorkshire, England
- Coordinates: 54°28′18″N 0°37′45″W
- Year built: Late 17th century
- Renovated: 20th century (extended)
- Owner: Historic Hotels & Properties

Website
- ruswarphall.com

Listed Building – Grade II*
- Official name: Ruswarp Hall
- Designated: 23 February 1954
- Reference no.: 1205169

Listed Building – Grade II*
- Official name: Garden wall and gate piers to Ruswarp Hall (Numbers 4 and 6)
- Designated: 4 December 1972
- Reference no.: 1148235

Ruswarp Hall is a historic building on High Street in Ruswarp, a village in North Yorkshire, England.

The country house was constructed in the late 17th century. In the 20th century, it was extended to both right and left. The building was Grade II* listed in 1954. By the 21st century, the building was operating as a ten-bedroom hotel. In 2024, it was purchased by the Historic Hotels & Properties group.

The house is built of brick with stone dressings, quoins, and a slate roof with capped gables. It has two storeys and attics, and is seven bays wide. The central doorway has a moulded surround, a double curved frieze, and a broken segmental pediment enclosing a square block with lozenge ornament and a ball finial. The windows are mullioned and transomed, with alternate broken triangular and segmental pediments. All the openings have quoined surrounds, and above are three gabled dormers with finials.

The front garden walls are in stone with stone gable topping. The gate piers are also in stone, and have a square section and are surmounted by ball finials. They are of the same date as the house, and are also Grade II* listed.

== See also ==
- Grade II* listed buildings in North Yorkshire (district)
- Listed buildings in Whitby (outer areas)
