= Mary Linskill =

English fiction writer and poet (1840–1891)

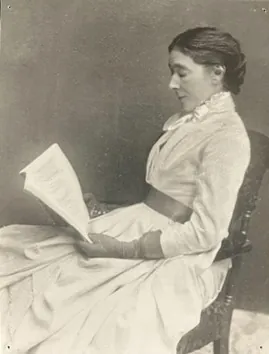
Linskill reading

Mary Linskill (13 December 1840 – 9 April 1891) was an English novelist, short-story writer and poet. She became especially popular in her native Yorkshire, whose landscape and scenery became a hallmark of her work.

== Childhood ==
Mary Linskill was born on 13 December 1840 in Whitby. She was the daughter of Mary Ann and Thomas Linskill. At the age of 11, Linskill's school education ended and she went to work for Charles James and learnt the millinery trade.

== Career ==
Mary Linskill moved with her mother into a small cottage near Newholme village. There she crafted many of her literary pieces. She went on to work in places such as Manchester and Newcastle, and later became qualified to become a schoolteacher in Hawksworth. She then served as a governess in Derby.

Many of Linskill's early writings, such as Tales of North Riding in 1871, appeared under the pseudonym "Stephen York" in Good Words magazine. Three of her major novels were Between the Heather and the Northern Sea (1884), The Haven under the Hill (1886) and In Exchange for a Soul (1887).

Having moved away from Whitby earlier in life, Linskill had to return on her father's death, as her siblings and mother were left impoverished. The turbulent and noisy life in Whitby posed a challenge to a writer who preferred a peaceful and solemn environment. However, the seaport had influences on her writings. In general, portrayal of Yorkshire landscape and scenery became a distinguishing mark of her works.

== Death ==
Linskill died on 9 April 1891 at the age of 50, at her Spring Vale home in Whitby. A monument in her honour stands in the parish churchyard and her remains are buried in Whitby Cemetery.

== Selected works ==
=== Novels ===
- Tales of North Riding, 1871. Bibliolife. ISBN 978-0559360077
- The Haven Under the Hill, 1886. RareBooksClub.com. ISBN 978-1231258736
- Cleveden, 1892. Caedmon of Whitby. ISBN 978-0905355146
- In Exchange for a Soul, 1887. Nabu Press. ISBN 978-1293047323

=== Short stories ===
- Raith Wyke, 1874
- Carl Forrest's Faith, 1883
- The Magic Flute, 1884
- A Lost Son, 1885
- The Glover's Daughter, 1885
- A Garden of Seven Lilies, 1886
- Hagar: A North Yorkshire Pastoral, 1887
- Robert Holt's Illusion, 1888
