= Sneaton =

Village and civil parish in North Yorkshire, England

Coordinates: 54.457500°N 0.622800°W

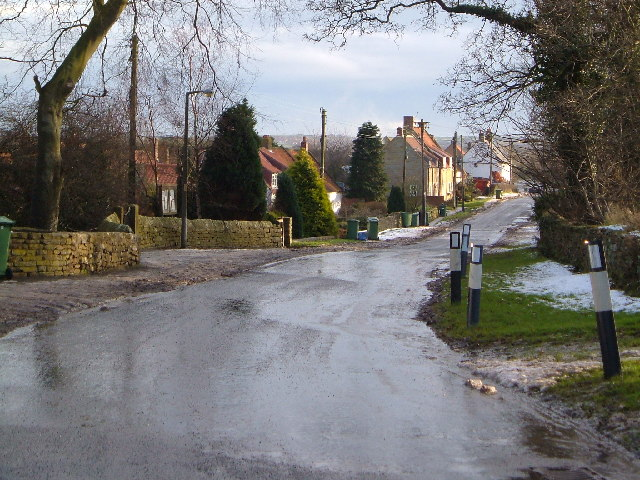

- Location within North Yorkshire
- Population: 178 (2011 census)
- OS grid reference: NZ893077
- Civil parish: Sneaton
- Unitary authority: North Yorkshire
- Ceremonial county: North Yorkshire
- Region: Yorkshire and the Humber
- Country: England
- Sovereign state: United Kingdom
- Post town: WHITBY
- Postcode district: YO22
- Police: North Yorkshire
- Fire: North Yorkshire
- Ambulance: Yorkshire
- UK Parliament: Scarborough and Whitby

Sneaton is a village and civil parish in the county of North Yorkshire, England. The Anglican St Hilda's Church, Sneaton lies in the village.

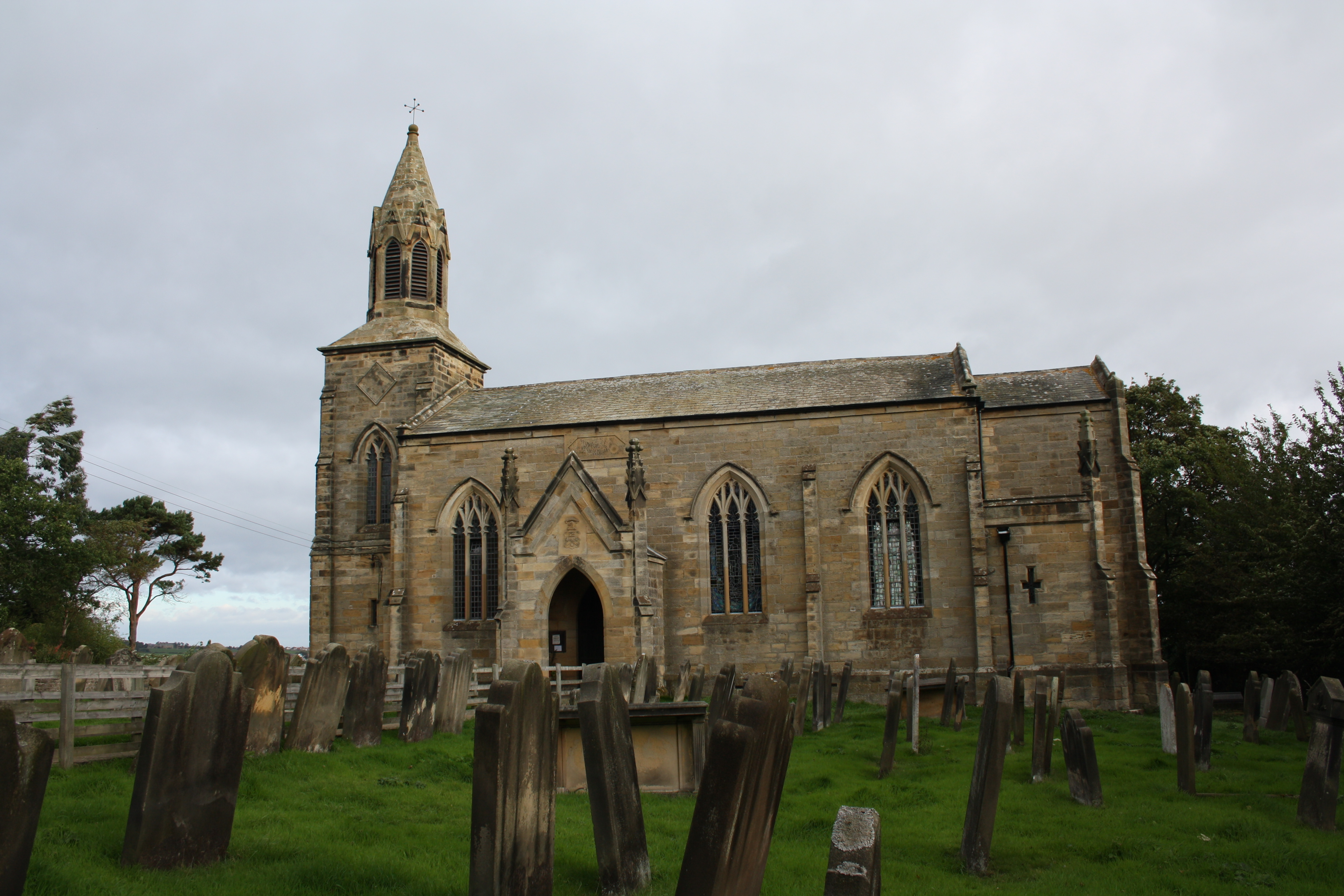
St Hilda's Church

According to the 2011 UK census, Sneaton parish had a population of 178, a decrease on the 2001 UK census figure of 190.

From 1974 to 2023 it was part of the Borough of Scarborough, it is now administered by the unitary North Yorkshire Council.

The name Sneaton possibly derives from the Old Norse personal name Snaer or Snjo, and the Old English tūn meaning 'settlement'. Alternatively, the first element may be derived from the Old English snǣd meaning 'a cut off piece of land'.

Two miles from the village on the outskirts of Whitby is the 19th century Sneaton Castle. The castle adjoins St. Hilda's Priory, the Mother Church of the Order of the Holy Paraclete.

== See also ==
- Listed buildings in Sneaton
