= Grosmont =

Grosmont may refer to:

- Grosmont, Monmouthshire, a village in Monmouthshire, Wales
  - Grosmont Castle, a ruined castle in Grosmont, Monmouthshire
- Grosmont, North Yorkshire, a small village and civil parish in the North York Moors, North Yorkshire, England
  - Grosmont Priory, a former monastery
  - Grosmont railway station
- Grosmont, Alberta, a hamlet in Alberta, Canada
  - Grosmont Formation, a stratigraphical unit in the Western Canadian Sedimentary Basin

== People ==
- Henry of Grosmont, Duke of Lancaster (c. 1310–1361), an English statesman, diplomat, soldier, and Christian writer, named for Grosmont Castle

== See also ==
- Grossmont (disambiguation)
