= Ruswarp =

Village in North Yorkshire, England

Coordinates: 54°28′12″N 0°37′44″W

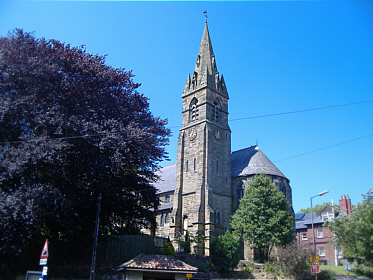
- St Bartholomew's Church

- Location within North Yorkshire
- OS grid reference: NZ885095
- Civil parish: Whitby
- Unitary authority: North Yorkshire
- Ceremonial county: North Yorkshire
- Region: Yorkshire and the Humber
- Country: England
- Sovereign state: United Kingdom
- Post town: WHITBY
- Postcode district: YO21
- Dialling code: 01947
- Police: North Yorkshire
- Fire: North Yorkshire
- Ambulance: Yorkshire
- UK Parliament: Scarborough and Whitby

Ruswarp (/ˈrʌsəp/ RUS-əp) is a village in the civil parish of Whitby, in North Yorkshire, England. It is around 1.8 miles (2.9 km) from Whitby, at the junction of the B1410 and B1416 roads, on the River Esk and the Esk Valley Line, with trains stopping at Ruswarp railway station. Originally it was called Risewarp (Old English hrīs wearp, c. 1146) meaning 'silted land overgrown with brushwood'.

The village is served by local shops including Jackson's of Ruswarp, and Colin Duck Grocer and Off-licence. There is a pub, the Bridge Inn, and the redundant St Bartholomew's Church, Ruswarp. Primary education is catered for by Ruswarp Church of England primary school. There was a Post Office on the high street which closed down several years ago after losing the franchise, and is now converted into a private residence.

The River Esk was used to power corn mills in the village but the last of these closed in 1962. The weir that was built to channel water into a mill race has been adapted to power a hydro-electric project on its southern bank. The Ruswarp Hydro project started generating electricity in December 2012.

The village also hosts one of the area's tourist attractions, Esk Leisure, which consists of Mini Monsterz Indoor Play with pottery painting and laser tag. Also at Esk Leisure is Outdoor Laser Combat and a Farm Park, previously a 9-hole Pitch and Putt course, which closed in October 2009. Opposite Esk Leisure is Ruswarp Pleasure Boats, established in 1874, where rowing boats or canoes can be rented to explore the sheltered waters that offer a unique opportunity to access the only migratory Salmon river in Yorkshire. There is also a miniature steam railway for children and adults.

Ruswarp Village Hall caters for community events and classes.

The local Church of England parish is Whitby with Ruswarp, which falls within the boundaries of the Diocese of York and is overseen by the suffragan Bishop of Whitby.

== Governance ==
Ruswarp was formerly a township in the parish of Whitby, in 1866 Ruswarp became a separate civil parish, on 1 April 1925 the parish was abolished and merged with Whitby. In 1921 the parish had a population of 6195. Until 1974 it was in the North Riding of Yorkshire. From 1974 to 2023 it was part of the Borough of Scarborough. It is now administered by the unitary North Yorkshire Council.

== Access ==
Northern Trains provide rail services, and bus services connect the village to the surrounding area. Crossing the River Esk downstream is a railway viaduct, 120 feet high, built (using 5,250,000 bricks) to carry the Scarborough-to-Whitby line, which closed in 1965. The viaduct is now owned by Sustrans and carries "The Cinder Track", a footpath/cyclepath along the former Whitby-to-Scarborough railway line.

The village lies on the Esk Valley Walk, a national long-distance footpath. There is a physically undemanding walk between Ruswarp and Whitby (approximately 1½ miles) mostly along a stone pannierway known as Monks Trod, signposted from the main street in Ruswarp.

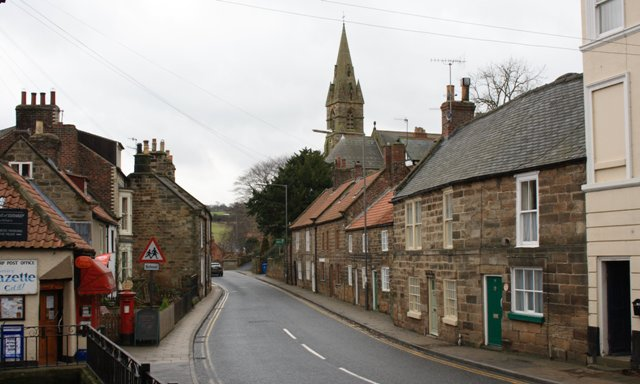
High Street

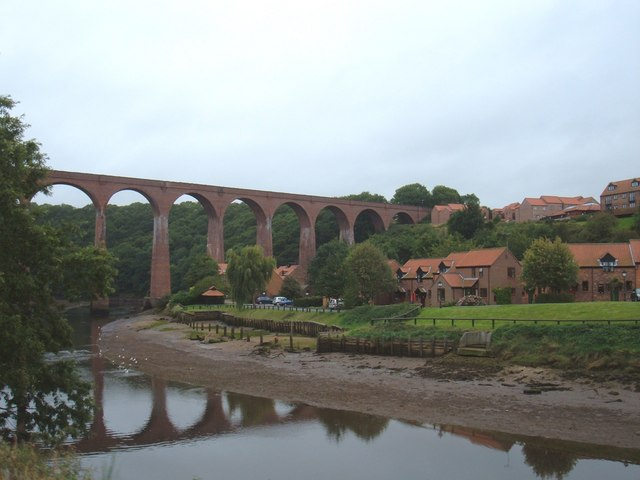
Former rail viaduct

== See also ==
- Listed buildings in Whitby (outer areas)
