= Streoneshalh =

Streoneshalh, or Streonshalh, may refer to:

- an archaic name for the harbour town of Whitby, in the English county of North Yorkshire
- the name of the original Anglo-Saxon foundation of Whitby Abbey, in the town of Whitby
- Whitby Streonshalh electoral division, representing part of the town of Whitby on the North Yorkshire Council
