= Middle Earth Tavern =

Pub in Whitby, North Yorkshire, England

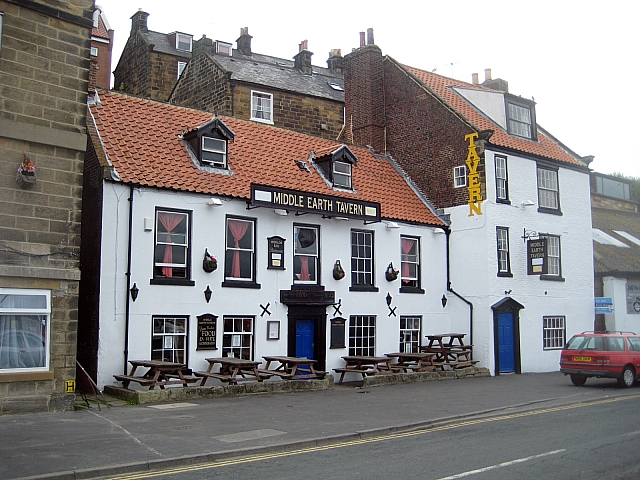
- The pub in 2009

- Location within North Yorkshire

General information
- Location: Church Street, Whitby, North Yorkshire, England
- Coordinates: 54°29′02″N 0°36′34″W
- Year built: 17th century
- Renovated: 19th century (extended)

Listed Building – Grade II
- Official name: 26, Church Street
- Designated: 4 December 1972
- Reference no.: 1148333

The Middle Earth Tavern is a historic pub on Church Street in Whitby, a town in North Yorkshire, England.

The building was constructed in the 17th century, and extended to the right in the 19th century. At some point it was converted into a pub, and named for J. R. R. Tolkien's Middle Earth, perhaps in reference to Tolkien having sketched nearby Whitby Abbey while a student. The building was Grade II listed in 1972. While it became vacant in the early 21st century, it was reopened as a restaurant and bar. Following flooding, the internal ground floor walls were left as bare brick, but contained assorted bric a brac and various references to Tolkien's work.

The pub is rendered and has a pantile roof. There are two storeys and attics, and five bays. The central doorway has pilasters, a frieze and a cornice. The windows are double-hung sashes in architraves and there are two gabled dormers with bargeboards and finials. Inside, it has a lounge and pool room.

== See also ==
- Listed buildings in Whitby (central area - east)
