= Black Horse, Whitby =

Pub in North Yorkshire, England

Black Horse
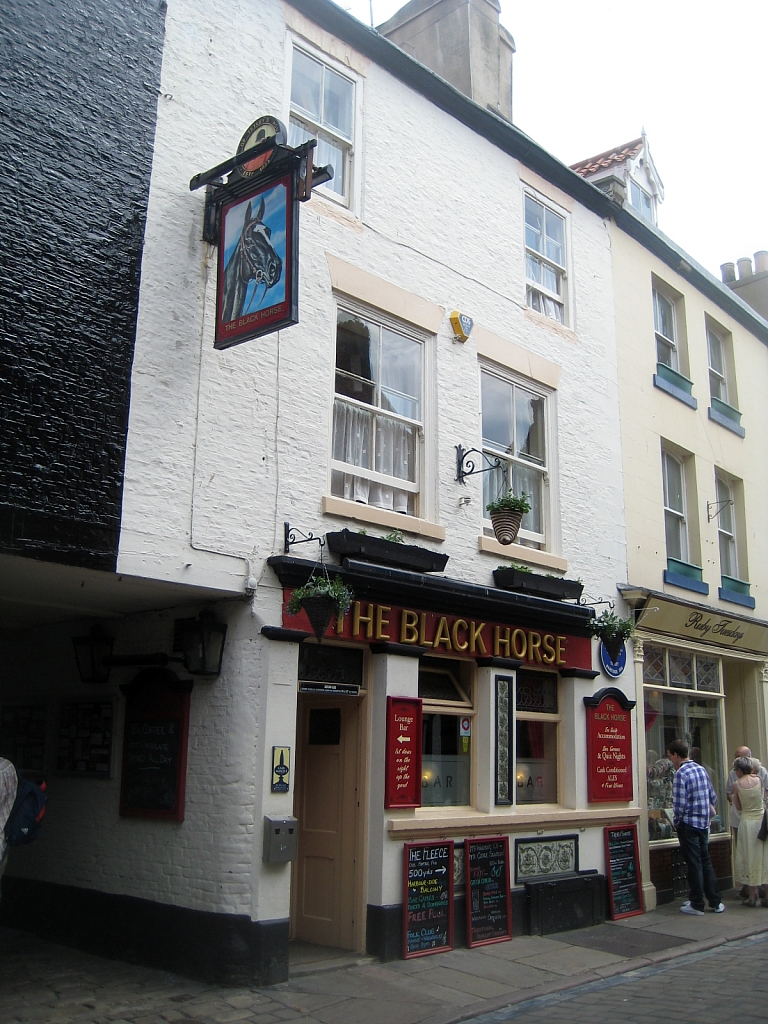
- The pub in 2011

- Location within North Yorkshire
- Former names: White Horse

General information
- Location: Church Street, Whitby, North Yorkshire, England
- Coordinates: 54°29′16″N 0°36′43″W
- Year built: 18th century

Website
- the-black-horse.com

Listed Building – Grade II
- Official name: No 91, the Black Horse public house and No 92
- Designated: 4 December 1972
- Reference no.: 1148300

The Black Horse is a historic pub on Church Street in Whitby, a town in North Yorkshire, England.

The pub and neighbouring shop were built in the 18th century. The rear yard is on the site of the kitchen midden of the abbey founded by Hilda of Whitby. The pub was originally named "The White Horse", but was required to change to its present name in 1828. The public serving bar was installed in the 1870s, shortly after its invention. The pub and shop were jointly Grade II listed in 1972. The pub was named the Whitby Gazette town pub of the year in 2014, and has regularly featured in the Good Beer Guide since 2007.

The pub and the shop to the right are built of painted brick, with three storeys and four bays. On the left is a flat carriage arch, and the public house has a plinth, two windows in a rendered architrave with four pilasters, and to the left is a doorway. Above is a fascia with the name. The shop has an early 20th-century shopfront with elaborate foliated consoles, a recessed door to the right with a blocked fanlight, and rendered stall risers. On the upper floors are sash windows with flush frames.

== See also ==
- Listed buildings in Whitby (central area - east)
