= Listed buildings in Whitby (central area - east) =

Whitby is a civil parish in the county of North Yorkshire, England. It contains over 470 listed buildings that are recorded in the National Heritage List for England. Of these, nine are listed at Grade I, the highest of the three grades, 25 at Grade II*, the middle grade, and the others are at Grade II, the lowest grade. The parish contains the town of Whitby and the surrounding area, including the village of Ruswarp and the smaller settlement of Ewe Cote.

Whitby has long connections with Christianity since the Synod of Whitby in 664, and the listed buildings most strongly representing this are Whitby Abbey and St Mary's Church, both listed at Grade I. These are both on the east side of the River Esk, where the town first mainly developed largely due to is harbour, the fishing industry and ship building. Most of the listed buildings in this area of the town are houses and cottages, and shops and cafés serving the current tourist industry, many of them crowded closely together due to the limited space available. The town developed on the west side of the town following the arrival of the railway in the 1840s, leading to the growth of the tourist industry here. In addition to hotels, restaurants and shops, many fine houses were built, together with churches and chapels, banks and public buildings.

This list contains the listed buildings in the central part of the town on the east side of the River Esk. Those in the other areas can be found at:

- Listed buildings in Whitby (central area - west)
- Listed buildings in Whitby (outer areas)

== Key ==
Grade	Criteria
I	Buildings of exceptional interest, sometimes considered to be internationally important
II*	Particularly important buildings of more than special interest
II	Buildings of national importance and special interest

== Buildings ==
Name and location	Photograph	Date	Notes	Grade
St Mary's Church; 54.48895°N 0.60996°W		c. 1110	The church has been altered and extended through the centuries, including a restoration in 1905 by W. D. Caröe. It is built in stone, and consists of a nave, a south porch, a north aisle, north and south transepts, a chancel and a west tower. The tower is squat, with three stages, clasping buttresses, string courses, slightly pointed bell openings with clock faces, and an embattled parapet. There is also an embattled parapet over most of the body of the church. The south doorway is Norman, with two orders of shafts and spiral volute capitals. Inside the church are box pews and a three-decker pulpit.	I
Garden walls and gatepiers, The Abbey House; 54.48858°N 0.60875°W		12th century	At the entrance to the grounds of the house is a pair of 17th-century stone gate piers, one with a griffin crest. The flanking walls are in stone and incorporate 12th and 13th-century carved stonework.	I
Whitby Abbey; 54.48837°N 0.60749°W		c. 1220	The abbey was rebuilt on a monastic site dating from the 7th century. It is now a ruin, but substantial remains have survived. There is a cruciform plan, consisting of a nave, a crossing with north and south transepts, a choir and a sanctuary.	I
East Pier; 54.49154°N 0.61078°W		Medieval	The pier is in stone and faces the West Pier. It was rebuilt in 1702 and extended in 1844–50.	II
Whitby Abbey Cross; 54.48902°N 0.60849°W		Medieval	The cross is in stone, and consists of a complete fluted shaft with a head, standing on a flight of steps.	I
The Church Stairs; 54.48871°N 0.61111°W		Before 1370	A flight of 199 stone steps leading up to St Mary's Church, parallel to part of Donkey Road, most dating from the 18th and 19th centuries.	I
159 and 160 Church Street; 54.48710°N 0.61173°W		Early to mid-15th century	Two shops, the right with a timber framed core, later encased and plastered, with a pantile roof, the right shop with a gabled front. Both shops have three storeys and one bay, the left shop lower and smaller, and the upper floor and gable of the right shop jettied. The right shop has a shopfront with pilasters, and above are sash windows with mullions. The left shop has a shop window and a doorway to the right, and a window in each upper floor.	II
9 and 10 Sandgate; 54.48774°N 0.61269°W	—	16th century (probable)	Two shops in stone, brick and timber framing, now rendered, with a steep-pitched pantile roof. There are two storeys and attics. The left shop has a 19th century and a modern shopfront, and the right shop has a small shop window and a plain doorway. Above are two sash windows and a sloping dormer.	II
The Abbey House; 54.48743°N 0.60859°W		16th century	The house has been altered and extended through the centuries. It is in stone, the main part has three storeys and attics, a cornice and a parapet. The right wing projects at right angles, and has three storeys. Some windows are sashes and others are mullioned, all with a variety of surrounds. The south front has two storeys, eleven bays, and flanking quoins. The central bay projects slightly and contains a doorway with an eared architrave and Ionic columns. Above is a frieze and a cornice, and a window with an architrave flanked by Corinthian columns, over which is a broken pediment with foliage and swags. The other windows have architraves and cornices.	I
3 and 4 White Cottages; 54.48290°N 0.60901°W	—	1595	The cottages are rough rendered, and have pantile roofs with stone kneelers and gable ends. There are two storeys and two bays. The doorway has a small sloped hood on consoles. The windows vary, some are modern and others are sashes, one horizontally sliding.	II
Tate Hill Pier; 54.48937°N 0.61256°W		1632	The pier replaced a medieval pier, and was extended in about 1765. It was formerly known as Burgess Pier.	II
7 Benson's Yard; 54.48862°N 0.61169°W	—	1639	The house is in brick and has a pantile roof, one storey and an attic. The door is modern and has a sloped hood on brackets. The windows are modern, and there is a sloped dormer.	II
26 Church Street; 54.48388°N 0.60952°W		17th century	The public house is rendered and has a pantile roof. There are two storeys and attics, and five bays. The central doorway has pilasters, a frieze and a cornice. The windows are double-hung sashes in architraves and there are two gabled dormers with bargeboards and finials.	II
84 Church Street; 54.48736°N 0.61172°W		17th century	The shop is rendered, and has a cornice between the storeys, a coved eaves cornice and a pantile roof. There are two storeys and attics, and four bays. On the ground floor is a shopfront and a passage doorway on the left. The upper floor contains three sash windows and a small window on the right, and above are two sloped dormers. The rear is gabled, and contains mullioned and modern windows.	II
123 Church Street; 54.48897°N 0.61192°W		17th century	The house is rendered and has a pantile roof. There are two storeys and an attic, and two bays, with the gable end facing the street. On the ground floor is a doorway with a hood on brackets, and the windows are sashes.	II
148 and 149 Church Street; 54.48773°N 0.61216°W		17th century	The building, which possibly incorporates earlier material, was later refaced on the front with Ruabon brick. The right return is partly rendered, the roof is in pantile, and the coped gable end faces the street. There are three storeys and an attic, and four bays. On the ground floor are 19th-century shopfronts, and above are sash windows with segmental heads.	II
162 and 162A Church Street; 54.48696°N 0.61160°W		17th century	A pair of cottages with a timber framed core, later encased and plastered, with a wooden eaves cornice, and a pantile roof. There are two storeys, the upper storey jettied, and four bays. On the left is a modern door in a four-centred arched architrave, to the right are two windows, one bowed and a Dutch door. The upper floor contains four windows, and there is a sloped dormer.	II
163 Church Street; 54.48691°N 0.61154°W		17th century	A cottage with a timber framed core, later encased and rendered, with a pantile roof. There are two storeys, the upper storey jettied, and two bays. The ground floor has a doorway flanked by windows, the left bowed. On the upper floor are double-hung sash windows, and above is a later flat-topped dormer.	II
164 Church Street; 54.48686°N 0.61150°W		17th century	A cottage with a timber framed core, later encased and rendered, with a boxed eaves cornice and a pantile roof. There are two storeys, the upper storey jettied, and two bays. The ground floor has a modern door flanked by modern windows, and on the upper floor are four-light casement windows.	II
1 and 2 Forester Court; 54.48748°N 0.61169°W		17th century	A pair of houses in stone, the upper part was added in the 18th century and the upper two storeys are rendered. There are three storeys and five bays. The two doorways have rectangular fanlights, the windows are a mix of sashes, some horizontally sliding, and modern casements. There are three windows on the top floor and five on the middle floor.	II
3 Forester Court; 54.48750°N 0.61161°W	—	17th century	The house is in stone, rendered on the ground floor, and it has a pantile roof with stone kneelers. There are two storeys and attics, and two bays. On the front is a doorway, and most of the windows are double-hung sashes.	II
11 Grape Lane; 54.48684°N 0.61153°W		17th century	The shop is plastered and has a pantile roof. There are two storeys and attics, and two bays. On the ground floor is a bowed Georgian shopfront and a central doorway with a fanlight, and there is another doorway to the right. The upper floor has a bow window on the left, and a three-light double-hung sash window with mullions to the right, and above is a dormer.	II
6 and 7 Market Place; 54.48779°N 0.61226°W		17th century	The shop is rendered, and has chamfered quoins. There are three storeys, the upper two overhanging, and two bays on Church Street. On the ground floor are doorways with rectangular fanlights and shop windows. The upper floors contain sash windows, some horizontally sliding.	II
1 and 2 White Cottages; 54.48284°N 0.60902°W	—	17th century (or earlier)	The cottages are rendered, with repairs in brick, and have a steeply pitched pantile roof, and one storey. Most of the windows are modern, and there are exposed timbers in the gable end of the left cottage.	II
The Silver Grid; 54.48794°N 0.61239°W		17th century	The building is timber framed and plastered, and has a modillion eaves cornice, and a pantile roof. There are two storeys, the upper storey jettied, and attics, and three bays. The ground floor has a modern shopfront, and the windows are double-hung sashes in architraves. There are two sloped dormers.	II
Abbey Stables; 54.48826°N 0.60953°W		17th century	The building is in stone with a moulded cornice and a pantile roof. There is one storey and attics. On the front is a plain modern door with side lights, the windows are mullioned, and above is a range of modern dormers.	I
The Garden Wall, New Gardens; 54.48103°N 0.59881°W		1652	The garden wall is in stone and brick. On the wall is a plaque with the date and an inscription, and a shield of arms with another inscription.	II
20 and 21 Grape Lane; 54.48685°N 0.61227°W		1669	A pair of shops in painted brick, with rusticated quoins, an eaves cornice and a pantile roof. There are two storeys and four bays. On the ground floor is a double Georgian shopfront, and paired doorways in the centre with rectangular fanlights. To the left is a doorway with a blank radiating fanlight, and an open dentilled pediment. The upper floor contains double-hung sash windows.	II
1, 2 and 2A Lockey's Yard; 54.48676°N 0.61238°W	—	1669	Three buildings at the rear of 20 and 21 Grape Lane, with pantile roofs and two storeys. No 1 is in brick and has a doorway with wooden pilasters. No 2 is rendered and has an attic, a doorway, a window, and a sloped dormer. No 2A is taller, and has a doorway and modern windows on the ground floor, above is a small window and a horizontally sliding sash window, and a large sloping dormer.	II
19 and 20 Church Street; 54.48330°N 0.60956°W		Late 17th century	A pair of cottages in painted brick, with rusticated quoins, a floor band and a pantile roof. There are two storeys and four bays. There are two storeys and attics, and four bays. The left doorway has a blocked fanlight and an open pediment and the right doorway is plain. Some windows are double-hung sashes, and others are fixed with one opening light.	II
Captain Cook's House; 54.48677°N 0.61184°W		1688	The house, later a museum, is in painted brick, and has a diagonal brick eaves cornice, and three storeys. The doorway on the left has an ogee-shaped head, panelled pilasters and a semicircular ornamental fanlight, and to the right is an inset foot scraper. Above the doorway are two small oval windows, and the other windows are paired double-hung sashes with flush surrounds.	I
7 and 8 Grape Lane; 54.48685°N 0.61198°W		Late 17th or early 18th century	A pair of plastered shops with a pantile roof. There are two storeys and two bays. The ground floor contains two Georgian shopfronts with bow windows and central doorways, and between them is another doorway. On the upper floor are three-light sash windows with mullions, and above are two sloped dormers.	II
Black Bull House; 54.48797°N 0.61222°W		1704 (or earlier)	The building is on a corner site, it is rendered and has a pantile roof. The Church Street front is gabled, and has three storeys and one bay. On the ground floor is a bow window, and above are two sash windows, the one on the middle floor horizontally sliding. The Market Street front has two storeys, the upper floor is jettied, and it contains a doorway, sash windows and a sloped dormer.	II
21 and 22 Church Street; 54.48340°N 0.60954°W		Early 18th century	A pair of cottages in stone with a pantile roof. There are two storeys and attics, and three bays. On the front are three doorways, and the windows are a mix of double-hung sashes and modern casements.	II
7 Sandgate; 54.48761°N 0.61266°W	—	Early 18th century	A shop in rendered brick with a pantile roof. There are two storeys and an attic, and two bays. On the ground floor is an early 19th-century shopfront with pilasters, a frieze and a cornice, and a doorway with a lion knocker and an ornamental fanlight. The upper floor contains double-hung sash windows in architraves, and above is a flat-topped dormer with a casement.	II
Morland Cottage; 54.48940°N 0.61094°W		Early 18th century	A pair of rendered houses with a floor band, a pantile roof, two storeys and attics. On the front are two doorways, the left with a round head, the windows are a mix of sashes and modern windows, and there is a sloped dormer.	II
1–5 Arguments Yard; 54.48832°N 0.61252°W	—	18th century	A row of five houses, one rendered, the others in stone. There are two storeys and each house has one bay. The doors are plain, and the windows are double-hung sash windows, some horizontally-sliding.	II
3 Benson's Yard; 54.48856°N 0.61192°W	—	18th century	The house is rendered and has a pantile roof. There are two storeys, and it contains a modern door and modern windows.	II
5 and 6 Benson's Yard; 54.48861°N 0.61180°W	—	18th century	A pair of houses in brick, partly rendered, with a pantile roof. There are two storeys and each house has two bays. The left house has double-hung sash windows on the upper floor, and windows with fixed lights and one opening section below. On the ground floor of the right house is a doorway with a sloped hood on consoles, and the windows have 19th-century glazing.	II
1 and 2 Blackburn's Yard; 54.48810°N 0.61192°W	—	18th century	A pair of rendered houses with a pantile roof. There are three storeys and each house has two bays. On the ground floor are two doorways and 19th-century windows, and above are sash windows in moulded flush frames.	II
3 and 4 Blackburn's Yard; 54.48813°N 0.61180°W	—	18th century	A pair of rendered houses with a pantile roof. There are three storeys and attics, and each house has one bay. The basement has a window and a door, and there is a doorway on the middle floor. The windows have moulded frames, and there are two sloped dormers.	II
5 and 6 Blackburn's Yard; 54.48816°N 0.61164°W	—	18th century	A pair of rendered houses with a pantile roof. There are three storeys and attics, and each house has one bay. The doorways have plain surrounds, most of the windows are modern, and there are two small sloped dormers.	II
7 Blackburn's Yard; 54.48818°N 0.61157°W	—	18th century	The house is in brick, the ground floor is rendered, and it has a pantile roof. There are three storeys and three bays. Steps and a bridge lead to the doorway on the middle floor. The windows are sashes, and the openings on the middle floor have elliptical reveals.	II
20–22 Blackburn's Yard; 54.48835°N 0.61162°W	—	18th century	A row of three houses in brick with a pantile roof. There are two storeys and attics, and each house has one bay. Two houses have doorways with plain sloped hoods, and fixed windows with one opening light, and the other has a modern door and windows.	II
1 Borough Place; 54.48809°N 0.61178°W	—	18th century	The house is rendered, with a pantile roof and has two storeys. It contains a plain door and modern windows.	II
2 Borough Place; 54.48809°N 0.61173°W	—	18th century	The house is rendered, with a pantile roof and has two storeys. It contains a modern door and a modern window in each floor.	II
3 and 4 Borough Place; 54.48810°N 0.61166°W	—	18th century	The houses are in brick with a pantile roof, three storeys and two bays. On the ground floor is a doorway, and steps lead up to a modern door on the middle floor. Most of the windows are double-hung sashes with flat stone arches.	II
5 Borough Place; 54.48812°N 0.61157°W	—	18th century	The house is in brick with a pantile roof. There are two storeys and a basement, and two bays. The doorway has a four-light rectangular fanlight, and the windows are double-hung sashes in moulded frames. The ground floor openings have stone arches.	II
6–8 Borough Place; 54.48813°N 0.61145°W	—	18th century	Three houses in stone with a pantile roof and stone kneelers. There are three storeys and three bays. The ground floor has three doorways with blocked four-light rectangular fanlights, on the middle floor are double-hung sash windows, and the top floor has horizontally sliding sashes.	II
9 and 10 Borough Place; 54.48816°N 0.61133°W	—	18th century	Two houses in brick with a pantile roof, three storeys and two bays. The doorways are modern, and the windows are sashes in moulded frames.	II
11 Borough Place; 54.48818°N 0.61124°W	—	18th century	The house is in brick with a pantile roof, three storeys and two bays. The door and windows are modern, the windows with moulded frames.	II
1 and 2 Bridge Street and 1–3 Sandgate; 54.48726°N 0.61274°W	—	18th century	The shop on a corner site is in painted stone and has sill bands, a cornice and a parapet. There are three storeys and seven bays. On the ground floor are a modern shopfront on the left, a round-arched doorway with a rusticated surround, and a doorway with a rectangular fanlight. The upper floors contain sash windows.	II
1 Church Lane; 54.48887°N 0.61146°W	—	18th century	The house is rendered and has a hipped slate roof. There are two storeys and fronts of one bay. On the ground floor is a doorway and a modern bow window, and on the upper floor is a casement window.	II
18 Church Street; 54.48323°N 0.60955°W	—	18th century	A brick house with a pantile roof, three storeys and an attic, and two bays. On the ground floor is a garage door, and a doorway under a segmental arch to the left. The upper floors contain canted bay windows, and there is a sloped dormer.	II
30 Church Street; 54.48408°N 0.60969°W		18th century	The house is in rendered brick with a pantile roof. There are two storeys and an attic, and two bays. The central door is modern, and to the right is a passage entry. The windows are horizontally sliding sashes, those on the upper floor have relieving elliptical arches, and those on the attic are half-dormers.	II
34 and 35 Church Street; 54.48431°N 0.60982°W		18th century	A house and a shop to the left, in brick with a pantile roof and one kneeler. There are three storeys and attics, and four bays. The shop has a modern shopfront, and the house has a doorway flanked by windows. The windows are sashes, and all the openings have flat stone arches. Above are two dormers, one sloped.	II
44 Church Street; 54.48503°N 0.61007°W		18th century	The house, at right angles to the street, is rendered and has a tile roof. There are three storeys and three bays. The doorway has a porch with a pediment, and the windows are sashes. Projecting towards the street is a two-storey two-bay extension containing a similar doorway on the upper floor approached by steps with railings.	II
45 and 46 Church Street; 54.48561°N 0.61038°W		18th century	A pair of stone houses, the upper part of the right house painted, with a pantile roof. There are three storeys and each house has one bay. The doorway has pilasters, a blocked radiating fanlight, and a moulded round-arched head, and on the left is a passage door. The windows are sashes, those on the left house tripartite.	II
51A Church Street; 54.48579°N 0.61046°W		18th century	The house has a stone base, the rest is roughcast, and it has a pantile roof with a Dutch gable facing the street. There are three storeys and one bay. Each floor contains a modern casement window.	II
59–61 Church Street; 54.48641°N 0.61086°W		18th century	A row of three cottages in painted brick with a Welsh slate roof. There are two storeys and attics, and each cottage has one bay. The ground floor contains three shopfronts. On the upper floor of the right cottage is a three-light canted oriel window, and the other cottages have casement windows. Above are three flat-roofed dormers.	II
85 Church Street; 54.48740°N 0.61173°W		18th century	The shop is rendered, and has a moulded eaves cornice] and a pantile roof. There are three storeys and two bays. On the ground floor is a 19th-century shopfront with pilasters and consoles, and above are sash windows.	II
89 and 90 Church Street; 54.48768°N 0.61193°W		18th century	Two rendered shops with a moulded coved eaves cornice and pantile roofs. There are three storeys and basement, the left shop has two bays and the right shop has three. The left shop has a late 19th-century shopfront with an entablature and a cornice, the right shop has a 19th-century shopfront a fascia and consoles, and between them is a segmental-arched passageway with a keystone. The upper floors in both shops contain sash windows, and one window on the right shop is blind.	II
93 and 94 Church Street; 54.48788°N 0.61196°W		18th century	A shop in brick, with rusticated quoins, a wooden eaves cornice and a pantile roof. There are three storeys and four bays. On the ground floor are two late 19th-century shopfronts with a fascia on consoles with lions' heads, and two doorways with rectangular fanlights, and to the right is a passage entry. The upper floors contain double-hung sash windows with stone heads.	II
95 Church Street; 54.48795°N 0.61202°W		18th century	The shop is in brick with a pantile roof. There are three storeys and attics, and two bays. On the ground floor is a 19th-century shopfront with plain pilasters, and a modern door with a rectangular fanlight. The upper floors have sash windows in moulded frames with stone arches, and to the left on the middle floor is a small window. On the attics are two flat-roofed dormers.	II
97 and 98 Church Street; 54.48807°N 0.61209°W		18th century	The building is in painted brick and has a stone-capped parapet. There are three storeys and four bays. On the ground floor are two late 19th century shopfronts, each with a fascia on consoles, and on the left is a passage entry. The upper floors contain pairs of slightly recessed casement windows under elliptical arches.	II
106 Church Street; 54.48851°N 0.61207°W		18th century	The shop is rendered and has a pantile roof. There are two storeys, attics and a basement, and two bays. On the ground floor is a modern bow window in a 19th-century shopfront, to the right is a doorway with a fanlight, a sash window, and a passage entry with a pointed head. The upper floors contain double-hung sash windows in moulded frames, and there are two gabled dormers.	II
107 Church Street; 54.48854°N 0.61206°W		18th century	The shop is in brick and has a pantile roof, three storeys and one bay. The ground floor contains a shopfront, and above are modern three-light windows, the window on the middle floor with a segmental head.	II
108 Church Street; 54.48857°N 0.61207°W		18th century	The shop is in rendered stone with a band and a pantile roof. There are two storeys and attics, and one bay. On the ground floor is a shop window with shutters, and to the right is a passage entry. The upper floor contains a sash window with a flush frame, and above is a dormer.	II
109 Church Street; 54.48865°N 0.61207°W		18th century	The house is rendered, and has a coved eaves cornice and a pantile roof. There are two storeys and an attic, and one bay. On the left is a doorway with reeded pilasters, a blocked radiating fanlight, and an open pediment on consoles. To the right is a sash window with a mullion, the upper floor contains a modern casement window and a small circular window to the right, and above is a sloped dormer.	II
110 Church Street; 54.48875°N 0.61208°W		18th century	The shop is in rendered brick with rusticated quoins and a pantile roof. There are two storeys and attics, and two bays. On the ground floor is a shopfront, the upper floor has sash windows, and above is a modern dormer.	II
111 Church Street; 54.48882°N 0.61205°W		18th century	A shop on a corner site, it is rendered and has a floor band and a slate roof. There are two storeys and attics, and two bays. The ground floor has a 19th-century shopfront with a fascia on consoles, and the left return contains a shop window. On the upper floor are sash windows with moulded frames, and above is a flat-roofed dormer.	II
113 Church Street; 54.48884°N 0.61197°W		18th century	The shop is rendered and has a pantile roof. There are three storeys and an attic, and one bay. On the ground floor is a shop window, and a doorway with a hood on brackets to the left. The upper floors contain sash windows in moulded frames, and above is a modern dormer.	II
114 Church Street; 54.48885°N 0.61191°W		18th century	The house is rendered, and has a coved eaves cornice and a pantile roof. There are three storeys and an attic, and one bay. On the ground floor is a doorway with a hood on brackets to the right, and above it is an inscribed and dated plaque. The windows are sashes in moulded frames, on the middle floor is a small single-light window on the right, and above is a flat-roofed dormer.	II
115 and 116 Church Street; 54.48888°N 0.61180°W		18th century	Two rendered houses with a pantile roof. There are three storeys and four bays. The doorways are paired; the right with a reeded surround and roundels, the left with a plain surround, and both under a cornice that continues over the window to the right. Above are three ammonites embedded in the wall. The windows are sashes.	II
119 and 120 Church Street; 54.48907°N 0.61180°W		18th century	A pair of rendered houses with a pantile roof. There are two storeys, attics and basements, and four bays. The doorways in the centre have plain surrounds, the windows are sashes, each pair with joined sills, and there are two gabled dormers with finials.	II
121 and 122 Church Street; 54.48901°N 0.61181°W		18th century	A house and a shop on a corner site, in rended brick, with a floor band and a pantile roof. There are two storeys and attics, and a basement to the shop, two bays on the front and one on the left return. On the front are two doorways with elliptical heads, the left with steps, the windows are sashes, and there are two sloped dormers.	II
123A Church Street; 54.48897°N 0.61202°W		18th century	The house is in brick, painted on the front, the basement is rendered, and it has a floor band and a pantile roof. There are two storeys, a basement and an attic, and three bays. Steps lead up to a doorway in the right bay that has a blank fanlight and an open pediment. The windows are sashes.	II
126 and 127 Church Street; 54.48881°N 0.61224°W		18th century	A house and a shop to the left, they are rendered, the shop has a modillion cornice, and they have a pantile roof. There are two storeys and attics, and four bays. The house has a plain doorway and two windows to its left. The shop has a doorway with a fanlight and an open pediment, and a shop window with a cornice to the right. The other windows are sashes in moulded frames, and on each part is a dormer.	II
128 and 129 Church Street; 54.48873°N 0.61225°W		18th century	A pair of rendered shops with a coved eaves cornice and a pantile roof. There are two storeys and attics, and two bays. The doorways are in the centre. The right shop has a shop window on the ground floor and a double-hung sash window above, and the left shop has a casement window on each floor. Both shops have a sloped dormer.	II
130 and 131 Church Street; 54.48865°N 0.61221°W		18th century	A pair of rendered houses with a pantile roof. There are two storeys and two bays. The doorways are paired in the centre, and the windows are double-hung sashes. On the right house is a tall dormer with a sash window.	II
132 and 133 Church Street; 54.48860°N 0.61221°W		18th century	A pair of rendered houses with a pantile roof. There are two storeys and attics, and two bays. The doorways are paired in the centre. The windows are double-hung sashes, and there are two dormers.	II
134 and 135 Church Street; 54.48856°N 0.61221°W		18th century	Two shops in stone, the right rendered, with a pantile roof. There are three storeys and three bays. On the front are three doorways with reeded surrounds, one with a divided fanlight, and two shop windows. The window in the top floor on the right has two lights and a mullion, and the others are double-hung sashes in moulded architraves.	II
137 and 138 Church Street; 54.48839°N 0.61227°W		18th century	A house and a shop in stone, the house on the right rendered, they have a coved eaves cornice and a pantile roof. There are two storeys, the shop with a basement, and two bays. The shop has a doorway with a rectangular fanlight, and a bow window to the right over a glazed basement window. The house has a modern doorway, the windows on both parts are modern casements, and on the house is a sloped dormer.	II
139 Church Street; 54.48833°N 0.61227°W		18th century	The shop is rendered, on a plinth, with rusticated quoins, a dentilled eaves cornice and a pantile roof. There are two storeys and an attic, and one bay. The doorway on the left has a rectangular fanlight, the windows are modern casements and there is a flat-topped dormer.	II
140 Church Street; 54.48830°N 0.61227°W		18th century	The house is rendered and has a pantile roof. There are two storeys and an attic, and one bay. The doorway is on the left, to its right is a bow window, the upper floor contains a modern window, and above is a sloped dormer with a horizontally sliding sash window.	II
141 Church Street; 54.48826°N 0.61228°W		18th century	The house is rendered and has a pantile roof. There are two storeys and an attic, and two bays. On the right is a passageway with steps, containing the entrance. The windows are double-hung sashes, and above is a sloped dormer.	II
143 and 144 Church Street; 54.48813°N 0.61225°W		18th century	A pair of houses in brick with a pantile roof. There are three storeys and basements, and two bays. The paired doorways are in the centre under a common flat stone arch. To the left is a two-light window with a mullion and a glazed basement window, and to the right is a canted bay window. The upper floors contain two-storey canted oriel windows.	II
145 Church Street; 54.48805°N 0.61225°W		18th century	The shop is in brick with a parapet and a pantile roof. There are three storeys and attics, and three bays. The ground floor contains a shopfront with pilasters, a fascia and a modillion cornice. On the upper floors are sash windows, and above is a sloped dormer.	II
146 Church Street; 54.48800°N 0.61223°W		18th century	A shop in painted brick, with an eaves cornice, and a pantile roof with stone capped gables and kneelers. There are three storeys and one bay. The ground floor contains a shopfront and a doorway to the left with a rectangular fanlight. The windows on the upper floors are three-light double-hung sashes, the window on the middle floor under a segmental arch.	II
150 and 151 Church Street; 54.48767°N 0.61211°W		18th century	Two shops in painted brick with a pantile roof. There are three storeys and two bays. The right shop has a late 19th-century shopfront with a tiled stall riser and a small plinth, and above is a single modern four-light casement window. The left shop has a lower 19th-century shopfront, and above is a double-hung sash window in an architrave on each floor.	II
153 and 154 Church Street; 54.48754°N 0.61202°W		18th century	A pair of shops in painted brick with a moulded eaves cornice and a pantile roof. There are three storeys and four bays. The ground floor contains two late 19th-century shopfronts with a cornice on decorative consoles, and to the left is a passage entry. The upper floors have double-hung sash windows with stone arches alternating with blocked windows.	II
155 Church Street; 54.48745°N 0.61198°W		18th century	The shop is in painted brick with a stone moulded cornice and a parapet. There are four storeys and two bays. The ground floor contains a double shopfront with two Ionic pilasters and rendered stall risers, and on the upper floor are sash windows with flat stone arches.	II
156 Church Street; 54.48743°N 0.61195°W		18th century	The shop is rendered and has a pantile roof. There are three storeys and two bays. On the ground floor is a shopfront with two doorways and a fascia on carved consoles, and the upper floors contain sash windows.	II
157 and former 158 Church Street; 54.48737°N 0.61191°W		18th century	A shop on a corner site in painted brick on the front, and in stone on the left return, it has a pantile roof with the remains of stone kneelers. There are two storeys and attics, and two bays on the front. The ground floor contains modern shopfronts, and above are double-hung sash windows with rendered flat brick arches, and two sloped dormers.	II
9 Clark's Yard, Church Street; 54.48751°N 0.61097°W	—	18th century	The house is in brick with a pantile roof, two storeys and attics, and two bays. On the front is a trellis porch, and a doorway with a cornice and a pedimented centre. The windows are a mix of sashes, casements and fixed-light windows, and there is a sloped dormer.	II
2 Ellerby Lane; 54.48746°N 0.61244°W	—	18th century	The house is rendered and has a pantile roof. There are two storeys, a basement and attics, and two bays. On the basement is a window, the ground floor has a doorway with a rectangular fanlight and a fixed window with one opening light, on the upper floor are two sash windows, and above is a dormer.	II
3 Ellerby Lane; 54.48748°N 0.61235°W	—	18th century	The house is rendered and has a pantile roof. There are two storeys and two bays. The ground floor has a doorway, a six-light 19th-century window and a foot scraper, and on the upper floor are two windows with 19th-century glazing.	II
4 and 5 Ellerby Lane; 54.48750°N 0.61221°W	—	18th century	The building has two storeys and a pantile roof. On the ground floor is a window with 19th-century glazing, and the upper floor has two double-hung sash windows.	II
6 and 7 Ellerby Lane; 54.48751°N 0.61215°W	—	18th century	The building is in stone, and has a pantile roof and three storeys. The windows are placed irregularly and have 19th-century glazing.	II
4 Forester Court; 54.48752°N 0.61153°W	—	18th century	The house is in brick and has a pantile roof. There are two storeys and two bays. On the front are two doorways with rectangular fanlights, and the windows are double-hung sashes. All the openings have stone arches.	II
5 and 6 Forester Court; 54.48757°N 0.61131°W	—	18th century	A pair of houses in brick with a pantile roof. There are three storeys and three bays. The doorway to the left house is on the ground floor, and the right house has a doorway on the middle floor, with a rectangular fanlight, approached by a flight of external steps. The windows are sashes with flush frames and stone arches.	II
9, 10 and 10A Grape Lane; 54.48682°N 0.61174°W		18th century	A shop with living accommodation above in rendered brick. There are three storeys and four bays. On the ground floor is a modern shopfront, and to the left is a doorway with grooved pilasters and a modern architrave. The upper floors contain modern windows, and there are two dormers.	II
19 Grape Lane; 54.48680°N 0.61213°W		Mid-18th century (probable)	The house has a ground floor in rusticated stone, and above it is in brick and surrounded by fluted ionic pilasters and an entablature. There are four storeys and a basement, and three bays. On the ground floor are three double-hung sash windows with triple keystones, and these are flanked by round-arched doorways with blank radiating spiked fanlights. The upper floors have sash windows with sill bands, a cornice, a parapet with open panels, and an octagonal lantern. At the rear is a doorway with an ornamental semicircular fanlight, a tall bottle window, and sash windows.	II*
4 Henrietta Street; 54.48913°N 0.61132°W		Mid-18th century	The house is rendered and has a rendered floor band and a pantile roof. There are two storeys and three bays. The doorway is modern, the windows are sashes in architraves, and above there is a dormer.	II
6–10 Henrietta Street; 54.48921°N 0.61112°W		Mid-18th century	A row of houses in painted brick with a floor band and a pantile roof. There are two storeys and attics, and ten bays. The doorways have rectangular fanlights, some windows are blocked, and the others are double-hung sashes in architraves, and above are dormers.	II
12 and 14 Henrietta Street; 54.48930°N 0.61092°W		Mid-18th century	A pair of houses, the left rendered and the right in brick, with a floor band and a pantile roof. There are two storeys and three bays, and between the houses in a stone arch. Each house has paired windows, and the left house has an additional window and two dormers.	II
16 and 18 Henrietta Street; 54.48933°N 0.61084°W		18th century	A pair of rendered houses with a floor band and a pantile roof. There are two storeys and two bays. On the front are two doorways, one with a rectangular fanlight, and the windows are sashes in architraves.	II
20 Henrietta Street; 54.48939°N 0.61073°W		18th century	The house is in stone with a slate roof. There are two storeys and attics, and two bays. The central doorway has a rectangular fanlight, and the windows are double-hung sashes in architraves, all with flat stone arches. By the doorway is an inset foot scraper with an ogivil arch.	II
26 Henrietta Street; 54.48956°N 0.61040°W		18th century	The house is rendered, and has an eaves cornice and a pantile roof. There are two storeys and attics, and one bay. The doorway is on the right return, and is approached by steps with railings. There is one modern casement window, and the other windows are sashes.	II
28 and 30 Henrietta Street; 54.48962°N 0.61026°W		18th century	Two rendered houses, each on a plinth, with a floor band and pantile roofs. Both have two storeys and attics, the left house has three bays, and the right house has two. The left house has an archway on the left with a rusticated head, and the right house has a doorway approached by steps. Both houses have sash windows and dormers.	II
35 Henrietta Street; 54.48944°N 0.61084°W		18th century	The house is rendered and has a pantile roof. There are two storeys and attics and two bays. The doorway and windows are modern, and there are two sloped dormers.	II
37 Henrietta Street; 54.48949°N 0.61076°W		18th century	The house is in brick, rendered on the front, with a pantile roof. There are two storeys and attics, and three bays. The doorway on the right has a plain surround, the ground floor windows are horizontally sliding sashes, on the upper floor are modern windows, and above is a sloped dormer.	II
1–4 Hall's Yard; 54.48354°N 0.60954°W	—	18th century	A row of four brick houses on a plinth with a pantile roof. The left house has one storey and the others have two. The doorways are plain, and most of the windows are double-hung sashes. The right house is at right angles, and has fixed windows with one opening casement.	II
5 Hall's Yard; 54.48357°N 0.60935°W	—	18th century	The house is in stone and has a pantile roof. There are two storeys and two bays. On the ground floor are a modern door and a double-hung sash window, and the upper floor has horizontally sliding sashes.	II
4 and 5 Ivy Yard; 54.48342°N 0.60940°W	—	18th century	Two houses in brick with a pantile roof. There are two storeys and attics, and each house has one bay. No 4 has a modern door in the upper floor, and the ground floor doorway of No 5 is plain. There is one fixed window with one opening light, and the other windows are modern.	II
10–12 Kiln Yard; 54.48877°N 0.61178°W	—	18th century	A row of three houses in painted brick with a pantile roof. There is one storey and attics, and an outshut. On the front are three doorways, the windows are sashes, and there is one dormer.	II
13, 14 and 16 Kiln Yard; 54.48883°N 0.61171°W	—	18th century	Three houses in painted brick, No 13 rendered on the ground floor, with pantile roofs. No 13 has two storeys, a plain door with a sloped hood, modern windows and a basement window at the rear. No 14 has one storey, a small window and a modern door. No 16 has two storeys, two plain doors, a horizontally sliding sash window on the upper floor and a modern window on the ground floor.	II
8–11 Market Place; 54.48777°N 0.61244°W		18th century	A row of four shops in red brick with a hipped pantile roof. There are two storeys, attics and basements, four bays, and a single-storey outshut on the left. On the ground floor are shopfronts, one dating from the late 19th century and the others are modern. The upper floor contains sash windows with flush frames, and above are four dormers with casements.	II
2 Salt Pan Well Steps; 54.48272°N 0.60957°W	—	18th century	The house is in brick, with a rendered gable and a pantile roof. There is a single storey and two bays. It has a modern door, and two fixed windows with one opening light.	II
3–6 Salt Pan Well Steps; 54.48263°N 0.60956°W	—	18th century	A row of four brick houses with a Welsh slate roof. There are three storeys and each house has two bays. There are two doorways at ground floor level and two on the middle floor, with brick arches, and the windows are double-hung sashes in flush frames.	II
13 Salt Pan Well Steps; 54.48276°N 0.60926°W	—	18th century	The house is in painted brick with a pantile roof. There is one storey and an attic, and two bays. The doorway and windows are modern, and there are two dormers.	II
3A Sandgate; 54.48738°N 0.61277°W	—	18th century	The house is in painted brick on a stone base, with a pantile roof. There are three storeys rising from the water's edge, and three bays. Over the ground floor is a wooden gallery.	II
5, 5D and 6 Sandgate; 54.48754°N 0.61269°W	—	18th century	A pair of shops and a building at the rear in red brick. The shops have three storeys and three bays. The ground floor contains two 19th-century shopfronts with reeded surrounds, roundels and blocked rectangular fanlights, and between them is a passage doorway. The windows are double-hung sashes in flush frames.	II
8 Sandgate; 54.48765°N 0.61273°W	—	18th century	The shop is in brick with a pantile roof. There are three storeys and two bays. The ground floor contains a late 19th-century shopfront, and above are modern casement windows.	II
12 Sandgate; 54.48761°N 0.61253°W	—	18th century	The shop is in rendered brick and has a parapet. There are three storeys and two bays. On the ground floor are two shopfronts with pilasters, quoins, a fascia and a cornice, and a modern door. The upper floors contain modern casement windows, with moulded surrounds, stone arches and keystones.	II
1 and 2 White Horse Yard; 54.48758°N 0.61152°W	—	18th century	The two buildings are in brick and have a pantile roof with a stone kneeler. There are two storeys and three bays. On the ground floor are two modern doorways with rectangular fanlights, and two stable doors. Most of the windows are double-hung sashes in flush frames with stone arches.	II
2A White Horse Yard; 54.48768°N 0.61130°W	—	18th century	The house is in brick with a stone sill band and a pantile roof. There are three storeys and three bays. The doorway has a rectangular fanlight and a cornice on consoles. The windows are double-hung sashes in flush frames with stone arches.	II
4 White Horse Yard; 54.48773°N 0.61148°W	—	18th century	The building is in stone, and has a pantile roof with stone kneelers. There are three storeys and two bays. Steps lead up to the doorway on the middle floor, and the windows are double-hung sashes. On the ground floor are garages and two doors.	II
4–6 White Horse Yard; 54.48777°N 0.61125°W	—	18th century	The houses are rendered and have a pantile roof. There are two storeys and three bays. The doorways have pedimented hoods, and the windows are modern casements in elliptical-arched reveals.	II
16 White Horse Yard; 54.48760°N 0.61100°W	—	18th century	The building is rendered, and has a pentice pantile roof. There is one storey and one bay. The doorway has a sloped hood on consoles, and the window is a double-hung sash window in a flush frame.	II
17 White Horse Yard; 54.48758°N 0.61111°W	—	18th century	The house is rendered and has a pantile roof. There are two storeys and attics and two bays. On the front is a single-storey extension with a doorway and a 19th-century window. On the main part is a dormer.	II
3 Woodwark's Yard; 54.48861°N 0.61177°W	—	18th century	The house is in rendered stone and has a pantile roof. There are three storeys and two bays. The doorway is in the centre, and the windows have two or three lights.	II
Abbeville Cottage; 54.48439°N 0.60986°W		18th century	The cottage is rendered and has a pantile roof. There are two storeys and an attic, and one bay. On the left is a doorway in an architrave with grooved pilasters, and a flat hood on brackets. The windows are sashes in flush frames, and on the attic is a sloped dormer.	II
Bell Island Cottage; 54.48402°N 0.60967°W		18th century	The house is in brick, and has a pantile roof with kneelers. There are three storeys and an attic, and one bay. The doorway is on the right, the windows are modern with flat brick arches, and there is a flat-roofed dormer.	II
Board Inn; 54.48890°N 0.61224°W		18th century (pobable)	The public house is rendered and has a pantile roof with a stone gable end and kneelers. There are two storeys and an attic, and one bay, and the gable end faces the street. The ground floor contains a doorway and a four-light window to the left, on the upper floor is a three light window, and the gable has two small casement windows.	II
Donkey Road; 54.48884°N 0.61134°W		18th century (probable)	A steep stone track forming part of Church Lane, rising towards St Mary's Church, and adjacent to the 199 steps. Most of the present stones probably date from the 19th century.	I
Horn Garth Cottage; 54.48324°N 0.60912°W	—	18th century	The house is rendered, and has a Welsh slate roof with stone kneelers. There are two storeys and attics, and five bays. On the front are two doorways with fanlights, the windows have flush frames, and there are two flat-topped dormers.	II
Old Bridge west of Spital Bridge; 54.48099°N 0.61112°W		18th century	The bridge carries a road over Spital Beck. It is in stone and consists of a single round arch with a parapet.	II
Post Office; 54.48818°N 0.61203°W		18th century	The post office is rendered, and has an eaves cornice and a pantile roof. There are three storeys and attics, and two bays. On the ground floor is a 19th-century shopfront with a fascia, and to its left is a modern door. The upper floors contain double-hung sash windows, and there is one gabled dormer. On the left return are two blocked mullioned windows.	II
Seagull Cottage; 54.48269°N 0.60919°W	—	18th century	The house is in brick, the upper floor rendered, and it has a pantile roof. There are two storeys and two bays. The windows are fixed, some with an opening light. On the ground floor one window and the modern door have an elliptical-headed reveal.	II
St Patrick's Church; 54.48297°N 0.60967°W		18th century	A private house, later a church, it is in brick on a stone plinth, and has a parapet with corniced capping, and a pantile roof. There are two storeys and seven bays. In the centre is the entrance to a recessed doorway, with a rectangular fanlight. The windows are double-hung sashes in flush frames, and all the openings have flat arches and painted brick voussoirs.	II
The Black Horse Public House and 91 Church Street; 54.48776°N 0.61186°W		18th century	The public house and the shop to the right are in painted brick, with three storeys and four bays. On the left is a flat carriage arch, and the public house has a plinth, two windows in a rendered architrave with four pilasters, and to the left is a doorway. Above is a fascia with the name. The shop has an early 20th-century shopfront with elaborate foliated consoles, a recessed door to the right with a blocked fanlight, and rendered stall risers. On the upper floors are sash windows with flush frames.	II
The Clinic; 54.48678°N 0.61199°W		18th century	The house is in red brick, with a sill band over scrolled decoration, and a dentilled eaves cornice. There are three storeys and four bays. The doorway on the right has pilasters, a rectangular fanlight, a decorated frieze, and a pediment on elaborate consoles, and there is a doorway on the left with a segmental head and a keystone. The windows are sashes, those in the middle floor with segmental heads and keystones, the window in the third bay paired under a pediment, and on the top floor they have flat brick arches.	II
12–14 Church Street; 54.48279°N 0.60975°W		Late 18th century	A row of three houses, later altered, in brick with a moulded cornice, a parapet, and a pantile roof. There are three storeys and four bays. The ground floor contains a garage door flanked by doorways, one with an architrave, and a window to the right. On the upper floors are double-hung sash windows in moulded frames.	II
25 Church Street; 54.48379°N 0.60954°W		Late 18th century	A house, later part of a public house, in painted brick, with stone quoins, and a pantile roof. There are three storeys and an attic, and two bays. On the left is a doorway with pilasters, a blank radiating fanlight and an open pediment. The windows are double-hung sashes, and there is a gabled dormer.	II
57 Church Street and 1 Lockeys Yard; 54.48624°N 0.61074°W		Late 18th century	A shop with living accommodation above in stone, with a pantile roof and a raised and coped gable with kneelers. There are three storeys and two bays. On the ground floor is a 20th-century shopfront with a central doorway, and above are sash windows.	II
86 Church Street; 54.48745°N 0.61173°W		Late 18th century	The building is in brick, with rusticated quoins, and a stone capped parapet. There are four storeys and four bays. On the ground floor is an early 19th-century shopfront with fluted Ionic pilasters, and to the right is a passage entry. The upper floors contain double-hung sash windows in moulded frames with painted voussoirs.	II
96 Church Street; 54.48780°N 0.61206°W		Late 18th century	The shop, which has an earlier core, is in painted brick with a pantile roof. There are three storeys and attics, and three bays. The ground floor has a double shop window with a fascia and four consoles, and a central doorway, and to the right is a segmental-arched passage entry. On the upper floors are sash windows, and above are two sloped dormers. At the rear are mullioned windows.	II
99 Church Street; 54.48814°N 0.61209°W		Late 18th century	The shop is in brick, with rusticated quoins, a dentilled eaves cornice, and a pantile roof with stone kneelers. There are three storeys and three bays. On the ground floor is a late 19th-century shopfront, and to the left is a passage entry. The upper floors contain sash windows in moulded architraves, and above are two gabled dormers.	II
105 Church Street; 54.48847°N 0.61206°W		Late 18th century	A shop in brick with floor bands and a pantile roof. There are thee storeys and a basement, and two bays. The ground floor contains a shopfront, and above are sash windows with moulded frames under relieving arches.	II
6 Clark's Yard; 54.48752°N 0.61120°W	—	Late 18th century	The house is in brick, with the rear in stone, and a pantile roof with stone coping on the west gable. There are two storeys and two bays. On the front is a porch with a cornice and a flat hood. The windows are sashes with stone wedge lintels, and there are roof dormers.	II
2 New Way Ghaut; 54.48838°N 0.61238°W	—	Late 18th century	The house is in brick with a pantile roof. There are two storeys and a basement, and two bays, The windows are double-hung sashes, and there is one dormer.	II
3 New Way Ghaut; 54.48838°N 0.61248°W	—	Late 18th century	The house is in brick with a pantile roof. There are two storeys and attics, and two bays. The doorway is on the middle floor. The ground floor windows have 19th-century glazing, those above are double-hung sashes, and there is one dormer.	II
4 New Way Ghaut; 54.48839°N 0.61255°W	—	Late 18th century	The house is in brick with stone dressings and a pantile roof. The front facing the street has two storeys and an attic, one bay, quoins, and a window with a stone arch. The river front has two storeys and three bays. It has a stone base, it is partly rendered, and contains modern windows. There is one dormer.	II
6–8 New Way Ghaut; 54.48866°N 0.61246°W	—	Late 18th century	A row of three rendered houses with a pantile roof and two storeys. One of the doorways has a sloped hood on consoles. The windows are a mix of double-hung sashes and modern windows.	II
8 Salt Pan Well Steps; 54.48269°N 0.60936°W	—	Late 18th century	The house is in brick with a pantile roof. There are two storeys and one bay. The ground floor contains a modern three-light casement window and a doorway, both with an elliptical-arched reveals, and above is a horizontally sliding sash window.	II
Fortune's Whitby Kippers; 54.48944°N 0.61061°W		Late 18th century	The building is in stone, partly painted, and partly rendered on the front facing the street. There are two storeys and fronts of one bay. On the front facing the street is one window in an architrave, and the gabled right return has two doorways and windows on the ground floor, and a loading door above.	II
Ghaut End; 54.48881°N 0.61246°W	—	Late 18th century	The house is rendered, and has a pantile roof and two storeys. The doorway has a pedimented hood, and the windows date from the 19th century.	II
Whitehall; 54.47990°N 0.61119°W		Late 18th century	The house is rendered, and has a parapet and a slate roof. There are two storeys, a basement and attics, and three bays. The outer bays contain full-height canted bay windows with keystones. Steps with railings lead up to the central doorway that has Doric columns and a pediment. Above the doorway is a sash window with a keystone, and above are two flat-roofed dormers.	II
White Horse and Griffin Inn; 54.48754°N 0.61184°W		Late 18th century	The public house is rendered and has a cornice above the ground floor. There are three storeys and two bays. The ground floor has a passage entry on the left, and to the right is a doorway with reeded Ionic pilasters on plinths, and a curving dentiled pediment containing decoration. Above it is a small window, and the upper floors contain double-hung sash windows.	II
Old Town Hall; 54.48787°N 0.61224°W		1788	The town hall is in stone with a slate roof. It has an open ground floor, with Tuscan columns, and a central stone cylinder containing a stairway. On the upper floor, the north front has a Venetian window, quoins, and a dated and inscribed oval plaque, and above is a pediment containing a shield of arms. The south front is similar, but without the plaque, and with a round window in the tympanum. The sides contain double-hung sash windows. On the top is a rectangular clock turret, a cornice, and an octagonal arcaded louvred domed bellcote with a gold ball and a fish weathervane.	II*
Fish Pier; 54.48826°N 0.61317°W		Before 1790	The pier extends into the River Esk from its east bank. It has been the site of the fish market since 1790.	II
St Hilda's Hospital; 54.48247°N 0.60815°W		1793	Originally a workhouse, later used for other purposes, it is in brick with a slate roof. There are two storeys and a total front of 18 bays. In the centre is a round-headed doorway with an architrave. The three bays on each side of the doorway are under a gable containing a round window. The windows in the upper floor of these bays are round-headed, and elsewhere they have flat heads. On the roof is a bellcote.	II
Campion Bank House; 54.48585°N 0.61049°W		1800	The house is in brick, the basement is in stone, and it has a band over the basement, sill bands, an eaves cornice, and a pantile roof. There are three storeys and four bays. The entrance on the right has pilasters, an architrave, a blank ornamental fanlight, and a moulded round-arched head with a triple keystone. Inside, steps lead up to a doorway with a round-headed fanlight. The windows are double-hung sashes with flat stone arches.	II
1–6 Raft Yard; 54.48106°N 0.61009°W	—	Late 18th to early 19th century	A row of six cottages in brick on a stone base, with a pantile roof, stone gable ends and kneelers. There are two storeys and eight bays. The windows are a mix of double-hung sashes and casements, and there are two sloped dormers.	II
1 and 2 Tate Hill; 54.48917°N 0.61176°W		Late 18th to early 19th century	A pair of rendered houses on a plinth with a hipped pantile roof. There are two storeys and two bays. The doorway has a segmental-arched head, and the windows are casements with rendered flat arches.	II
Customs House; 54.48765°N 0.61287°W	—	Late 18th or early 19th century	The building is rendered and has a Welsh slate roof with stone capped gable ends. There are three storeys and two bays. The upper floors contain two-storey canted bay windows and a balcony. On the right is a French window, and the other windows are double-hung sashes.	II
Friends Meeting House; 54.48702°N 0.61167°W		1813	The meeting house was built on the site of an earlier meeting house, and has since been used for other purposes. It is in stone, and has two storeys and two bays. The front facing the street has a pediment containing a round window. On the ground floor are round-headed windows with a keystone, and the upper floor has taller round-arched windows in an architrave.	II
1–5 Prospect Place; 54.48372°N 0.60930°W	—	1816	A terrace of five stone houses with a Welsh slate roof. There are three storeys and basements. The doorways are approached by steps, two doorways have retained curved pedimented doorheads with carved modillions, and the doors vary. The windows are double-hung sashes. To the left of centre is a passageway with an inscribed and dated plaque.	II
6–10 Prospect Place; 54.48372°N 0.60917°W	—	1816	A terrace of five stone houses with a Welsh slate roof. There are three storeys and basements. The doorways are approached by steps, and the doors vary. The windows are double-hung sashes, and there is a central passageway.	II
14 Blackburn's Yard; 54.48853°N 0.61123°W	—	Early 19th century	The building is in painted brick and has a Welsh slate roof. There is one storey, and a jet worker's workshop at a lower level. The door has a three-light rectangular fanlight.	II
15 Blackburn's Yard; 54.48836°N 0.61129°W	—	Early 19th century	The house is in brick with a slate roof. There are two storeys and attics, an L-shaped plan and a front of two bays. The doorway has an architrave and a rectangular fanlight. The windows are double-hung sashes with flat stone arches.	II
12 and 13 Bridge Street; 54.48715°N 0.61197°W		Early 19th century	A pair of stone shops with rusticated quoins, a string course, a blocking course and a moulded cornice. There are three storeys and three bays. On the ground floor are a 19th-century and a modern shopfront. The central window on the middle floor has rendered Doric pilasters, and a round head with a long keystone. On the top floor the left bay has an oriel window, and the other windows have shouldered moulded rendered architraves.	II
14 and 15 Bridge Street; 54.48716°N 0.61214°W		Early 19th century	A pair of shops in pale brick, with a wooden modillion eaves cornice and a pantile roof. There are three storeys and two bays. On the ground floor are a 19th-century and a modern shopfront, and the upper floors contain double-hung sash windows with flat brick arches.	II
16 Bridge Street; 54.48716°N 0.61230°W		Early 19th century	The shop is in brick and has a modern asbestos tile roof. There are three storeys and two bays. The ground floor contains a 19th-century and modern shopfront, and on the upper floors are paired double-hung sash windows with flat rendered arches, and an additional small window between those in the upper floor on the right.	II
17 Bridge Street; 54.48714°N 0.61244°W		Early 19th century	The shop, on a corner site, is in painted brick, with a floor band, an eaves band, and a pantile roof, hipped on the right. There are three storeys and six bays, curving round the corner. The ground floor contains shopfronts, and on the upper floors are sash windows, those on the corner canted with three lights.	II
11 Church Street; 54.48269°N 0.60974°W		Early 19th century	The house is in brick on a stone plinth, with rusticated quoins, and a slate roof with stone gable ends and kneelers. There are three storeys and two bays. In the centre is a doorway with pilasters, a rectangular fanlight, and an open pediment. The windows are sashes in flush frames.	II
47 and 48 Church Street; 54.48570°N 0.61040°W		Early 19th century	A pair of rendered houses with a Welsh slate roof. There are three storeys and attics, and two days. In the centre are paired doorways under a pediment that extends to a cornice over the ground floor windows. The left house has sash windows and a gabled dormer, and the right house has casement windows and a flat-topped dormer.	II
49 and 49A Church Street; 54.48574°N 0.61043°W		Early 19th century	A pair of stone houses with a wooden eaves cornice and a Welsh slate roof. There are three storeys and two bays. On the front are two doorways with rectangular fanlights, and a passage doorway on the far left. The windows are double-hung sashes.	II
87 Church Street; 54.48750°N 0.61181°W		Early 19th century	The shop is in brick, and has four storeys and two bays. On the ground floor are two doorways with fanlights in a late 19th-century shopfront with a glass board and a tiled stall riser. The upper floors contain double-hung sash windows with painted brick voussoirs.	II
88 Church Street; 54.48760°N 0.61185°W		Early 19th century	The shop is rendered and has a dentilled eaves cornice. There are three storeys and three bays. The ground floor contains a 19th-century shopfront with elaborately carved consoles, and above are sash windows. At the rear there are four storeys, floor bands, a doorway with a cornice on consoles, and a rounded projecting corner.	II
112 and 112A Church Street; 54.48888°N 0.61204°W		Early 19th century	A shop on a corner site, it is rendered, and has a sill band, a cornice and a blocking course. There are three storeys, two bays on the front, one on the left return, and a curved corner between. The ground floor contains 19th-century shopfronts, one with a tiled stall riser, and a doorway on the corner. The upper floors have double-hung sash windows.	II
117 Church Street; 54.48891°N 0.61165°W		Early 19th century	The shop is in painted brick with a pantile roof. There are three storeys and attics, and two bays. The ground floor has a modern bow window, a doorway to the left, a window to the further left, and to the right is a passageway with a round-arched head. The windows are sashes with rendered flat arches, and there are two modern dormers.	II
142 Church Street; 54.48821°N 0.61225°W		Early 19th century	A shop in brick with a parapet and a hipped pantile roof. There are three storeys and two bays. On the ground floor are two bow windows flanking a doorway with a five-light fanlight, and to the left is a plain doorway. The upper floors contain mullioned windows.	II
6 Grape Lane; 54.48688°N 0.61210°W		Early 19th century	A shop in brick with rusticated quoins, a blocking course, and a stone cornice. There are four storeys and three bays. On the ground floor is a modern shopfront, and above are double-hung sash windows.	II
5A and 5B Sandgate; 54.48755°N 0.61286°W	—	Early 19th century (probable)	A shop in brick, with a Welsh slate roof, three storeys and three bays. The ground floor contains a shopfront including two doorways with architraves and rectangular fanlights. The windows are a mix of sashes and later casements. No 5B is in the yard at the rear.	II
11 Sandgate; 54.48770°N 0.61250°W	—	Early 19th century	The shop is rendered, and has three storeys and one bay. On the ground floor is a shopfront with pilasters and a wooden stall riser. The middle floor contains a sash window, and on the top floor is modern window.	II
The Shipyard Club; 54.48086°N 0.61138°W		Early 19th century	A warehouse, later used for other purposes, it is in stone with a Welsh slate roof. There are three storeys and an L-shaped plan. The windows are double-hung sashes, those in the main part with stone arches and keystones, and there is one dormer.	II
Workshop, White Horse Yard; 54.48767°N 0.61130°W	—	Early 19th century	The workshop is in brick on a stone base, with a pantile roof. There are two storeys and four bays. On the ground floor are double carriage doors to the right, a large window, a central passage and a door to the left. The upper floor has four windows and a storage door.	II
Seamen's Hospital; 54.48541°N 0.61030°W		1842	The building was designed by George Gilbert Scott on a site founded in 1675. It is in brick on a stone plinth, with stone dressings, quoins, a floor band, and an openwork balustraded parapet with vases. There are two storeys and nine bays. In the centre is a round-headed archway, above which is a round-arched niche containing a statue of a seaman. Over this is a trophy of flags and cannon, and a shaped pediment surmounted by a model ship. The second and eight bays project slightly and contain a round-headed archway with a rusticated surround, over which is a semicircular oriel window, and a shaped pediment over an oculus with keystones. The other windows are mullioned and transomed.	II
11 Bridge Street; 54.48717°N 0.61182°W		Mid-19th century	A curved building on a corner site, in stone, with a sill band, a moulded blocking course and a cornice. There are three storeys and attics, and five bays, the outer bays slightly projecting and flanked by rusticated quoins. On the ground floor is a shopfront, and to its left is a doorway with a vermiculated surround and a semicircular fanlight. The windows on the middle floor have cornices on consoles, and the top floor has square windows with shouldered architraves.	II
Clothing Factory; 54.48798°N 0.61278°W		Mid 19th century	Originally a covered market, later a retail centre, it is rendered on a stone base, and has a hipped tile roof. There are two storeys, the upper storey overhanging on iron and wood supports, and nine bays. The windows on the upper floor are sashes. There is a section in stone at right angles with two storeys and a modern asbestos roof.	II
Workshop, Blackburn's Yard; 54.48819°N 0.61123°W	—	Mid 19th century	The former workshop is in red brick with a Welsh slate roof. It contains large glazed windows, two with segmental arches in yellow brick.	II
East Pier Lighthouse; 54.49286°N 0.61190°W		1854	The lighthouse consists of a stone column containing a door and windows. It is surmounted by an octagonal lantern with a lead dome.	II
Cholmley School; 54.48850°N 0.61221°W		1868	The former school is in stone on a plinth, with a sill band and a slate roof. There are two storeys and an attic, two bays, and the gable end faces the street. On the right is a doorway with a pointed head, half-columns with foliated capitals, and a hood mould. To the left is a sash window with a pointed head, two lights divided by a half-column with a foliated capital, and a pointed hood mould containing a quatrefoil. The upper floor contains a similar window without a quatrefoil, and above is a small circular window with a quatrefoil and a hood mould.	II
Fish Pier Pumping Station; 54.48833°N 0.61296°W		Late 19th century	The pumping station is in red brick, with bands and decoration in blue brick, on a base of large stone blocks. It has quoins, and a red tile roof with a modified hip and a vent. The building contains doorways and windows with ornamental surrounds.	II
Telephone kiosk, Church Street; 54.48732°N 0.61167°W		1935	The telephone kiosk in Church Street is of the K6 type designed by Giles Gilbert Scott. Constructed in cast iron with a square plan and a dome, it has three unperforated crowns in the top panels.	II
