= Abbey Stables =

Historic building in Whitby, North Yorkshire

- The building in 2026

- Location within North Yorkshire

General information
- Location: Whitby, North Yorkshire, England
- Coordinates: 54°29′18″N 0°36′34″W
- Year built: 17th century

Listed Building – Grade I
- Official name: Youth Hostel
- Designated: 23 February 1954
- Reference no.: 1366588

The Abbey Stables (officially listed as Youth Hostel) is a historic building in Whitby, a town in North Yorkshire, England.

The stables were constructed in the 17th century, for the neighbouring Abbey House. They may occupy the site of Whitby Abbey's hospital. The stables were derelict by the early 20th century, and between 1932 and 1934, they were converted into a youth hostel, at a cost of £750. It could initially accommodate 40 people, but was extended to accommodate 70 by 1938. It was acquired for war use in 1940, but returned to the Youth Hostels Association in 1945. The roof was replaced in 1956, and by 1964, the hostel had expanded further, to occupy the entire length of the building. The hostel closed in 2006, moving into Abbey House.

The building was Grade I listed in 1954, its high grade being due to the group value it has with Abbey House. It is built of stone with a moulded cornice and a pantile roof. It has one storey and attics. On the front is a plain modern door with side lights, the windows are mullioned, and above is a range of modern dormers.

== See also ==
- Grade I listed buildings in North Yorkshire (district)
- Listed buildings in Whitby (central area - east)
