= Old Town Hall, Whitby =

Municipal building in Whitby, North Yorkshire, England

- Old Town Hall, Whitby

- Shown in North Yorkshire
- 54°29′16″N 0°36′44″W
- Location: Whitby, Borough of Scarborough, North Yorkshire

History
- Built: 1788

Site notes
- Architect: Jonathan Pickernell
- Architectural style: Neoclassical style

Listed Building – Grade II*
- Designated: 23 February 1954
- Reference no.: 1261706

The Old Town Hall, Whitby is a building on the Kirkgate section of Church Street, in the Old Town area of Whitby, North Yorkshire, England.

== History ==
The building was commissioned and paid for by the local lord of the manor, Nathaniel Cholmley, and was designed and built, in the neoclassical style, by the architect Jonathan Pickernell, who also constructed the two inner piers in Whitby Harbour between 1781 and 1812. It is located in the Old Town area of Whitby on the east side. The town hall was built when the market place was laid out to replace the earlier market place that was located on the west side of the River Esk at the west end of the bridge. The town hall measures 11 yards (10 m) in length and 9 yards (8.2 m) in width and was furnished with a clock at the expense of the town (the building being paid for privately). The clock tower also holds a bell which was tolled to start any court process.

The Old Town Hall served as the location for the first meeting of the Whitby Literary and Philosophical Society in September 1823. The society was started to provide funding and space to display fossils found in the environs of Whitby town. The present day location of this museum is in Pannett Park in the town.

The building has an open ground floor with the upper floor supported by Tuscan columns. This allowed the undercroft to be used for market trading. The upper floor, accessed by a spiral staircase in the centre of the lower floor, is where the Court Leet of Whitby, the Court of Pleas and the Court of Piepowder used to meet. Sometimes guilty parties would have to occupy the stocks outside the building. The arches on the upper floor are pedimented with Venetian windows.

The building was given listed status in 1954 and was renovated in 1987 but is prone to decay with some stone falling off the top of one of the columns.

== See also ==
- Grade II* listed buildings in North Yorkshire (district)
- Listed buildings in Whitby (central area - east)
