= Seamen's Hospital, Whitby =

Hospital building in North Yorkshire, England

Seamen's Hospital
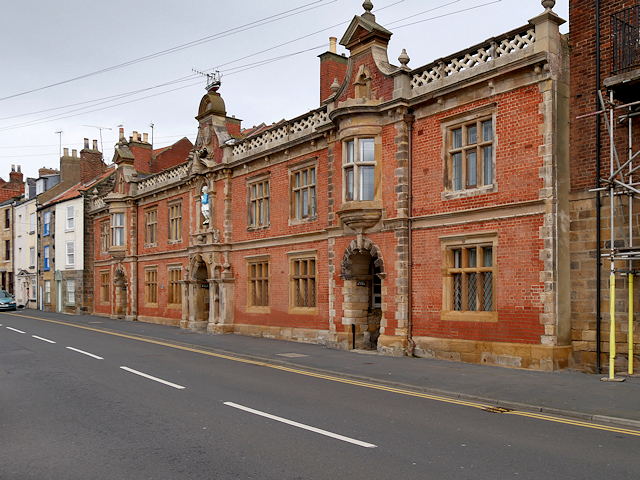
- The building in 2017

- Location within North Yorkshire

General information
- Type: Almhouses
- Location: Church Street, Whitby, North Yorkshire, England
- Coordinates: 54°29′08″N 0°36′37″W
- Year built: 1842

Design and construction
- Architect: George Gilbert Scott

Listed Building – Grade II
- Official name: Seamens Hospital
- Designated: 4 December 1972
- Reference no.: 1148336

The Seamen's Hospital is a historic building on Church Street in Whitby, a town in North Yorkshire, England.

The hospital was founded in 1675, and was converted into almshouses in the 18th century. From 1747, it was funded in part by the Chatham Chest. In 1842, it was demolished and replaced with a new structure designed by George Gilbert Scott, which was Grade II listed in 1972.

Constructed of brick on a stone plinth with stone dressings, quoins, a floor band, and an openwork balustraded parapet with vases, it has two storeys and nine bays. In the centre is a round-headed archway, above which is a round-arched niche containing a statue of a seaman. Over this is a trophy of flags and cannon, and a shaped pediment surmounted by a model ship. The second and eight bays project slightly and contain a round-headed archway with a rusticated surround, over which is a semicircular oriel window, and a shaped pediment over an oculus with keystones. The other windows are mullioned and transomed.

== See also ==
- Listed buildings in Whitby (central area - east)
