= St Hilda's Hospital =

Historic building in Whitby, North Yorkshire, England

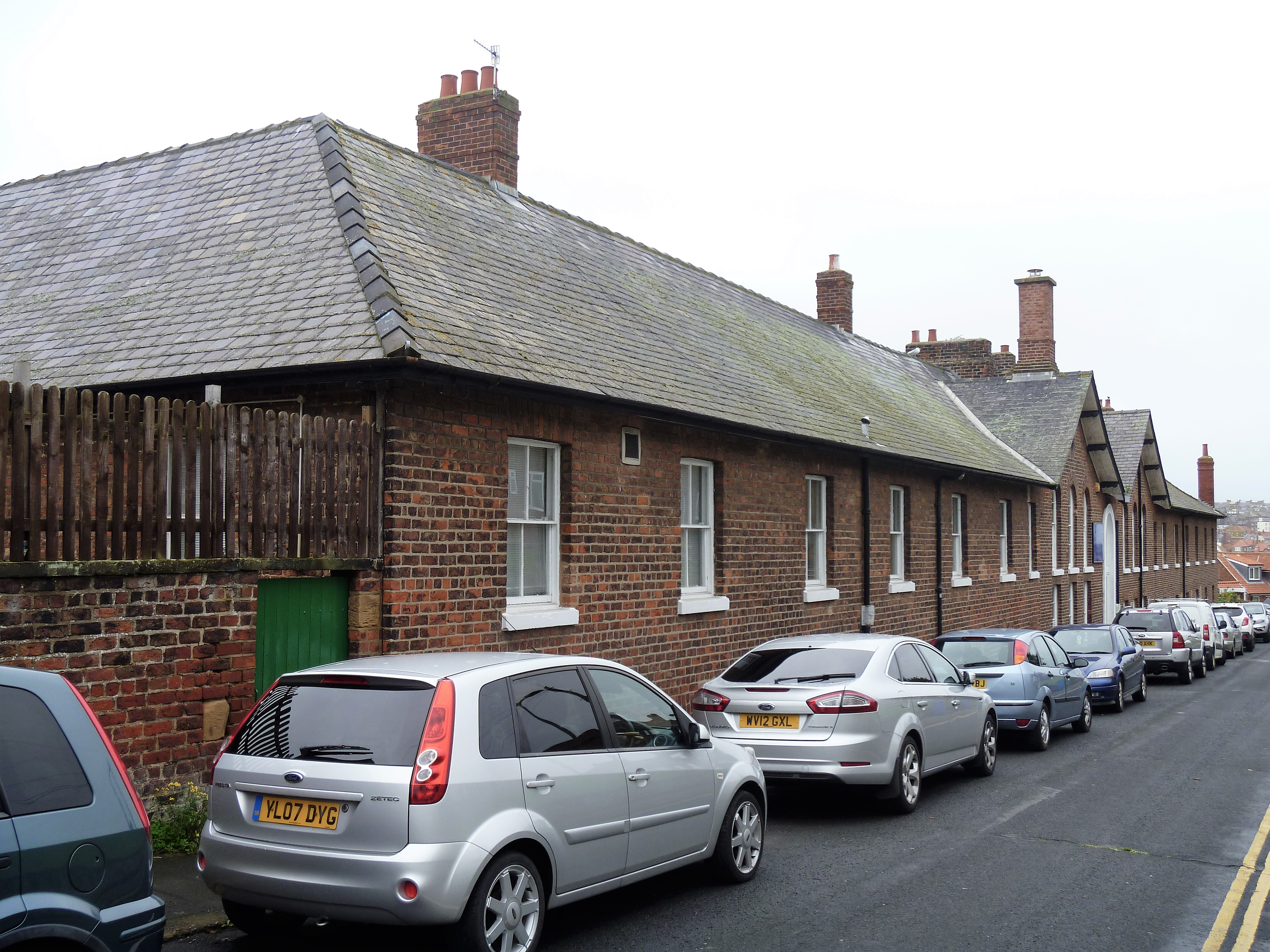
- The building in 2017

- Location within North Yorkshire

General information
- Location: The Ropery, Whitby, North Yorkshire, England
- Coordinates: 54°28′57″N 0°36′29″W
- Year built: 1793–94
- Renovated: 1860 (extended)

Renovating team
- Architect: J. B. and W. Atkinson

Website
- sthildasbusinesscentre.com

Listed Building – Grade II
- Official name: St Hildas Hospital
- Designated: 4 December 1972
- Reference no.: 1253831

St Hilda's Hospital is a historic building on The Ropery in Whitby, a town in North Yorkshire, England.

The building was constructed from 1793 to 1794, as the town's workhouse, replacing an earlier building on Church Street. In 1837, it was taken over by the new Whitby Poor Law Union. In 1860, it was extended to a design by J. B. and W. Atkinson, the work including a new infirmary. In 1948, it became part of the new National Health Service and was renamed "St Hilda's Hospital". It was converted for the treatment of elderly patients. In 1978, Whitby Hospital opened and St Hilda's Hospital closed. The building was converted to commercial use, and was later renamed St Hilda's Business Centre. The building has been Grade II listed since 1972.

The building is constructed of brick with a slate roof. It has two storeys and a total front of 18 bays. In the centre is a round-headed doorway with an architrave. The three bays on each side of the doorway are under a gable containing a round window. The windows in the upper floor of these bays are round-headed, and elsewhere they have flat heads. On the roof is a bellcote.

== See also ==
- Listed buildings in Whitby (central area - east)
