= Whitby 199 steps =

Grade I listed structure in North Yorkshire, England

- The 199 steps at Whitby

- Location within North Yorkshire
- 54.4887°N 0.611°W
- Type: Stone steps
- Location: Whitby, North Yorkshire, England

Listed Building – Grade I
- Official name: The Church Stairs
- Designated: 23 February 1954
- Reference no.: 1316348

The Whitby 199 steps (also known as The Church Stairs, the Church Steps and Jacob's Ladder) is a grade I listed structure between the Old Town and St Mary's Church, in Whitby, North Yorkshire, England. The 199 steps have been recorded since at least 1370, and until the 1770s, were made of wood. The flight of steps was viewed as a measure of the Christian determination of pilgrims up to Whitby Abbey (and later, the church), and have also served as a tourist attraction, being mentioned in the book Dracula, by Bram Stoker.

== History ==
The first mention of the steps is in a document from 1370, though it has been surmised that the pathway at least existed before this time as the Church of St Mary on the clifftop had been in existence since the 12th century. Sometimes referred to as Jacob's Ladder – a reference to a similar biblical allusion – the 199 steps were the most direct route from the town to the church for funeral processions. Level platforms still exist in several locations on the ascent to afford mourners the chance to 'rest' the coffin they are carrying, and to get their breath back. It is believed that the last coffin to be carried up the steps in this way, was a former rector of Whitby, the Reverend George Austen, whose funeral was in 1933. The steps were seen by some as the commitment of Christians in the town, having to travail to worship; however, some of the infirm were unable to climb the steps. This led to a new church being built on the west side of town in 1778, named St Ninians.

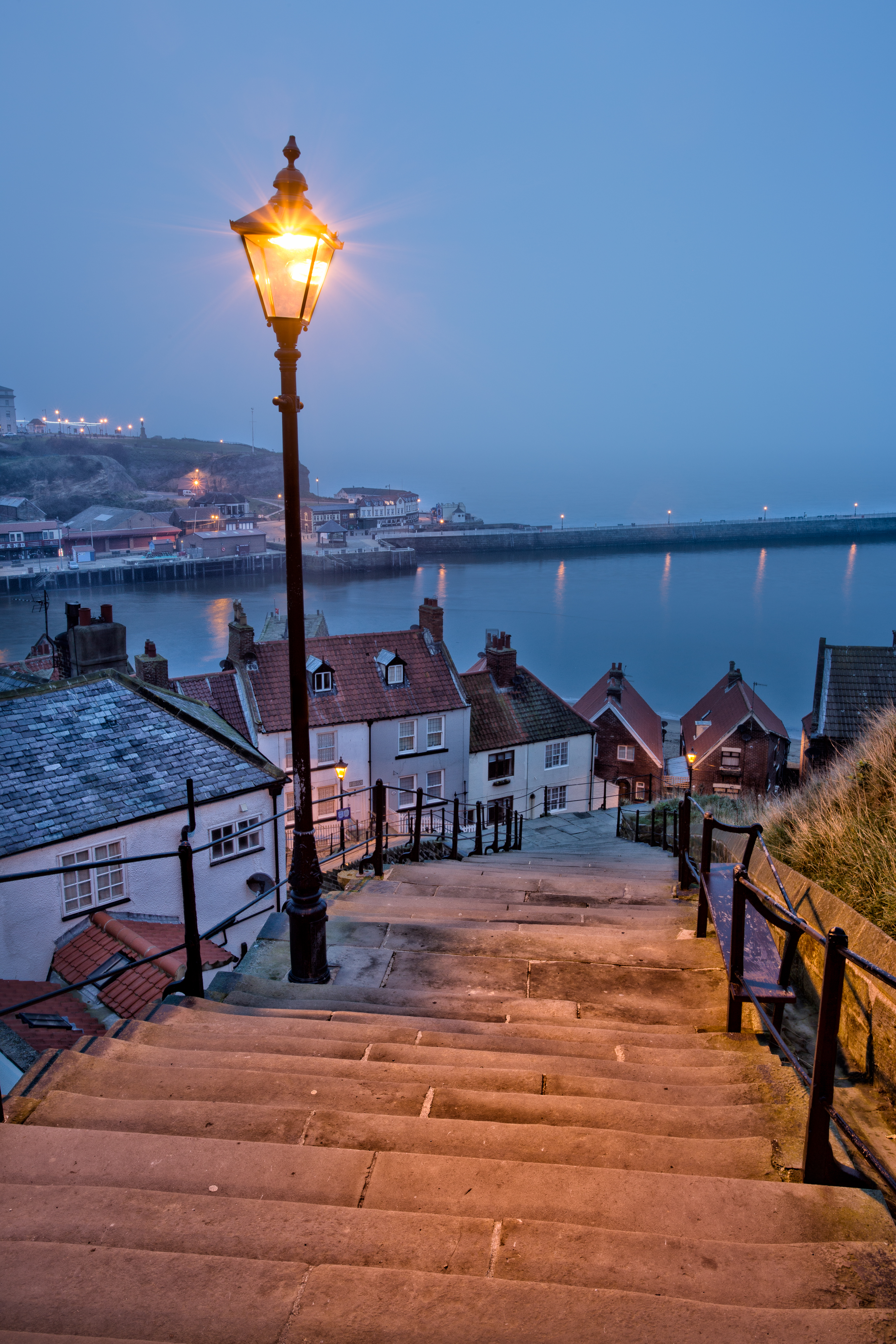
The 199 steps at twilight

In the 18th century, an act to bring all roads, tracks and pathways under local authority responsibility omitted the steps, so they remain the responsibility of the parochial church council of the Church of St Mary. Up until around 1774, the steps were made from wood and painted brightly. However, an act passed in 1764 required the owners to 'pave' the route, and so they acquired 103 tonnes (114 tons) of stone from a quarry at nearby Sneaton to improve the steps. The steps connect the east side of the harbour to the churchyard and cliff. The road at the bottom of the steps used to be called Henrietta Street; however, it has since been renamed Church Street.

As the stairs were used by worshippers to get to and from the church, the sight of the congregation all ascending and struggling with the climb led to Sir George Head being reminded of Bunyan's Hill of Difficulty. The number of steps was up for debate in the 18th and 19th centuries; John Wesley ascended the steps to preach at the top of the hill and proclaimed that they numbered 191, other historians claimed it was 190, and some guide books stipulated 194. This was settled in 1877 after a major restoration where the churchwardens entered into their records that the number was indeed 199.

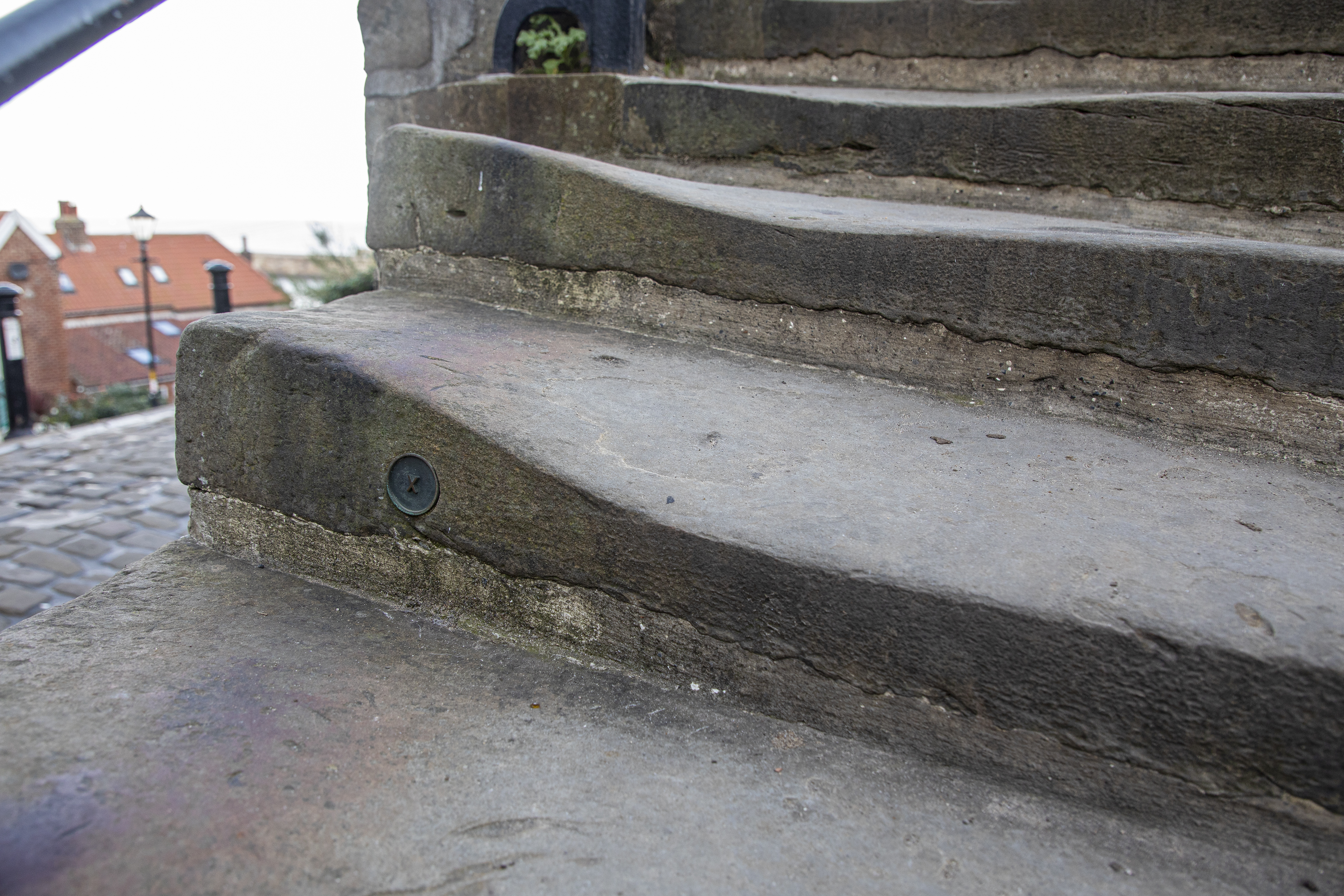
The tenth step, marked "X"

The 199 steps are mentioned in Dracula by Bram Stoker. Said to have been influenced by the wreck of the brigantine Dmitry (or Dimitry), which was stranded on Collier's Hope in the outer harbour, in Stoker's novel a ship (Demeter) is wrecked off Whitby and a black dog comes ashore, and ascends the 199 steps up to the churchyard. In his assessment of the Church of St Mary, Nikolaus Pevsner recommended climbing the steps to unfold the best view of the church and clifftop.

The steps were renovated in 1988, at a cost of £12,485, which included a donation from the Prince of Wales. In 2004 it was revealed that the lower end was sinking, and that they no longer were suitable for health and safety compliance. A public appeal for another renovation found 199 donors, each contributing £1,000 towards the renovation. The stairs are a grade I listed structure. Every tenth step, and the final step, have been annotated with a small circular disc stamped with a Roman numeral to help people to keep count.

== Donkey Road ==
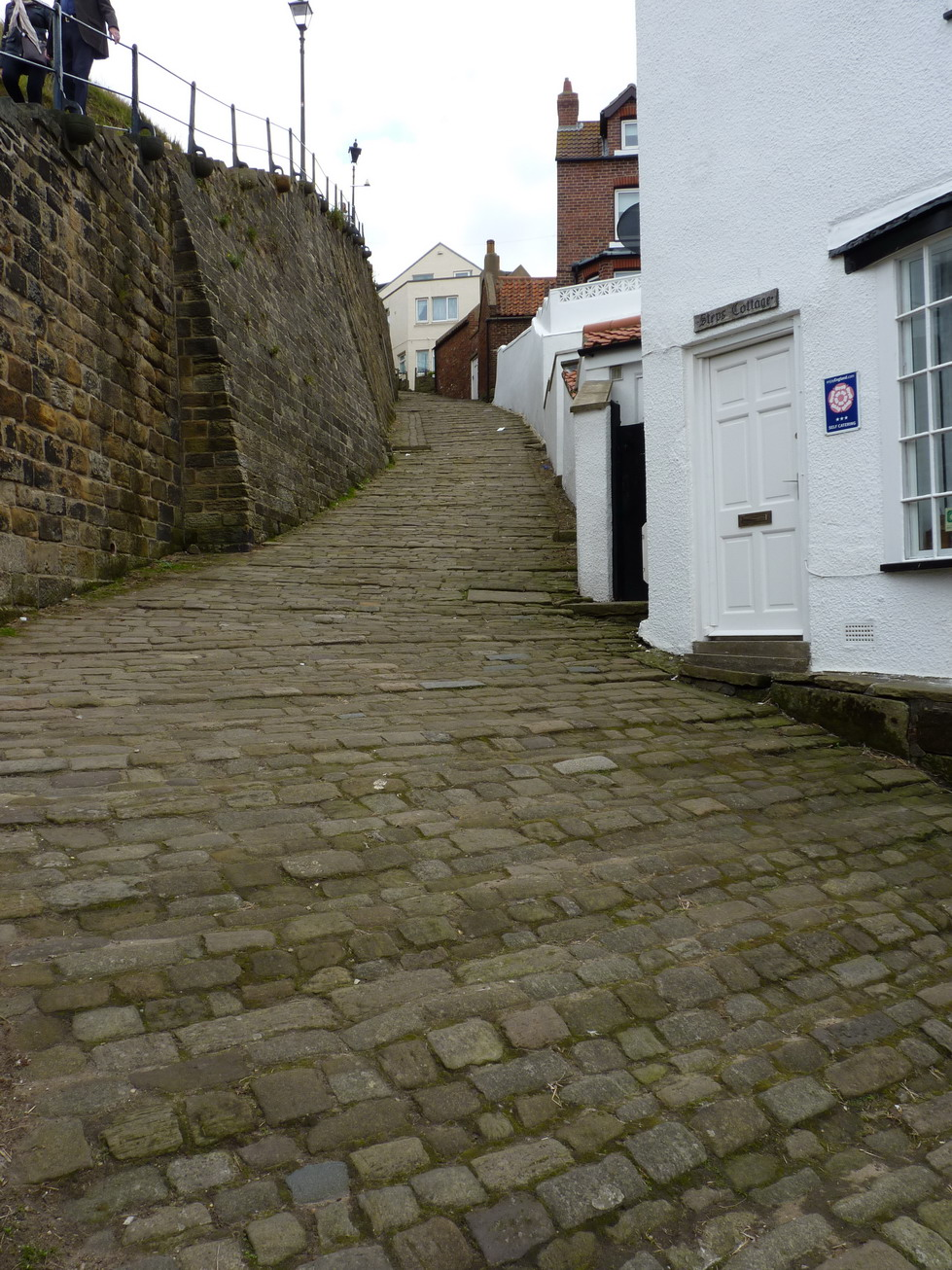
The Donkey Road

The steep slope alongside the steps, known as the "Donkey Road", is also a grade I listed structure. It has a near-50% gradient, and may have acquired its name from the walking of beach donkeys down it each morning and up each evening. Most of the present stones paving the road probably date from the 19th century.

== See also ==
- Grade I listed buildings in North Yorkshire (district)
- Listed buildings in Whitby (central area - east)
