= Whitby Quaker Meeting House =

Building in North Yorkshire, England

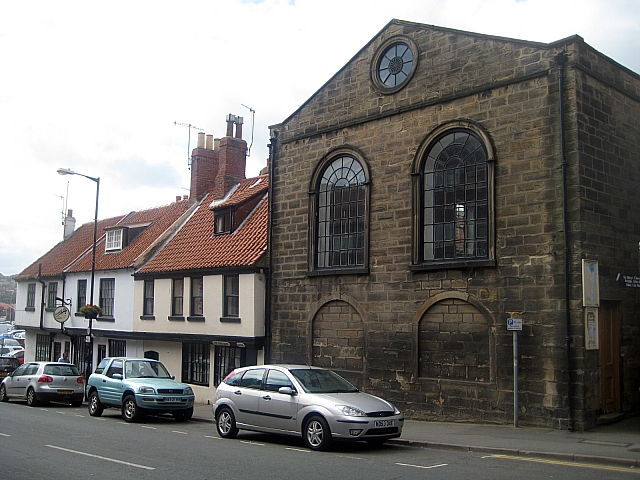
- The building in 2009

- Location within North Yorkshire

General information
- Type: Meeting house (former)
- Location: Church Street, Whitby, North Yorkshire, England
- Coordinates: 54°29′13″N 0°36′42″W
- Year built: 1813

Listed Building – Grade II
- Official name: Friends Meeting House
- Designated: 23 February 1954
- Reference no.: 1203655

Whitby Quaker Meeting House is a historic building on Church Street in Whitby, a town in North Yorkshire, England.

George Fox first preached in Whitby in 1651, and regular Quaker worship began the following year, arranged by John Whitehead. By 1659 there was a large enough community in the town to purchase land for a cemetery, and in 1676, a meeting house was finally constructed on Church Street. In 1813, the building was reconstructed and enlarged, but attendance fell, partly due to disputes over the arming of ships owned by Quakers. The meeting closed in 1850, and the Quarterly Meeting decided to sell the meeting house. This decision led to efforts to revive the meeting, and in 1866 the meeting house was reopened. The building was Grade II listed in 1954. The meeting house was closed in 2006, and converted into a restaurant.

The building is constructed of stone, and has two storeys and two bays. The front facing the street has a pediment containing a round window. On the ground floor are round-headed windows with a keystone, and the upper floor has taller round-arched windows in an architrave.

== See also ==
- Listed buildings in Whitby (central area - east)
