= St Patrick's Church, Whitby =

Church in Whitby, North Yorkshire, England

Coordinates: 54.483°N 0.609°W

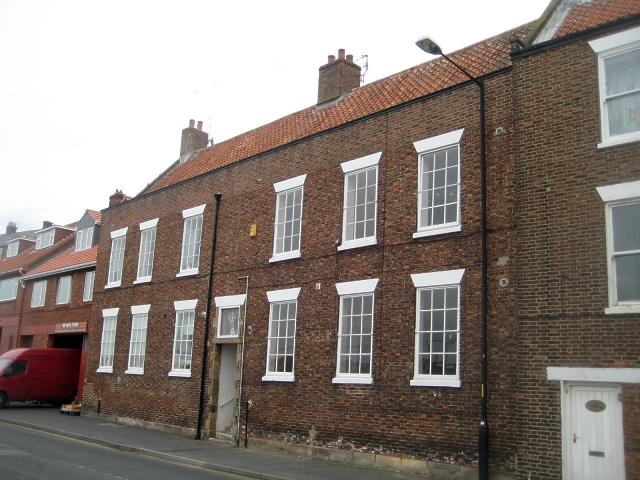
The church, in 2010

St Patrick's Church is a former Catholic church in Whitby, a town in North Yorkshire, in England.

A large house was built on Church Street in Whitby in the 18th century. In 1886, the right half of the building was converted into an infant school, run by the Sisters of Mercy. In 1930, the left half of the building was converted into a church. Initially in the parish of St Hilda's Church, Whitby, in 1976 it was given its own parish, but by 2003 the building needed major repairs and the church was closed and let out to tenants. The building has been grade II listed since 1965.

The building is constructed of brick on a stone plinth, and has a parapet with corniced capping, and a pantile roof. There are two storeys and seven bays. In the centre is the entrance to a recessed doorway, with a rectangular fanlight. The windows are double-hung sashes in flush frames, and all the openings have flat arches and painted brick voussoirs.

== See also ==
- Listed buildings in Whitby (central area - east)
