= St Mary's Church, Whitby =

Anglican church in Whitby, North Yorkshire, England

- The church, viewed from the south

- Location in Yorkshire
- 54°29′20″N 0°36′36″W
- OS grid reference: NZ 903 112
- Location: Whitby, North Yorkshire
- Country: England
- Denomination: Church of England

History
- Status: Parish church
- Founded: 12th century
- Dedication: St Mary

Architecture
- Functional status: Active
- Heritage designation: Grade I
- Designated: 23 February 1954
- Architectural type: Church

Administration
- Province: Province of York
- Diocese: Diocese of York
- Archdeaconry: Cleveland
- Deanery: Whitby
- Parish: Whitby

Clergy
- Rector: Reverend Michael Gobbett

The Church of Saint Mary is an Anglican parish church serving the town of Whitby in North Yorkshire England. It was founded around 1110, although its interior dates chiefly from the late 18th century. The church was designated a Grade I listed building on 23 February 1954. It is situated on the town's east cliff, overlooking the mouth of the River Esk overlooking the town, close to the ruins of Whitby Abbey. The Church Steps, a flight of 199 steps, lead up the hill to the church from the streets below. The church graveyard is used as a setting in Bram Stoker's novel, Dracula.

== Architecture ==
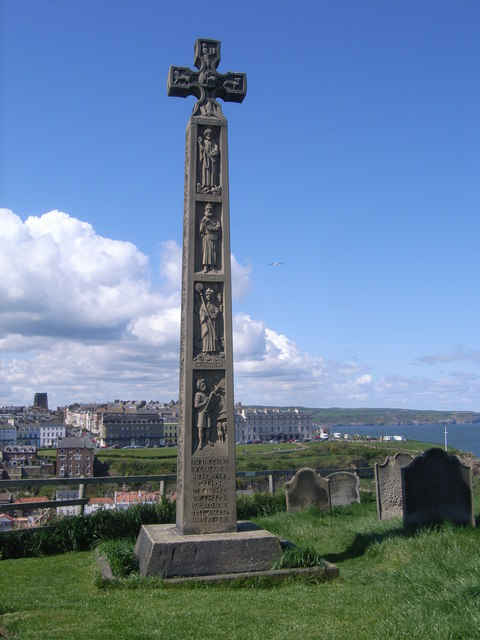
Caedmon's cross on the west side of the churchyard

A Norman church was built on the site around 1110 and added to and altered over the centuries. The tower and transepts are from the 12th and 13th centuries. The tower is square and crenellated, as are the walls.

One of the oldest parts of the church is the quire which has three round-headed windows at its east end. Its side walls originally had three bays with similar windows but have been altered. It has three aumbries, one with a small piscina. The nave has five bays and is contemporary with the quire, its south wall is much altered but three external buttresses remain. When the church was enlarged in 1818 most of the north wall was removed and replaced by columns to accommodate an aisle, four large square-headed windows were inserted on the south side, the south porch was built in 1823 and a north porch built in the new annexe. The ceilings over the nave are boarded with several skylights. The transept was built in the 13th century and has three altered lancet windows in its northern arm while its southern arm is considerably changed and its windows all replaced. A squint cuts through from the south transept to the quire.

The three-stage west tower has a squat appearance, its corners supported by flat buttresses and its embattled parapet is a 16th-century addition. Of its ring of eight bells, six are inscribed, "Whitby 1762 Lester and Pack of London fecit" and two were added in 1897.

=== Interior ===
Memorial to General Peregrine Lascelles (1685-1772)

The nave and transept have 19th-century galleries accessed by internal and external staircases and a three-decker pulpit which was installed in 1778 and altered in 1847. It retains its 18th-century box pews, some of which are inscribed, "For Strangers Only", and north of the chancel arch is a Jacobean pew. There is a monument to Sir Richard Cholmley who died in 1631.

The church includes a memorial to Lieutenant-General Peregrine Lascelles (1685-1772), who served in a number of 18th-century wars, including the Battle of Prestonpans in Scotland in 1745.

== Threat from cliff erosion ==
Two significant land slips due to broken drainage and torrential rain, the first occurring in November 2012, have placed the churchyard, and properties below the cliff, in significant jeopardy. Whitby town councillor Steve Smith stated that the church was in no danger, having been built on solid rock. Human remains have fallen onto the street below, and pathways on the cliff-side of the church have been closed.

== Popular culture ==
Bram Stoker used St Mary's Church graveyard as the setting for a scene in his novel, Dracula:

For a moment or two I could see nothing, as the shadow of a cloud obscured St. Mary's Church. Then as the cloud passed I could see the ruins of the Abbey coming into view; and as the edge of a narrow band of light as sharp as a sword-cut moved along, the church and churchyard became gradually visible... It seemed to me as though something dark stood behind the seat where the white figure shone, and bent over it. What it was, whether man or beast, I could not tell.

== See also ==
- Grade I listed buildings in North Yorkshire (district)
- Listed buildings in Whitby (central area - east)
