= Abbey House, Whitby =

Historic building in North Yorkshire, England

Abbey House
- The north wing, seen from the north, in 2009

- Location within North Yorkshire

General information
- Location: Whitby, North Yorkshire, England
- Coordinates: 54°29′15″N 0°36′31″W
- Year built: Medieval

Listed Building – Grade I
- Official name: The Abbey House
- Designated: 23 February 1954
- Reference no.: 1055872

Listed Building – Grade I
- Official name: Garden walls and gatepiers to the Abbey House
- Designated: 23 February 1954
- Reference no.: 1148375

Abbey House is a historic building in Whitby, a town in North Yorkshire, England.

The building appears to have been constructed in the medieval period, as accommodation for the abbot of Whitby Abbey. After the English Reformation, it was leased to the Cholmley family, who purchased it in 1555. Some sources suggest that at the time the house was built of wood and it was not rebuilt in stone until 1626, while others hold that the bulk of the building dates to the 1580s. In 1672, what is now the north wing was added by Sir Hugh Cholmeley, including a banqueting hall, and this section has since sometimes been called Cholmeley House. Most of the windows onto the courtyard thus created were altered to match the style of the new wing. A square forecourt was created in front of the new wing, now known as the Stone Garden. This contains a replica of the Borghese Gladiator, another replica of which was owned by the builder of the house.

In 1743 the family succeeded to the Wentworth estates and moved its main base to Howsham Hall. In 1775, the north wing was damaged during a storm, and was thereafter left roofless.

The house was altered over the centuries, and the inhabited section was extended around 1900 in the neo-Tudor style. In the early 20th century, the house was leased by the Co-operative Holidays Association, then in the 1930s it, along with the abbey, was acquired by the Ministry of Works. It was Grade I listed in 1954. Between 1998 and 2002, the ruined wing was re-roofed and converted into a visitor centre for the abbey, to a design by Stanton Williams. In 2007, the house was leased by the Youth Hostel Association, which moved its hostel from the neighbouring Abbey Stables.

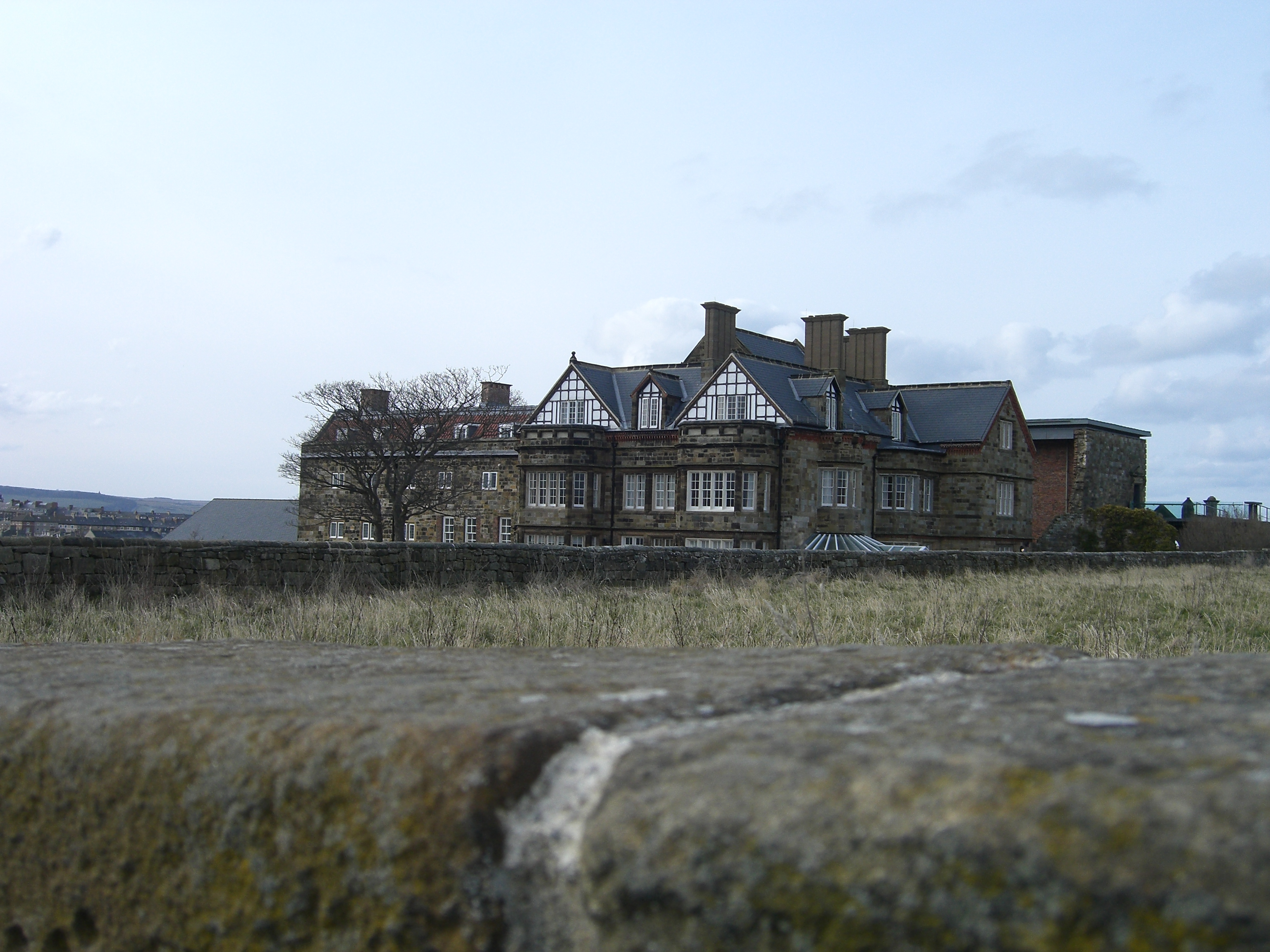
View from the southwest

The house is built of stone, the main part has three storeys and attics, a cornice and a parapet. The right wing projects at right angles, and has three storeys. Some windows are sashes and others are mullioned, all with a variety of surrounds. The south front has two storeys, eleven bays, and flanking quoins. The central bay projects slightly and contains a doorway with an eared architrave and Ionic columns. Above is a frieze and a cornice, and a window with an architrave flanked by Corinthian columns, over which is a broken pediment with foliage and swags. The other windows have architraves and cornices.

Inside, four rooms have 16th-century panelling, and there are two 16th-century staircases. The kitchen has two large stone fireplaces, and another room has two further stone fireplaces. One wall has a 12th-century column, which was probably moved from elsewhere. The visitor centre has a steel framework inserted within the old walls, which supports the upper floor and roof. On the south facade, it cantilevers out through a ruined section of wall, to support a metal, glass and timber screen.

At the entrance to the grounds of the house is a pair of 17th-century stone gate piers, one with a griffin crest. The flanking walls are in stone and incorporate 12th and 13th-century carved stonework. The piers and walls are collectively Grade I listed.

== See also ==
- Grade I listed buildings in North Yorkshire (district)
- Listed buildings in Whitby (central area - east)
