= White Horse & Griffin =

Historic building in Whitby, North Yorkshire, England

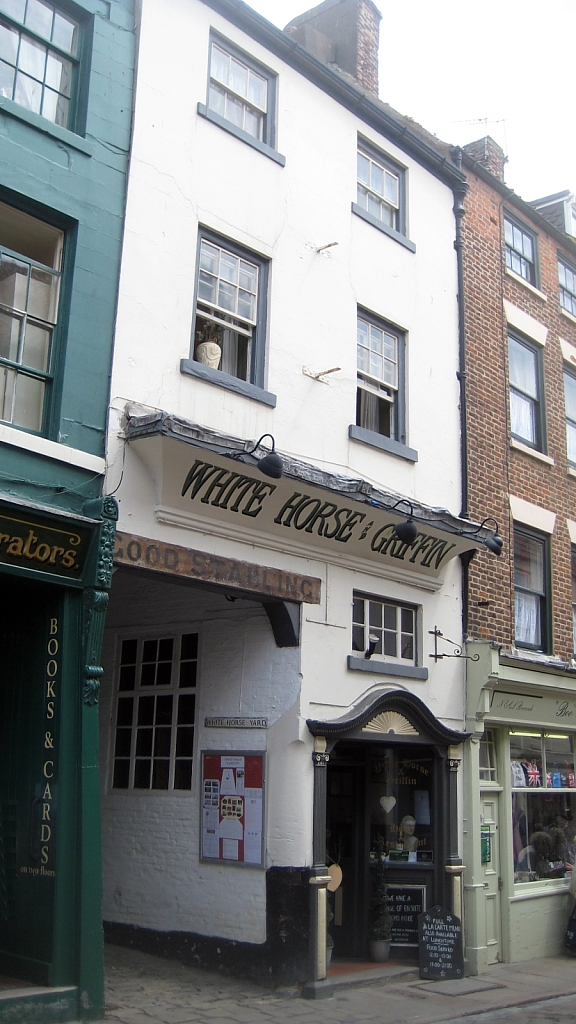
- The building in 2011

- Location within North Yorkshire

General information
- Location: Church Street, Whitby, North Yorkshire, England
- Coordinates: 54°29′15″N 0°36′42″W
- Year built: Late 18th century
- Renovated: 1982 (restored)

Website
- whitehorseandgriffin.com

Listed Building – Grade II
- Official name: Former White Horse Inn
- Designated: 4 December 1972
- Reference no.: 1148343

The White Horse & Griffin (officially listed as the former White Horse Inn) is a historic building on Church Street in Whitby, a town in North Yorkshire, England.

The building was constructed as an inn in 1681 for Hugh Cholmeley, although Historic England dates the current structure to the late 18th century. James Cook and William Scoresby hired crews from the inn. In 1788, the first stagecoach from Whitby to London ran from the inn. Charles Dickens visited and noted that there were oyster shell grottos in the yard. The inn closed in 1939, and the building was used as storage by local fishermen. The building was Grade II listed in 1972, and was restored in 1982, becoming a hotel and restaurant.

The building is rendered and has a cornice above the ground floor. There are three storeys and two bays. The ground floor has a passage entry on the left, and to the right is a doorway with reeded Ionic pilasters on plinths, and a curving dentiled pediment containing decoration. Above it is a small window, and the upper floors contain double-hung sash windows.

== See also ==
- Listed buildings in Whitby (central area - east)
