= Fascia (architecture) =

In architecture, a plain horizontal frieze or band

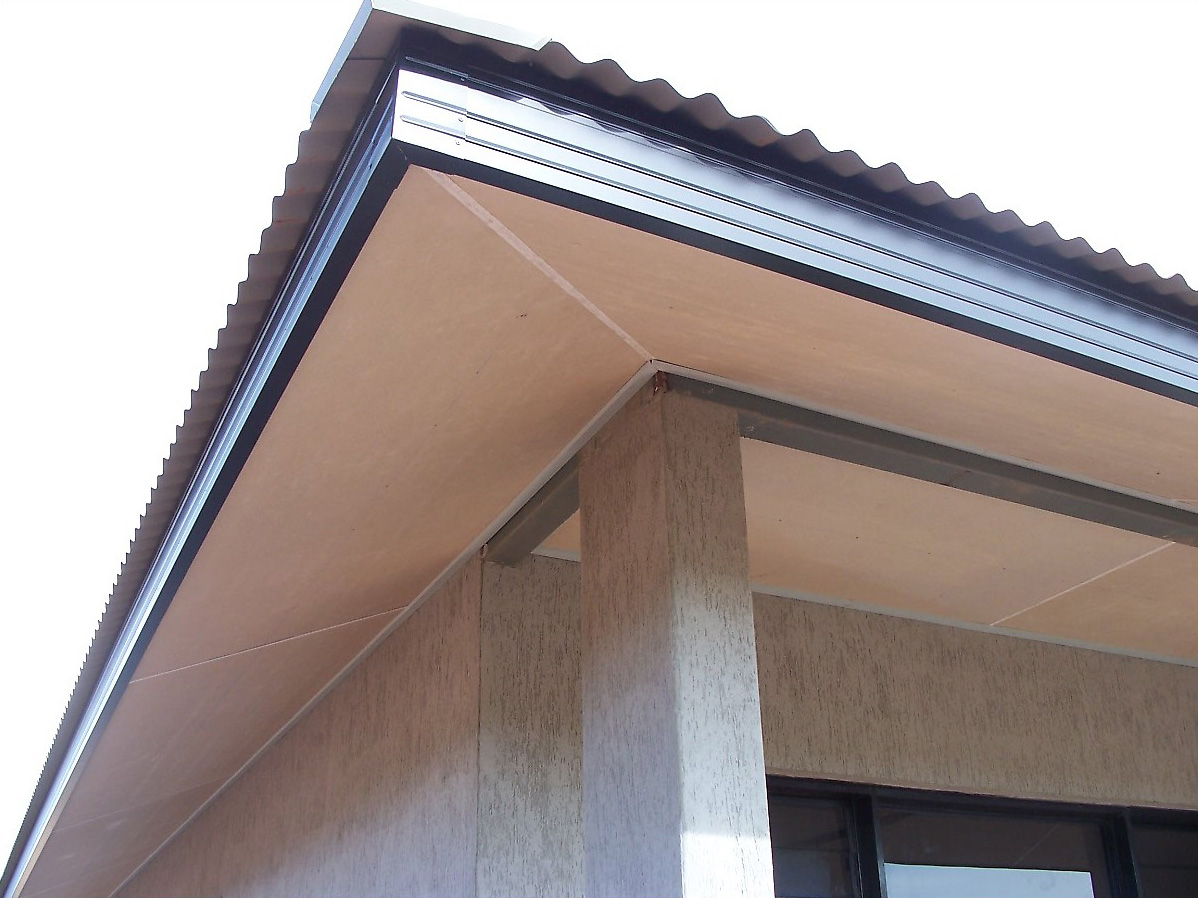
Roll formed metal fascias (the horizontally oriented metallic surface, with two "lines" along it, that is just below the corrugated roof edge, which overhangs the fascias by a few inches) on a house in Northern Australia. Portable roll forming machines make it possible to create long lengths on the building site, thus reducing joints. The eaves or soffit lining can be seen.

Fascia (/ˈfeɪʃə/) is an architectural term for a vertical frieze or band under a roof edge, or which forms the outer surface of a cornice, visible to an observer.

Typically consisting of a wooden board, unplasticized PVC (uPVC), or non-corrosive sheet metal, many of the non-domestic fascias made of stone form an ornately carved or pieced together cornice, in which case the term fascia is rarely used.

The word fascia derives from Latin fascia meaning "band, bandage, ribbon, swathe". The term is also used, although less commonly, for other such band-like surfaces like a wide, flat trim strip around a doorway, different and separate from the wall surface.

The horizontal "fascia board" that caps the end of rafters outside a building may be used to hold the rain gutter. The finished surface below the fascia and rafters is called the soffit or eave.

In classical architecture, the fascia is the plain, wide band (or bands) that make up the architrave section of the entablature, directly above the columns. The guttae or drip edge was mounted on the fascia in the Doric order, below the triglyph. The term fascia can also refer to the flat strip below the cymatium.

== See also ==
- Bargeboard, a board fastened to a projecting gable
- Eaves, a roof projection beyond the line of a building
- Soffit, the surface or surfaces, often structural under a roof projection. The term used in other structures such as for the underside of an arch.
