= Whitby Abbey =

Abbey in Whitby, North Yorkshire, England

- Interactive map of Whitby Abbey

Monastery information
- Order: Benedictine
- Established: 657 AD
- Disestablished: 1538
- Diocese: Diocese of York

People
- Founders: 1. Oswiu; 2. Prior Reinfrid

Site
- Location: Whitby, North Yorkshire, England
- Coordinates: 54.489°N 0.608°W
- Visible remains: substantial
- Public access: yes

Whitby Abbey was a 7th-century Christian monastery that later became a Benedictine abbey. The abbey church was situated overlooking the North Sea on the East Cliff above Whitby in North Yorkshire, England, a centre of the medieval Northumbrian kingdom. The abbey and its possessions were confiscated by the crown under Henry VIII during the dissolution of the monasteries between 1536 and 1545.

Since that time, the ruins of the abbey have continued to be used by sailors as a landmark at the headland. Since the 20th century, the substantial ruins of the church have been declared a Grade I Listed building and are in the care of English Heritage. The site museum is housed in Cholmley House, a 17th-century banqueting hall repurposed by design studio Stanton Williams in 2002.

== Streoneshalh ==
The monastery was first founded in AD 657 by Oswy, King of Northumbria, as Streoneshalh, the older name for Whitby. He appointed Lady Hilda, abbess of Hartlepool Abbey and grand-niece of Edwin, the first Christian king of Northumbria, as founding abbess.

The double monastery of monks and nuns was home (614–680) to the great Northumbrian poet Cædmon.

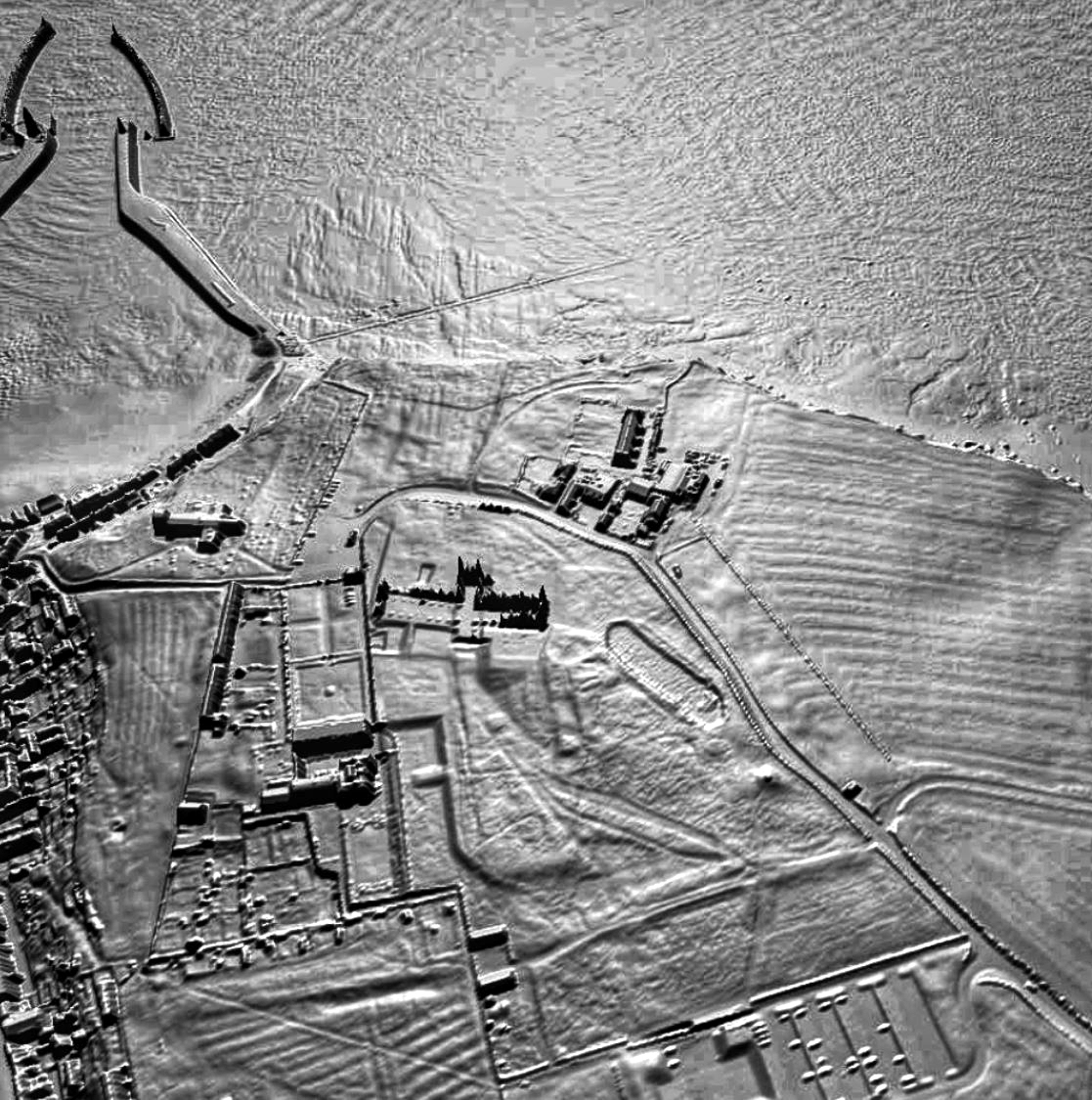
A lidar view of Whitby Abbey and surrounding archaeological residues.

In 664, the Synod of Whitby took place at the monastery to resolve the question of whether the Northumbrian church would adopt and follow the Easter dating of Iona, the 84-year cycle which had been previously used in Rome and on the continent, or the new 19-year cycle which had recently been adopted at Rome. There was also discussion of what kind of tonsure clergy and monks should use. The decision, with the support of King Oswy, was for adopting the newer Roman Easter calculation, as was used in other English kingdoms to the south.

Streoneshalh monastery was laid to waste by Danes in successive raids between 867 and 870 under Ingwar and Ubba, and remained desolate for more than 200 years. A locality named 'Prestebi' was recorded in the Domesday Book of 1086, which may be a sign that religious life was revived in some form after the Danish raids. 'Witebi' (Whitby) is also mentioned. Prestebi, from Old Norse, means a habitation of priests. The old monastery given to Reinfrid comprised about 40 ruined monasteria vel oratoria, similar to Irish monastic ruins with numerous chapels and cells.

== Whitby ==
Reinfrid, a soldier of William the Conqueror, became a monk and travelled to Streoneshalh, which was then known as Prestebi or Hwitebi, from Old Norse, meaning "White settlement". He approached William de Percy for a grant of land, who gave him the ruined monastery of St. Peter with two carucates of land, to found a new monastery. Serlo de Percy, the founder's brother, joined Reinfrid at the new monastery, which followed the Benedictine rule. The greater part of de Percy's building was pulled down and the monastery was rebuilt on a larger scale in the 1220s.

The Benedictine abbey thrived for centuries as a centre of learning. This second monastery was destroyed by Henry VIII in 1540 during the Dissolution of the Monasteries. The abbey was bought by Sir Richard Cholmley. It remained in the Cholmley family and their descendants, the Strickland family. The Strickland family passed it to the UK government in 1920. The ruins are now owned and maintained by English Heritage.

In December 1914, Whitby Abbey was shelled by the German battlecruisers Von der Tann and Derfflinger, whose crew "were aiming for the Coastguard Station on the end of the headland." Scarborough and Hartlepool were also attacked. The abbey buildings sustained considerable damage during the ten-minute attack.

== Abbey possessions ==
The original gift of William de Percy included the monastery of St. Peter at Streoneshalch, and the town and Port of Whitby, with its parish church of St Mary and six dependent chapels at Fyling, Hawsker, Sneaton, Ugglebarnby, Dunsley, and Aislaby; five mills including Ruswarp; the village of Hackness with two mills and the parish church of St. Mary; and the church of St Peter at Hackness, "where our monks served God, died, and were buried," and various other gifts enumerated in the Memorial in the abbot's book.

== Priors and abbots ==
The first prior of the reestablished monastery, Reinfrid, ruled for many years before being killed in an accident. He was buried at St Peter's at Hackness, now in North Yorkshire. He was succeeded as prior by Serlo de Percy.

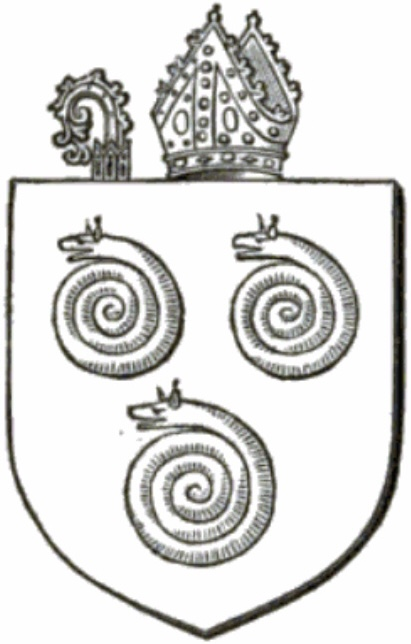
The arms of Whitby Abbey.

== Coat of arms ==
The abbey's coat of arms consisted of three coiled snakes or "snake-stones", representing ammonite fossils with serpents' heads, colored red on a blue field. The shield's crest consisted of a mitre and the head of a crosier, both in gold.

== Dracula ==
Bram Stoker's 1897 novel Dracula featured Count Dracula as a creature resembling a large dog which came ashore at the headland and ran up the 199 steps to the graveyard of St Mary's Church in the shadow of the Whitby Abbey ruins. The abbey is also described in Mina Harker's diary in the novel:

Right over the town is the ruin of Whitby Abbey, which was sacked by the Danes, and which is the scene of part of Marmion, where the girl was built up in the wall. It is a most noble ruin, of immense size, and full of beautiful and romantic bits; there is a legend that a white lady is seen in one of the windows.

== Gallery ==
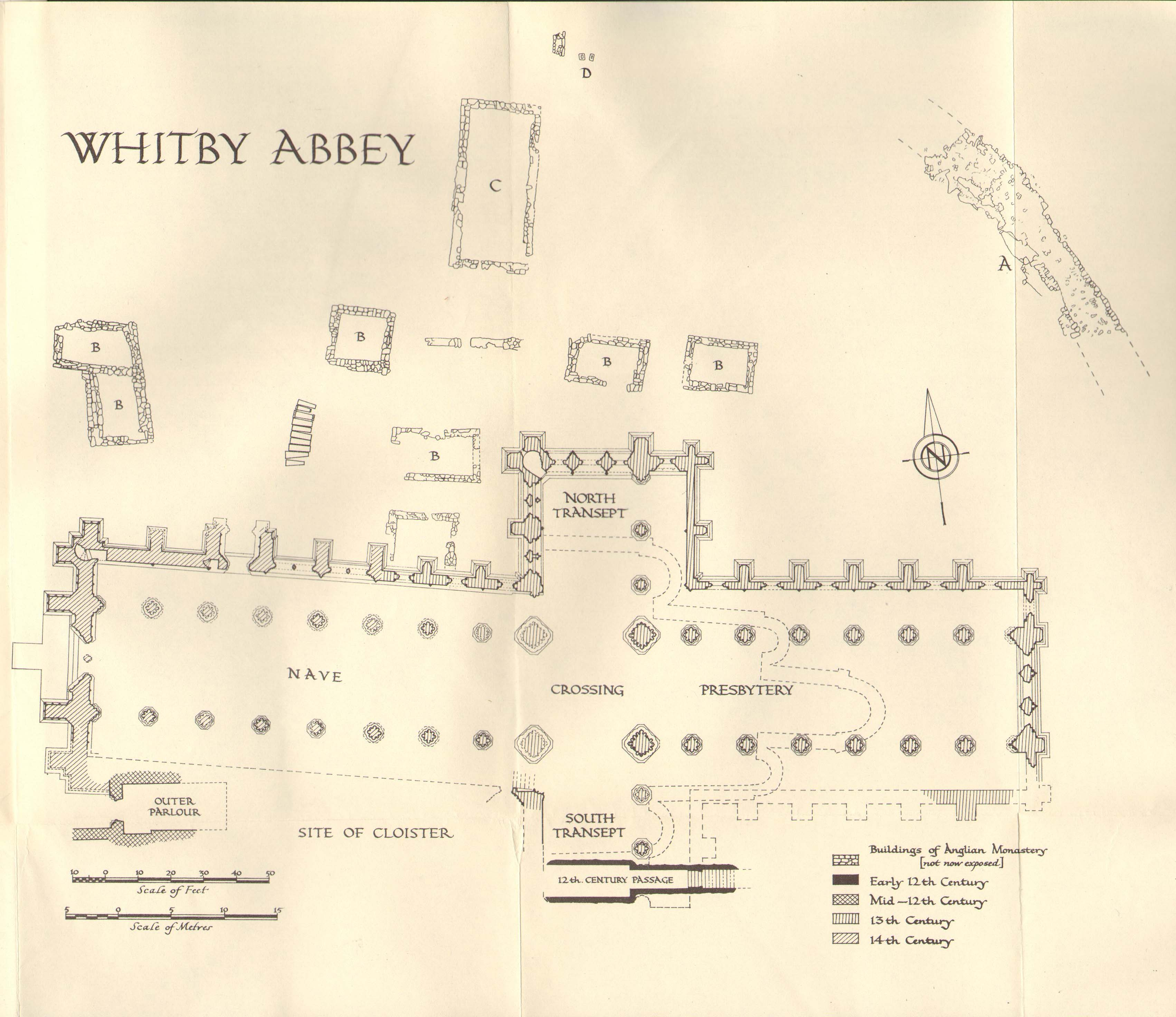
Plan of Whitby Abbey showing the various periods of building

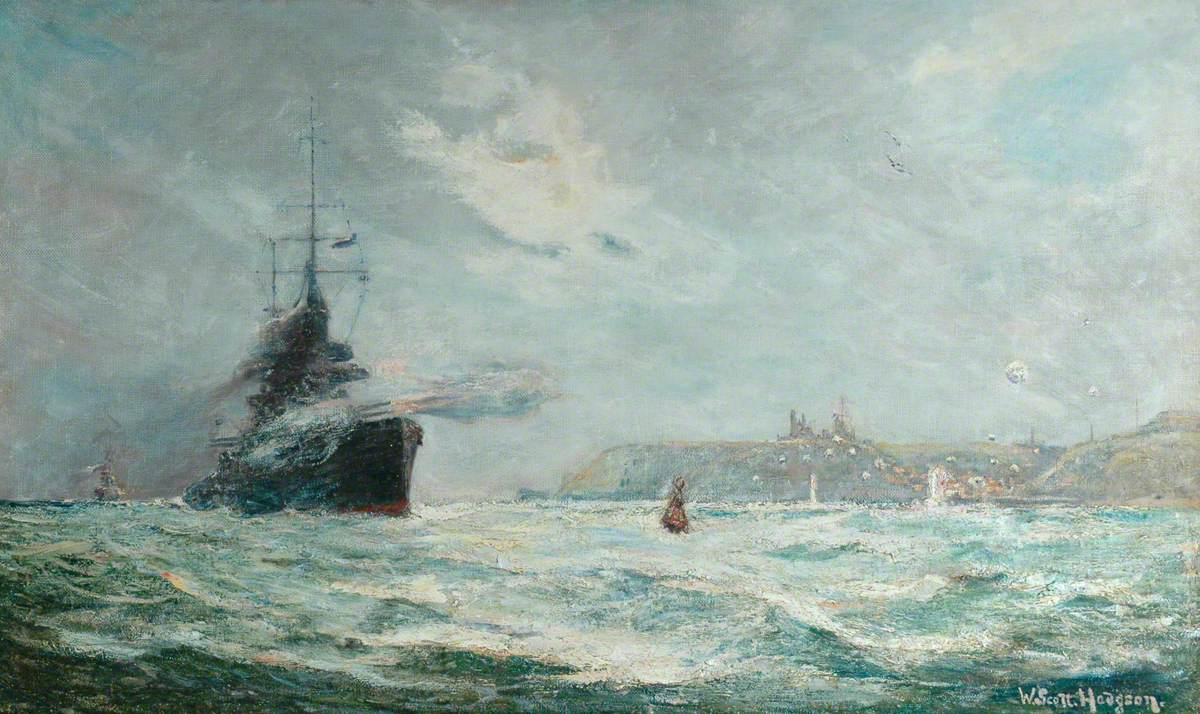
The Bombardment of Whitby, 16 December 1914, by William Scott Hodgson.

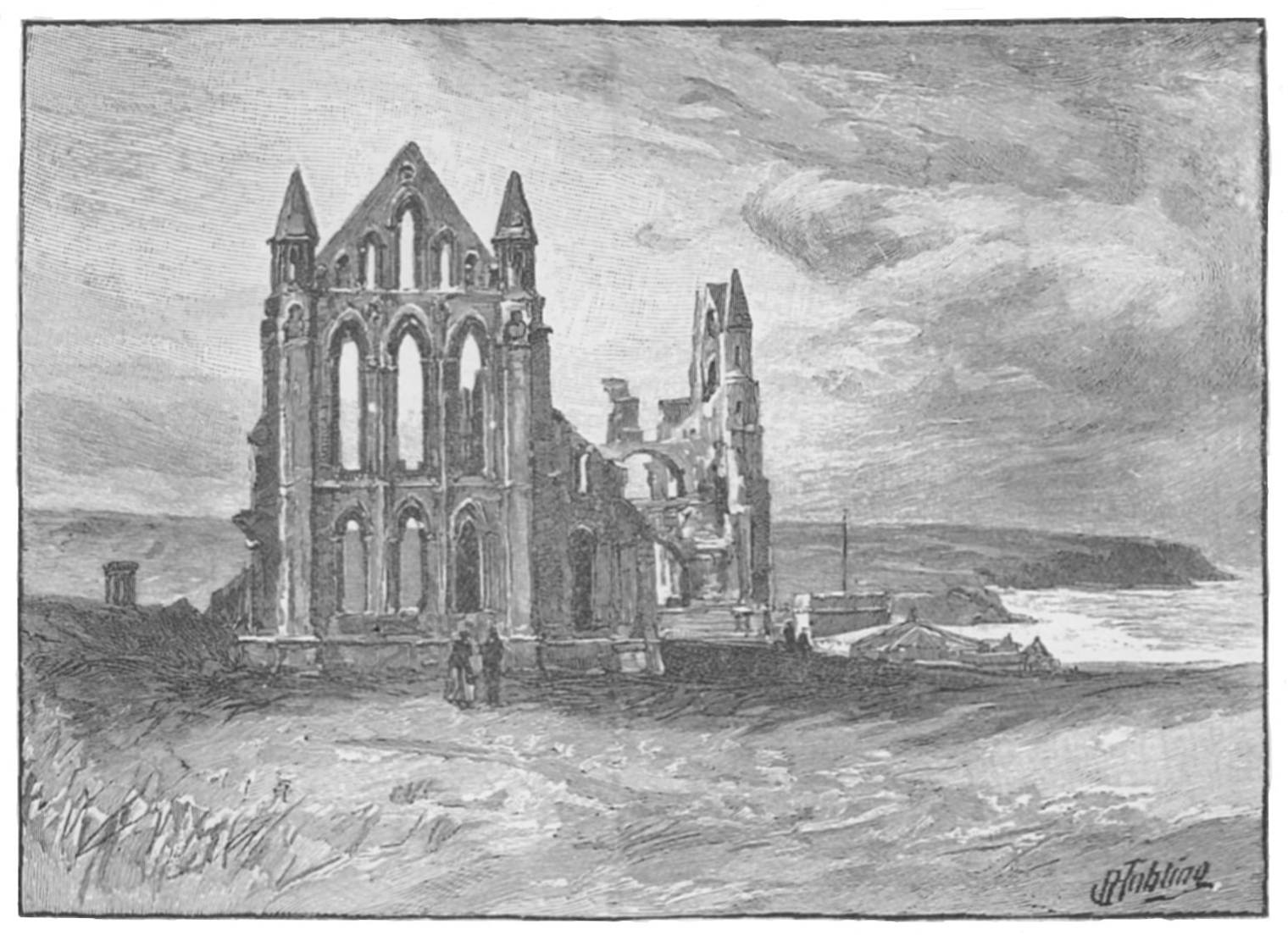
The ruins of Whitby Abbey in a 1909 book illustration

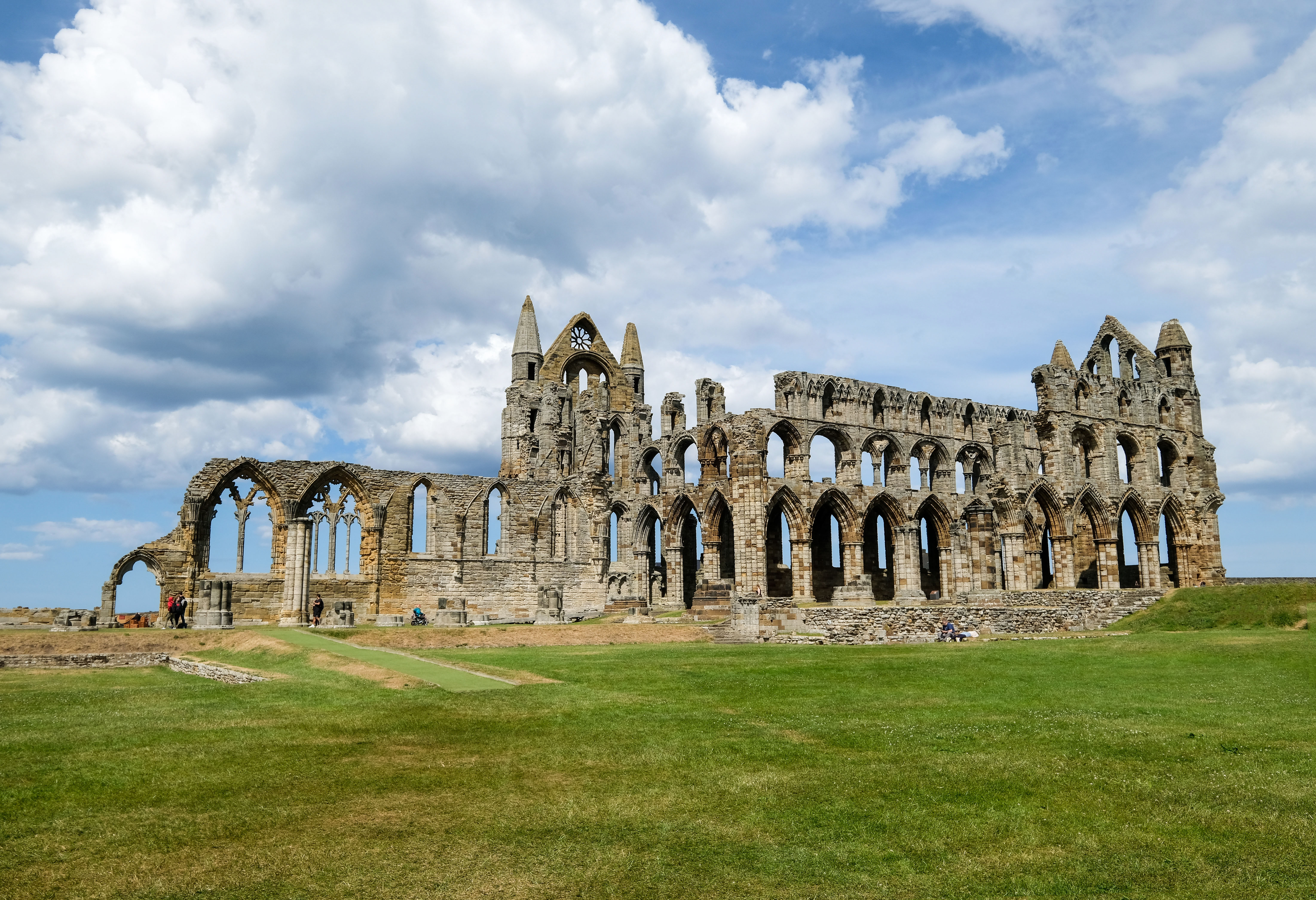
General view of the ruins

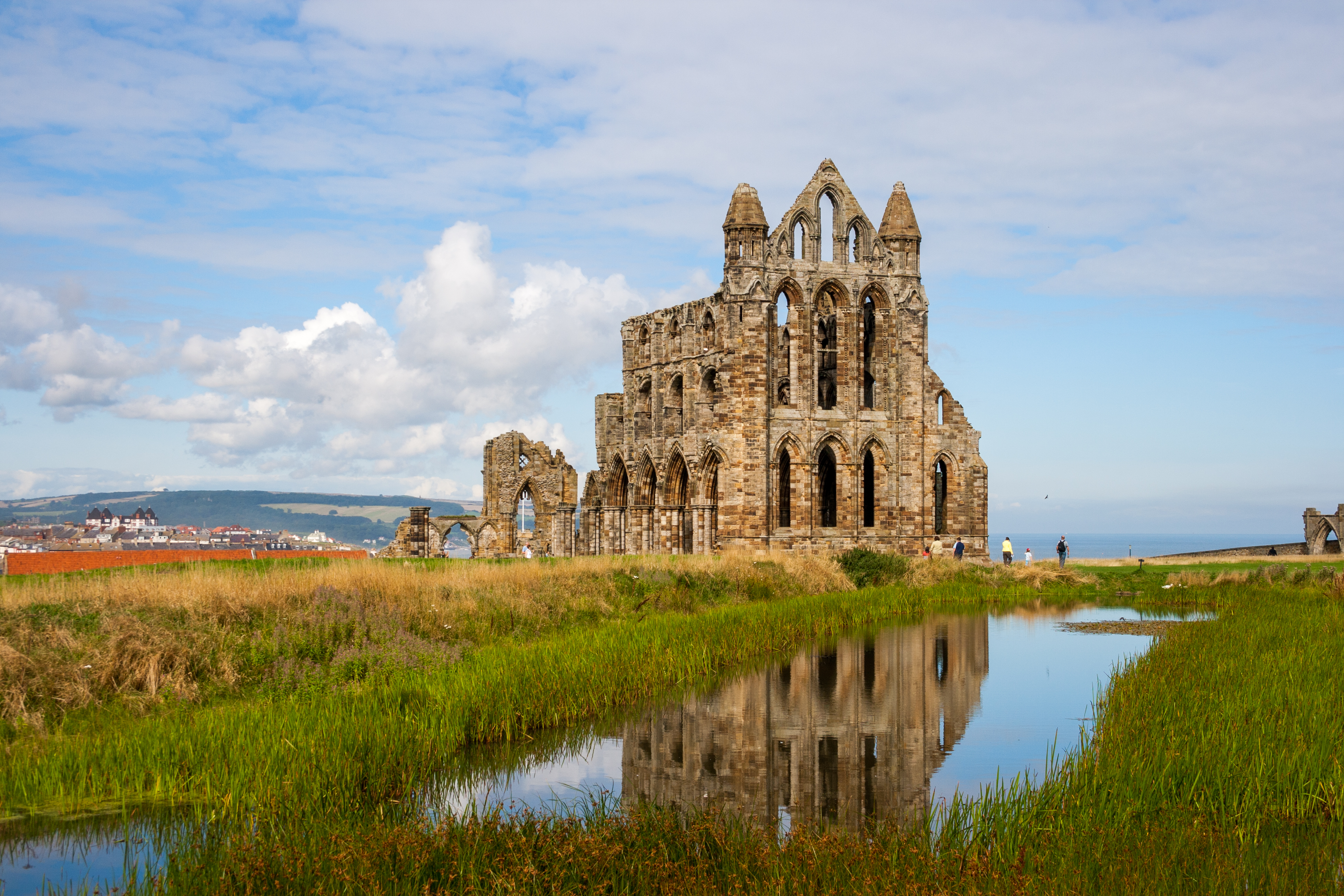
Whitby abbey with reflection

Side view of the nave and choir

Choir

The west front of the abbey is typical 14th century with lancett windows.

== Notable burials ==
- Hilda of Whitby
- Bosa of York
- Edwin of Deira, King of Deira and Bernicia, and a Saint
- Oswiu of Northumbria, a King of Bernicia
- Eahlfrith, widow of King Oswiu and Abbess of Whitby
- Ælfflæd of Whitby, daughter of Oswiu and Eanflæd, also an Abbess of Whitby
- Joscelin of Louvain
- Sir William de Percy, 1st Baron Percy (died c. 1096), Norman baron and Crusader
- Sir Richard de Percy, 5th Baron Percy (1166–1243), signatory to Magna Carta

== See also ==
- Grade I listed buildings in North Yorkshire (district)
- Listed buildings in Whitby (central area - east)
