= Whitby Weighing Machine House =

Listed building in North Yorkshire, England

- Interactive map of the Whitby Weighing Machine House area

General information
- Status: Derelict
- Location: Whitby, North Yorkshire, England
- Coordinates: 54.475°N 0.615°W
- Ordnance Survey: NZ898098
- Opened: c. 1835–1836
- Closed: c. 1845–1847

Design and construction
- Engineer: John Bolton

Listed Building – Grade II
- Feature: Weighing Machine House at NGR NZ 8985 0981
- Designated: 7 August 1990
- Reference no.: 1239953

The Whitby Weighing Machine House is a grade II listed structure that is south of Whitby, North Yorkshire, England, between the Esk Valley line and the River Esk. The site was also where the original railway line allowed passengers to change into carriages pulled by horses on local roads, acting as the original railway terminus. The building is still largely extant, but mostly derelict, and is one of the few original Whitby and Pickering Railway (W&PR) buildings to still exist.

== History ==
The weighing machine house (WMH) was built c. 1835, (Note: Sources disagree on the opening date of the Weighing Machine House. Whilst the entire railway to Pickering was opened in May 1836, the section from Whitby to Grosmont was opened in June 1835, although work had started on the railway two years earlier.) before the whole track was completed to Pickering, as it served stone brought down the Esk Valley, providing revenue for the fledgling railway. Contemporary pictures of the building show a view looking north with Whitby Abbey on a hill in the distance. The image has two tracks, with what is believed to be the running track on the left, and the track for the weighing machine on the right adjacent to the building (see external links). The weighing house operative also acted as a toll-keeper for foot traffic – unlike turnpikes which afforded free use to those on foot, the railway would charge for its use and the WMH had gates which were closed against the line to prevent non-payment of tolls.

The weighing machine house was also the point of embarkation and disembarkation of passengers between carriages on rails, and carriages on roads, taking passengers the 0.5-mile (0.8 km) between the weighing house and Whitby town centre (and vice-versa). Stones quarried in Aislaby and Grosmont were railed down the line to the WMH, and weighed before being exported from Whitby by ship; early railways and canals were not actually carriers of goods themselves, they charged others for use of the railway to transport their goods, so a weighing house provided the maximum revenue for the railway company. When the first railway companies appeared, their bills through Parliament were treated in the same way as turnpike roads, in that anyone could use the railway line, as long as they paid monies for carriage of their goods to the railway company. (Note: The Whitby and Pickering Railway Act 1833 states "... and be it further enacted, That all persons shall have free liberty to pass along and upon and to use and employ the said railway with carriages properly constructed as by this Act directed, upon payment of such rates and tolls as shall be demanded by the said company...")

The weighing machine apparatus was installed underneath the track, and acted a lever which had a counterbalanced weight inside the building. The position of the weighing machine house was just to the south of the Whitby Stone Company's quay, which they used for exporting the stone, and the building itself is believed to be made from stone quarried at Aislaby. The front of the WMH where it faced onto the railway track has a wide, low front window so that the operative could view the load being weighed.

The building was designed by Frederick Swanwick (the engineer who built the W&PR deputising for George Stephenson), but was built by John Bolton, an architect who operated out of Whitby, and the weighing machine apparatus was supplied by Kitchens of Warrington. The Weighing Machine House is believed to have fallen out of use between 1845 and 1847 when the Y&NMR converted the line into heavy rail use, with weighing of goods either not necessary, or, an alternative system was used.

The building was grade II listed in 1990, though the citation notes that the building is in a "ruinous state". (Note: The Historic England citation also states that the building was built for the Scarborough and Whitby Railway Company in 1835. The Scarborough and Whitby Railway did not pass the site, leaving Whitby Town railway station at Bog Hall Junction (further north) and the company was not incorporated until 1871.) The site is publicly accessible from a path that parallels the riverbank starting at the southern end of the Port of Whitby. It is one of the few original W&PR buildings to still exist (the 1836 Grosmont Tunnel being another example); the railway was built largely without station infrastructure as passengers boarded horse-drawn coaches on rails at designated stops, and so traditional stations were not provided. Most other W&PR structures were demolished or replaced when the York & North Midland Railway rebuilt the line in the 1840s/1850s for heavy railway traffic.
