= Aislaby Quarry =

Sandstone quarry in North Yorkshire, England

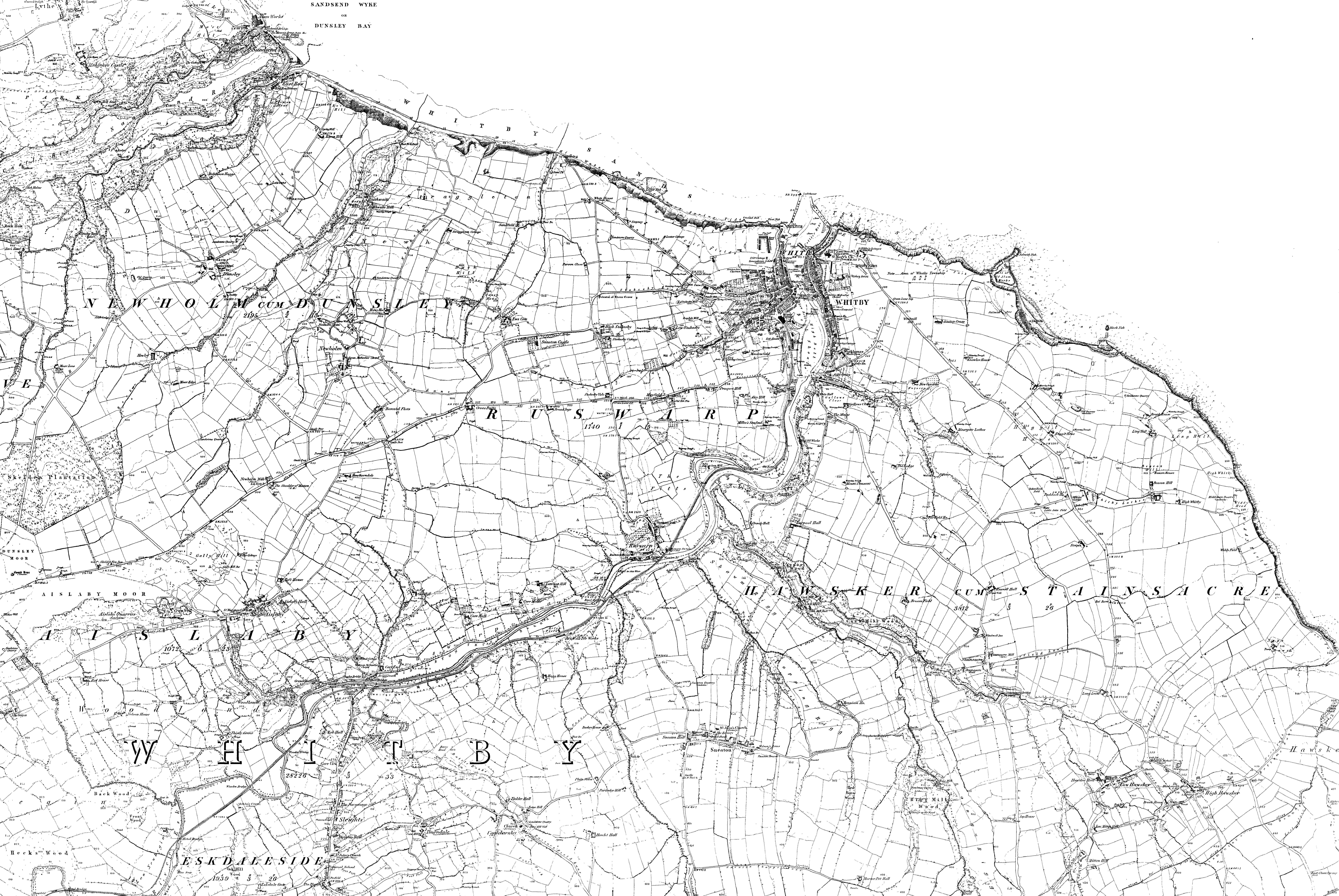
- OS Map 1848-1857; Aislaby is lower middle left

- Location within North Yorkshire

Location
- Location: Aislaby, North Yorkshire, England; 54.467°N 0.689°W

Production
- Products: Sandstone

Aislaby Quarry is a sandstone quarry in the village of Aislaby, near to Whitby in North Yorkshire, England. The quarry produces sandstone which has been exported through Whitby to London and South East England.

== History ==
The quarry workings at Aislaby are 4 miles (6.4 km) west of Whitby, and were known to have been in existence by the 11th century, as the majority of Whitby Abbey was constructed of stone quarried from the area. The West and East Piers at Whitby were faced with 6 tonnes (6.6 tons) blocks of Aislaby stone.

Besides being used for building purposes, some of the stone from Aislaby was used in decorative work such as crosses used in churches. Examples of this stone worked decoratively have been found in churches the area including Whitby Abbey, Lythe, Church of St Mary, Lastingham, and Hovingham. The Easby Cross, which dates to the early 9th century, has been matched to the same "medium-grained deltaic sandstone traditionally produced in the Aislaby quarries of Eskdale, near Whitby". It is theorised that pack horses took sections of the stone west from Aislaby to the valley of the River Swale, but it is unknown who paid for the cross.

In May 2002, the quarry was re-opened to allow new stone to be quarried to provide repairs for structures which used Aislaby Stone in the first place, such as the east pier at Scarborough. It was again reopened in the 2010s, specifically to supply stone for a renovation programme on the East and West Piers at Whitby. The quarry was registered in 2020 as Eskdale stone, working sandstone from the Saltwick and Cloughton formations of Jurassic sandstone.

== Notable structures ==
The structures listed below were built with stone quarried at Aislaby (not all structures are entirely of Aislaby stone);

- Admiralty Pier, Dover
- The new Library, Cambridge University
- St Margaret's Church, Aislaby
- Covent Garden
- Easby Cross
- Grinkle Park, Easington
- Guisborough Priory
- Houghton Hall, King's Lynn, the stone was transported to King's Lynn from Whitby by sea
- London Bridge
- Ramsgate Pier
- St Gregory's Minster, Kirkdale (assumed)
- Scarborough North Pier
- Strand Bridge (original Waterloo Bridge)
- Whitby Abbey
- Whitby East Pier
- Whitby West Pier
- Whitby Town Hall
