= Pond House =

Pond House may refer to:

- Pond House, Aislaby, a historic building in North Yorkshire, in England
- A racehorse training facility made famous by trainer Martin Pipe
- A track on the St. Etienne album I've Been Trying to Tell You
