= Woodlands Hall =

School building in Aislaby, North Yorkshire, England

Coordinates: 54°27′37″N 0°40′22″W

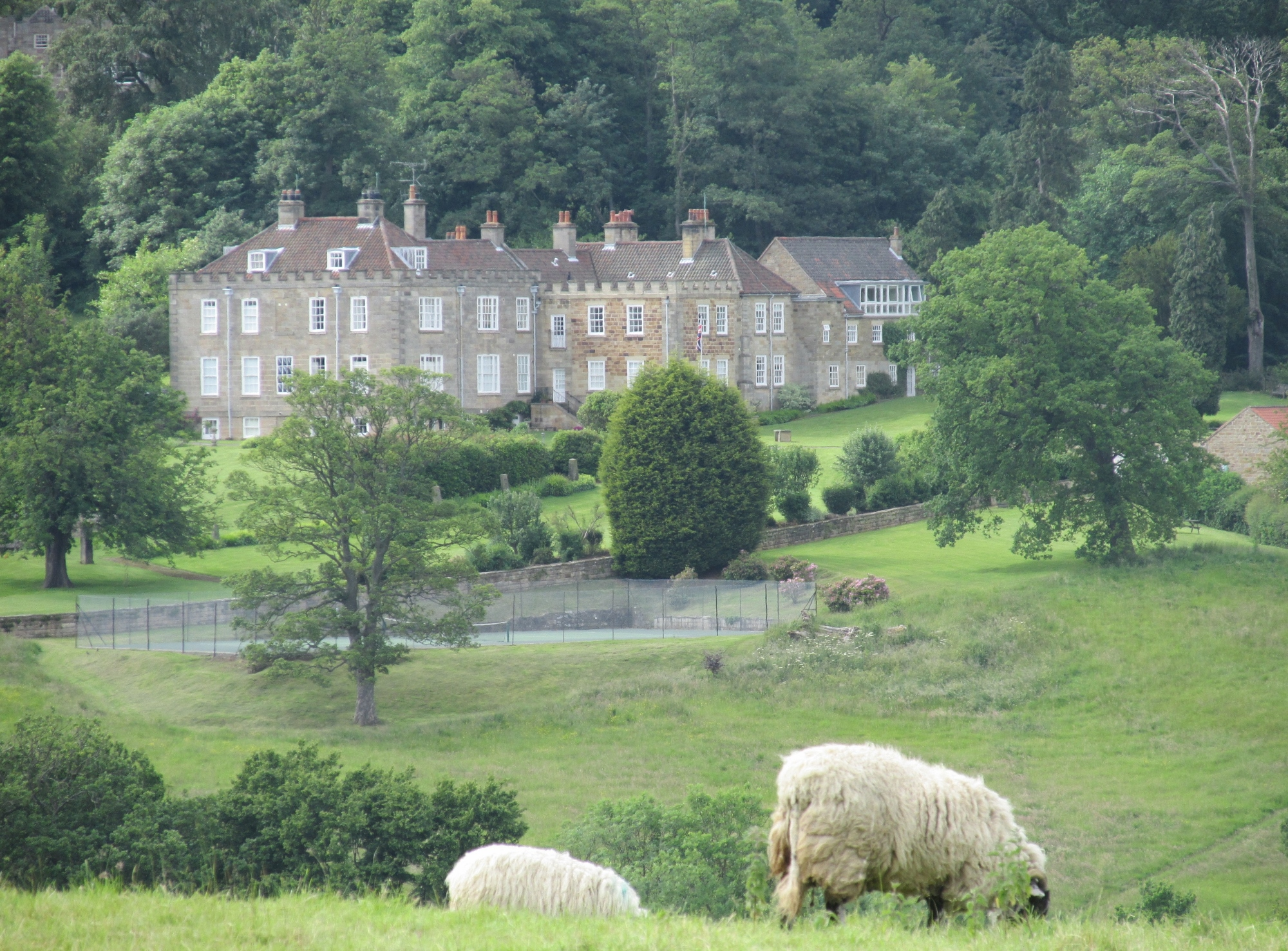
The building, in 2014

Woodlands Hall is a historic house in Aislaby, a village near Whitby in North Yorkshire, in England.

The house was built for Henry Walker Yeoman in the late 18th century. Yeoman also laid out a picturesque landscape around the house. Yeoman died in 1800, following which the house was let to tenants. In 1901, the house was inherited by five sisters in the Yeoman family. They developed the gardens, and regularly opened them to the public. They also arranged for the house to be remodelled, the work being undertaken from 1919 to 1921, to designs by Walter Brierley. This remodelling included extensions on the north side of the house. The house was Grade II* listed in 1952.

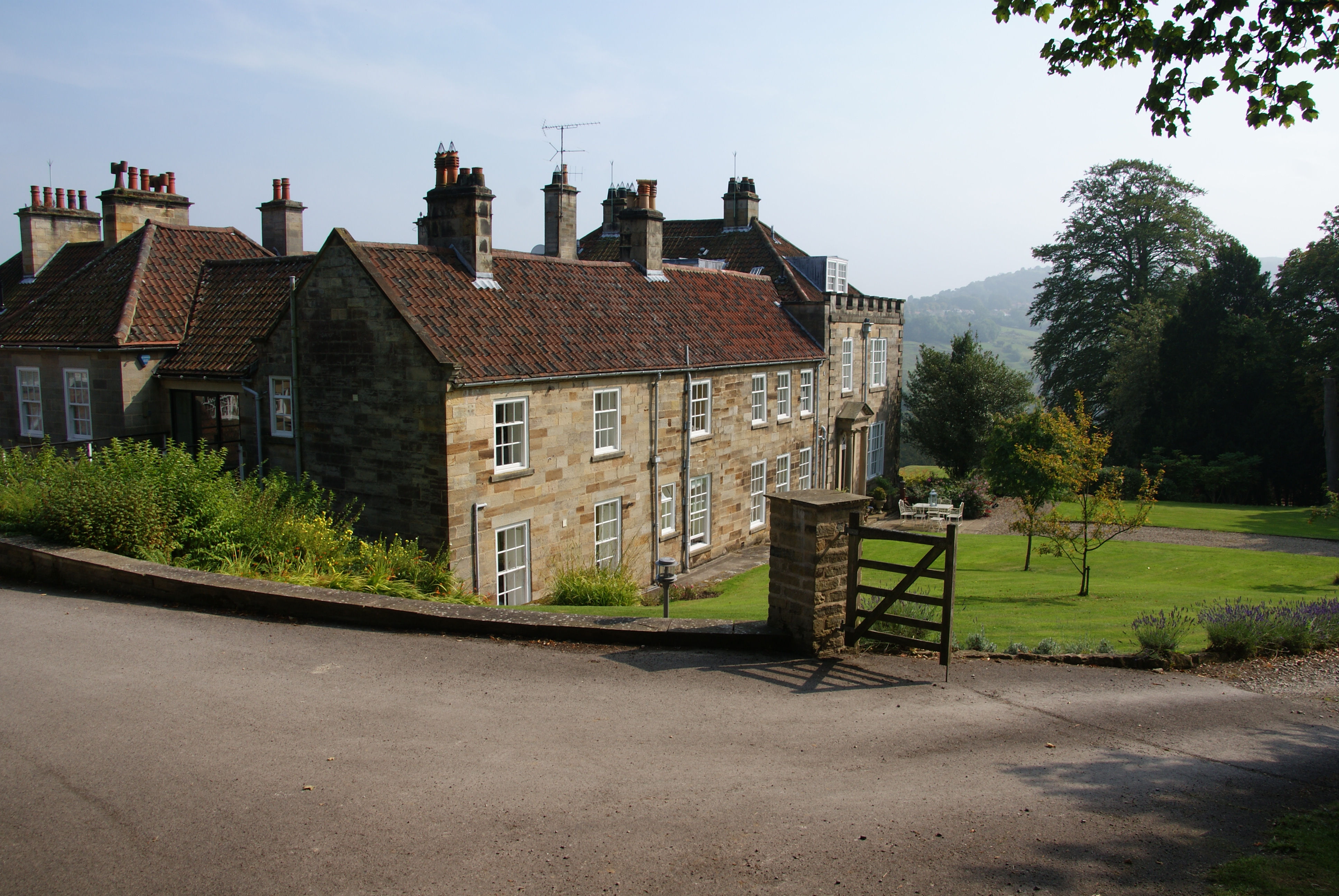
Rear of the building, showing work by Brierley, in 2014

In 1958, the house was sold and became St Hilda's Preparatory School. The school undertook further alterations in 1960, including the addition of a dining room. The school closed in 1988 and the building became a nursing home, but in 1999 it was converted into 14 apartments.

The house is built of stone, and has two storeys and an attic. It is two bays wide and five bays long, and has a long domestic wing to the left of the main house. Inside, many original features survive, including plasterwork and doors. The main staircase is curved in an oval stairwell.

== See also ==
- Listed buildings in Aislaby, Scarborough
