= Listed buildings in Lastingham =

Lastingham is a civil parish in the county of North Yorkshire, England. It contains 15 listed buildings that are recorded in the National Heritage List for England. Of these, one is listed at Grade I, the highest of the three grades, and the others are at Grade II, the lowest grade. The parish contains the village of Lastingham and the surrounding countryside. The listed buildings include houses, a church and a headstone in the churchyard, three public fountains known as "holy wells", two bridges, a mill, miller's house and stable range, a wayside cross and a telephone kiosk.

== Key ==
Grade	Criteria
I	Buildings of exceptional interest, sometimes considered to be internationally important
II	Buildings of national importance and special interest

== Buildings ==
Name and location	Photograph	Date	Notes	Grade
St Mary's Church; 54.30451°N 0.88259°W		1078	The church has been altered and extended through the centuries, and was restored in 1879 by J. L. Pearson. It is built in sandstone with lead roofs, and consists of a nave with a clerestory, north and south aisles, a south porch, a chancel with an apse, and a west tower. Also in the church is a crypt which consists of a nave with aisles, a chancel and an apse. The tower has two stages, a double-chamfered plinth, diagonal buttresses, a two-light west window, a clock face, paired bell openings with hood moulds, moulded string courses, an embattled parapet, and a saddleback roof.	I
St Cedd's House; 54.30468°N 0.88064°W	—	Mid 18th century	A house with a carriage shed incorporated into the house, it is in sandstone, with a coved eaves course, and a pantile roof with gable copings and shaped kneelers. There are two storeys, three bays, a single-storey single-bay extension to the right, and a rear oushut. The doorway has a fanlight and an open pediment, and is flanked by bow windows. In the upper floor are sash windows with lintels and triple keystones. The extension contains a tripartite segmental-arched window with an ogee head.	II
St Chad's Well; 54.30526°N 0.88025°W		18th century (probable)	The public fountain is in sandstone. It consists of a rectangular recess set into a wall, and has a semicircular arch under a shallow gabled lintel, on plain jambs with imposts. In the centre of the lintel is a shallow recessed inscribed panel. Inside, there is an iron pump and stone trough.	II
St Ovin's Well; 54.30427°N 0.88025°W		18th century (probable)	The public fountain is in sandstone. It consists of a rectangular recess set into a wall, with a segmentally-arched rebated opening under a shallow gabled lintel on plain jambs.	II
Home Farmhouse; 54.30416°N 0.88021°W	—	Late 18th century	The house is in sandstone, with limestone quoins, and a pantile roof with gable copings and shaped kneelers. There are two storeys and three bays, and the gable end faces the street. On the front is a porch and a doorway with a fanlight, and the windows are a mix of casements, and horizontally-sliding sashes.	II
The Old Mill; 54.30494°N 0.88175°W	—	Late 18th century	A mill and miller's house in sandstone, with quoins and pantile roofs. The house has two storeys and two bays. It has a latticed porch with a finial, horizontally-sliding sash windows, a stepped eaves course, and coped gables with shaped kneelers. The mill has one storey and a loft, three bays, and a single-storey wheel chamber on the left. It contains an iron wheel pit and a wooden waterwheel.	II
Vicarage; 54.30510°N 0.88390°W	—	1777	The vicarage was largely rebuilt in 1829 and later enlarged. It is in sandstone, with quoins, and a pantile roof with coped gables and plain kneelers. There are two storeys and five bays, and a rear outshut. On the front is a gabled porch, and a doorway with a chamfered quoined surround, a Tudor arch, an initialled and dated lintel and a hood mould. To its left is a French window and a canted bay window, above the doorway is a mullioned window, and the other windows are sashes with wedge lintels.	II
Headstone; 54.30441°N 0.88237°W	—	1779	The headstone is in the churchyard of St Mary's Church to the southeast of the church, and is to the memory of Thomas Flunders. It is a rectangular stone with a shaped head. On the east face is a carved cherub's head and a panel with an inscription, and on the west face is a carved doorway.	II
Askew Bridge; 54.29788°N 0.85875°W		Late 18th to early 19th century	The bridge carries Birk Head Lane over Lasingham Beck. It is in sandstone and consists of a single circular arch with voussoirs. The bridge has a raised band, and a plain parapet with flat coping.	II
Jacksons Bridge; 54.30360°N 0.88038°W		Late 18th to early 19th century	The bridge carries Low Street over Ellers Beck. It is in stone and consists of a single semicircular arch of voussoirs. There is a raised band, and a plain parapet with cambered coping. The parapet is swept out at each end, and terminates in square flat-topped piers with imposts. In the parapet is a recessed inscribed plaque.	II
Ana Cross; 54.33486°N 0.88699°W		Early 19th century	A wayside cross in a prominent location on a hill, it is in gritstone, and consists of a cross with a square section, on a rectangular base of two massive stones. The cross is about 3 metres (9.8 ft) high, and the head is cut from a single separate block.	II
Mount Pleasant Farmhouse; 54.30431°N 0.88009°W		Early 19th century	The house is in sandstone, with a stepped eaves course, and a pantile roof with gable copings and shaped kneelers. There are two storeys and three bays, and a rear service wing on the right. The doorway is approached by steps, and the windows are horizontally-sliding sashes.	II
Stable block, The Old Mill; 54.30506°N 0.88166°W	—	Early to mid 19th century	The stables and carriage shed with a loft above are in sandstone with a pantile roof. The central bay is gabled and has one storey and a loft, and it is flanked by single-storey bays. It contains doorways and a lifting door.	II
St Cedd's Well; 54.30455°N 0.88095°W		19th century	A public fountain made by re-using 12th century stone from Rosedale Abbey. It is in sandstone and has a square plan. There is a pointed cusped canopy raised to form a flat lintel with an inscription, on colonettes with voluted cushion capitals. It has a flat cornice and a stepped cap ending in a moulded pedestal carrying an iron cross. Inside there is a lion's head pump and a tap above, and an inscribed wooden panel.	II
Telephone kiosk 54.30434°N 0.88037°W		1935	The K6 type telephone kiosk in Main Street was designed by Giles Gilbert Scott. Constructed in cast iron with a square plan and a dome, it has three unperforated crowns in the top panels.	II
