= Piers of Whitby =

Piers in Yorkshire, England

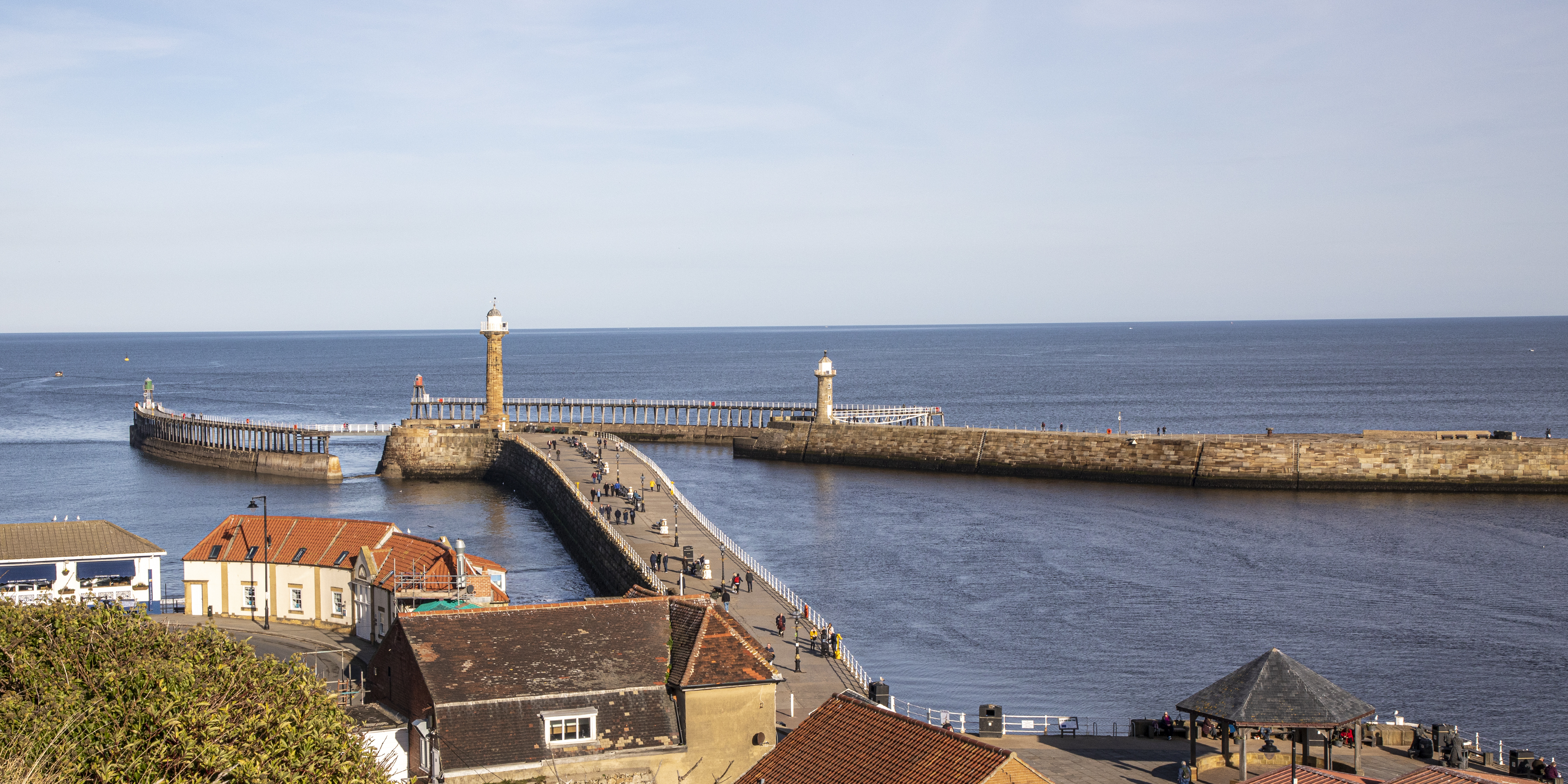
West and East Piers at Whitby in 2021, showing their extensions

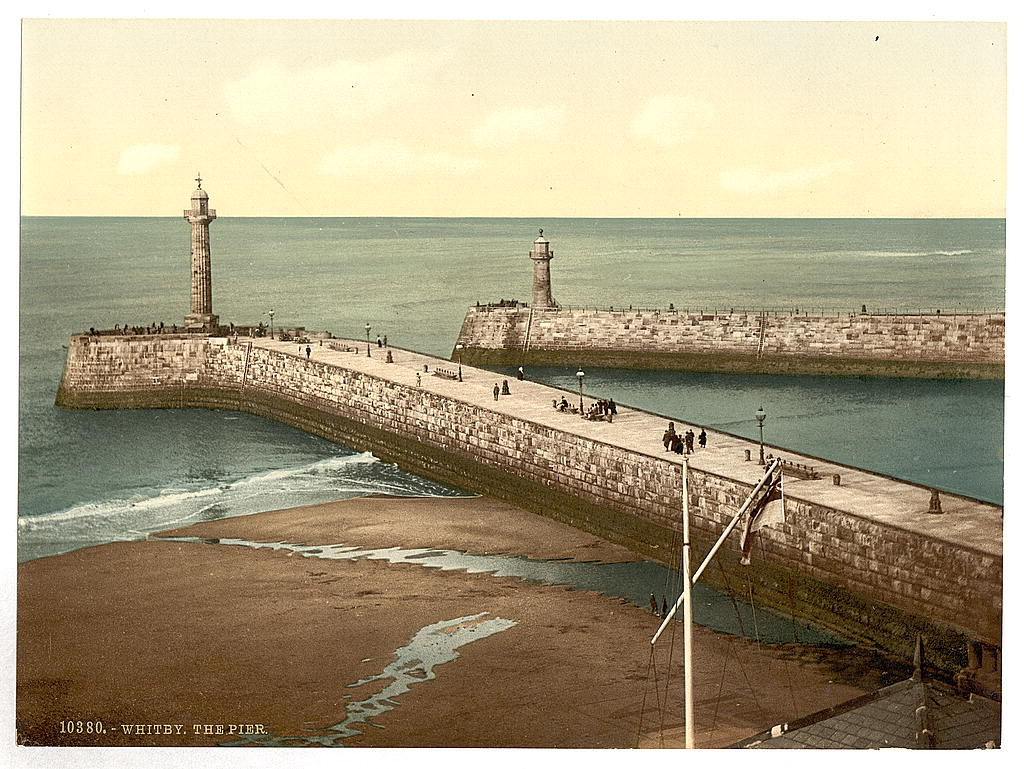
The two piers circa 1900 before the extensions were added

The piers of Whitby are four structures along the River Esk estuary in Whitby, North Yorkshire, England. Whilst all the piers can be accessed by the general public, the piers were not built as seaside attractions – so-called pleasure piers like Redcar, Saltburn or Withernsea – but rather serving a civil purpose, such as ship loading and protecting the harbour. The main West and East piers in the town were built to provide shelter from the currents and storms of the North Sea, and in the 18th and 19th centuries, any ships seeking refuge in the harbour were charged a levy for use of Whitby's safe haven. These levies were used to pay for the maintenance and improvement of the piers.

It has been recognised that Whitby Harbour has been an important maritime centre that dates back possibly to Roman times. Fishing has always been an important and dominant industry, though this lessened in the 20th century. Historically the export of alum, the importing of coal, and then the shipbuilding industries, have been crucial to the development of the town. The River Esk harbour in Whitby is the only natural harbour between the Tees and the Humber.

Both piers were extended in the early 20th century in an effort to control low water flow and a whirlpool at the harbour entrance. The two pier extensions have been described as "... reach[ing] out to sea like the mandibles of some great insect."

Of note is that the Eskdale Anticline divides both piers, despite being only yards apart; the West Pier is built on oolitic sandstone, whereas the East Pier is on alum shale.

== East and West Piers ==
East Pier
- East Pier Lighthouse
- Type: Breakwater
- Coordinates: 54.491°N 0.611°W

Characteristics
- Construction: Sandstone
- Total length: 1,080 feet (330 m); Pier and extension

History
- Completion date: 1854 (present form)
- Listed: Grade II

West Pier
- West Pier
- Type: Breakwater
- Coordinates: 54.492°N 0.613°W

Characteristics
- Construction: Sandstone
- Total length: 1,178 feet (359 m); Pier and extension

History
- Completion date: 1831 (present form)
- Listed: Grade II

A record of several piers in Whitby extend back to Medieval times, with at least one document stating that a pier had existed "at the Dissolution" (1539). However, this has been described as a pier further inland than the current West and East Piers, and is thought to be what is now the Tate Hill Pier. This pier, on the east side of the River Esk, was listed as being the property of Whitby Abbey up until the Dissolution. King Henry VIII ordered that the pier should be repaired from the Crown's purse and that timber for the repairs should come from the "King's woods" in the locality. At this time, the harbour at Whitby was an export centre for alum, which led in turn to coal being imported. Then in the 17th and 18th centuries, shipbuilding became an important industry. However, the mainstay of the harbour was providing anchorage and offloading services to the fishing industry.

Sir Hugh Cholmeley built a pier on the west side of the mouth of the Esk estuary in the 17th century to protect his coal staithes. The engineering implemented in the design of this pier was used by his son, when he built the mole at Tangier in the late 17th century. Repairs to both piers were undertaken around 1632, but work had been halted by the effect of the civil war. The early piers in the town were largely constructed of a timber frame with "loose stones" dropped within the frames.

Parliament was petitioned several times in the 17th century, with one example being from 1696 stating that Whitby Harbour was "...one of the most commodious in the North of England, being able to take 500 ships of sail...but the ancient piers being much decayed the mouth of the harbour was almost choked up.." An Act of Parliament in 1702 provided the necessary funds to build two piers from stone. Collier ships seeking refuge in Whitby were charged a toll "one halfpenny per Newcastle Chaldron (Note: A Newcastle Chaldron differed in weight to that of a London Chaldron, a ratio defined as 8:15 (Newcastle:London).) on all coals shipped at Newcastle, Sunderland and parts north, passing to the south..." However, all commodities were taxed on entering the harbour, and in 1720, a third act of parliament was granted whereby chaldrons of coal were charged at one farthing. The construction of the piers afforded the town a guaranteed safe haven for shipping, a coveted status for any port, and thus also aided the shipbuilding industry of the town. Between 1702 and 1908, at least twelve Acts of Parliament were passed which related directly to the upkeep, extension, renovation or building of piers at Whitby.

A map of 1740 shows the East Pier at about 750 feet (230 m) long, and the West Pier to be about 1,000 feet (300 m). However, the first Ordnance Survey map of 1849 shows the West Pier to be 1,250 feet (380 m) in length, and in 1860 the East Pier was estimated to be 313 yards (286 m). These had been repaired and extended in 1734 to 1749, and rocks in the channel between had been removed in an effort to stop sand gathering at the river mouth and forming sandbanks which were prohibitive to harbour traffic. The West Pier is 32 feet (9.8 m) above normal sea/river level, whereas the East Pier is 30 feet (9.1 m) above the water line. The current west and east piers extend into the sea either side of the River Esk mouth and provide shelter from the North Sea. The original end of the stone West Pier was rounded so that it allowed the current to flow into the river mouth. Both piers were built of sandstone in the 18th century, and had the extensions built on in the early part of the 20th century. However, the engineer Francis Pickernell, who worked for the Whitby Piers and Harbour Board, relaid the west pier in 1814, with stone from nearby Aislaby Quarry, which made the overall length of the West Pier 338 yards (309 m), the width is 16 yards (15 m), but widening to 18 yards (16 m) at the rounded end.

The West Pier was furnished with a low rail on the river side, which acted as a rubbing rail, to prevent ropes being worn out on the rock sides of the pier. The West Pier Lighthouse was built at the end of the West Pier in 1831, and this was visited by Princess Victoria in 1834. The East Pier was built to a length of 215 yards (197 m) and a width of 15 yards (14 m) in 1814, with further works between 1844 and 1850. However, both were adapted and were not listed as being complete in their present forms until 1831 for the West Pier, and 1854 for the East Pier. The East Pier Lighthouse was also completed in 1854. Work on the East Pier during this time narrowed the gap between the two pier ends from 290 feet (88 m) to 150 feet (46 m) at the seabed, and 170 feet (52 m) at the normal sea level.

In 1734, the base of the West Pier at Scotch Head was furnished with a stone crescent which contained ammunition stores and cannon which pointed out to sea. Twelve cannon were mounted at Battery Parade (the head of the West Pier), seven were mounted on the East Pier (lined in a row facing out to sea), and a further two cannon were placed on the rounded end of the West Pier. The guns were removed after the Napoleonic wars came to and end. The harbour trustees at Whitby were concerned about the charges levied on the passing coal trade, as it was felt that the prices might prevent all but the desperate to use Whitby harbour, but conversely, lowering the charges might not generate enough revenue to maintain the upkeep on the harbour and the piers. In 1846, the revenues earned was just over £2,400, and in 1847, the amount was £2,675. The pier maintenance was kept up after their renovations, and a bill of 1837 from the harbour engineer (Francis Pickernell), shows that he purchased coal-tar, treenails, oakum, deck nails and 1 imperial gallon (4.5 L; 1.2 US gal) of whale oil.

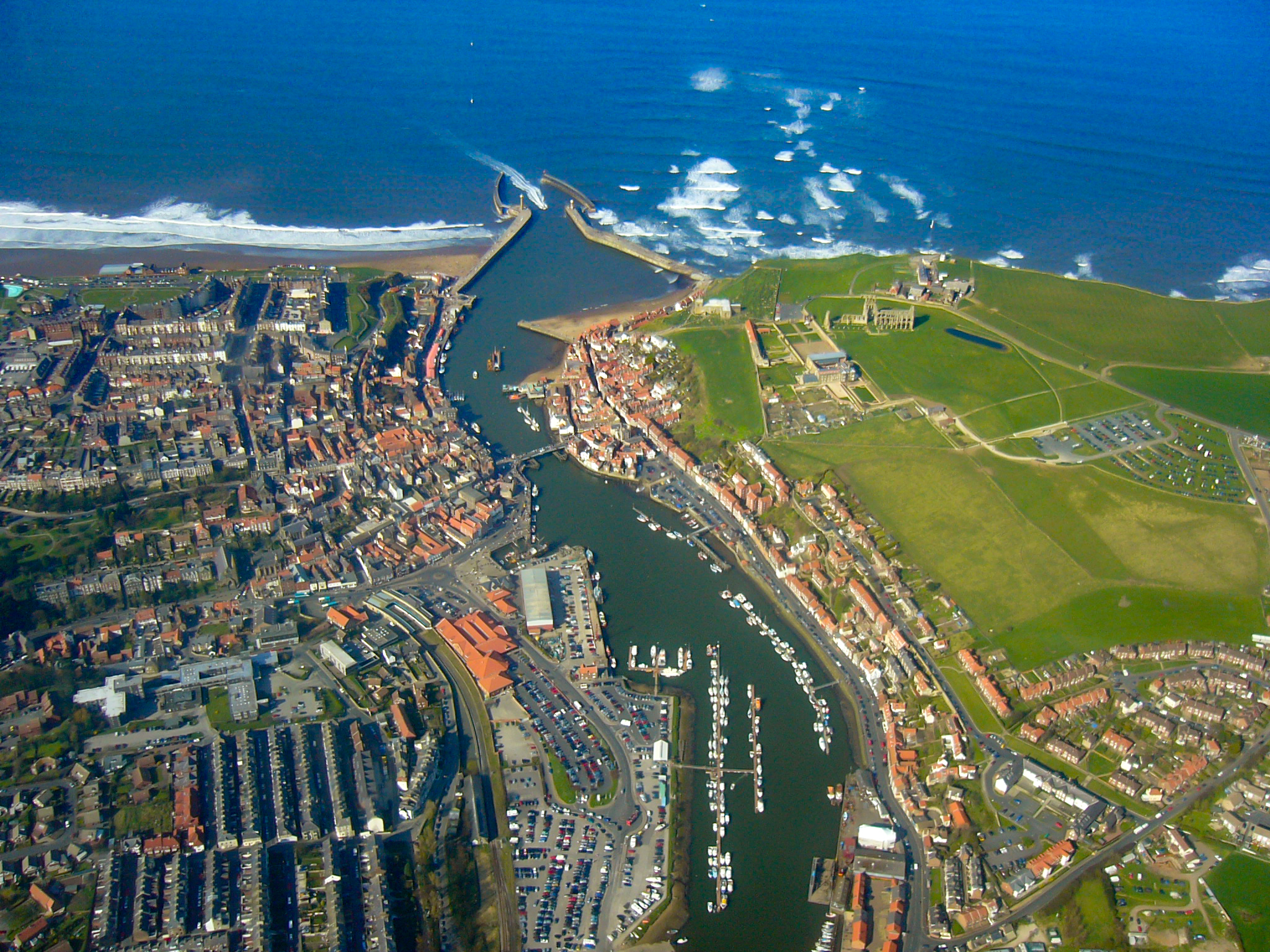
This image shows the relatively peaceful harbour compared to the sea, and the "mandible" piers

Both the West and the East Piers had extensions put onto the end which stretched a further 500 feet (150 m) into the sea. This was agreed on by Whitby Urban District Council in 1908, which decided on an extension of both piers almost doubling their size, and each with a lighthouse at the end. This made the total length of the East Pier 1,080 feet (330 m), and the West Pier 1,178 feet (359 m).

The poor flow of the River Esk due to mills upstream, the low tides and the unbalanced pier lengths, all combined to make a whirlpool at the harbour mouth which was dangerous to shipping. The Admiralty recommended lengthening the piers, among other measures, to prevent the whirlpool forming, and also the sanding up of the harbour mouth. Additionally, due to the whirlpool, ships wishing to enter the harbour had to sail quite close to the East Pier, which did not project as far seaward as the West Pier. However, at low water, the combination of a shallow flow (about 2 feet (0.61 m)), and the whirlpool made it prohibitive for heavier ships to be able to get into the harbour, which in hot weather was ruining the fish catch that had yet to be landed.

The extensions to each pier are made up of concrete bases, 30 feet (9.1 m) thick at the sea floor, tapering to 18 feet (5.5 m) thick 7 feet (2.1 m) above the normal high water mark. Upon the concrete bases above water, each pier was designed to have a wooden frame some 15 feet (4.6 m) high, making the entire pier to a depth of 37 feet (11 m). The pier extensions were made using a "walking man" crane, that moved forward slowly on a wooden frame, placing items upon the sea-bed below it to allow for progressive building. The pier extensions were completed in 1912. The ladders connecting the 1914 Pier extensions were removed in 1940 as a security measure.

In the North Sea flood of 1953, a large section of the East Pier by the headland (the original pier), was substantially damaged by "ferocious seas". The two piers were grade II listed in December 1972. Both piers still retain capstans, mooring posts and pulleys, which demonstrate their commercial history besides that of preventing flooding. In 2006, local author Malcolm Barker stated that the two piers were "lengthened in the early 20th century and now reach out to sea like the mandibles of some great insect." The East Pier was disconnected from its extension in 2001 due to an unsafe footbridge linking the two parts of the pier. In 2018, a new footbridge extending to 89 feet (27 m) was installed to allow pedestrian access again.

An extensive refurbishment of both piers was completed in November 2019, which sought to reduce further extensive maintenance in the future and prevent sea flooding the Harbourside Drive, with the slipway on the West Pier acting as a funnel for the incoming water, and a curved sandstone block structure at the base of the west pier, acted to funnel water away from Pier Road in the town. The works cost over £6.7 million. Being a notable location in Whitby, the piers have featured in TV and films, including Heartbeat, and Victoria. The noted Whitby photographer, Frank Sutcliffe described the West Pier as "given up to fashion and frivolity" whilst stating that the East Pier was usually deserted apart from fishermen.

== Tate Hill Pier ==
Tate Hill Pier
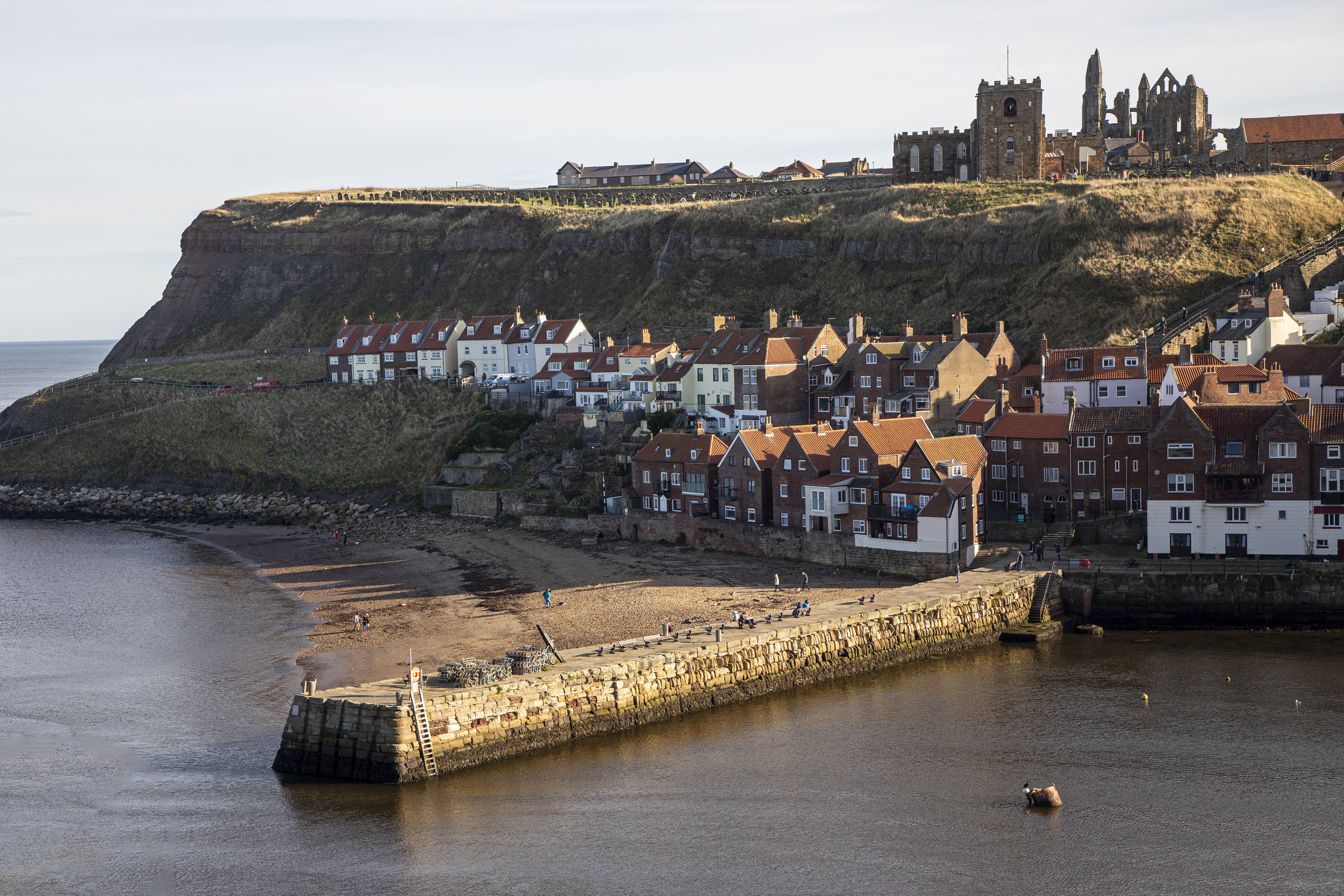
- Tate Hill Pier, Whitby
- Type: Loading/unloading quay
- Coordinates: 54.489°N 0.612°W

History
- Listed: Grade II

Tate Hill Pier (also known as the East Pier and the Burgess Hill Pier) was deemed to have been at least 105 yards (96 m) in length when it was rebuilt c. 1766, with the join of the extension being quite visible. Its original name of Burgess Pier is thought to derive from its original sponsors, the Burgesses of Whitby who had the pier built before the Trustees board was enacted by Parliament in 1702. Evidence points to a pier at this location as far back as 1190, when fallen rocks were arranged at that location to protect boats in the harbour. This has led to some writers referring to Tate Hill Pier as the "oldest non-religious building in the town [Whitby]," and possibly the oldest pier in the world (though not of original construction).

At some point it became known as Tate Hill Pier because of the narrow lane (Tate Hill) that led onto the pier itself. A document of 1545 stated "it is verye necessarye that all the Woods within the Parishe of Whitbye or elce where nere thereunto be reservyde for the mayntenaunce of the Kyyngs Tenements and cottages in Whitbye and at Robynhood baye, and of the Peyr against the Sea at Whitbye where the Kyngs Majestie hath adredye imployed great somes of Money." In 1626, the pier was described as being "much decayed". This pier is long held to be that which now occupies the site of Tate Hill Pier.

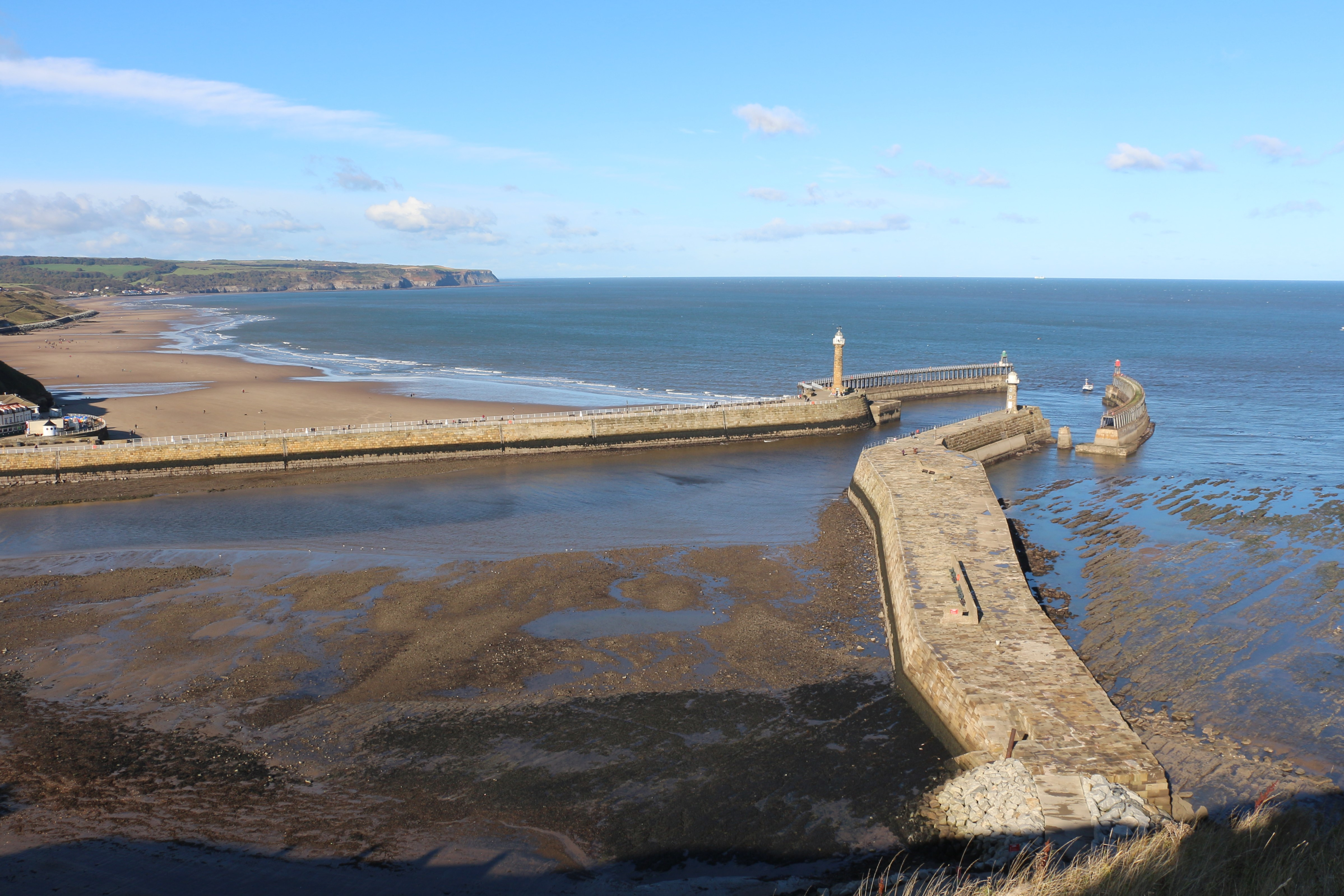
Whitby Piers: this shows the beach beyond the West Pier. Collier Hope, and the alum shale are either side of the East Pier

The position of Tate Hill Pier from the east cliff has led to some suggesting that the pier was the original East Pier, which predates the building of the current West and East Piers by some time. As stated, its creation around 1190 meant that it was the only pier protecting the harbour until the 17th century. When Scotch Head pier was constructed, it was said that the two piers projecting out into the river were protecting the harbour from the power of the sea, and the distance between the two is 72 yards (66 m). The pier was noted as being unusual in that its rectangular blocks were stacked facing upwards rather than horizontally. There is a possibility that the remnants of earlier piers lie underneath the one at Tate Hill.

Between 1822 and 1863, the Whitby lifeboat was kept here, overhanging the water from the south side of the pier. The davits for the suspended lifeboat were not removed until the 1970s. At the start of the kipper industry in Whitby in the 1830s, many kipper houses (where the herrings where smoked over oak) were built at the head of Tate Hill Pier. The pier was grade II listed in December 1972.

In Bram Stoker's novel Dracula (1897), the pier features as a landing point for Dracula as a dog, who the comes ashore and leaps up the 199 steps. This event was inspired by the wreck of the Demeter in 1855, which was photographed by Frank Sutcliffe, and seen in print by Bram Stoker in 1890. At the end of Tate Hill Pier is a large black anchor, which was caught in the nets of the MV Ocean venture in November 1991. It is unsure which ship the anchor came from, but was gifted to Whitby as a symbol of its nautical heritage.

The patch of land between Tate Hill Pier and the East Pier is known as Collier (or) Collier's Hope, where Whitby Cats (flat-bottomed collier ships, hence the name of Collier's Hope) landed to offload coal. Whilst this is overlaid with sand, it is hard alum shale underneath. Indeed, both the West and East piers are sat on different rocks due to the Eskdale Anticline: the West Pier is built on oolitic sandstone, and the East Pier is built on hard alum shale (which can also be seen in the West and East Cliffs at Whitby respectively). This is why there is sand westwards from the West Pier to Sandsend, and why there is hard rock eastwards from the East Pier through Saltwick Nab.

== Fish Pier ==
Fish Pier
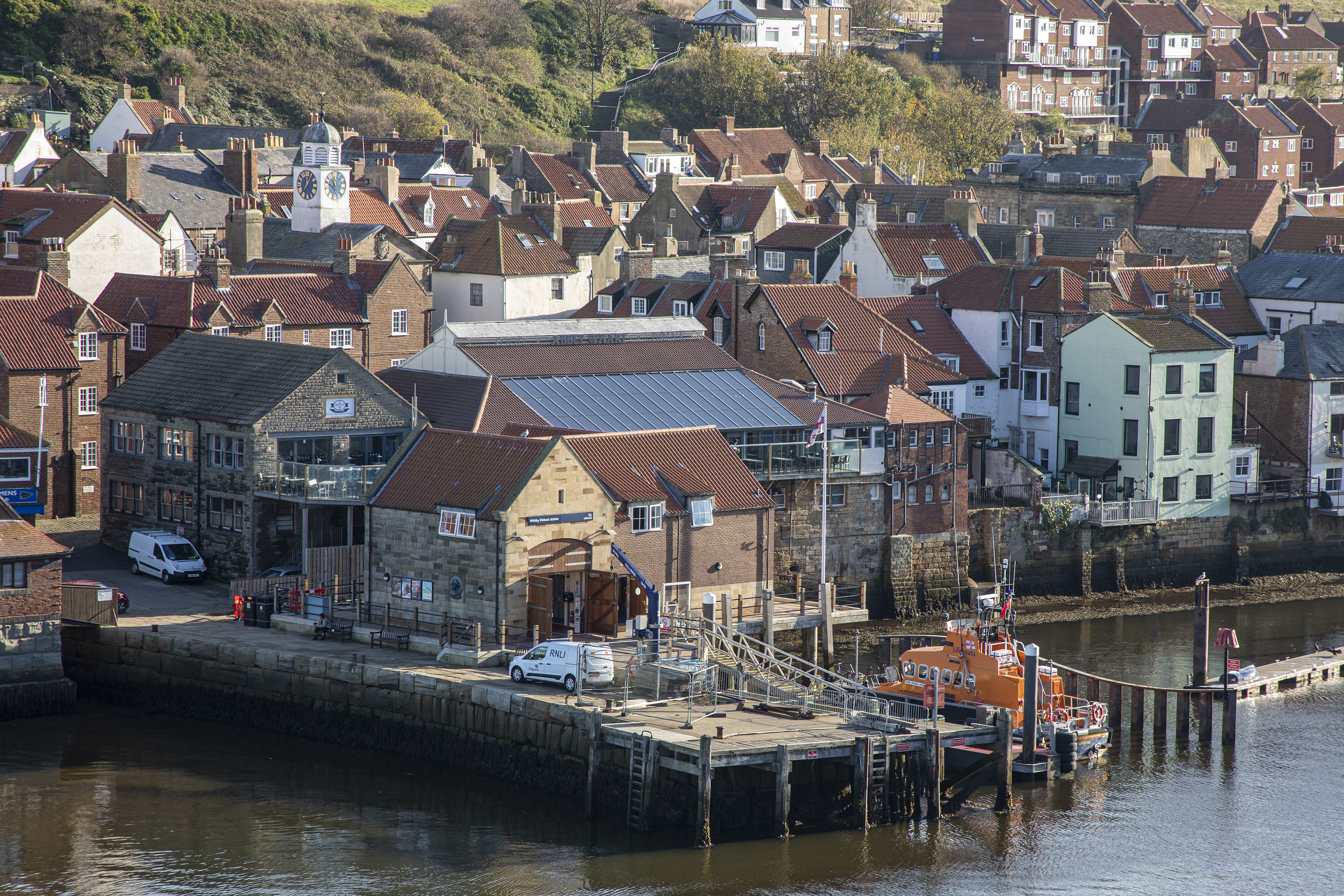
- Fish Pier at Whitby
- Coordinates: 54.488°N 0.613°W

Characteristics
- Total length: 65 yards (59 m)

History
- Completion date: 1780-1790
- Listed: Grade II

Fish Pier was built sometime between 1780 and 1790, and extends 65 yards (59 m) into the harbour at a 90 degree angle to the outward flow of the river. The name of the pier was taken from the large building at the base of the pier which was called Fish House. Fish markets were held on the pier, and in other places where fish were landed alongside the River Esk in Whitby.

Improvements to the Fish Pier were undertaken in 1880, this was to allow for easier onward transportation of landed fish to be exported from Whitby by rail transport. The pier was grade II listed in December 1972. At some point in the early 20th century, the pier was widened and lengthened slightly by the addition of a timber frame around the end of the pier. Whilst its original intent of landing fish has lessened during the same period, it is now the mooring point for the Whitby Lifeboat, whose lifeboat station is just to the south of the pier.

== Other piers ==
At the base of the West Pier, is a small rounded pier, a remnant of a pier which extended into the harbour by 44 yards (40 m). The area around the end of West Pier was known as Scotch Head. This was before the gap in the cliff was developed as the Khyber Pass (Note: Both Khyber Pass and Spion Kop, the hill adjacent to the pass, are local names derived from the days of the British Empire when both names had a historical notoriety for the empire.) in 1848 by George Hudson in his desire to turn Whitby into a resort for his railway empire. The name Scotch Head is of uncertain origin, being probably the place where Scottish fishing boats moored when engaging in herring fishing. However, it could also have been where stone for the piers was dressed, as a stonemasons yard was located here and Scotching was a term for dressing stone. A bandstand is now located on Scotch Head Pier.

A small pier existed at the Coffee House, now the Marine Hotel. This is directly opposite the Fish Pier, and in the days before the main piers at the harbour mouth, represented the edge of the harbour.

== See also ==
- Listed buildings in Whitby (central area - east)
- Listed buildings in Whitby (central area - west)
