= Whitby West Pier Lighthouse =

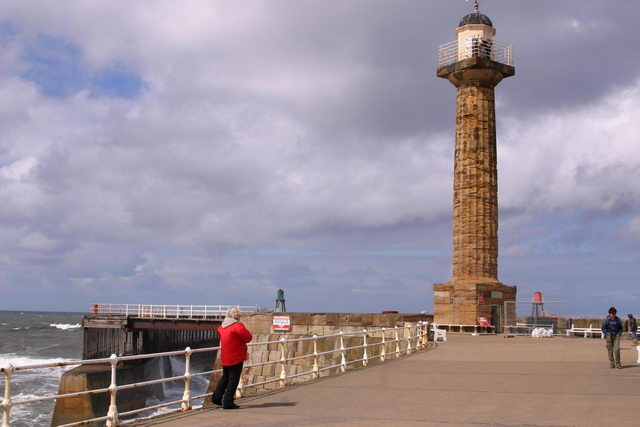
- Location: Whitby; North Yorkshire; England
- OS grid: NZ 89943 11722
- Coordinates: 54°29′34″N 0°36′46″W

Tower
- Constructed: 1831
- Construction: stone (tower)
- Height: 25 m (82 ft)
- Shape: cylindrical tower with balcony and lantern
- Markings: Black (dome), white (lantern), unpainted (tower)
- Operator: Whitby Harbour Board
- Heritage: Grade II listed
- Fog signal: 1 blast every 30s

Light
- Characteristic: occasionally F G
- Whitby West Pier beacon
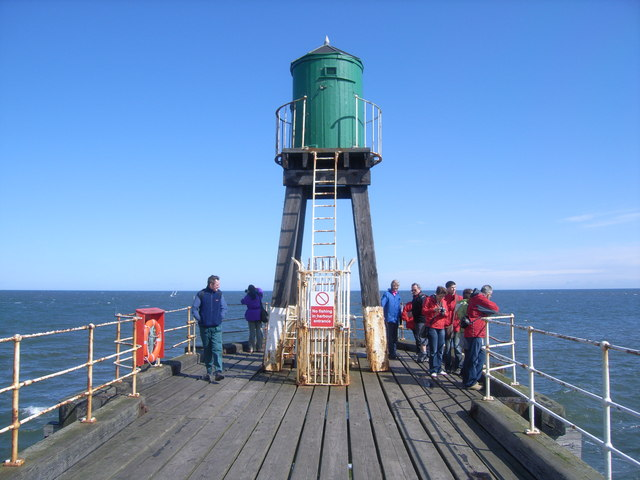
- Constructed: 1914
- Construction: lumber
- Height: 7 m (23 ft)
- Shape: cylindrical lantern on a four legs skeletal structure
- Markings: Unpainted (tower), green (lantern)
- Operator: North Yorkshire Council
- Focal height: 12 m (39 ft)
- Range: 5 nmi (9.3 km; 5.8 mi)
- Characteristic: Q G

Whitby West Pier Lighthouse is, along with Whitby East Pier Lighthouse, one of two lighthouses protecting the entrance to the harbour of the town of Whitby in the English county of North Yorkshire. As its name suggests, it is located on the West Pier of that harbour. Built in 1831, it is the older and, at 84 feet (25.5 m), the taller of the two.

The West Pier Lighthouse was visited by Princess Victoria in 1834, shortly after it was opened.

In about 1914, the west pier was extended a further 500 feet (150 m) into the sea, and a new beacon was added to the end of this extension. The west pier extension also accommodates a foghorn that sounds a blast every 30 seconds during fog. New lights were fitted to both the lighthouse towers and the beacons in 2011.
