= St Chad's Church, Hutton-le-Hole =

Church in Hutton-le-Hole, North Yorkshire, England

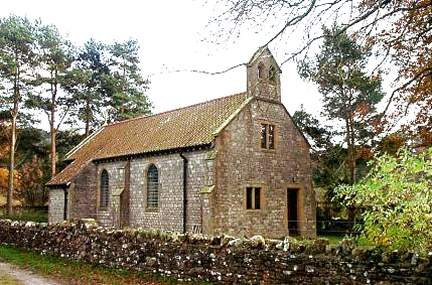
The church, in 2005

St Chad's Church is an Anglican church in Hutton-le-Hole, a village in North Yorkshire, in England.

Hutton-le-Hole lies in the parish of St Mary's Church, Lastingham. A church for the village was designed by Elijah Hoole in 1871, but was not constructed. A school was built in the village in 1875, and the classroom was used to hold Anglican services. A Congregationalist chapel was built in the village in 1840, but was disused by the end of the century. In 1901, it was converted into an Anglican chapel of ease, and was dedicated to Saint Chad. In 1934, a new chapel was constructed, to a design by E. Priestley Cooper.

The church is built of Oxclose stone. Inside, there are a font and lecturn which were brought from Ryton, an oak reredos from Welburn Hall, and altar rails designed by Robert Thompson, from Douthwaite Hall. The pews came from All Saints' Church, Kirkbymoorside, the organ from a Methodist church in Scarborough, and a stone cross from the former Congregationalist chapel. The windows in the sanctuary contain stained glass depicting Saint Chad, the crucifixion and Annunciation.
