= Whitby East Pier Lighthouse =

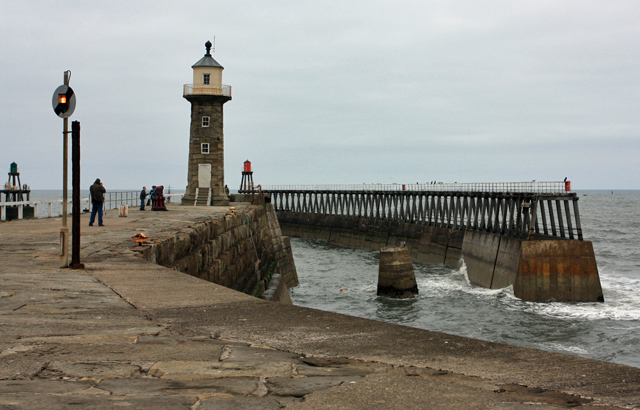
- Location: Whitby; North Yorkshire; England
- OS grid: NZ 89943 11722
- Coordinates: 54°29′34″N 0°36′43″W

Tower
- Constructed: 1855
- Construction: stone (tower)
- Height: 17 m (56 ft)
- Shape: cylindrical tower with balcony and lantern
- Markings: Unpainted (tower), white (lantern), black (dome)
- Operator: Whitby Harbour Board
- Heritage: Grade II listed
- Fog signal: 1 blast every 30s

Light
- Deactivated: 1914
- Whitby East Pier beacon
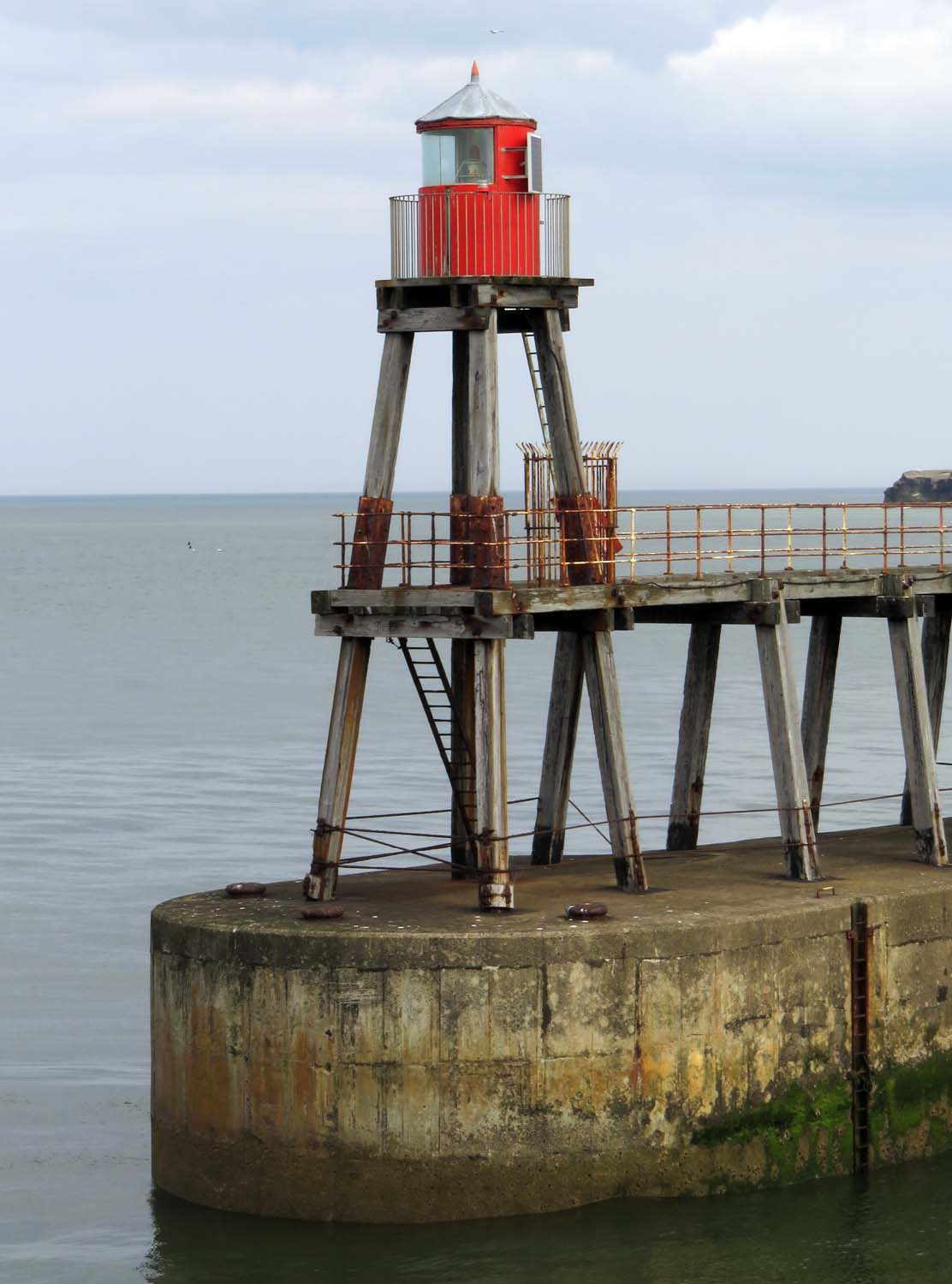
- Constructed: 1914
- Construction: lumber (tower)
- Height: 7 m (23 ft)
- Shape: cylindrical lantern on a four legs skeletal structure
- Markings: Unpainted (tower), red (lantern)
- Operator: North Yorkshire Council
- Focal height: 12 m (39 ft)
- Range: 5 nmi (9.3 km; 5.8 mi)
- Characteristic: Q R

Whitby East Pier Lighthouse is, along with Whitby West Pier Lighthouse, one of two lighthouses protecting the entrance to the harbour of the town of Whitby in the English county of North Yorkshire. As its name suggests, it is located on the East Pier of that harbour. Built in 1855, it is the newer and, at 54 feet (16.5 m) , the shorter of the two.

In about 1914, the east pier was extended a further 500 feet (150 m) into the sea, and a new beacon was added to the end of this extension. New lights were fitted to both the lighthouse towers and the beacons in 2011.

== See also ==
- Listed buildings in Whitby (central area - east)
