= Listed buildings in Aislaby, Scarborough =

Aislaby is a civil parish in the former Scarborough district of North Yorkshire, England. It contains 26 listed buildings that are recorded in the National Heritage List for England. Of these, two are listed at Grade II*, the middle of the three grades, and the others are at Grade II, the lowest grade. The parish contains the village of Aislaby and the surrounding countryside. Most of the listed buildings are houses, cottages and associated structures, farmhouses and farm buildings. The other listed buildings include a parish hall, a bridge, a church, and a war memorial.

== Key ==
| Grade | Criteria |
|---|---|
| II* | Particularly important buildings of more than special interest |
| II | Buildings of national importance and special interest |

== Buildings ==
| Name and location | Photograph | Date | Notes | Grade |
|---|---|---|---|---|
| Red House Farmhouse and barn 54.46172°N 0.69238°W | — | 1692 | The farmhouse is in stone, with a moulded eaves cornice, and a pantile roof with stone copings and curved kneelers. There are two storeys and three irregular bays, and two gabled rear extensions. The doorway has a moulded and chamfered surround, the windows are casements, and there are the remains of mullioned and transomed windows. The barn to the left has two storeys, three bays and an outshut, and it contains an upper floor loading door and slit vents. | II |
| Parish Hall; 54.46620°N 0.67433°W | — | 1732 | Originally a church, later converted into a parish hall, it is in stone, and has a Welsh slate roof with stone gable copings. There is a single storey and two bays. At the west end is a Venetian window, and the other windows are casements. On the roof is a small cupola. | II |
| 36 Main Road; 54.46643°N 0.67479°W | — | 18th century | A cottage at the end of a terrace, it is in whitewashed stone, and has a pantile roof with stone coped gables and square kneelers. There are two storeys, a single bay, and it contains a doorway and casement windows. | II |
| Ivy House and stable 54.46695°N 0.67325°W | — | 18th century | A stone farmhouse with a pantile roof, coped gables and moulded kneelers. There are two storeys, three bays, and a rear wing. The central doorway has Doric columns, a blind radial fanlight and an open-pedimented hood. The windows are sash windows with keystone. To the left is a single-storey stable with stable doors. | II |
| 1 and 2 Home Farm, byre, cartshed and stables 54.46056°N 0.68224°W | — | 18th century | The farmhouse, which has been divided into two cottages, is in stone, and has pantile roofs with stone copings and square kneelers. There are two storeys and five bays, and two outshuts. The doorways have plain surrounds, and the windows are horizontally-sliding sashes. To the north is a cartshed-byre with an external stair to an upper door, and attached to it is a long single-storey stable with stable doors and fixed lights. | II |
| Walls southeast of Pond House; 54.46668°N 0.67471°W | — | 18th century | The walls are in stone with flat copings. They extend along both sides of the front garden. | II |
| Stable southwest of Red House Farmhouse; 54.46172°N 0.69277°W | — | 18th century (probable) | The stable is in stone, with large quoins, and a pantile roof with stone copings. The building has an L-shaped plan, and contains stable doors. | II |
| Sundial, Former Woodlands Hall; 54.45996°N 0.67279°W | — | 18th century | The sundial in front of the south front of the formrt hall is in stone. It has a square plinth, an octagonal stepped base, and an urn-shaped reeded column supporting an engraved round slab with a gadrooned border and an acanthus-carved soffit. | II |
| Groves Hall; 54.46149°N 0.66740°W | | Late 18th century | A house that was extended in the early 19th century, it is in stone, with stepped eaves, and pantile roofs with stone copings and curved kneelers. Each part has two storeys and attics, and three bays. The doorway has a cornice hood on long moulded brackets. Most of the windows are sashes, on the front are two two-storey canted bay windows, in the left wall are two triangular bay windows, and there are two square-headed dormers. | II |
| Former Woodlands Hall; 54.46010°N 0.67282°W | | Late 18th century | A large house, later a school and subsequently converted into apartments, it was extended in 1919 by Walter Brierley. The building is in stone with quoins, an embattled parapet and hipped pantile roofs. It is mainly in two storeys with attics, and has an irregular plan. On the front is a pedimented prostyle porch, and a doorway with a round architrave and a patterned radial fanlight. The windows are sashes, some under shallow segmental arches with voussoirs and keystones, and in the roof are dormers. | II* |
| Pond House; 54.46672°N 0.67499°W | — | c. 1789 | The house is in stone, with a floor band, an eaves band, pilasters, a plain parapet with a pediment containing an oculus, and a Lakeland slate roof with coped gables. There are two storeys and five bays, and flanking single-storey single-bay wings. In the centre is a Doric doorway with a patterned fanlight and an open pediment. | II* |
| Pigsties west of 1 and 2 Home Farm; 54.46058°N 0.68239°W | — | Late 18th or early 19th century | The pigsties are in stone with a pantile roof. The building is small, with two cells, stable doors and a central half-partition. | II |
| Byres, barn and sheds, Ivy House; 54.46710°N 0.67281°W | — | Late 18th or early 19th century | The farm buildings are in sandstone, and have pantile roofs with stone coped gables and kneelers. They are in one and two storeys, and form an L-shaped plan. The taller barn has pigeon holes on the gable end, and most openings are original. | II |
| Rose Cottage; 54.46583°N 0.67963°W | — | Late 18th or early 19th century | A small house in stone, with a pantile roof, stone copings and square kneelers. There are two storeys, two bays, and a recessed two-bay rear extension. In the centre is a porch, and the windows are sashes in architraves. | II |
| School Farmhouse and outbuilding 54.46572°N 0.67568°W | — | Late 18th or early 19th century | The farmhouse and cottage to the right, later combined, are in stone, with a Lakeland slate roof. There are two storeys and three bays. Most of the windows are sashes, there is one tripartite window with a central opening light, and to the left is a long single-storey extension with a pantile roof. | II |
| Thistle Grove Farmhouse and barn 54.45822°N 0.67697°W | | Late 18th or early 19th century | The farmhouse, later two houses, is in stone, and has a pantile roof with stone coping and curved kneelers. There are two storeys, and two bays, a lower two-storey extension, and further extensions to the rear. The types of windows vary, and include cross-casements, a fixed light, and three-light windows with opening centre sections. | II |
| Park Hall; 54.46632°N 0.67314°W | — | Early 19th century | The house is in stone, and has a slate roof with coped gables. There are two storeys and two bays, and a long wing to the east. The windows are sash windows, some with eared architraves. On the garden front are two square bay windows, and on the entrance front is a full-height canted bay window with bracketed eaves and a hipped roof. | II |
| Cottage east of Park Hall; 54.46662°N 0.67233°W | — | Early 19th century | A stable converted into a cottage, it is in stone, and has a slate roof with coped gables. It is a long building with a single storey, and the openings have segmental heads. On the roof is a circular domed dovecote, with three tiers of shouldered, round-arched pigeon holes divided by moulded string courses. Two dormers and roof lights have been inserted. | II |
| Walls, gate piers and gates, Park Hall; 54.46660°N 0.67341°W | — | Early 19th century | The walls enclosing the garden are in stone, partly with rounded coping, and partly with flat stone coping. The gate piers are rusticated, the main pair with ball finials, and the gates are in wood. | II |
| Bridge south of Pond House; 54.46646°N 0.67456°W | — | Early 19th century | The bridge, which approaches the house over a round pond, is in stone. It consists of a single round arch with wavy parapets. | II |
| Garden Walls west of Ivy House; 54.46690°N 0.67353°W | — | Early to mid 19th century | The walls are in stone with gabled copings, and are buttressed on the north side. The walls step down towards the west, and the south wall is only about 1.2 metres (3 ft 11 in) high. The adjacent cottages have separate inner walls to their gardens. | II |
| Woodleigh House, Woodleigh Cottage, Chestnut Barn and wall 54.46568°N 0.67657°W | — | Early to mid 19th century | Two houses in stone, the roofs partly in slate and partly in pantile, and with two storeys. The larger house has four bays, a hip-ended roof, a prostyle Doric porch, and a doorway with an oblong fanlight. The lower house to the north has two bays, and both houses have sash windows. Further to the north is an outhouse range, and a coped wall that runs to the east along the roadside. | II |
| 18 and 20 Main Road; 54.46688°N 0.67315°W | — | Mid 19th century | A pair of cottages in stone, with a tile roof, coped gables and shaped kneelers. There are two storeys and four bays. Each cottage has a doorway, and the windows are casements. | II |
| St Margaret's Church; 54.46551°N 0.67929°W | | 1896 | The church is in stone with a tile roof, and has a cruciform plan. It consists of a nave, a north porch, a south transept, a chancel with an apse and a north vestry, and a tower at the junction of the nave and chancel. The tower has a round projecting stair turret and an embattled parapet. Most of the windows are lancets, and at the west end is a stepped lancet window. | II |
| War memorial 54.46582°N 0.67918°W | | After 1918 | The war memorial stands in a triangular area in the centre of a road junction. It is in stone, and consists of a Celtic cross with interlaced ornament, on a square tapering plinth, on a round stepped base. On the plinth are panels with the names of those lost in the two World Wars. | II |
| Gardener's Cottage, Hillside Cottage and White Rose Cottage; 54.46083°N 0.67464°W | | Undated | A stable range converted into three cottages, it is in stone, and has a pantile roof with some tiles. There are two storeys, three bays and single-storey single-bay wings. The middle three bays have an embattled parapet, gabled over the middle bays, and ramped down over the outer bays. On the front are two canted bay windows, and the other windows are sashes. On the left is a recessed barn. | II |
