= St Margaret's Church, Aislaby =

Church in Aislaby, North Yorkshire, England

Coordinates: 54.4655°N 0.6793°W

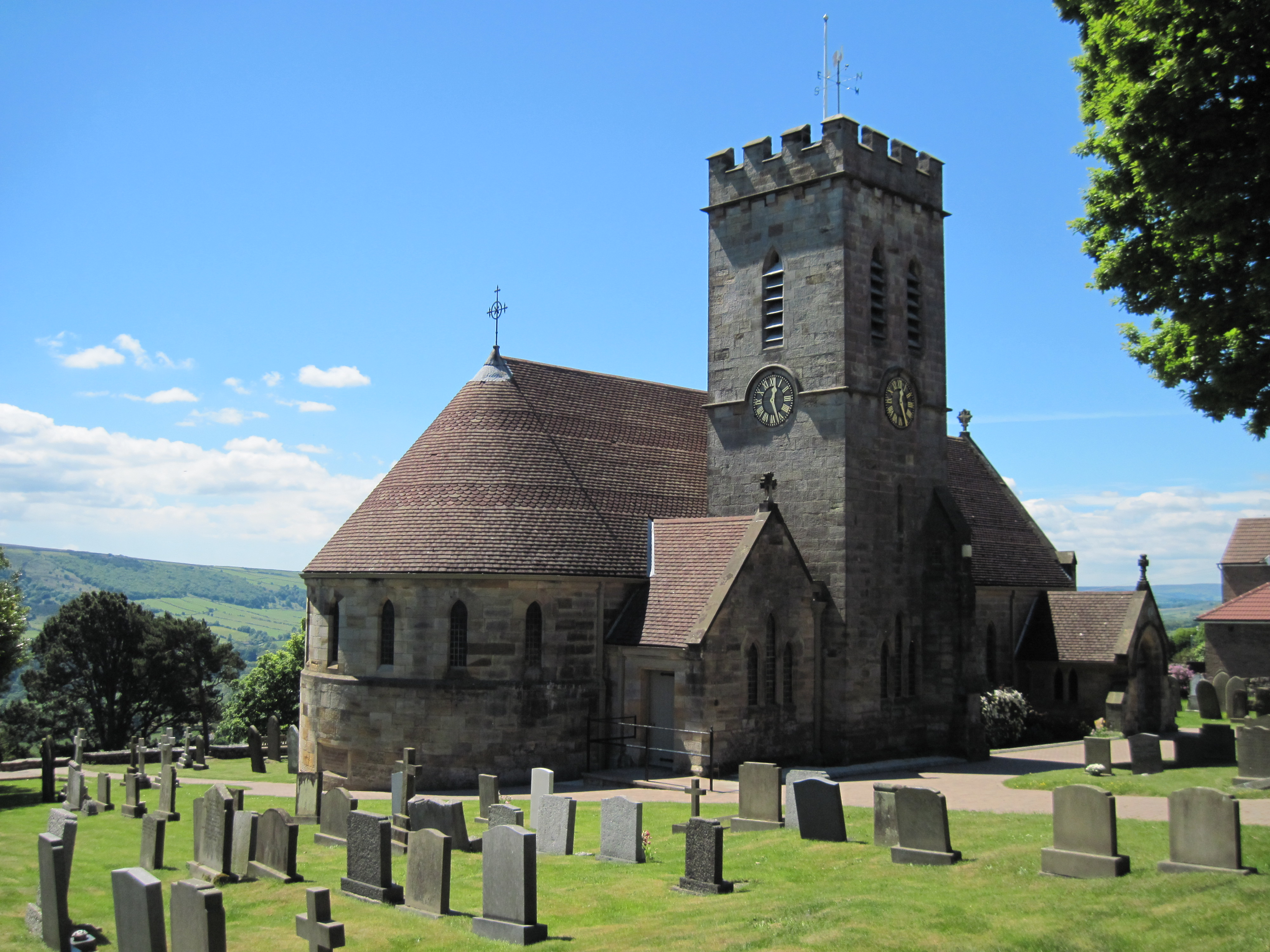
The church, in 2009

St Margaret's Church is the parish church of Aislaby, a village near Whitby, in North Yorkshire, in England.

There was a Mediaeval chapel in Aislaby, which in 1732 was replaced by a church, a plain, rectangular building. This church was replaced in 1896 by a new church, designed by Edward H. Smales. The church of 1732 survived, and was later converted into a parish hall.

The current church is built of stone, and has a roof of concrete tiles. It has a cruciform plan, with a chancel in the form of an apse. The tower is over the north transept, and the porch and vestry are also on the north side. The tower has battlements, and a stair turret. The west window, of stepped lancets, has stained glass by W. F. Curtis, Ward and Hughes, as do some smaller lancet windows, while other windows have glass by Shrigley and Hunt. The choir stalls and communion rail are both made of oak. Both the current church and the parish hall are Grade II listed.

== See also ==
- Listed buildings in Aislaby, Scarborough
