= Aislaby, Scarborough =

Village and civil parish in North Yorkshire, England

Coordinates: 54°27′57″N 0°40′35″W

Aislaby
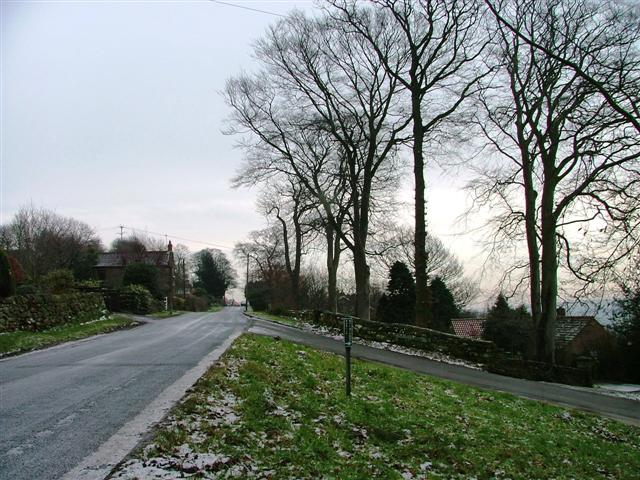
- Aislaby

- Location within North Yorkshire
- Population: 243 (2011 census)
- OS grid reference: NZ857086
- Civil parish: Aislaby
- Unitary authority: North Yorkshire
- Ceremonial county: North Yorkshire
- Region: Yorkshire and the Humber
- Country: England
- Sovereign state: United Kingdom
- Post town: WHITBY
- Postcode district: YO21
- Dialling code: 01947
- Police: North Yorkshire
- Fire: North Yorkshire
- Ambulance: Yorkshire
- UK Parliament: Scarborough and Whitby

Aislaby (/ˈeɪzəlbi/ AYZ-əl-bi) is a village and civil parish in North Yorkshire, England. It is situated near the town of Whitby on the northern slopes of Eskdale just off the A171.

== History ==
The village is mentioned in the Domesday Book as Asuluesbi in the Hundred of Langbaurgh. It was listed as having 2 ploughlands with 6 acres of meadow and woodland. The Lord in 1066 was named as Uhtred, but had changed to Richard of Sourdeval under the tenancy of Count Robert of Mortain. Lordship descended to the Brus family by the reign of Henry I and then Lucy de Thweng via the Rosels family and Nicholas de Meynell. By the early fourteenth century it had passed as a mense lordship to Arnald de Percy. From then on it was held by the Darcy family and the Strangways until 1541 when it became part of the holdings of Lord Dacre until 1685. Like its namesakes near Pickering and the other to the west of Stockton-on-Tees the place-name is derived from Viking Old Norse meaning "Aslakr's or Asulf's farm".

The area around the village is noted for its quarries, and the stone that was used in many local buildings and further afield in some notable structures such as London Bridge and Ramsgate Pier. Local buildings constructed from the stone include Pond House which is grade II* listed.

== Governance ==
The village lies within the Scarborough and Whitby Parliamentary constituency.

From 1974 to 2023 it was part of the Borough of Scarborough. It is now administered by the unitary North Yorkshire Council.

== Demography ==
The Parish area is approximately 1,086 acres (439 ha). According to the 2011 UK census, Aislaby parish had a population of 243, in 164 dwellings, a reduction on the 2001 UK census figure of 280.

Historical population

Year	Pop.	±%
1881	337	—
1891	340	+0.9%
1901	273	−19.7%
1911	273	+0.0%
1921	299	+9.5%

Year	Pop.	±%
1931	293	−2.0%
1941	n/a	—
1951	245	—
1961	215	−12.2%

Source: GB Historical GIS / University of Portsmouth

== Community ==
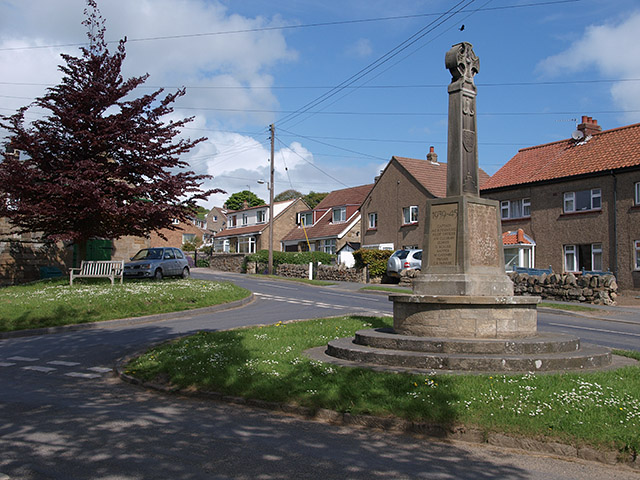
Aislaby war memorial

The village lies within the catchment area of Stakesby Community Primary School in Whitby for Primary Education and of Eskdale School and Caedmon College Whitby for Secondary Education.

== Religion ==
St Margarets' Church, Aislaby was built in 1897. This replaced a 1732 building that itself had replaced the earlier medieval church. The church is Grade II listed building.

== See also ==
- Listed buildings in Aislaby, Scarborough
