= Pond House, Aislaby =

House in Aislaby, North Yorkshire, England

Coordinates: 54°28′00″N 0°40′30″W

Pond House is a historic building in Aislaby, a village near Whitby in North Yorkshire, in England.

The two-storey stone house was built between 1782 and 1789, probably by Francis Breckon. Breckon leased the house to Rebecca Boulby, who had a relationship with Breckon's son, which resulted in three children. The couple did not marry, and a court case led to the children inheriting the house, in lieu of maintenance payments.

The house has a slate roof, and brick chimneystacks. It is five bays wide, with single-storey one-bay wings either side. Original features include the sash windows, and a Doric order doorcase with a fanlight above. Inside, there is a central entrance hall with curved staircase, two main reception rooms, a kitchen and a garden room, along with six bedrooms and two bathrooms.

The house was Grade II* listed in 1969.

== See also ==
- Listed buildings in Aislaby, Scarborough
