= Church of St Mary, Lastingham =

- St Mary's Church
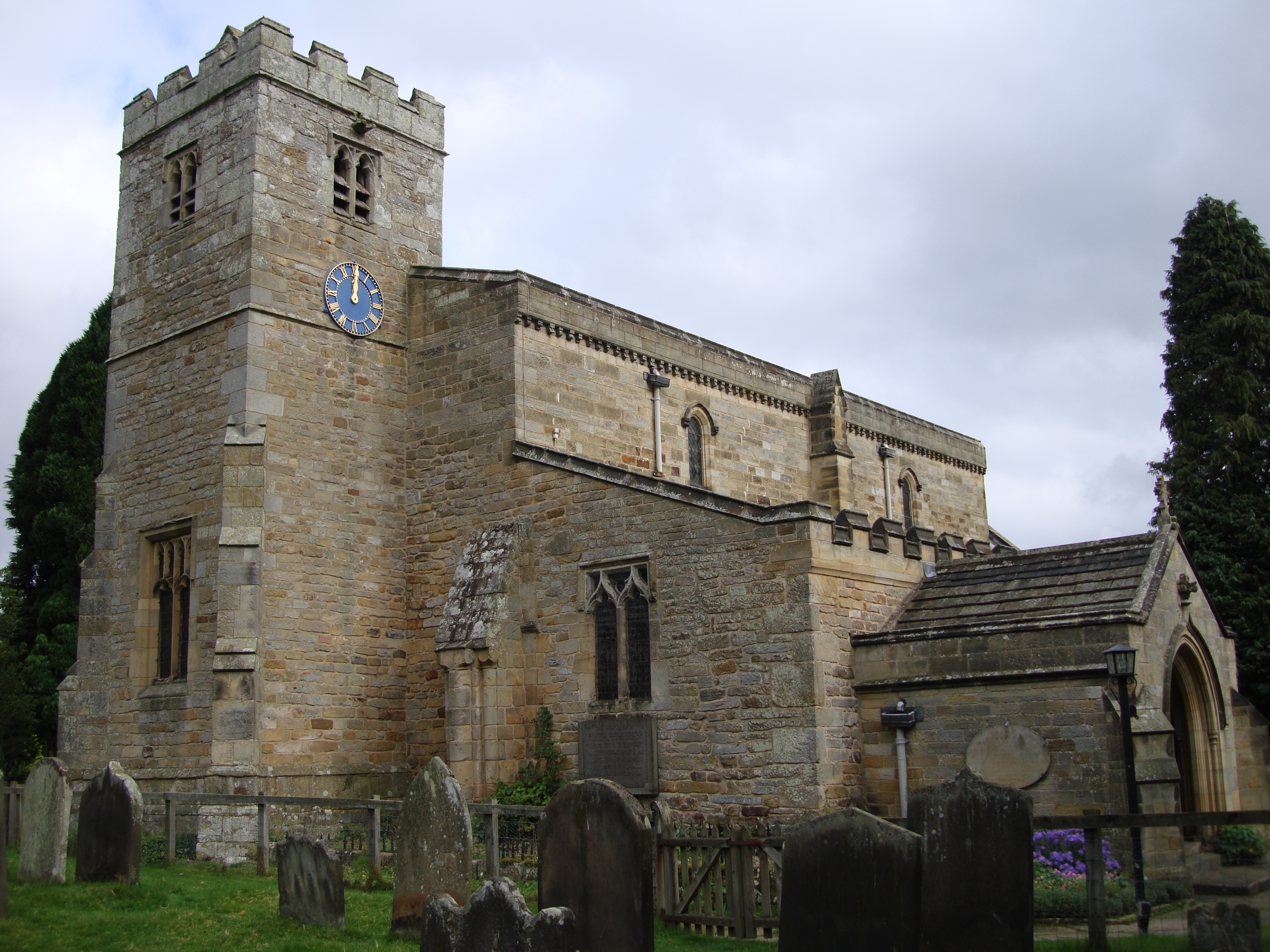
- Church of St Mary, Lastingham

- Location within North Yorkshire
- 54.3045°N 0.8826°W
- OS grid reference: SE 72808 90452
- Location: Lastingham, North Yorkshire
- Country: England
- Denomination: Church of England
- Website: Official website

History
- Status: Active
- Founded: 654
- Founder: St Cedd
- Dedication: St Mary the Virgin

Architecture
- Style: Norman; Perpendicular
- Years built: 1078–1086

Administration
- Diocese: York
- Archdeaconry: Cleveland
- Deanery: Northern Ryedale
- Benefice: Lastingham with Appleton-le-Moors and Rosedale
- Parish: Lastingham

Listed Building – Grade I
- Designated: 14 July 1955
- Reference no.: 1316041

The Church of St Mary, Lastingham, is the Church of England parish church for the village of Lastingham in North Yorkshire, England. The parish is 4 miles (6.4 km) north of Kirkbymoorside, 6 miles (9.7 km) west of Pickering and 30 miles (48 km) north east from York.

The first church on the site was a Catholic monastery founded in 654, though the present church dates from the latter part of the 11th century and became an Anglican parish church during the English Reformation. Lastingham has been an important part of Christian heritage and culture in Northern England and as such, has been a place of pilgrimage, especially for its rare crypt, which is said to be unique architecturally for England, and possibly, the world.

== History ==
Bede described how, in 654, monks established a wooden monastery at Lastingeau, which in Bede's time (730) meant the abode of Læ̃sta's people. The land for the monastery was procured from the King of Deira and the monks established their house in "a fold of the Yorkshire Moors". Cedd was the first abbot and he died of the plague at Lastingham in 664. At first he was buried in the open air, but the monks eventually built a church around him. This church has no substantial structures left; it is thought that the church was destroyed during the various raids in the area over the next 400 years, particularly by Danish invaders.

When Cedd died, his brother Chad, took over as abbot and running of the monastery, but not long afterwards, he moved to Lichfield. Eventually, the relics and remnants of St Cedd's presence at Lastingham were removed and kept with those of his brother in Lichfield. Some of their bones are now entombed in Birmingham's Catholic Cathedral though St Cedd is believed to be mostly buried at Lastingham.

The monastery is believed to have been destroyed in 870, but William the Conqueror gave permission for a new church to be built on the site in 1078, when a cohort of Benedictine monks from Whitby, set up the new church under Stephen. However, they only stayed for ten years before moving on to York; it was reasoned later that the remoteness of the abbey and the outlaw nature of the area forced them to relocate. The revival of the church has therefore been confined to a clear decade and the Romanesque architecture is prominent in the reconstructed church. Some have pointed out the rarity in being able to see a start and end date in the building of the church.

The church, originally Catholic, became Anglican following the dissolution of the monasteries during the English Reformation.

It was designated Grade I on 14 July 1955.

== Architectural development ==
During the 13th century, arcades, bays and aisle in the north and south parts of the church were added. In the following century, the tower was erected and it was left for five centuries with little further work until 1879, when it was renovated by John Loughborough Pearson with the porch being rebuilt and the whole church being re-roofed. This has led to a mix of architectural styles; the walls of the aisles are Perpendicular, but the nave (and indeed, most of the foundations and crypt) are Norman. Sir Stephen Glynne was quite critical of the restoration, but Nikolaus Pevsner wrote favourably about it describing Pearson's efforts as "remarkably sympathetic". Stone altars in the church have been dated back to Roman times with current thinking being that they were re-worked during the Anglo-Saxon period.

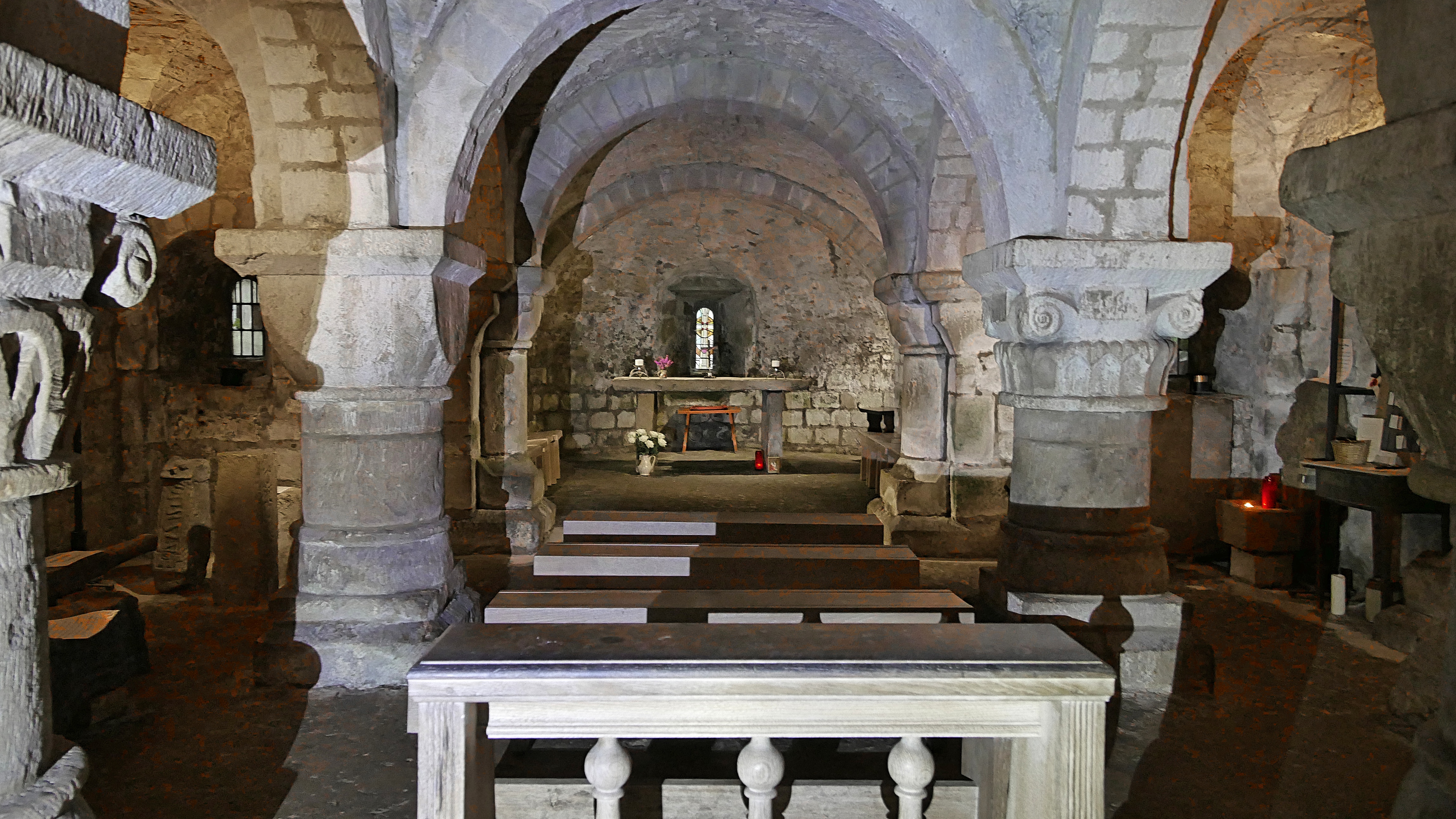
Lastingham church crypt

The crypt underneath St Mary's, has walls that are 3 feet (0.91 m) thick. It is reputed to be the only crypt in England that has a nave, apse and side aisles. The crypt also lays claim to be the oldest Norman crypt in the world and additionally the only one with a nave, aisles and an apsidal chancel. The crypt runs underneath the whole footprint of the church above and is furnished with one square shaft which is indented with a piscina. The crypt is supported by four pillars believed to be pre-conquest in origin and historians estimate that the crypt has not been altered since the time of William the Conqueror. The crypt is accessed by a staircase descending from nave. During the 18th century, cock-fighting was said to have taken place in the crypt, with or without the knowledge of the clergy and churchwarden.

The architecture of the church in conjunction with its history, means that it features on best of lists for churches in England. Pevsner described the crypt as "unforgettable"; John Betjeman concurred describing St Mary's as "one of the most moving places in England". Simon Jenkins is equally effusive in his book, England's Thousand Best Churches, awarding the church four stars out of a possible five and stating that while "most churches are a challenge to the faithful, Lastingham is a challenge to the faithless." Jenkins notes the rarity of the crypt but also points out that the church lacks monuments and historical artefacts:

Lastingham has few furnishings of interest. It does not need them.

Church of Saint Mary

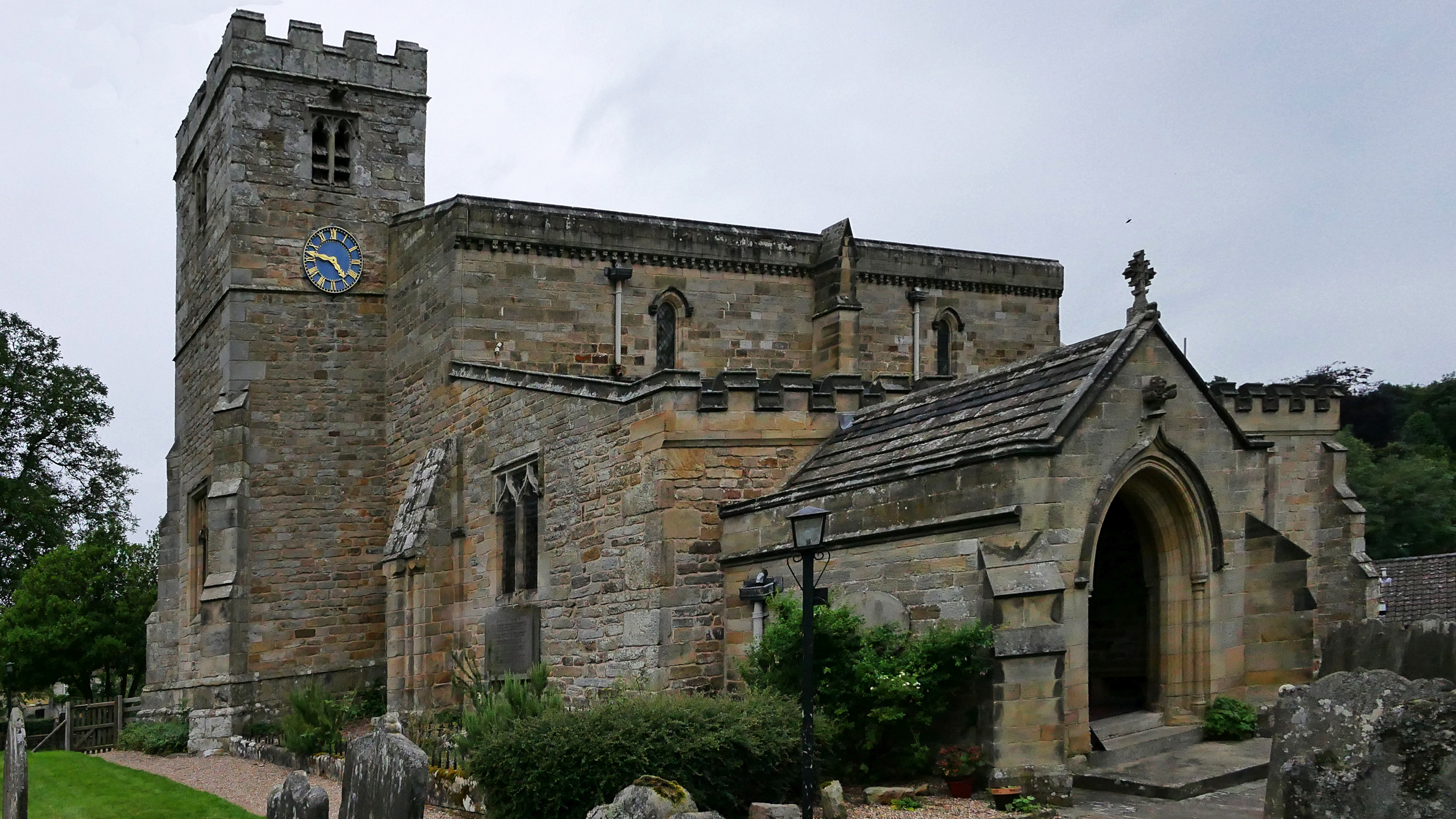
from the south

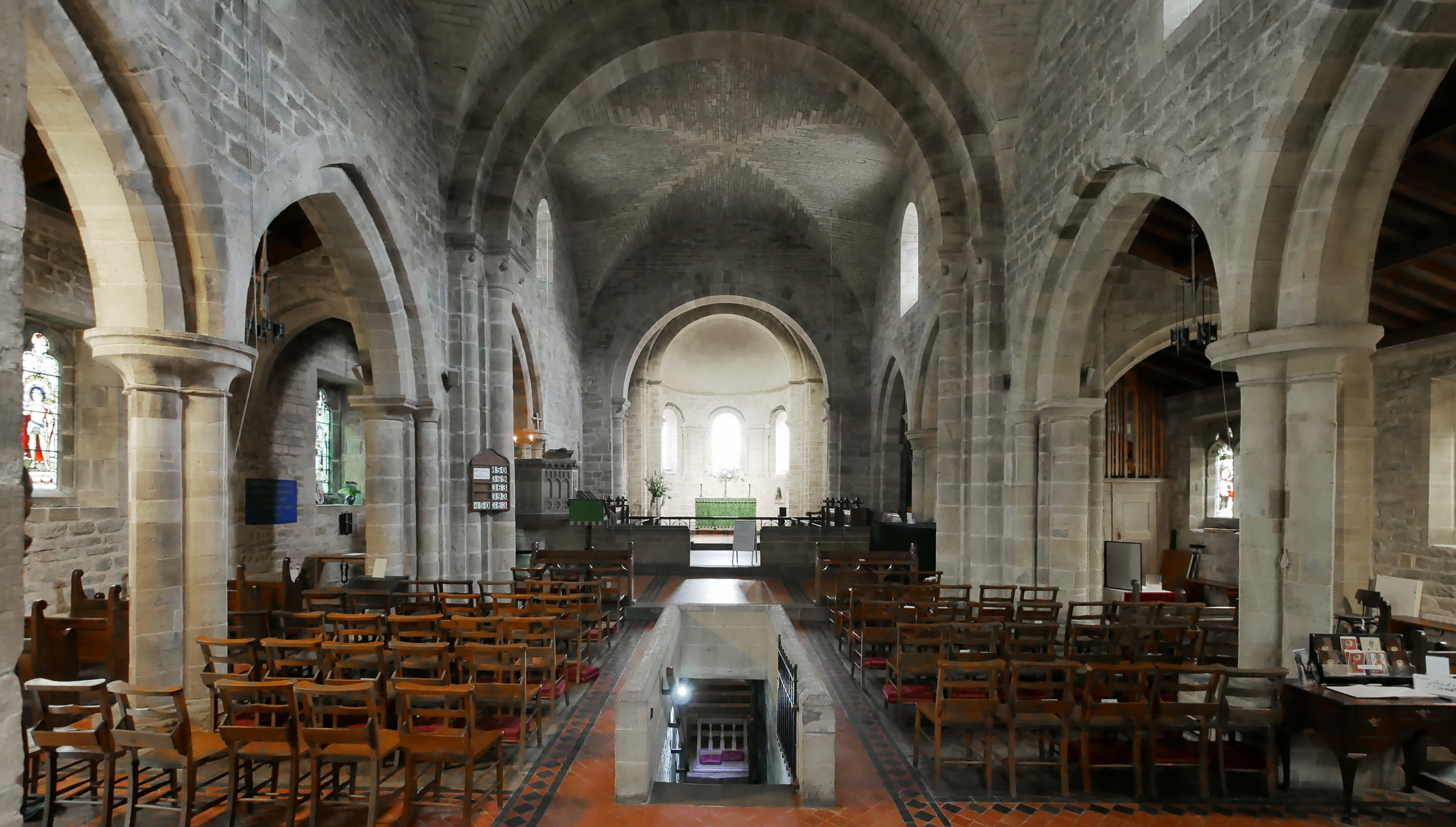
nave

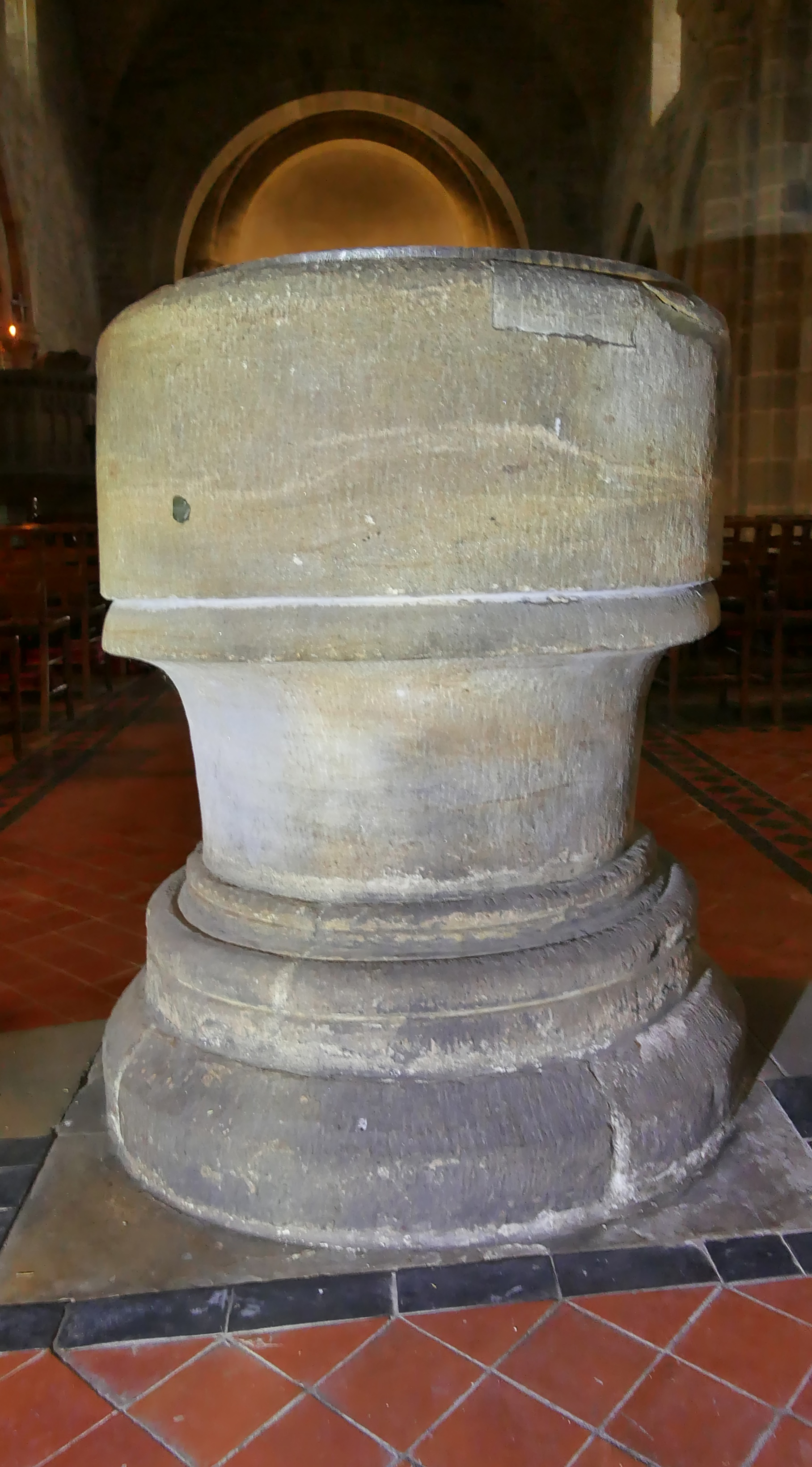
font

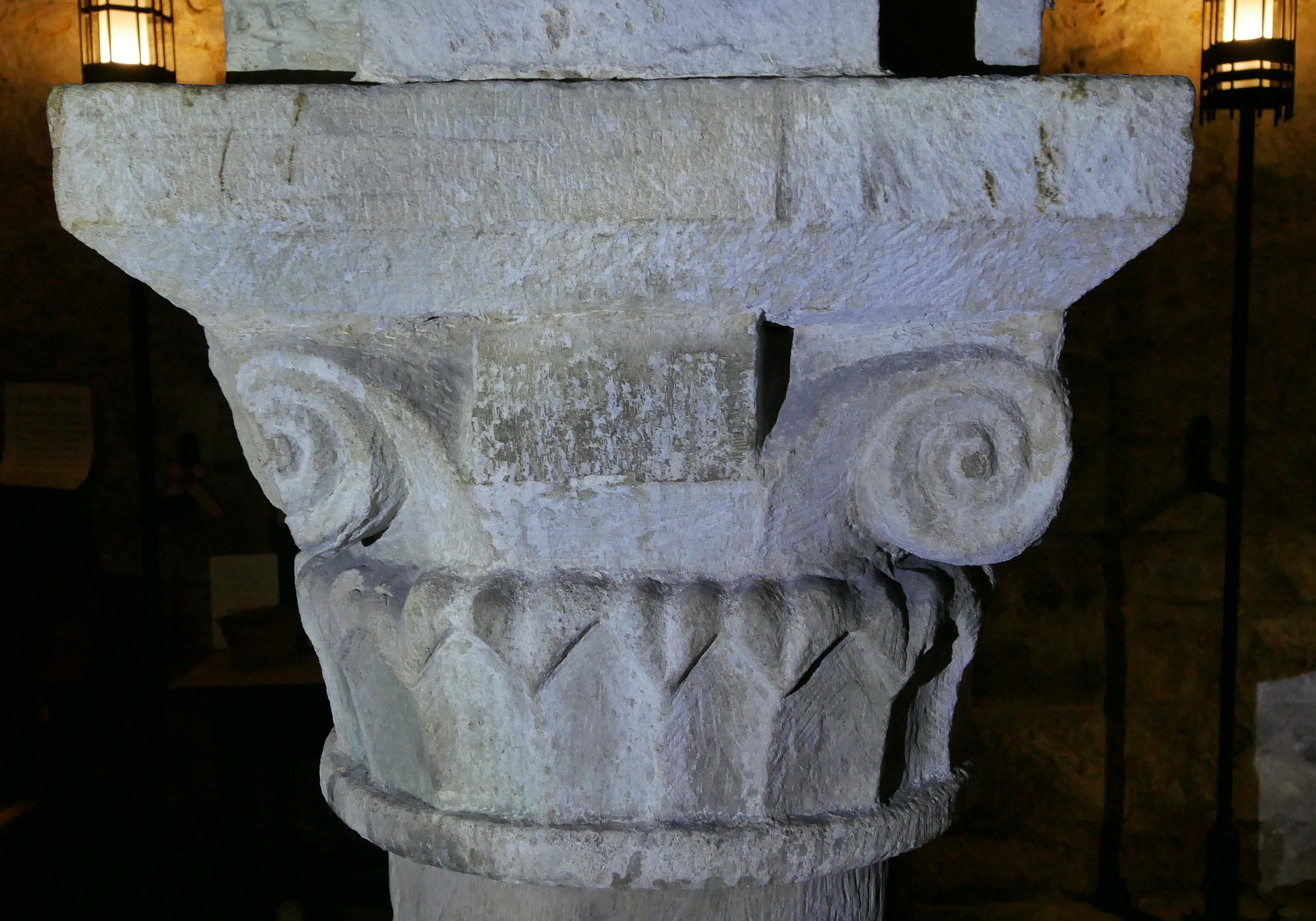
capitals in the crypt

== Parish and benefice ==
The church has been the parish church for Lastingham since at least 1228, although the church was given to St Mary's in York until 1299 and its first vicar is not listed until 1314.

The benefice of Lastingham includes four parishes with five churches; Christ Church, Appleton-le-Moors, St Gregory's Church, Cropton, St Chad's Church, Hutton-le-Hole, (Note: Actually a Chapel of Ease to St Mary's at Lastingham.) St Mary's, Lastingham and St Mary's & St Lawrence's, Rosedale Abbey.

== See also ==
- Grade I listed buildings in North Yorkshire (district)
- Listed buildings in Lastingham
