= St Mary Immaculate Church, Sicklinghall =

Church in Sicklinghall, North Yorkshire, England

Coordinates: 53°55′50″N 1°27′01″W

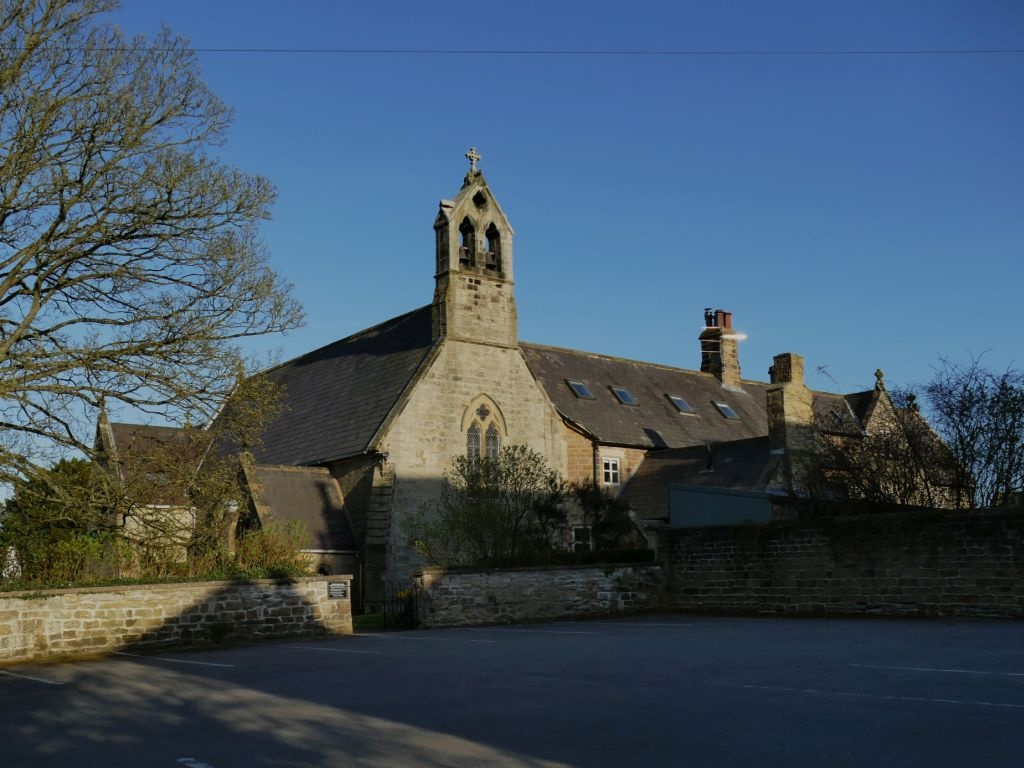
The church, in 2021

St Mary Immaculate Church is a Catholic church in Sicklinghall, a village in North Yorkshire, in England.

From the 1760s, Catholics in Sicklinghall worshipped in the chapel at nearby Stockeld Park. One of the owners of the house, Peter Middleton, funded the construction of a Catholic church in Sicklinghall, which was constructed between 1849 and 1854, to a design by Charles Hansom. He also designed the adjoining presbytery and monastery. A transept and porch were added in 1865, probably to a design by Edward Welby Pugin. The monastery was later converted into the Convent of the Holy Family, which the church became a chapel of ease to St Joseph's Church, Wetherby. The church, presbytery and convent were collectively grade II listed in 1986. The sanctuary was reordered by Vincente Stienlet in 1999. The church is now a chapel of ease of St Joseph's Church in Wetherby.

The church is built of sandstone with a slate roof, and consists of a nave and a chancel, and a north porch and transept. On the west end is a bellcote. To the south is a quadrangle containing the presbytery and former monastic buildings. Inside, there is a west gallery supported on pillars brought from elsewhere, and 1960s neo-Gothic altar, reredos and panelling by Robert Thompson. The oak pews date from 1960, while there is an 18th-century altar in the Lady Chapel. The east window has three lights and contains stained glass by William Wailes.

== See also ==
- Listed buildings in Sicklinghall
