= Giovanni de Mio =

Italian painter

Giovanni de Mio or Demio, also called il Fratino or Fratina or l'Indemio, (after 1510 in Schio – c. 1570) was an Italian painter and mosaicist of the Renaissance.

== Biography ==
He was said to have been a pupil of Giovanni Battista Maganza in Vicenza. He is documented to have been active in 1537 (Venice), in 1538–1539 (Pisa with Vincenzo Bianchini (painter)), in 1544-1548 (at the Sauli Chapel in Santa Maria delle Grazie. He also painted frescoes in Villa Thiene in Quinto Vicentino, and in a church in Torrebelvicino. In 1556 he painted some canvases for the Biblioteca Marciana.
