= Listed buildings in Sicklinghall =

Sicklinghall is a civil parish in the county of North Yorkshire, England. It contains four listed buildings that are recorded in the National Heritage List for England. All the listed buildings are designated at Grade II, the lowest of the three grades, which is applied to "buildings of national importance and special interest". The parish contains the village of Sicklinghall and the surrounding countryside, and the listed buildings consist of a church and associated structures, and three houses, one converted into a hotel.

== Buildings ==
Name and location	Photograph	Date	Notes
Glebe House; 53.93103°N 1.44919°W		Mid-18th century	The house is in gritstone with chamfered quoins, and a tile roof with stone coping and shaped kneelers. There are two storeys and three bays. The central doorway has a Gibbs surround and a triangular pediment. The windows are mullioned and contain 20th-century replacements.
Wood Hall; 53.91607°N 1.44018°W		c.1800	The house was designed by John Carr, and later converted into a hotel. It is in stone, with a floor band, an eaves band, a moulded eaves cornice, and a parapet. There are two storeys and seven bays, the middle bay a segmental bow. On the front is a segmental portico with Tuscan columns, behind which are Tuscan pilasters, and above is a curved balcony with railings, and Ionic pilasters. The windows are recessed sashes with splayed lintels and keystones.
Church of St Mary Immaculate, presbytery and former monastery 53.93063°N 1.45018°W		1849–54	The church was designed by Charles Francis Hansom, and the north transept and porch were added in about 1865. It is built in sandstone with a slate roof, and consists of a nave and a chancel, and a north porch and transept. On the west end is a bellcote. To the south is a quadrangle containing the presbytery and former monastic buildings.
Old Stud Farmhouse; 53.93059°N 1.45122°W	—	Mid 19th century	The house is in gritstone and has a Westmorland slate roof with stone copings and moulded kneelers. There is a main block with two storeys and three bays, a lower and narrower single-bay extension, and a small single-storey addition in the angle. The doorway and the windows, which are sashes, have incised lintels.
