= St Joseph's Church, Wetherby =

Roman Catholic church in West Yorkshire, England

St Joseph's Church
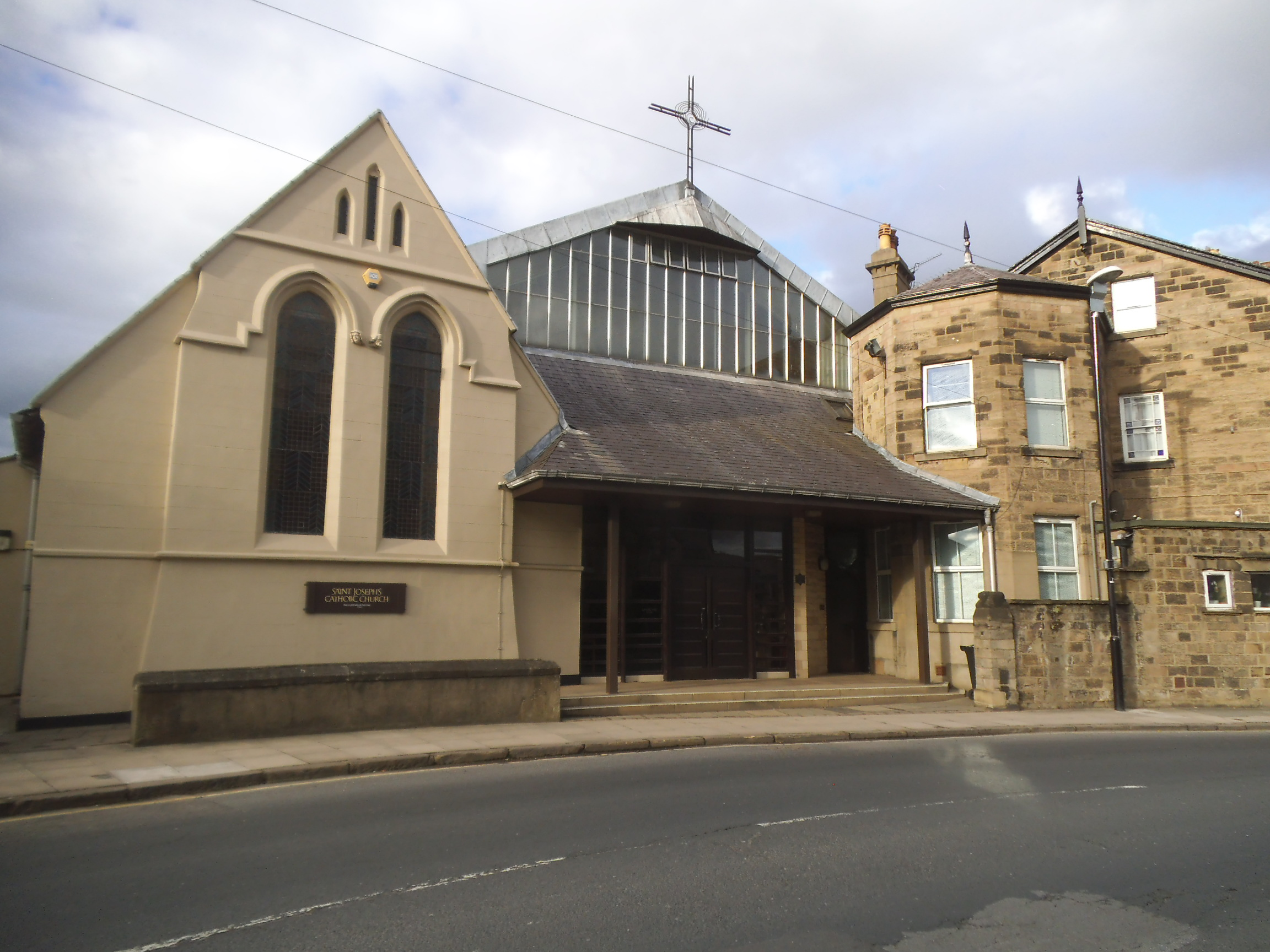
- St Joseph's Church
- St Joseph's Church
- 53°55′46″N 1°23′17″W
- OS grid reference: SE 40283 48334
- Location: Westgate, Wetherby, Leeds, West Yorkshire
- Country: England
- Denomination: Roman Catholic

St Joseph's Church is an active Roman Catholic church in Wetherby, West Yorkshire, England.

== History ==
Prior to the construction of a Catholic church in Wetherby, services took place in the chapel at Stockeld Park and then later at the church of Church of Mary Immaculate at Sicklinghall. In 1872 a chapel was opened over the coach house at Pelham House on Scott Lane. Partly owing to Irish immigration the congregation grew and a decision was taken to build a new church on Westgate. The foundation stone for the new church was laid in 1881 on land donated by Mr Joseph Hirst and it was completed in 1882 at a cost of £1,200. The original church now stands as the church hall. In 1986 the church was extended with a new larger church opening in an adjoining extension to the East of the original church and the existing church was to serve as a church hall.

The church was run by the Oblates of Mary Immaculate however they left the area in 1990 and the church fell into the jurisdiction of the Roman Catholic Diocese of Leeds.

== Architecture ==
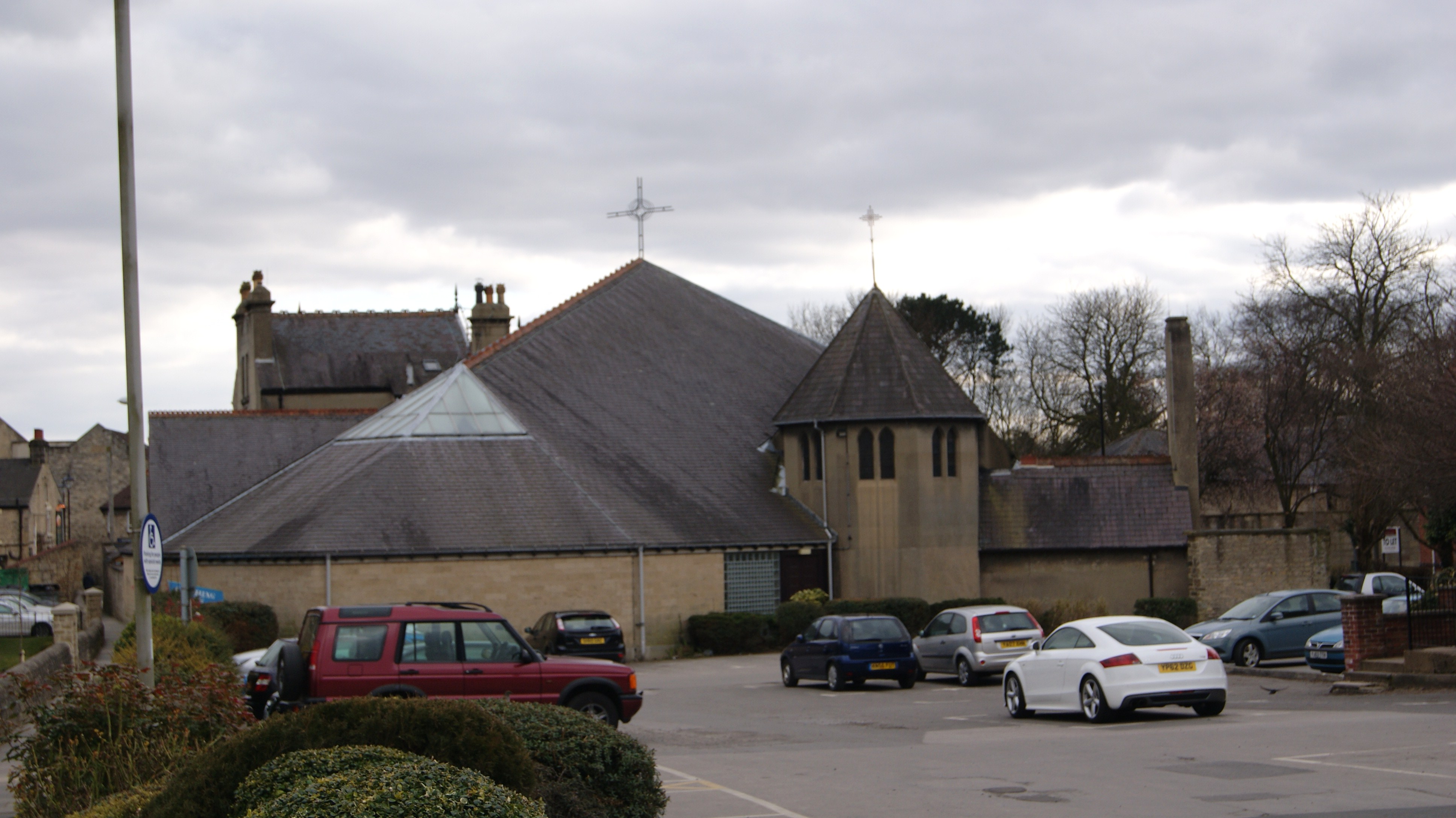
Rear of the church

=== 1882 church ===
The church of 1882 was designed by Edward Simpson of Bradford is a simple rendered building with a slate roof and two south windows. Where the altar previously stood a stage now stands.

=== 1986 extension ===
The extension was designed by Vincente Stienlet and was opened and dedicated on 11 October 1986. The extension won the Leeds Award for Architecture in 1987. There is artwork inside by Fenwick Lawson. Within the 1986 gable is a lozenge shaped stained glass window which sits over the first floor balcony. A concrete spiral staircase connects the balcony with the foyer. The extension sits between the original church and the parochial house, linking the two.

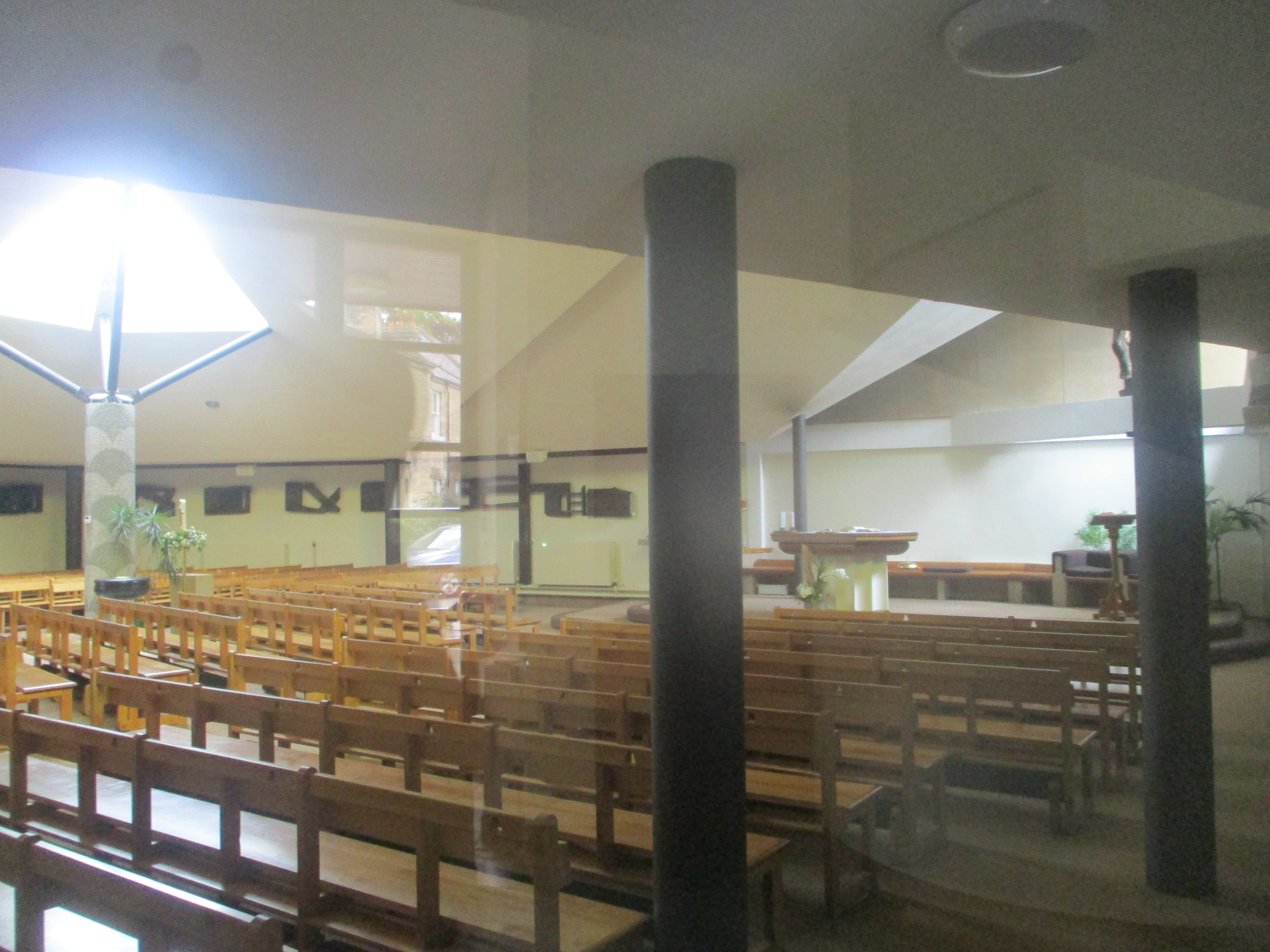
Interior of the 1986 extension
