= Wood Hall Hotel and Spa =

Country house in West Yorkshire, England

Wood Hall Hotel & Spa
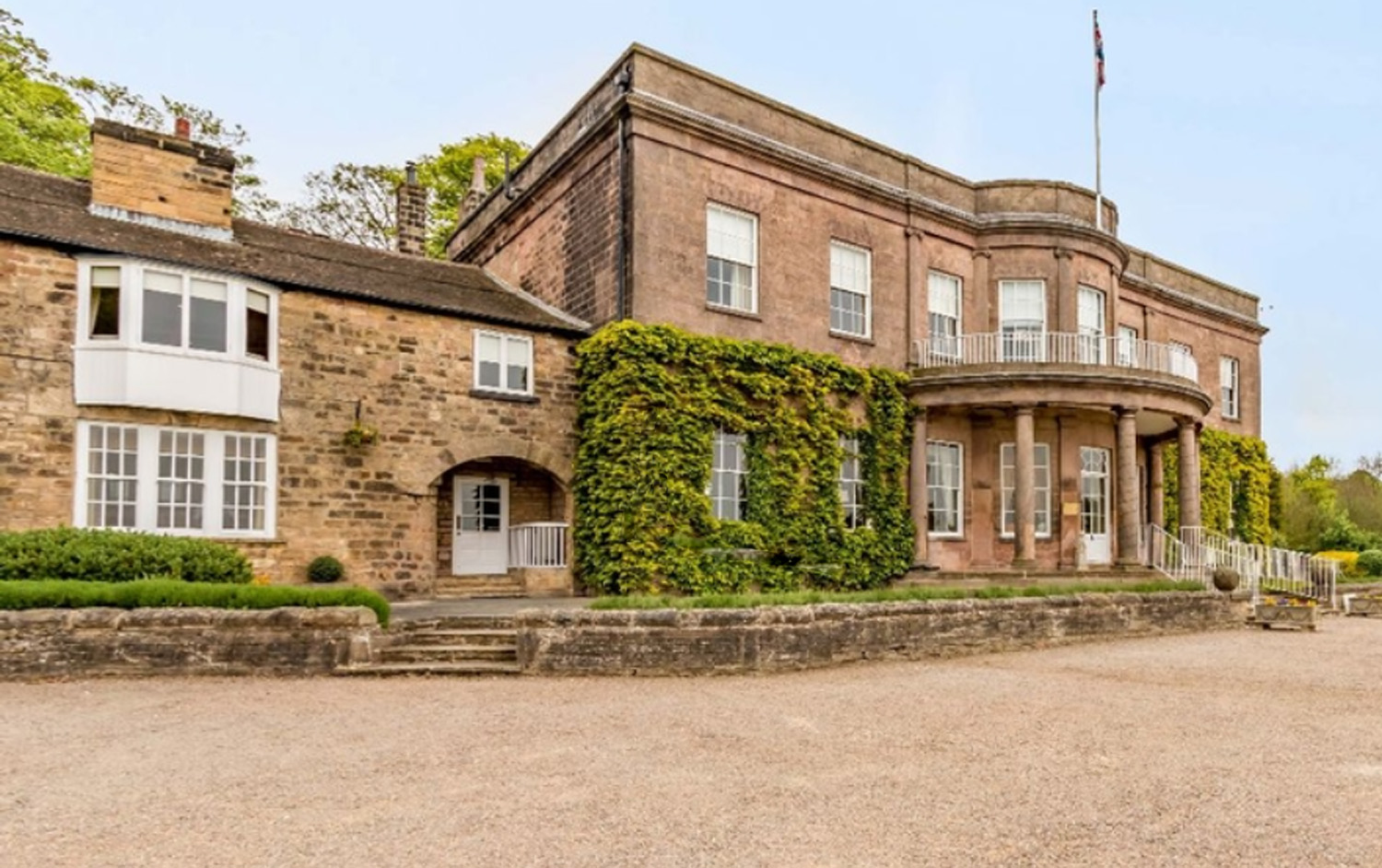
- Interactive map of the Wood Hall Hotel & Spa area
- Former names: Wood Hall

General information
- Type: Hotel
- Location: Trip Lane, Wetherby, England
- Elevation: 51 metres (167 ft)
- Owner: Hand Picked Hotels

Technical details
- Floor count: 2
Wood Hall
- Interactive map of Wood Hall
- 53.916°N 1.439°W
- Type: Mansion
History
- Built: 1750
Listed Building
- Official name: Grade II
- Designated: February 22, 1985
- Reference no.: 1149975

Wood Hall Hotel and Spa, Trip Lane, is an AA four-star, 44-room country house hotel with an AA two-rosette restaurant, about one mile from the English village of Linton, West Yorkshire. A Grade II listed building that was once owned by the Vavasour and Scott families.

== History ==
The house was originally a country retreat of the Catholic Vavasour family, which had owned the estate since the early Middle Ages. An earlier house by the river was destroyed in the English Civil War by Cromwell's army and the stones thrown in the river. The present one was erected about 1750 and was designed by John Carr.

It was sold to the Scott family of Leeds, who inhabited it until 1910 when it was leased to a Mr C. M. Watson, a Morley woollen manufacturer. In 1918 the family sold Wood Hall to Arthur Crowther Watson, a wealthy woollen manufacturer who lived in Morley.It then became a boy's prep school, whose alumni included the Yorkshire and England cricketer Len Hutton.

The 190-acre estate was sold in 1966 to the Roman Catholic Diocese of Leeds as a pastoral and ecumenical centre, in which capacity it was visited by Mother Teresa. There is still a community of Carmelite nuns in a modern house near Wood Hall.

In 1910, architects Connon & Chorley of Leeds were commissioned by Mr C. Watson to make some changes to the layout of the Hall. It shows that the Hall consisted of a cellar and two floors with a small mezzanine and an attic.

=== The Scott family ===
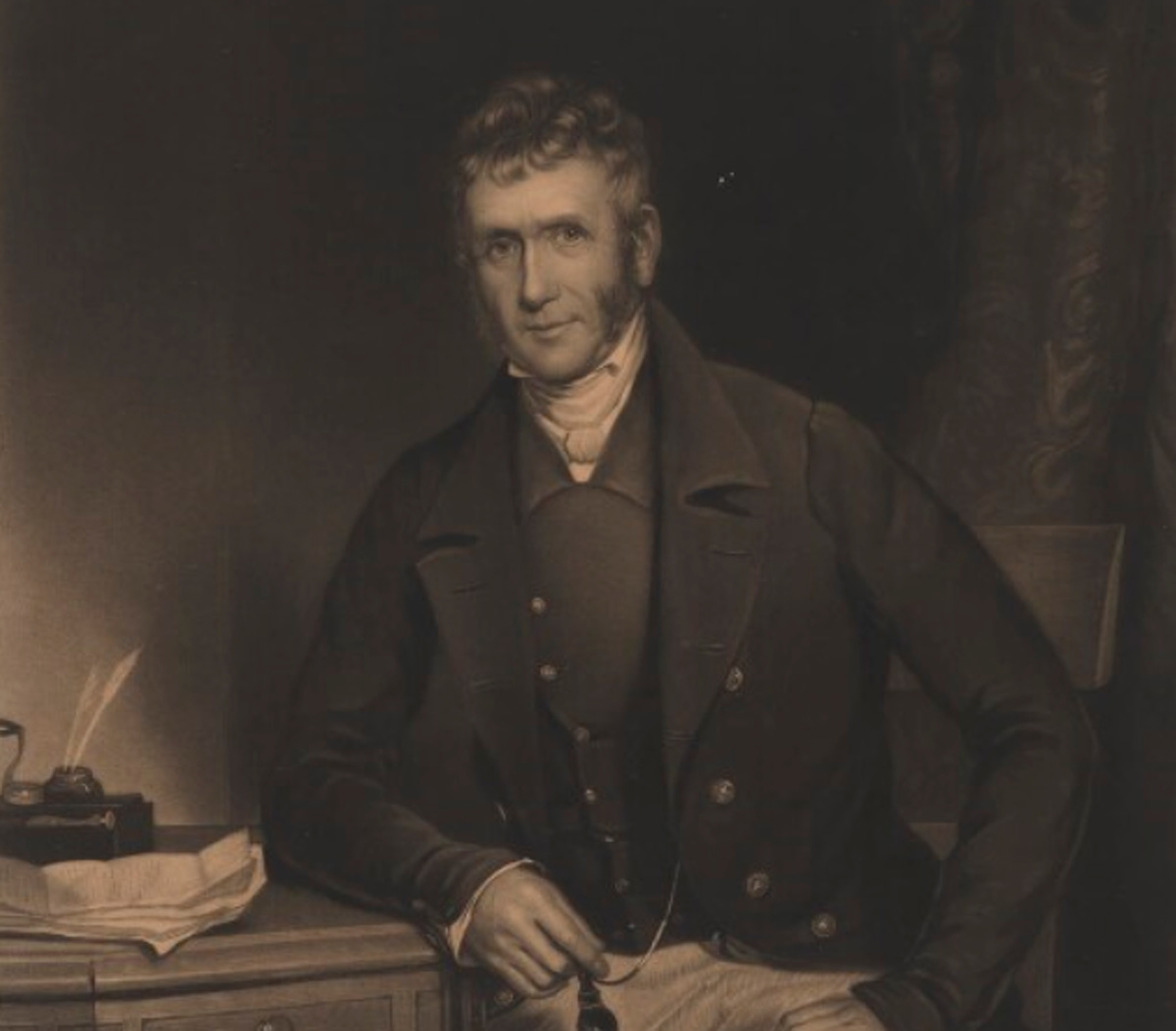
William Lister Fenton Scott (1781–1842)

The Scott family bought Wood Hall in about 1790. It was advertised for sale in 1786 by the then owner Sir Walter Vavasour 6th Baronet. Edward Whatmore bought the house but he died the following year. Soon after it was purchased by William Fenton Scott, who was born in 1746.

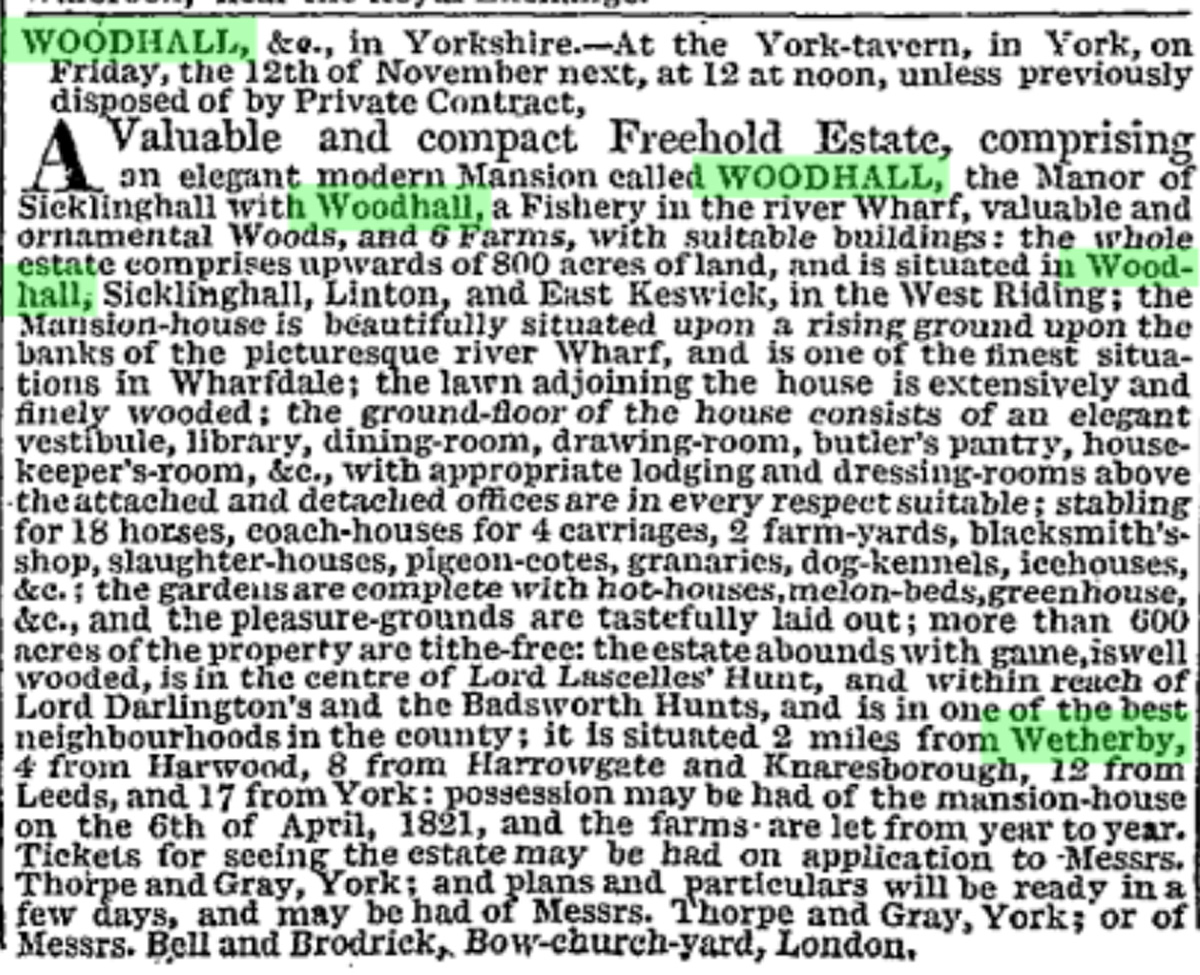
Sale advert for Wood Hall in 1819

Scott's father was Henry Scott, a wealthy merchant and landowner who was the Mayor of Leeds. In 1779 he married Mary Kaye the sister of Sir John Lister Kaye. In 1890 when his father died he inherited the family estates and two years later founded the Commercial Bank in Leeds. He died in 1813 and his eldest son William Lister Fenton Scott inherited Wood Hall. He advertised the estate for sale in 1818, but decided not to sell it.

William Lister Fenton Scott (1781–1842) was born in 1781 in Leeds. In 1821 he married Charlotte Johnstone who was the daughter of Sir Richard Vanden Bempde Johnstone. In 1825 he was elected as the Registrar of the West Riding and held this position for 16 years. The couple had no children and when William died in 1842 he left Wood Hall to his wife Charlotte. She lived there until her death in 1860. During this time she took an interest in the welfare of the community: in 1850 she built a school at Sicklinghall at her own expense. When she died, her nephew Henry Richard Johnstone inherited the Scott estates, including Wood Hall. In accordance with their wishes he added the name Scott to his title so that he became Henry Richard Johnstone Scott.

Henry Richard Johnstone Scott was born in 1830. He was for some time in the 2nd Regiment of the West Yorkshire Militia. In 1866 he married Cressida Elizabeth Selby Lowndes, the daughter of William Selby Lowndes of Whadden Hall in Buckinghamshire. The couple had three sons and a daughter. Henry died in 1912 and in 1918 the family sold Wood Hall to Arthur Crowther Watson, a wealthy woollen manufacturer who lived in Morley.

=== Present day ===
Also known as Wood Hall Country House Hotel, the house is set in 100 acres (40.5 ha) of woodland, at the end of a long private drive, 200 yards from the River Wharfe. It opened as a hotel in 1988 and was extended in 1992. It has facilities for helicopter landing, and also a gym, an indoor swimming pool and a steam room.

Some of the stonework of the previous house was recovered from the river during its repurposing into a hotel and the House of York coat of arms is displayed in the front hall.

== See also ==
- Listed buildings in Sicklinghall
