= Villa Thiene =

Coordinates: 45°34′22.30″N 11°37′30″E

UNESCO World Heritage Site
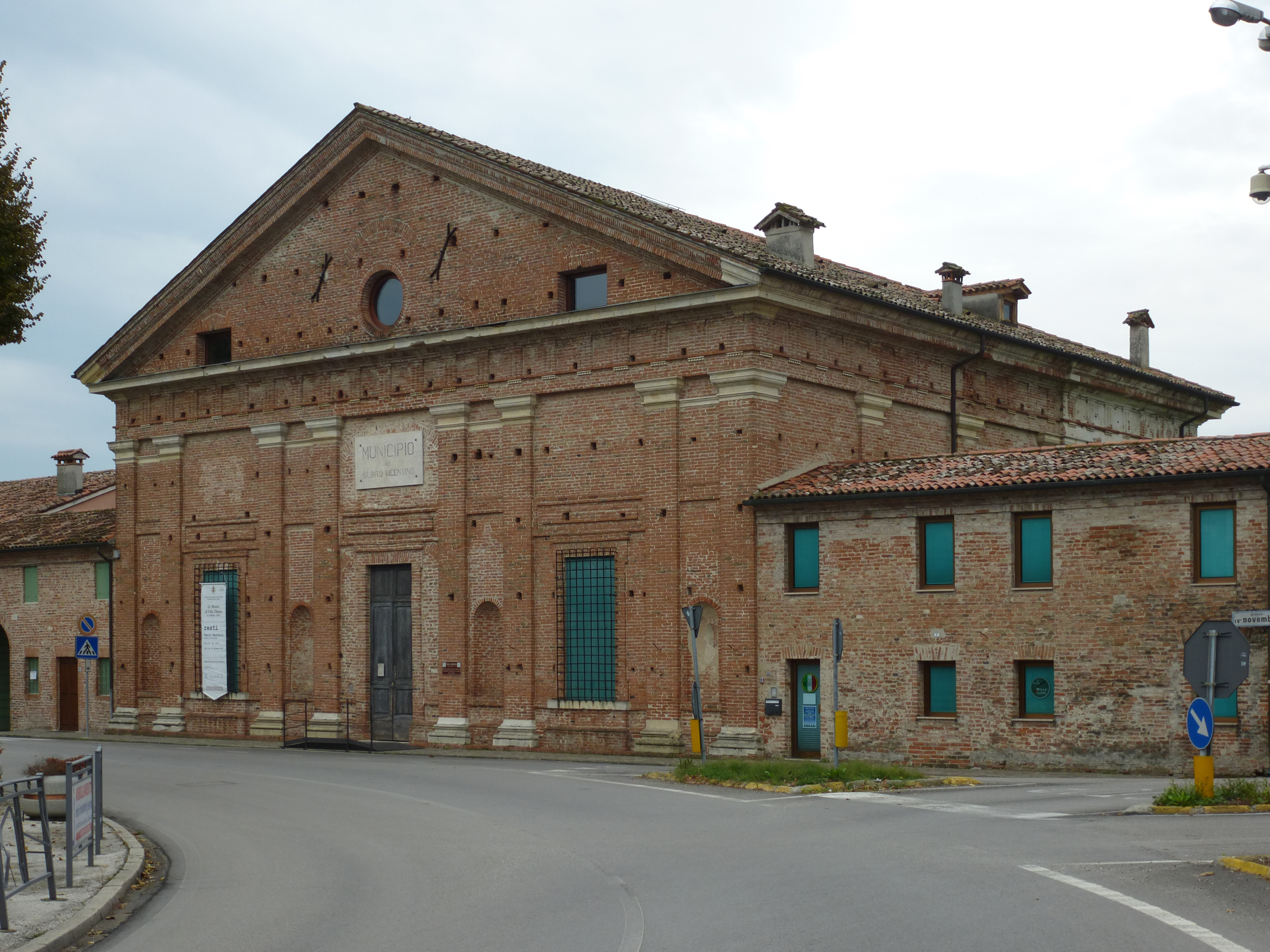
- Villa Thiene

- Location within Veneto Location within Italy
- Location: Quinto Vicentino, Province of Vicenza, Veneto, Italy
- Part of: City of Vicenza and the Palladian Villas of the Veneto
- Criteria: Cultural: (i), (ii)
- Reference: 712bis-013
- Inscription: 1994 (18th Session)
- Extensions: 1996

Villa Thiene is a 16th-century villa at Quinto Vicentino in the province of Vicenza. The building as it stands today is the work of several architects one of whom was Andrea Palladio. Like several other projects on which Palladio worked, it was commissioned by two brothers, in this case Marcantonio and Adriano Thiene. Since 1996, the villa has been conserved as part of a World Heritage Site, the "City of Vicenza and the Palladian Villas of the Veneto". The World Heritage Site also includes the Palazzo Thiene in the city of Vicenza, which belonged to same Thiene brothers.

== History ==
Palladio was involved with Villa Thiene in the 1540s, making it one of his earlier works. He appears to have adapted a design by Giulio Romano. The extent of Romano's involvement in the project is not clear, in any case he died in Mantua in 1546 while the villa was still under construction. One of the Thiene brothers, Adriano Thiene, had to flee Vicenza in 1547 and building work appears to have been put on hold at that time.

== Architecture ==
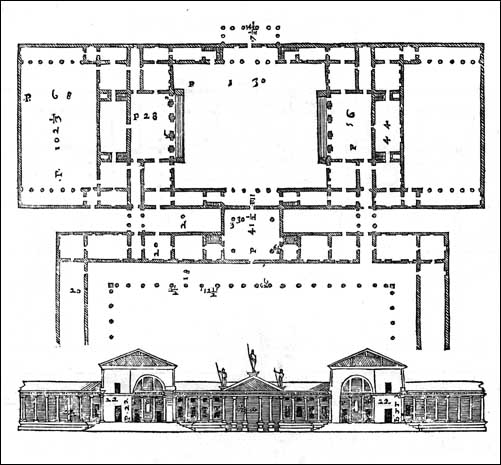
Design by Palladio for the villa (mainly unrealized), from I quattro libri dell'architettura

A version of the villa is illustrated and discussed in I quattro libri dell'architettura of 1570. As with a number of the villas described in Palladio's treatise, there are differences between what was published and what was actually built. Palladio's plan indicates that the present building was not intended for the mansion itself, but for one of the agricultural wings. However, there are sixteenth-century frescoes in the building by Giovanni de Mio, suggesting that it was decided at an early state that the building would not be purely utilitarian.

The plan shows two courtyards which were never completed. Courtyards are rather unusual among Palladio's villas, but the architect also proposed courtyards for Villa Serego, another incomplete villa, where one of the courtyards was partially constructed.

The front and rear facades have been modified since the sixteenth century: the front facade is probably the closer to Palladio's intentions, although the brickwork would originally have been rendered. The many holes were apparently done during wartime, to extract metal used within the villa's construction.

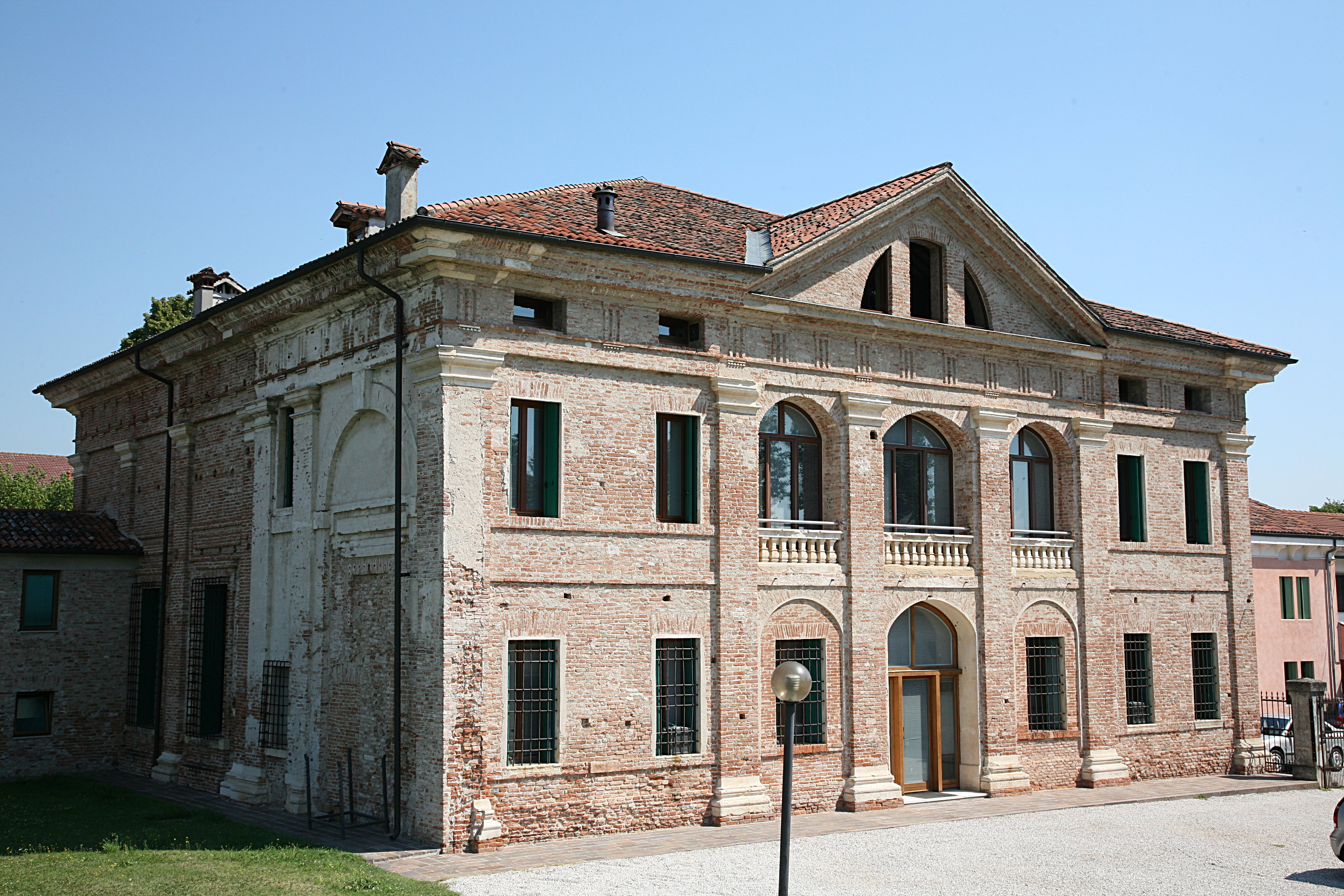
Rear facade; it debatable how much of the design is attributable to Palladio, but there is Palladian detailing visible on the left-hand side of the building.

The garden facade of Villa Thiene has been attributed to eighteenth-century architect Francesco Muttoni. Both the thermal window in the concluding gable and portals in the centre part are displeasing. These elements cannot be reconciled with Palladio's formal idiom.

== See also ==
- Palladian Villas of Veneto
- Palladian architecture
- Palazzo Thiene
