= The Christmas Adventure =

Seasonal event held in North Yorkshire, England

- Begins: November
- Ends: mid-January
- Frequency: Annually
- Locations: Stockeld Park, Wetherby, Yorkshire, England
- Coordinates: 53.937°N 1.434°W
- Website: www.stockeldpark.co.uk

The Christmas Adventure is a seasonal event held at the 2,000-acre (8.1 km^{2}) Stockeld Park estate in North Yorkshire, England.

Initially a supplement to the estate’s extensive Christmas tree business, The Christmas Adventure now boasts a number of activities, including a giant, snowflake-shaped maze based on the 12 Days of Christmas, an Enchanted Wood, Europe’s longest synthetic Nordic ski trail, a skating rink and Santa’s Grotto.

The Enchanted Wood is perhaps The Christmas Adventure’s most distinctive attraction. Described as “a mixture of theatre and fantasy”, the wood is illuminated by several thousand lights and filled with fairytale characters and animals. Running for over 1,200 metres through the wood is a pathway and the Nordic ski trail.

The Christmas Adventure also contains a Christmas shop and a café.

Since opening in 2006, The Christmas Adventure has been the subject of considerable media attention and has featured in papers such as The Times, The Daily Telegraph, the Guardian and the Yorkshire Post.

Beginning at the start of the October half term and ending after the second weekend of January, it is estimated that over 100,000 people visit The Christmas Adventure, which has been the recipient of a number of awards.
