= Palazzo Thiene =

UNESCO World Heritage Site
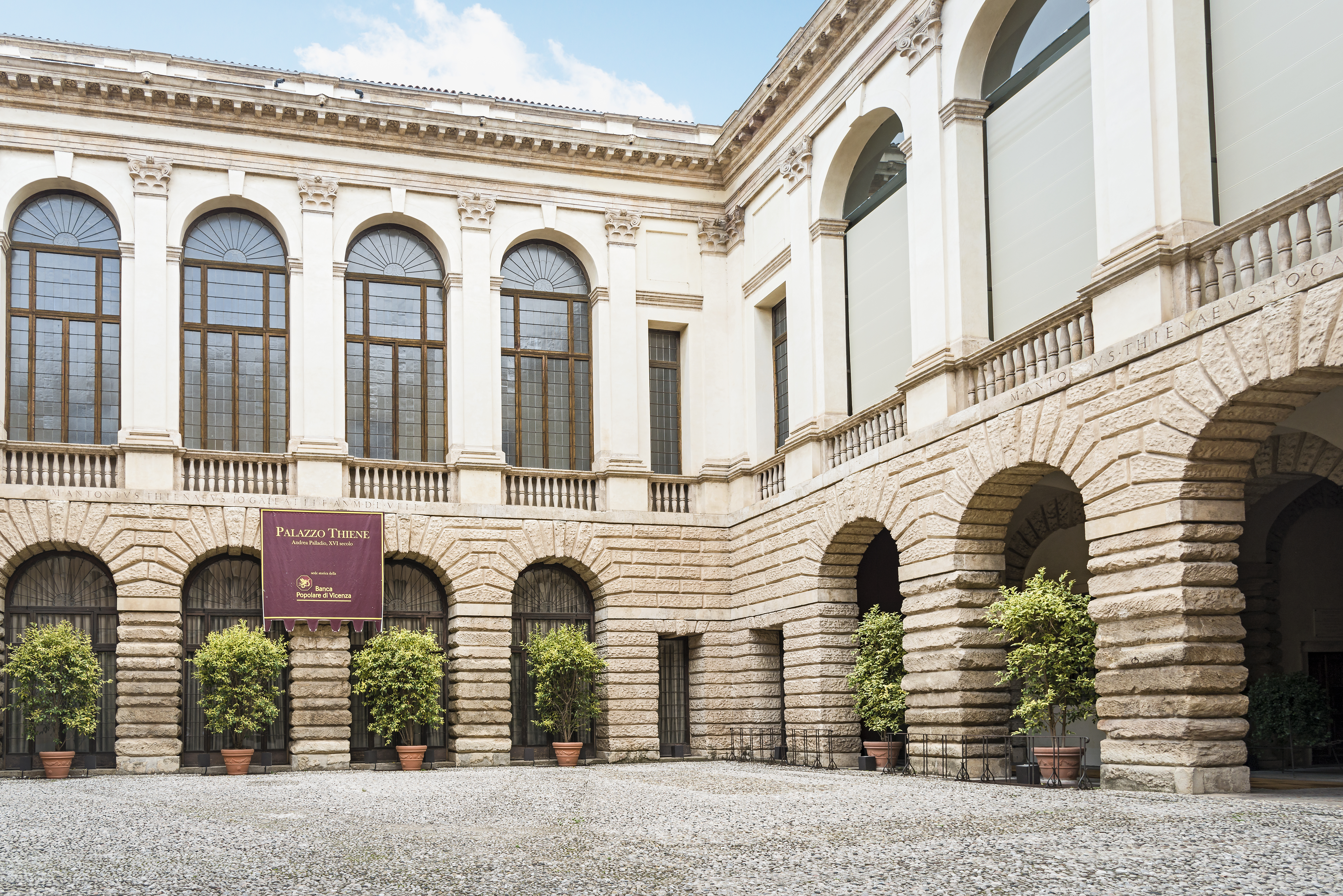
- Courtyard of the Palazzo Thiene

- Location within Veneto Location within Italy
- Location: Vicenza, Veneto, Italy
- Part of: "City of Vicenza" part of City of Vicenza and the Palladian Villas of the Veneto
- Criteria: Cultural: (i)(ii)
- Reference: 712bis-001
- Inscription: 1994 (18th Session)
- Extensions: 1996
- Coordinates: 45°32′54″N 11°32′46″E

Palazzo Thiene is a 15th-16th-century palace in Vicenza, northern Italy, designed for Marcantonio and Adriano Thiene, probably by Giulio Romano, in 1542, and revised during construction from 1544 by Andrea Palladio.

In 1994, the palace was included in the "Vicenza, city of Palladio" World Heritage Site by UNESCO. In 1996, the World Heritage Site was renamed "City of Vicenza and the Palladian Villas of the Veneto", and it was expanded to include outlying villas (one of which is the Thiene brothers' country home, the Villa Thiene). The palace is used as the historic headquarters of a bank and it also hosts some exhibitions and culture events.

The palazzo was the headquarters of Banca Popolare di Vicenza.

== History ==
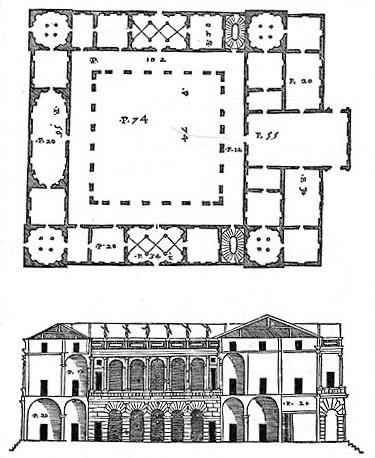
Floor plan and section by Palladio, from I quattro libri dell'architettura, Venice 1570

The original Gothic palace was committed by Lodovico Thiene to Lorenzo da Bologna in 1490, with an East front made of bricks squared by angular lesenes worked at "diamond edge", with a portal by Tommaso da Lugano and a triple window (trifora) made in rose marble.

In October 1542, Marcantonio and Adriano Thiene began to remodel their 15th century (Quattrocento) family palace in a grandiose project, which would have occupied an entire city block of 54 x 62 metres and faced onto Vicenza's principal artery (today's Corso Palladio).

The rich, powerful and sophisticated Thiene brothers belonged to that great Italian nobility which could move with ease among Europe's most important courts; they therefore required a domestic stage adequate for the cosmopolitan expectations of their guests who might visit them. At the same time, as exponents of a well-defined, political faction in the city's aristocracy, they desired a princely palace to emphasise their proper role in the city itself, as the sign of their quasi-seigniorial power.

When in 1614 the young English architect Inigo Jones visited the palace, he noted down information directly garnered from Vincenzo Scamozzi and Palma il Giovane: "this project was made by Giulio Romano and executed by Palladio". Most probably, in fact, the original conception of the Palazzo Thiene should be attributed to the mature and expert Giulio Romano (from 1573 at the Mantuan court of the Gonzagas, with whom the Thiene enjoyed the closest rapport) and the young Palladio should be held responsible rather for the executive design and execution of the building, a role which became ever more essential after Giulio's death in 1546.

The elements of the palace, which are attributable to Giulio and alien to Palladio's vocabulary, are clearly recognisable: the four-column atrium is substantially identical with that of the Palazzo Te (even if Palladio indubitably modified its vaulting system); also Giulian are the windows and the ground storey façades onto the street and courtyard, while Palladio must have been defined the upper storey trabeation and capitals.

Works began on the building in 1542. In December of the same year, Giulio Romano visited Vicenza for two weeks as a consultant on the loggias for the Basilica. Probably on this occasion he supplied the outline project for the Palazzo Thiene. But works proceeded slowly: on the external façade is inscribed the date 1556, and in the courtyard 1558. In 1552, Adriano Thiene died in France and thereafter, when Marcantonio's son Giulio became marchese of Scandiano, family interests gradually shifted to Ferrara. As a result, only a small portion of the grandiose project was ever realised, but probably neither the Venetians nor the other Vicentine nobles would have accepted such a grandiose private enclave in the centre of their city.

== Gallery ==
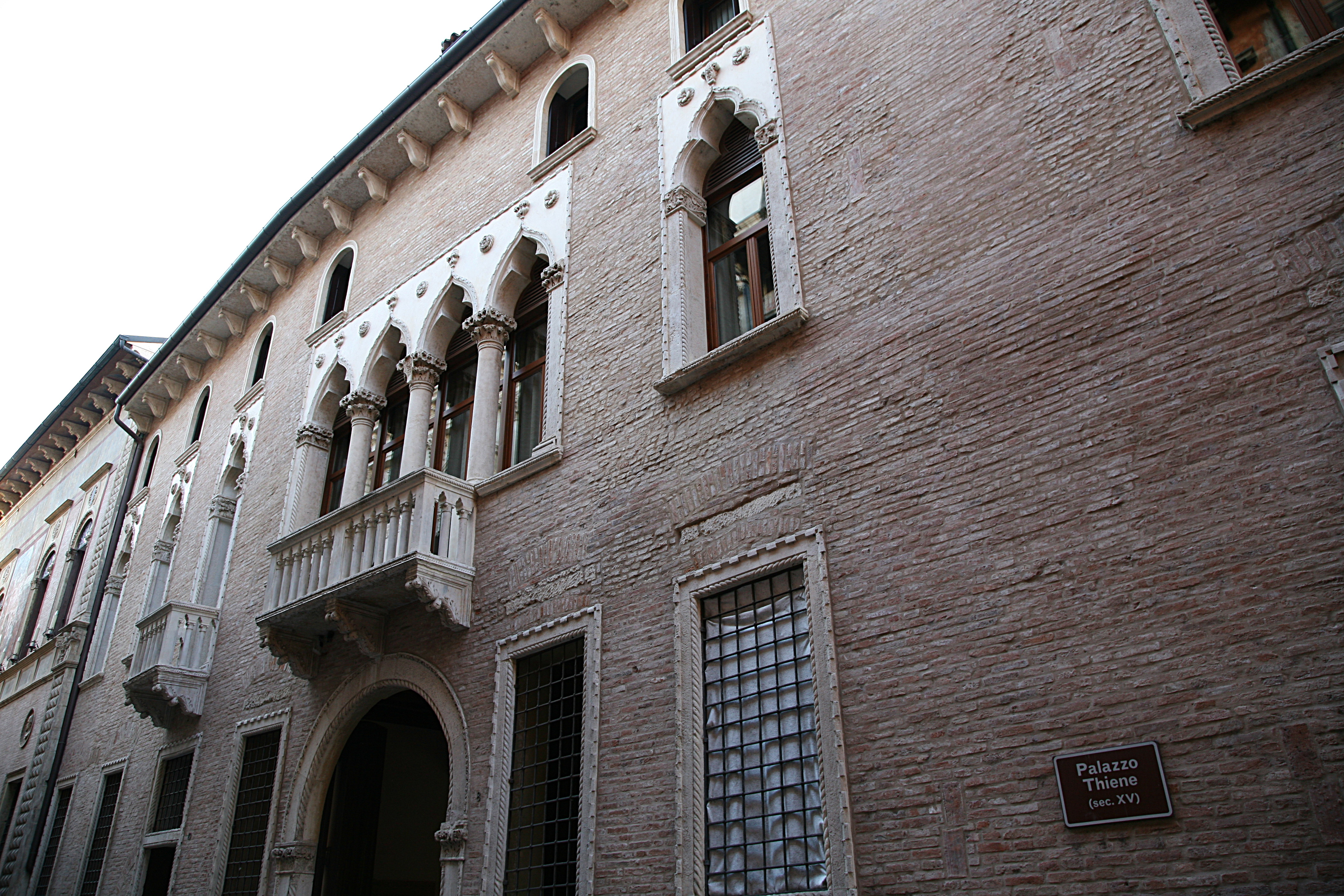
The Gothic façade of the palace, facing on Contra' Porti

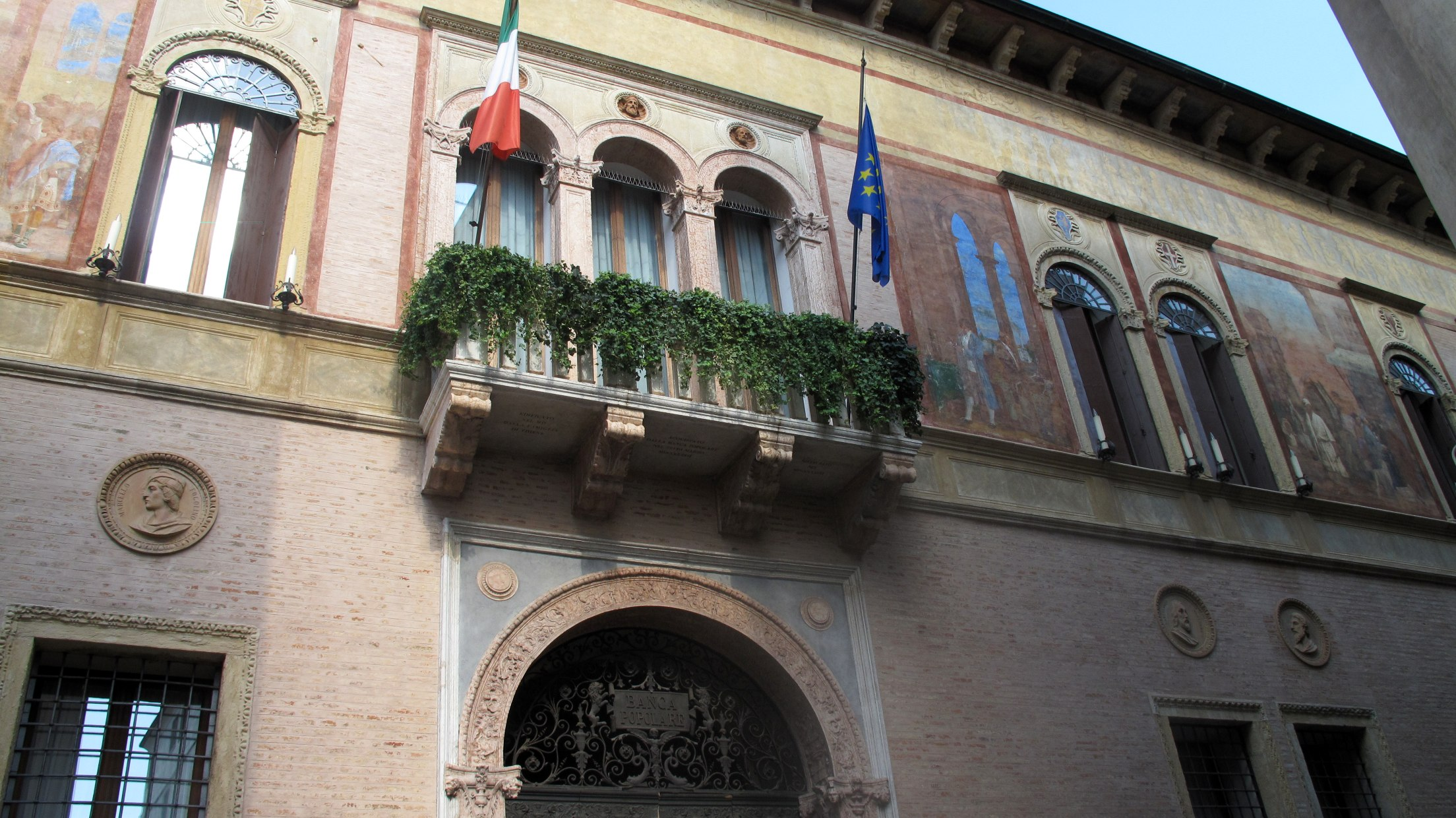
The Gothic façade of the palace, facing on Contra' Porti

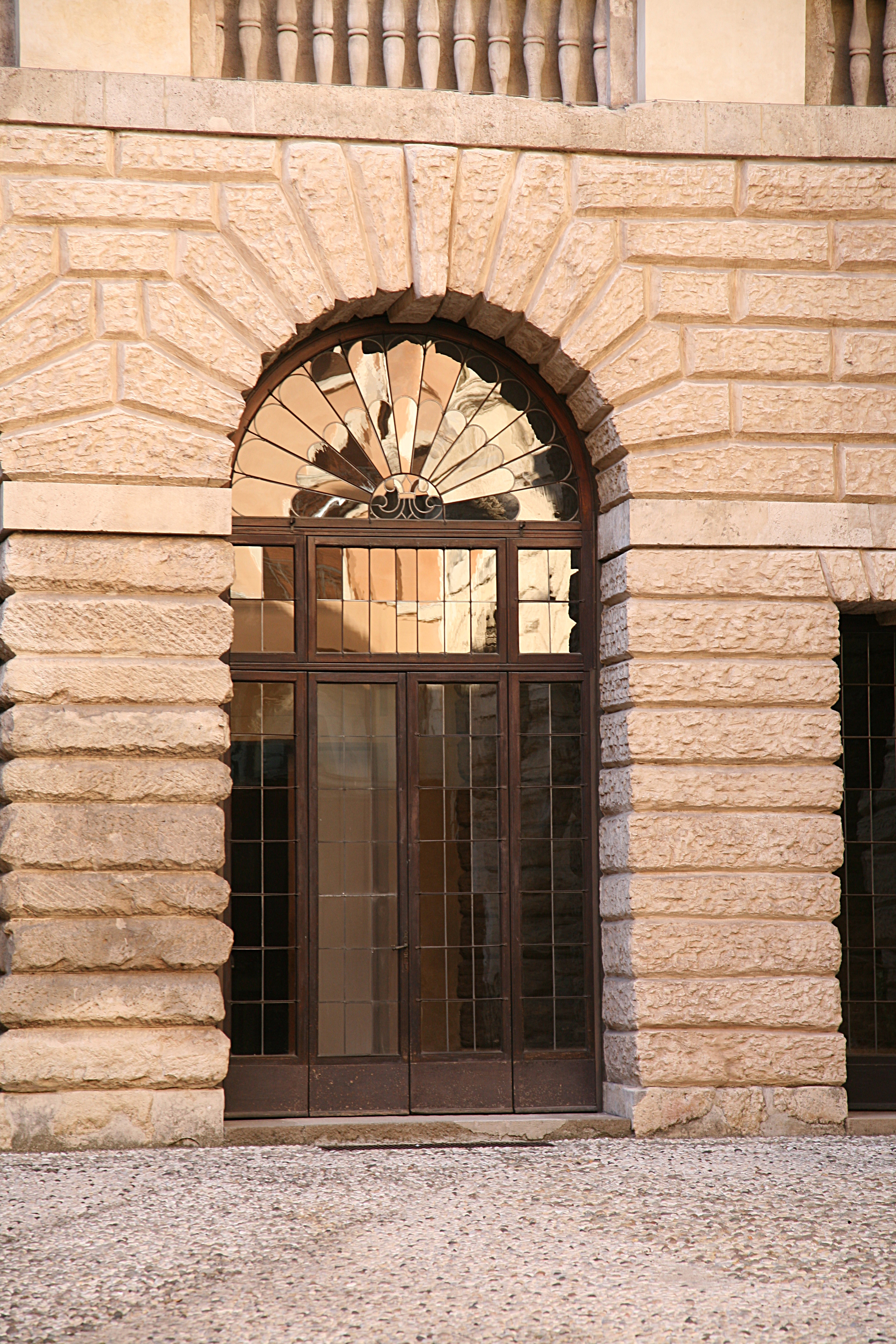
The entrance from the 16th century façade

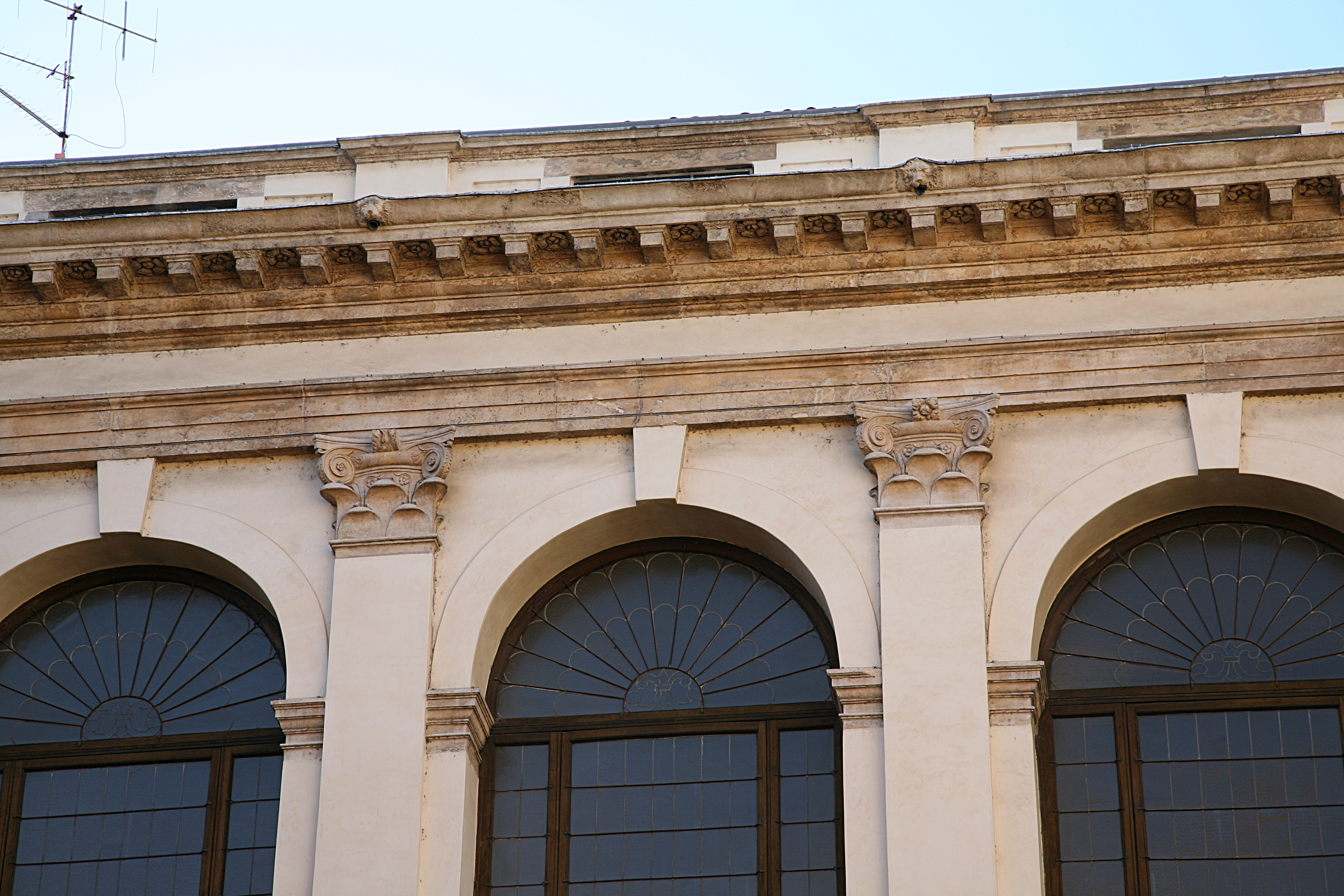
Detail of the upper storey trabeation and capitals, by Palladio

== See also ==
- Villa Thiene

== Sources ==
- Palazzo Thiene in the CISA website (source for the first revision of this article, with kind permission)
