= Gibbs surround =

Architectural feature surrounding a door or window

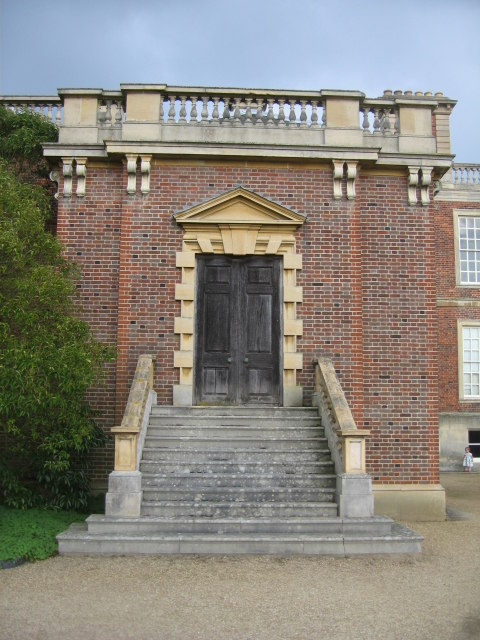
Side door at Wimpole Hall, Cambridgeshire, by James Gibbs

A Gibbs surround or Gibbs Surround is a type of architectural frame surrounding a door, window or niche in the tradition of classical architecture otherwise known as a rusticated doorway or window. The formula is not fixed, but several of the following elements will be found. The door is surrounded by an architrave, or perhaps consists of, or is flanked by, pilasters or columns. These are with "blocking", where rectangular blocks stick out at intervals, usually alternating to represent half the surround. Above the opening there are large rusticated voussoirs and a keystone and a pediment above that. The most essential element is the alternation of blocking with non-blocking elements. Some definitions extend to including arches or square openings merely with alternate blocked elements that continue round the top in the same manner as the sides, as in the rectangular windows of the White House's north front basement level.

Though intended for masonry in stone, the motif can be executed in other materials, especially brick, often masked in stucco, wood, or just paint. British vernacular housing of the late 19th century often uses alternating coloured blocks, with little or no projection from the main wall plane, but emphasized by a different colour from the main wall. These can be seen even on small terraced houses, often using cast stone, and used on both the door and ground floor windows.

== History ==
Gibbs surround is named after the architect James Gibbs, who often used it and popularized it in England, for example at St Martin-in-the-Fields in London. Here the side doors have surrounds with all the details including pediments, while the round-topped windows along the sides have Gibbs surrounds if the broadest definition is used. However, Gibbs certainly did not invent it. The formula can be found in Ancient Roman architecture, and became popular in Renaissance architecture from the early 16th century. Gibbs illustrated a version in his pattern-book A Book of Architecture (1728), though there the blocking stopped at the edge of the architrave. More often the blocking overlies it. This was swiftly plagiarized by rival books such as William Salmon's Palladio Londinensis (1734), which credits Andrea Palladio (d. 1580) with the origin of what Salmon calls a "Rustick Window and door".

The name is mainly used in Britain and other English-speaking countries, where the type was also most popular and long-lasting. As a relatively simple but effective way of ornamenting an opening it was widely used for minor doors or windows in grand buildings, and the main door of more modest ones. The front door of Gibbs' medium-sized country house, Ditchley House, uses the device, which he also used in the Fellows' Building of King's College, Cambridge and Wimpole Hall, Cambridgeshire.

A version with columns rather than a moulded architrave was illustrated by Sebastiano Serlio in 1537, where the voussoirs but not the keystone push up past the bottom edge of the pediment. Variations of this style are seen, for example, in the upper-floor windows of Palazzo Thiene in Vicenza (apparently part of the additions by Palladio), where only the keystone breaks into the pediment. The effect of a Gibbs surround is achieved round the doors of the south front of the Petit Trianon by stopping the horizontally banded rustication short in alternate levels.

Early examples in America, derived from the many English pattern-books used there, include the Aquia Church in Virginia of the 1750s and St. Paul's Chapel in Manhattan, completed in 1766.

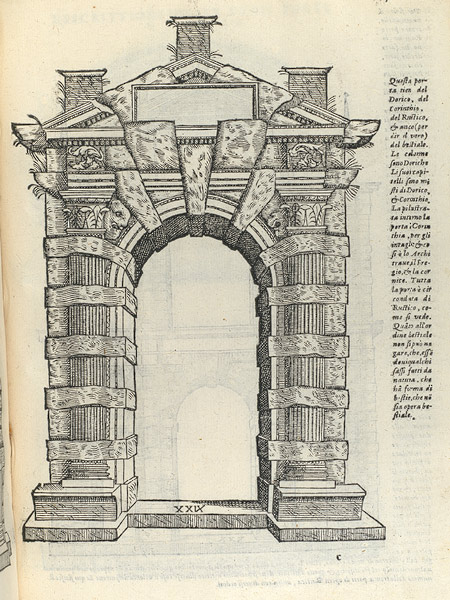
Serlio, rusticated doorway with columns, 1537

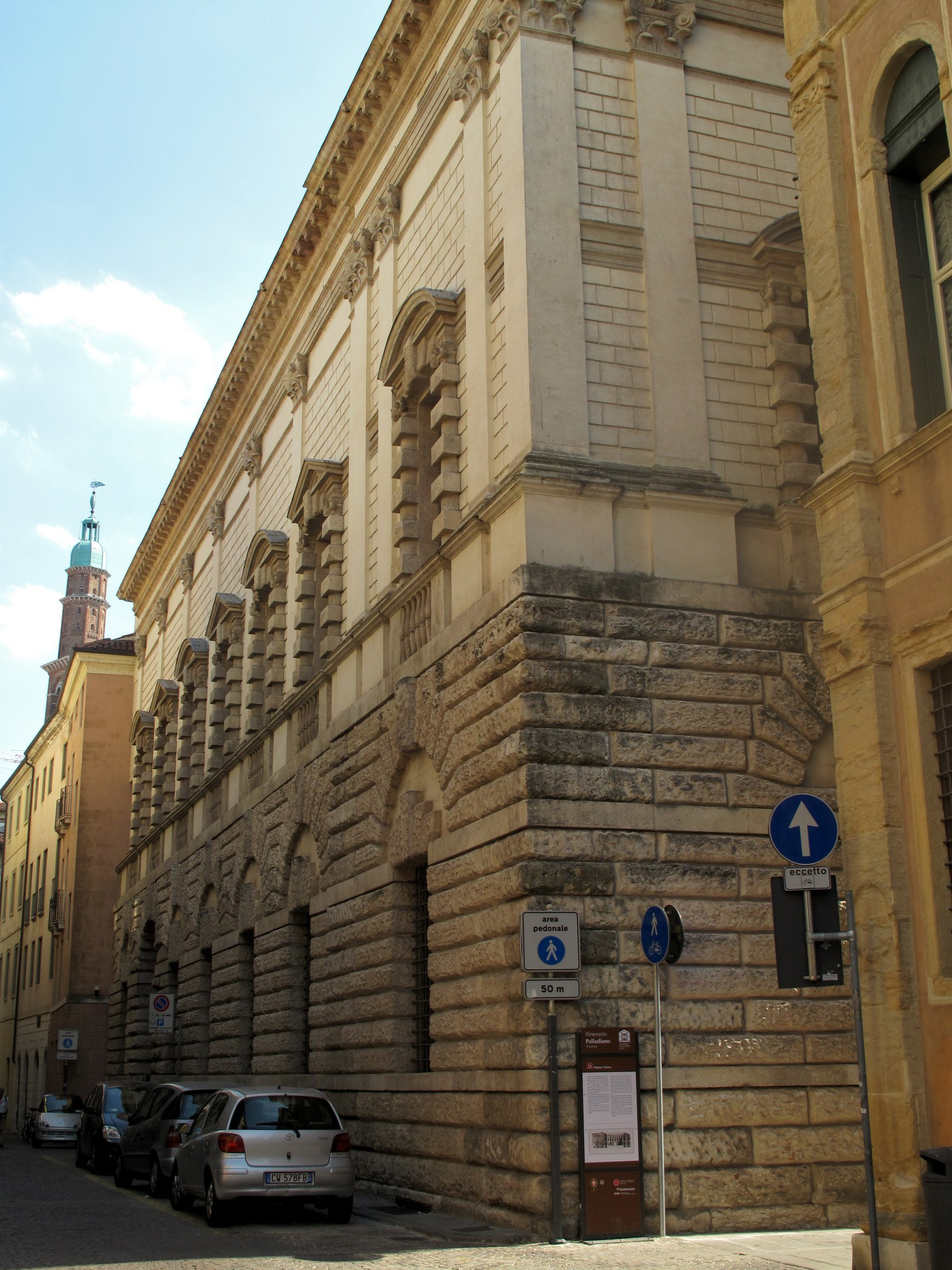
Palazzo Thiene in Vicenza, Palladio, mid-16th century

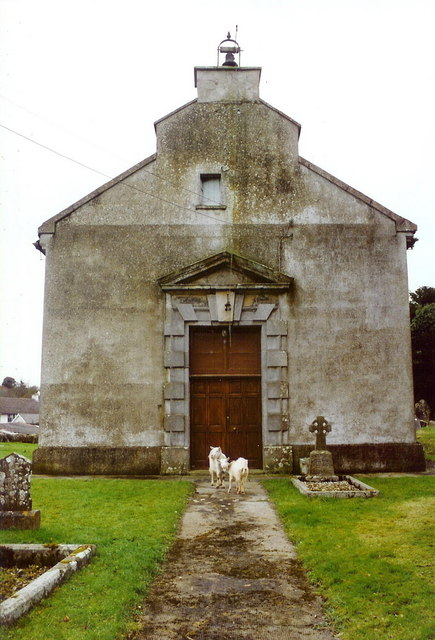
Church door in Ireland with a Gibbs surround

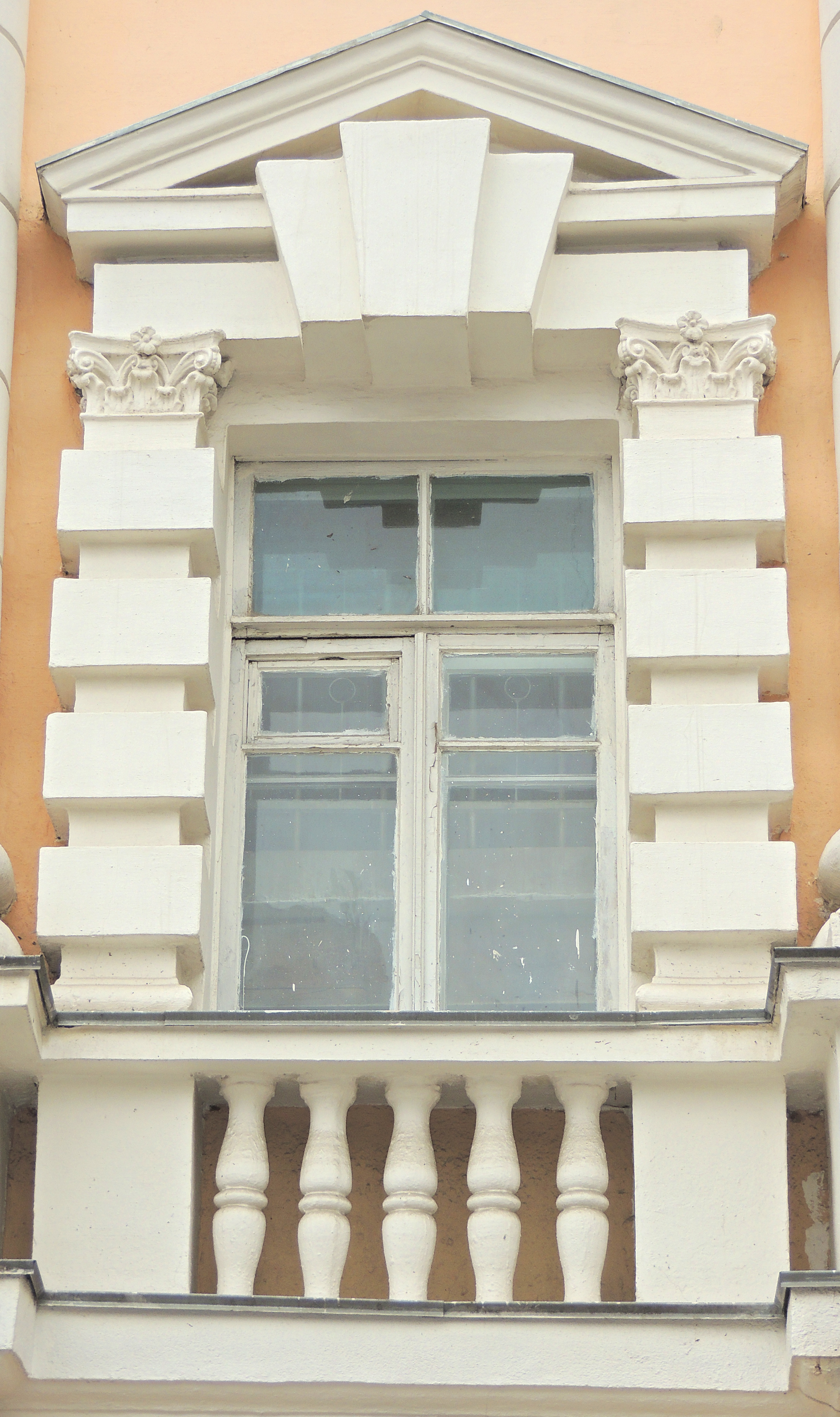
Russian window, Yekaterinburg, using Corinthian pilasters

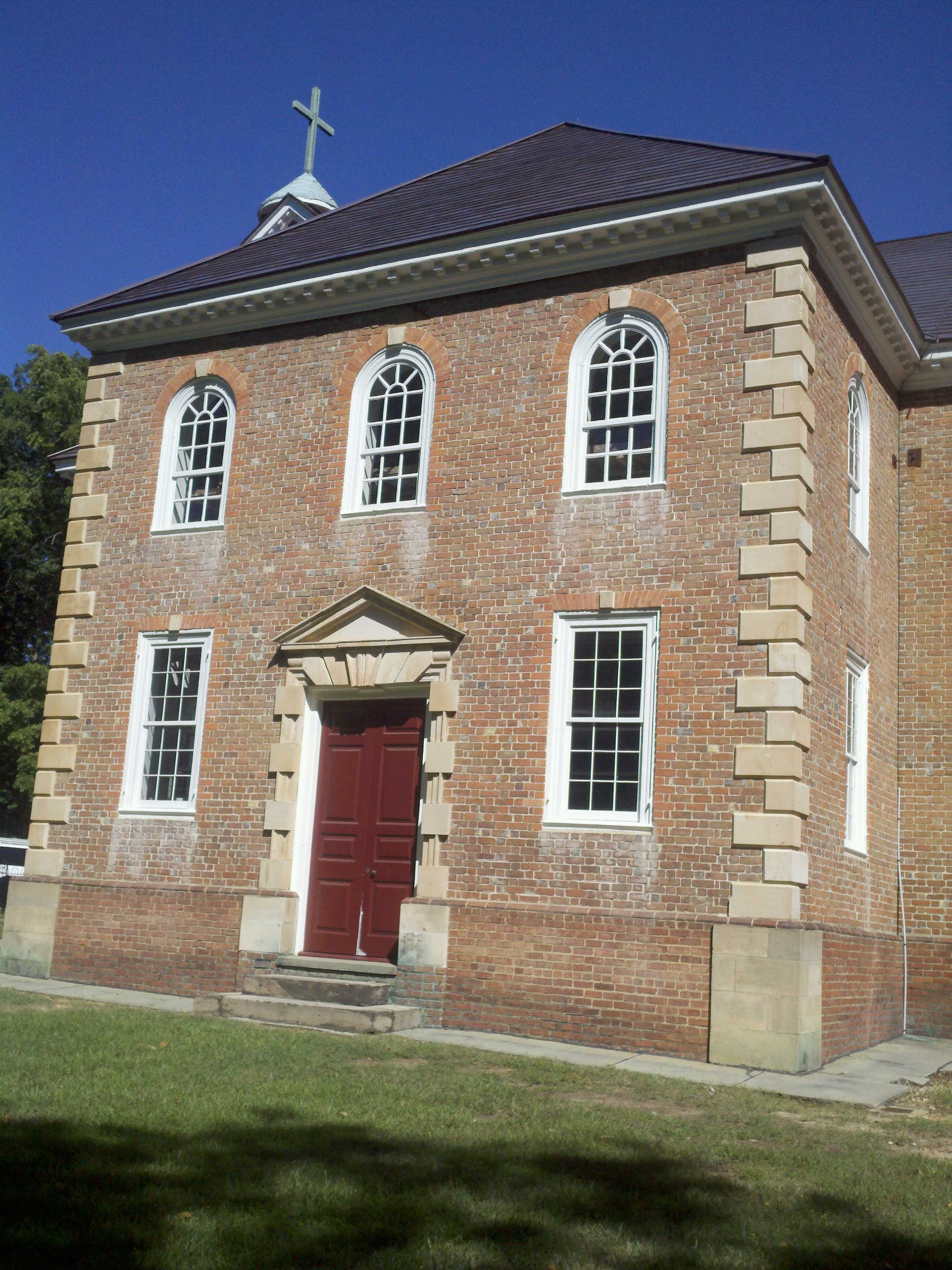
Aquia Church, Virginia, 1750s

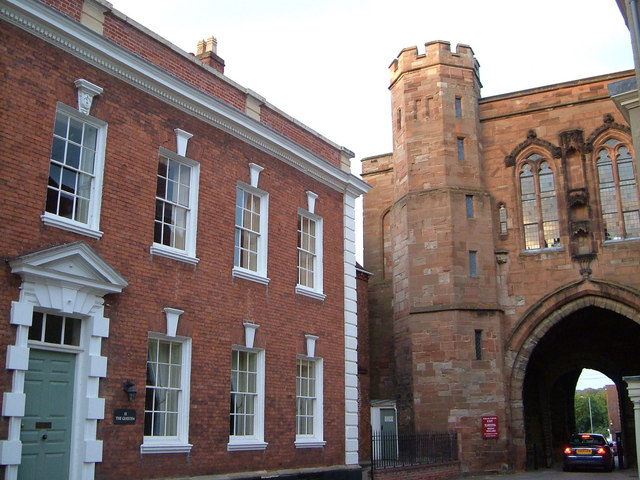
Georgian house in Worcester Cathedral Close

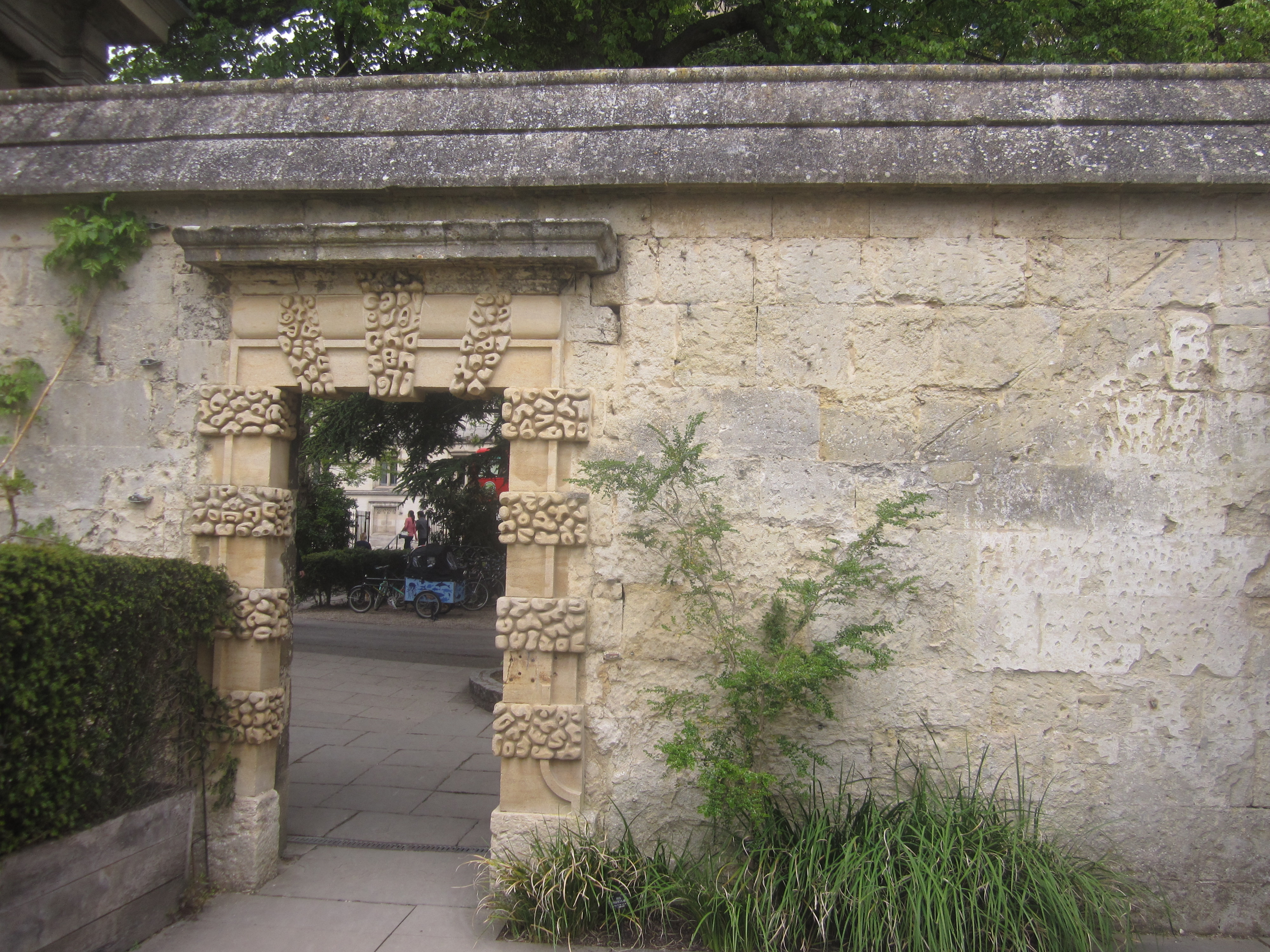
Oxford Botanic Garden; vermiculated blocks, and no room for a pediment, predating Gibbs

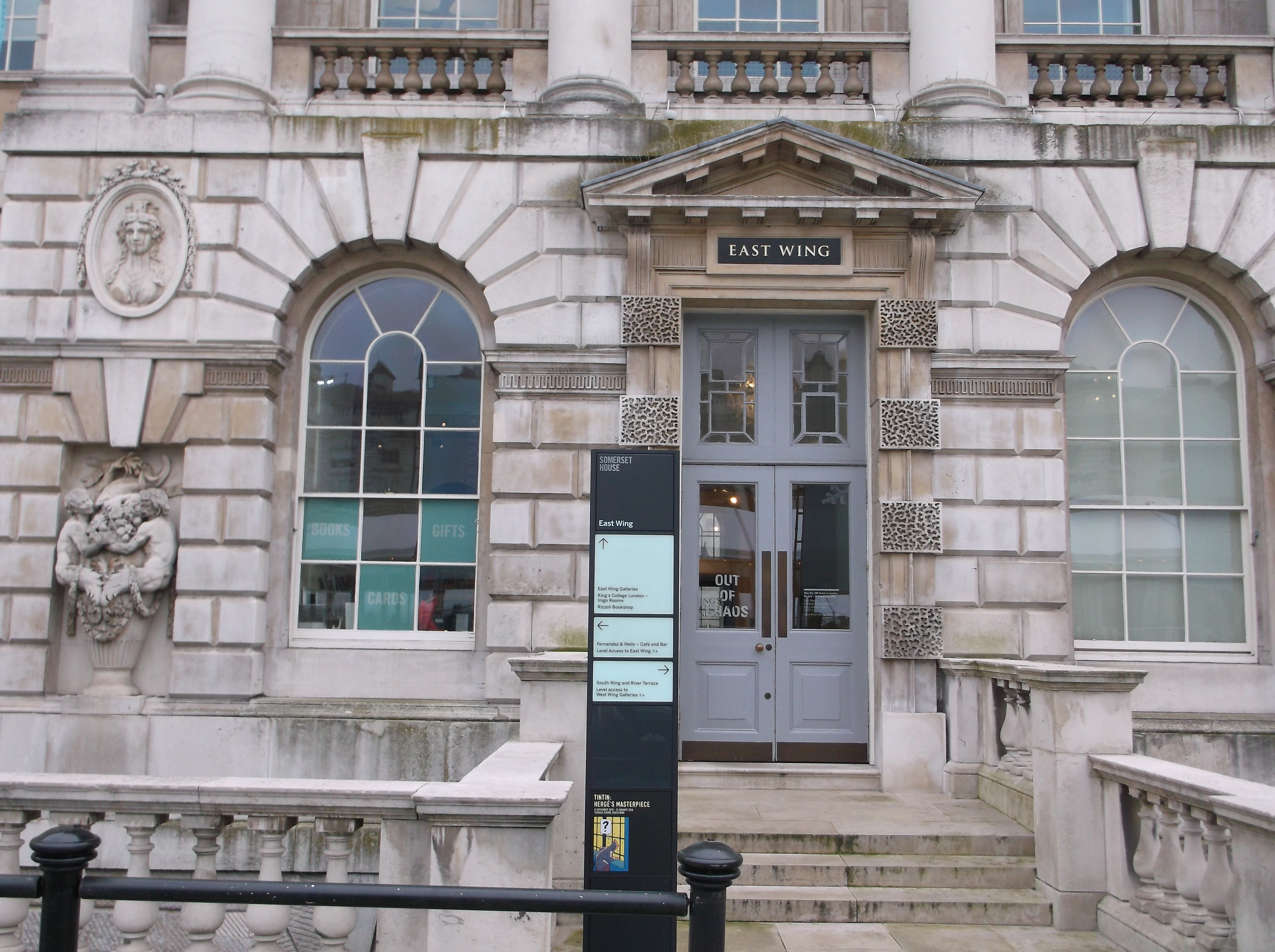
Somerset House, with vermiculated blocks

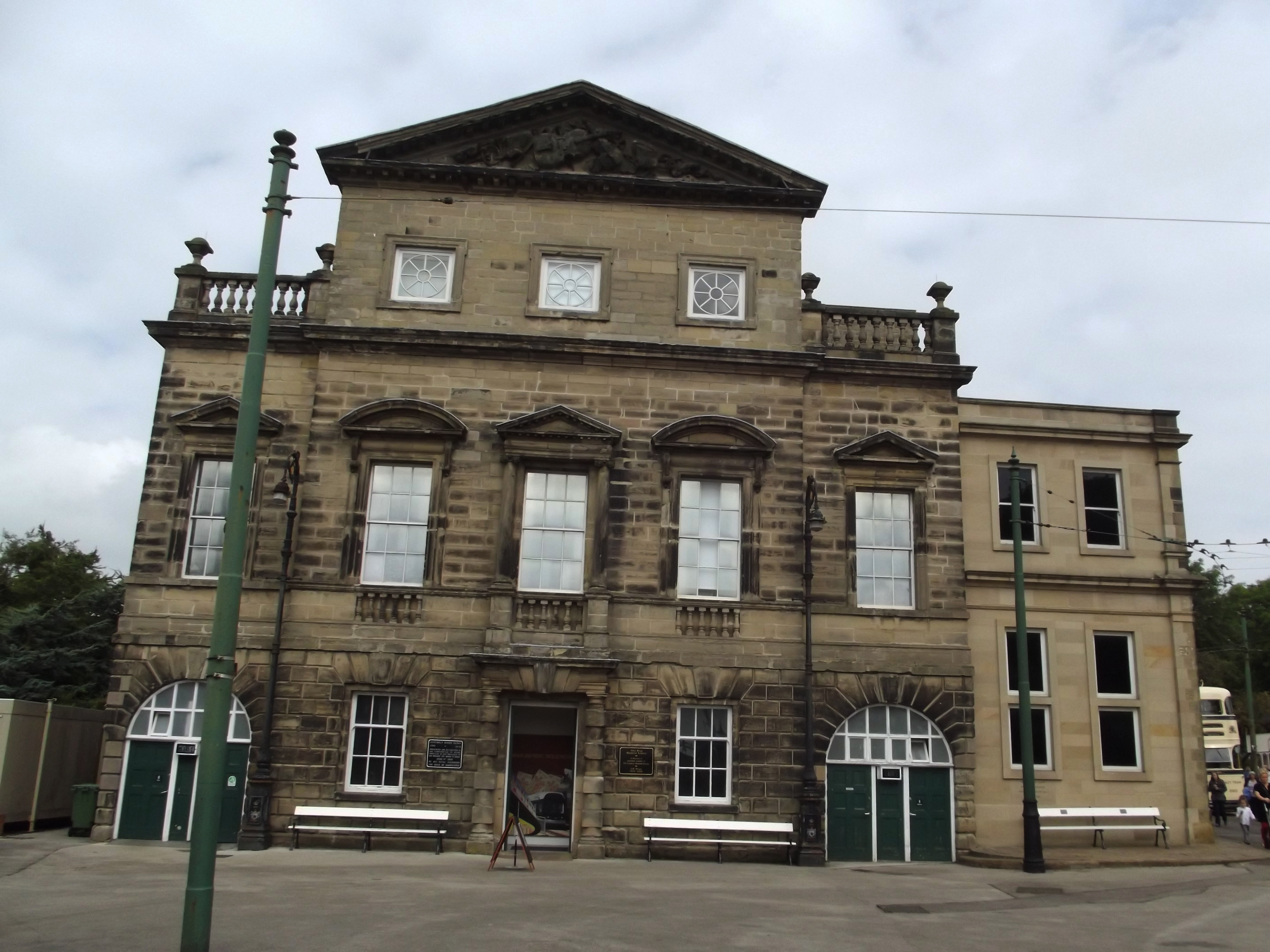
Version with columns, National Tramway Museum. Relocated facade of the old Derby Assembly Rooms, completed 1774.

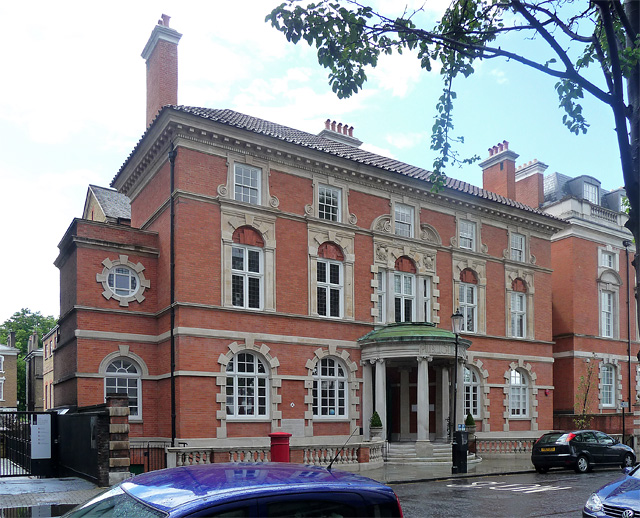
On the broadest definition, the ground floor windows and the upper round window here have Gibbs surrounds

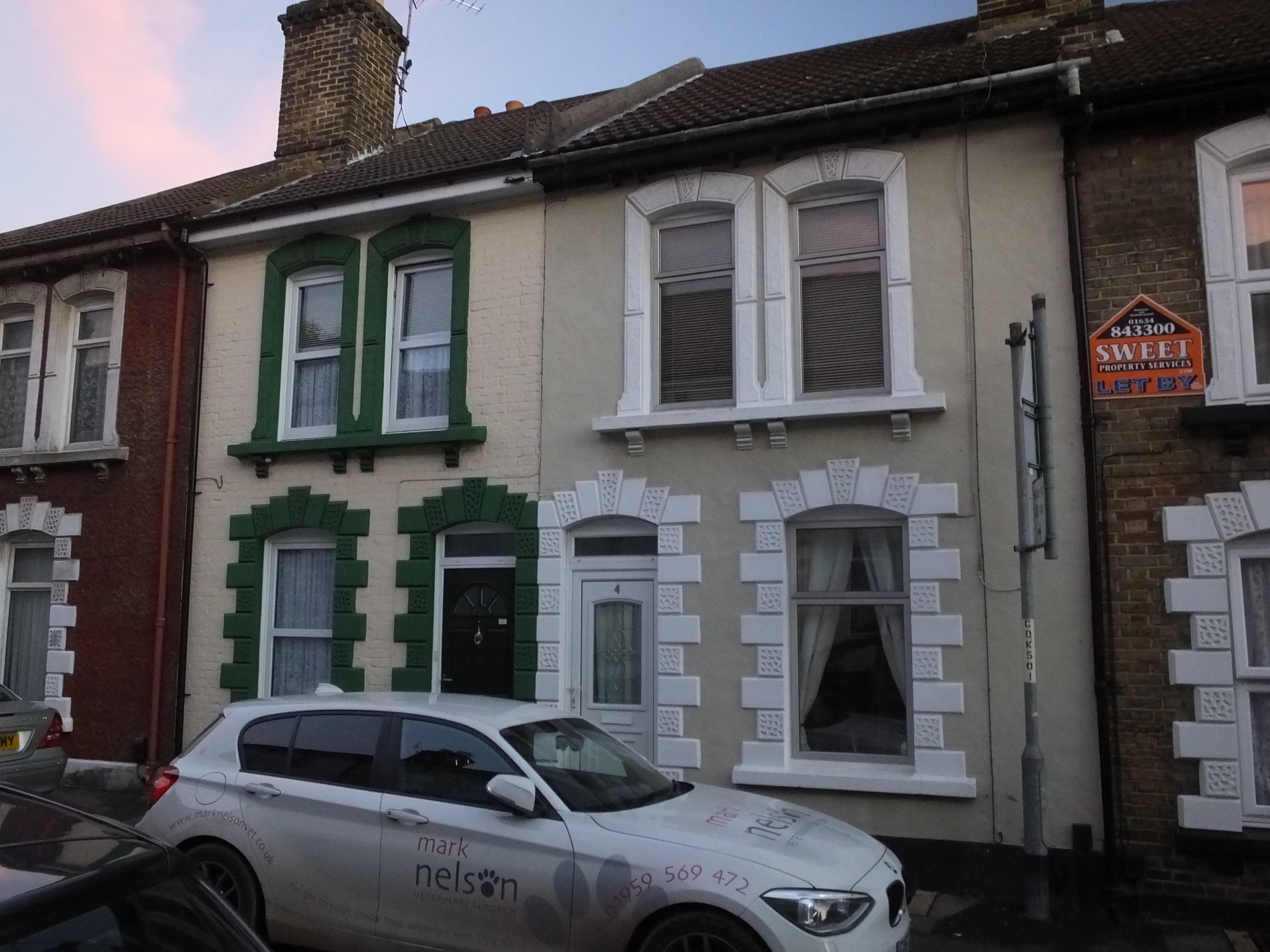
Byelaw terraced house in Strood, using cast stone

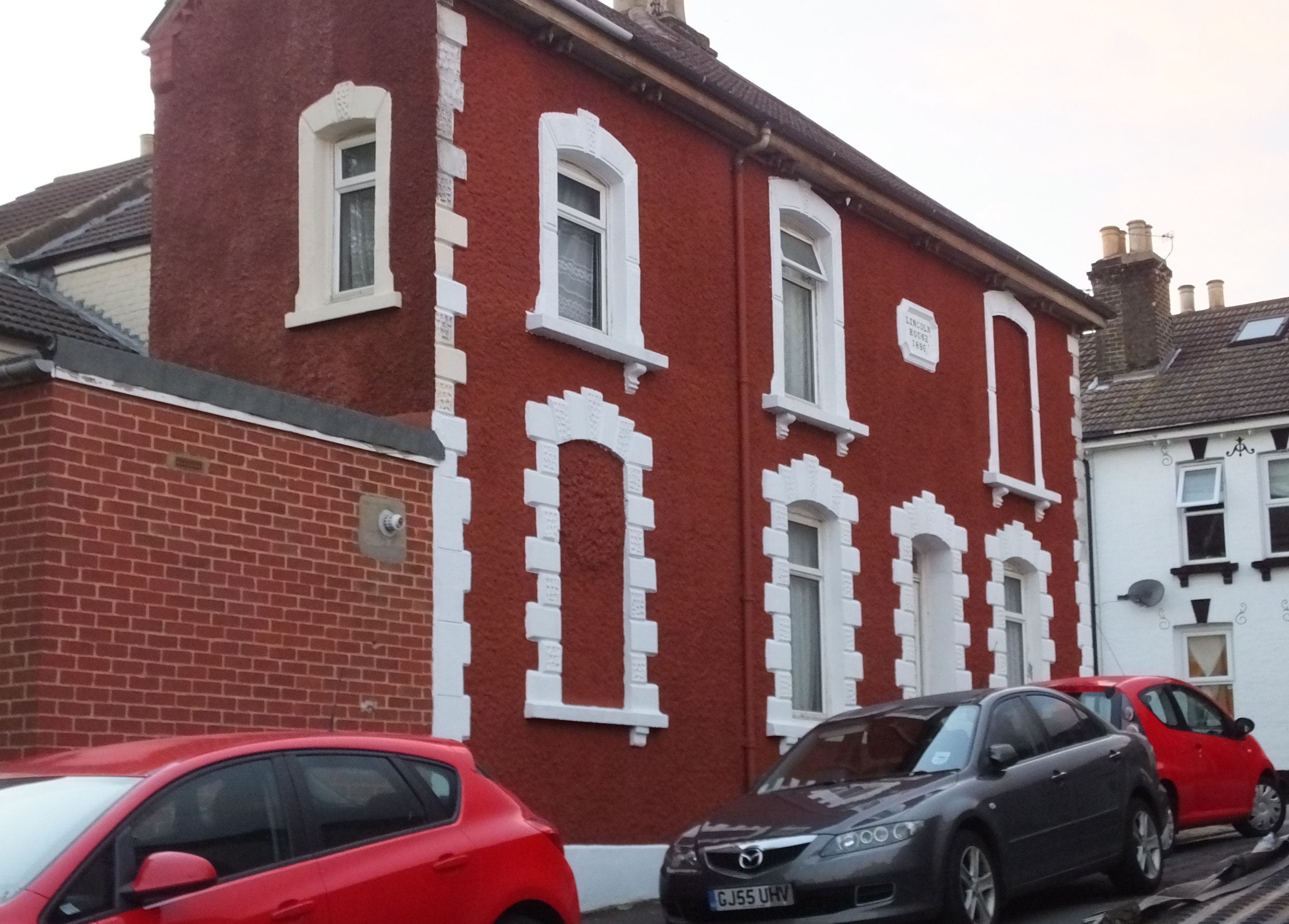
Another Strood house, 1896. Both of these have rusticated surface patterning on the shorter blocks.
