= Torrebelvicino =

- Comune
- Comune di Torrebelvicino
- Location within Italy Location within Veneto
- Coordinates: 45°43′N 11°19′E
- Country: Italy
- Region: Veneto
- Province: Vicenza (VI)
- Frazioni: Enna, Pievebelvicino

Government
  - Mayor: Emanuele Boscoscuro

Area
  - Total: 20.74 km^{2} (8.01 sq mi)
- Elevation: 260 m (850 ft)

Population (31 December 2015)
  - Total: 5,917
  - Density: 285.3/km^{2} (738.9/sq mi)
- Demonym: Turritani
- Time zone: UTC+1 (CET)
  - Summer (DST): UTC+2 (CEST)
- Postal code: 36036
- Dialing code: 0445
- Patron saint: St. Lawrence
- Saint day: 10 August
- Website: Official website

Torrebelvicino is a town in the province of Vicenza, Veneto, Italy. SP46 goes through the town, which is included in the Val Leogra, a valley in the Vicentine Prealps.
