= Stockeld Park =

Grade I listed house in North Yorkshire, England

Coordinates: 53.9365°N 1.4348°W

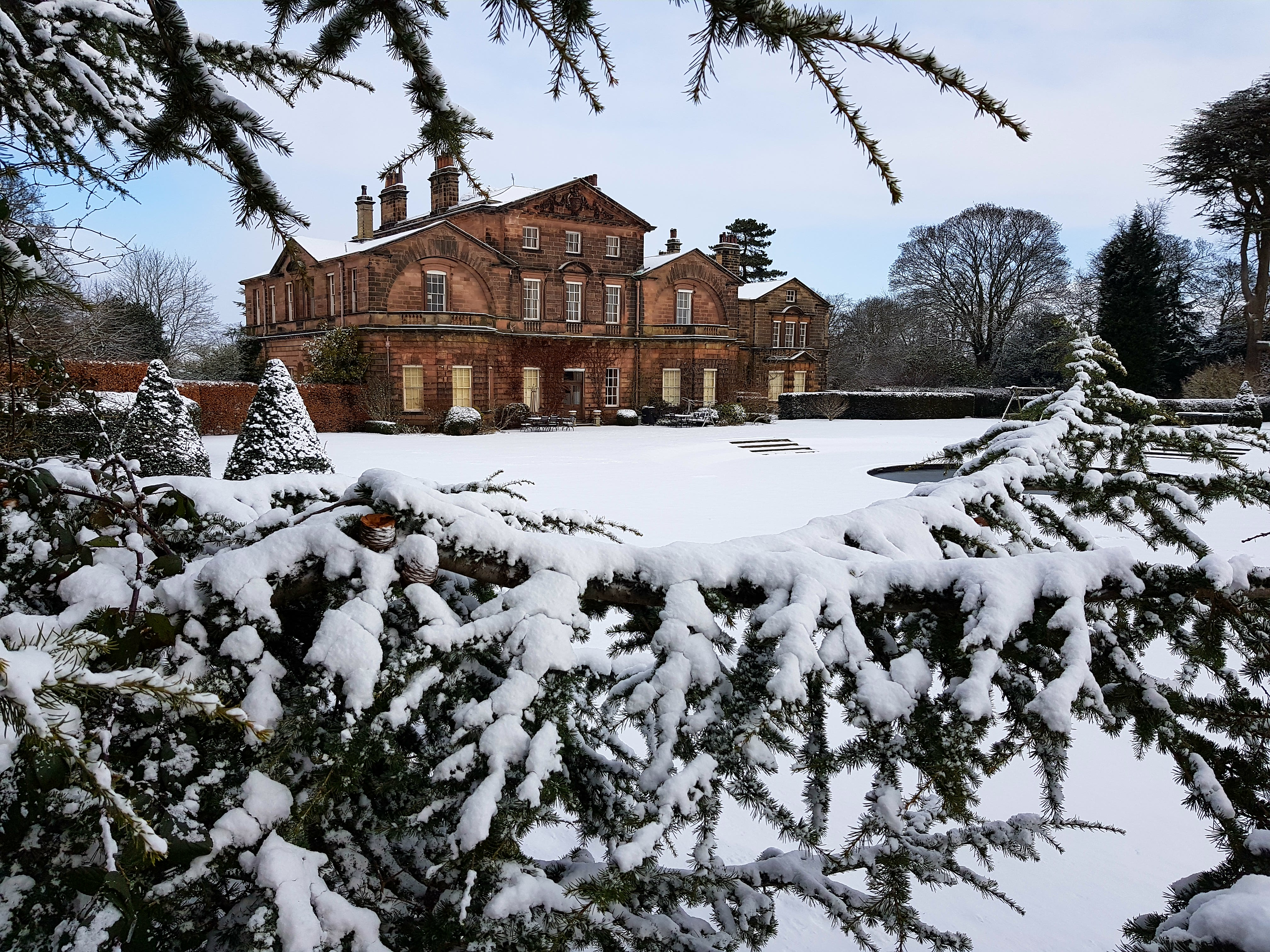
Stockeld Park

Stockeld Park is a Grade-I listed country house and estate situated between the towns of Wetherby and Harrogate, North Yorkshire, England. The estate spans some 2,000 acres and broadly covers the area between Wetherby and the villages of Spofforth and Sicklinghall.

The mansion house is constructed of stone in the style of a Palladian villa and features a cantilevered staircase, 18th and 19th century furniture and works of art. Features of the grounds include a dovecote, lodges, a ha-ha, a walled garden, chapel and stables.

In addition to traditional activities including farming and properties, Stockeld Park is home to Yorkshire's largest Christmas tree plantation, with some 500,000 Christmas trees in the ground. It is perhaps best known for its Adventure Park, a seasonal attraction created by Peter and Susie Grant, which attracts around a quarter of a million visitors each year. In 2022 Stockeld Park launched the Playhive, which was subsequently voted the best indoor play venue in the United Kingdom.

== History ==
The 2,000-acre (8.1 km^{2}) Stockeld (also earlier known as Stokeld) estate has its name from the half knight's fee of land held by Nigel de Stokeld (also Stockeld) in 1166, formerly part of the estates of William de Percy. Around 1315, the Stockeld estate passed to William de Middleton of Ilkley. In 1757, William de Middleton commissioned architect James Paine to build the present house, which was completed by 1763. William Middelton died before it was completed and the house and estate passed to his infant great-nephew, William Constable. Constable adopted the name and arms of Middelton and eventually took up residence, but his wife Clara, the mother of his 10 children, had a high-profile affair with a groom. William, after divorcing his wife, left Stockeld to live in his other property in Ilkley, leaving the house empty for some two decades. Succeeding generations of Middeltons continued to live at Ilkley, leasing out Stockeld until it was eventually sold in 1893 to Robert John Foster, owner of Black Dyke Mills in Bradford.

Foster commissioned architect Detmar Blow to make several improvements, including converting the orangery to a chapel, and was appointed High Sheriff of Yorkshire for 1898–99. During the Second World War, the house was requisitioned for use as a maternity hospital. The chapel dates from 1895 and is a grade II listed building.

Stockeld is also known to many people as Oakwell Hall from the ITV soap Emmerdale. It has been the setting for various other television and film dramas, including the 2011 ITV Wuthering Heights serial adaptation, A Touch of Frost and the 2016 film Swallows and Amazons.

== Architecture ==
=== House ===
The grade I listed house is built of millstone grit and has a Westmorland slate roof. It consists of a three-storey three-bay central block, flanked by two-storey wings, each with one wide bay. The garden front of the central block has a rusticated ground floor, a deep eaves cornice, and a triangular pediment with shields and swags. In the centre is a doorway with a fanlight and a keystone, and the windows are sashes, the window above the doorway with a cornice on consoles and a segmental pediment. The wings contain canted bay windows with balustrades. The rear front has quoins and a central portico with four pairs of Tuscan columns. The ground floor windows in the wings have Gibbs surrounds and triangular pediments.

=== Pigeon house ===
The pigeon house is contemporary with the main building, and is grade II* listed. It is built of− gritstone, with chamfered quoins, a string course, a moulded eaves cornice, and a stone slate roof on which is a wooden lantern with a lead roof and finial. It has two storeys and an octagonal plan. The doorway on the north side has a Gibbs surround, a double keystone and a triangular pediment. On the east and west walls are alcoves, over which are oculi with keystones, and on the south side is a blocked doorway with a louvred opening above. The interior is brick-lined and contains nesting holes.

=== Chapel ===
The chapel is built of stone with a Westmorland slate roof. It has a single storey, and fronts of one and five bays, with transepts added later. The entrance has Ionic columns and pilasters on a chamfered rusticated plinth, and a dated frieze. The doorway has a moulded architrave and a cornice on consoles. Above it is an oculus with keystones, and a pediment with a relief carving. On the chapel is a clock turret with clasping pilasters, open segmental pediments and a dome with a finial.

== See also ==
- Grade I listed buildings in North Yorkshire (district)
- Listed buildings in Spofforth with Stockeld
- The Christmas Adventure
