= Quinto Vicentino =

- Comune
- Comune di Quinto Vicentino
- Coat of arms

- Location within Italy Location within Veneto
- Coordinates: 45°34′N 11°37′E
- Country: Italy
- Region: Veneto
- Province: Vicenza (VI)
- Frazioni: Lanzè, Valproto, Villaggio Monte Grappa

Government
  - Mayor: Renzo Segato

Area
  - Total: 17 km^{2} (6.6 sq mi)

Population (February 28, 2007)
  - Total: 5,383
  - Density: 320/km^{2} (820/sq mi)
- Time zone: UTC+1 (CET)
  - Summer (DST): UTC+2 (CEST)
- Postal code: 36050
- Dialing code: 0444
- Website: Official website

Quinto Vicentino is a town and comune in the province of Vicenza, Veneto, Italy. It is east of A31.

The town is the birthplace of Urbano Lazzaro, the Italian partisan who identified and arrested Benito Mussolini in 1945. Its main attraction is Villa Thiene

== Sources ==
- (Google Maps)
