= Sicklinghall =

Village and civil parish in North Yorkshire, England

Coordinates: 53°55′51″N 1°27′01″W

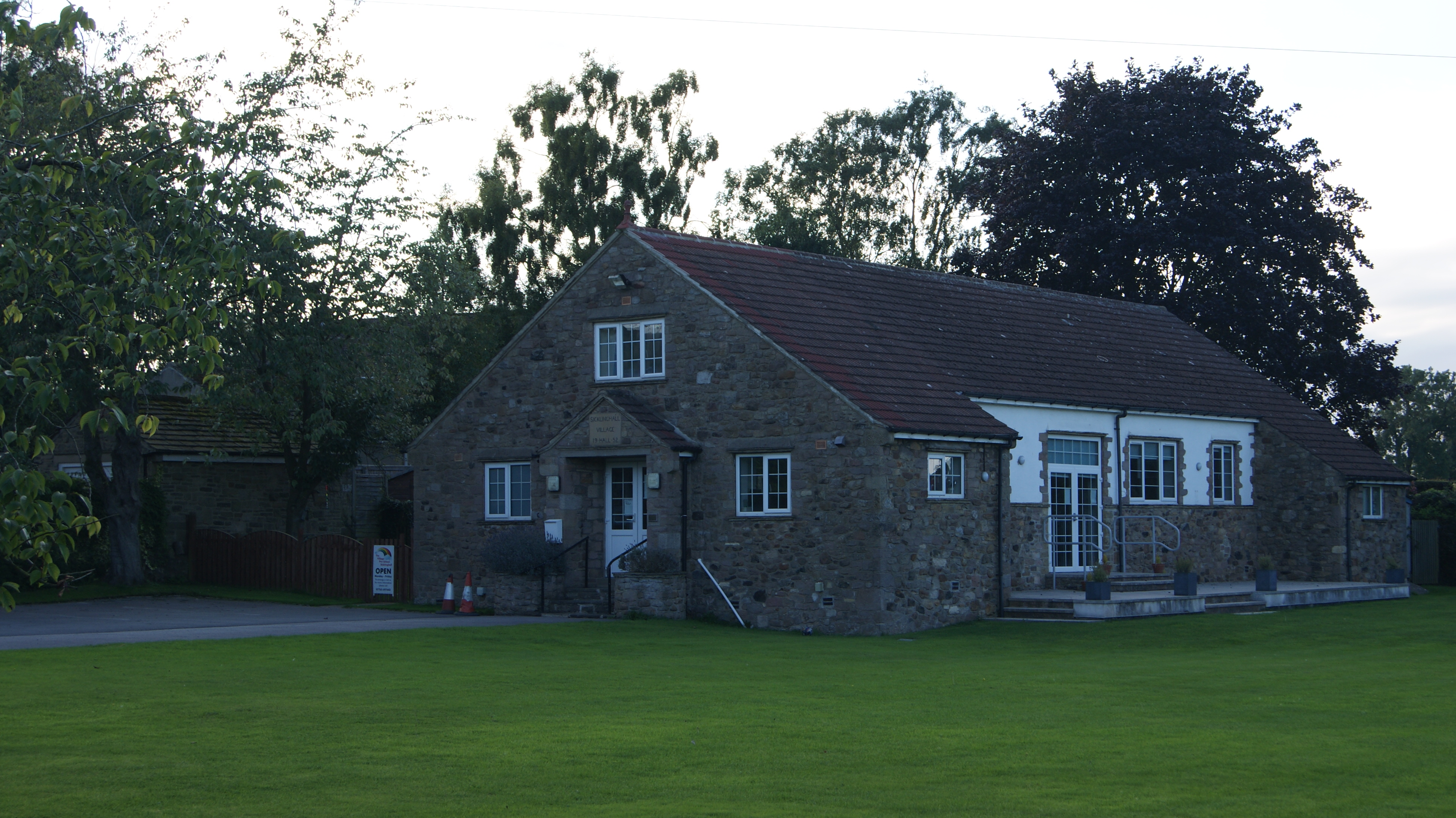
- Sicklinghall village hall

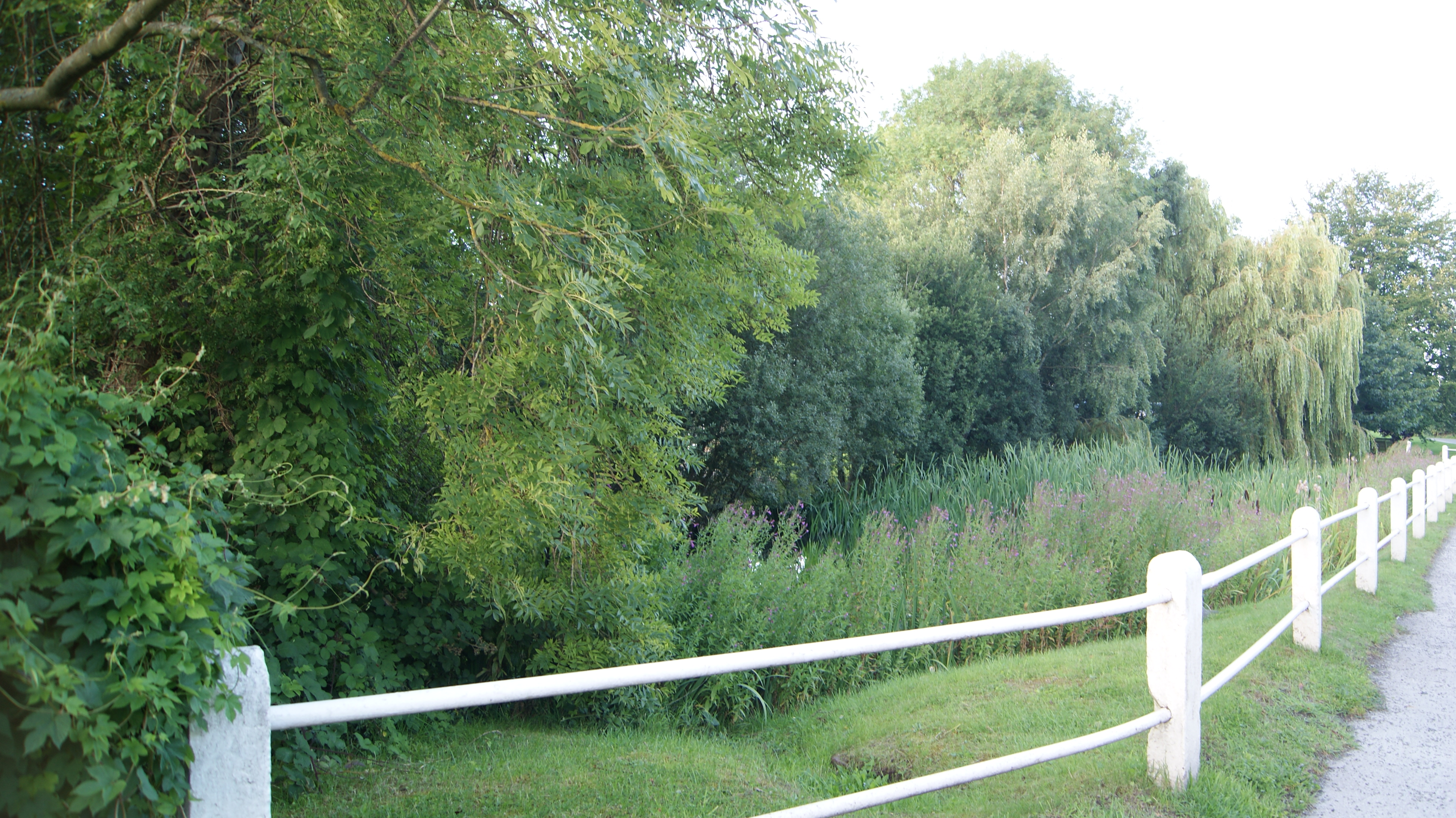
- Pond to the east of Sicklinghall; there is another one to the west.

- Location within North Yorkshire
- Population: 336 (2011 census)
- OS grid reference: SE363484
- Civil parish: Sicklinghall
- Unitary authority: North Yorkshire
- Ceremonial county: North Yorkshire
- Region: Yorkshire and the Humber
- Country: England
- Sovereign state: United Kingdom
- Post town: WETHERBY
- Postcode district: LS22
- Dialling code: 01937
- Police: North Yorkshire
- Fire: North Yorkshire
- Ambulance: Yorkshire
- UK Parliament: Selby with Ainsty

Sicklinghall is a village and civil parish in North Yorkshire, England that is situated between the town of Wetherby (3 miles (5 km) to the east) and the village of Kirkby Overblow.

In 2007 the population was recorded as 300, increasing to 336 at the 2011 Census.

The village is surrounded by granges; on the eastern side lie Skerry Grange and Sicklinghall Grange and on the western Addlethorpe Grange. Sicklinghall Grange is set in a 107-acre (0.43 km^{2}) estate, it is the UK residence of racehorse owner, Sir Robert Ogden. However the 'big house' is Stockeld Park, a Grade I-listed palladian villa that sits at the heart of a 2,000-acre estate and is home to the Grant family.

Until 1974 it was part of the West Riding of Yorkshire. From 1974 to 2023 it was part of the Borough of Harrogate, it is now administered by the unitary North Yorkshire Council.

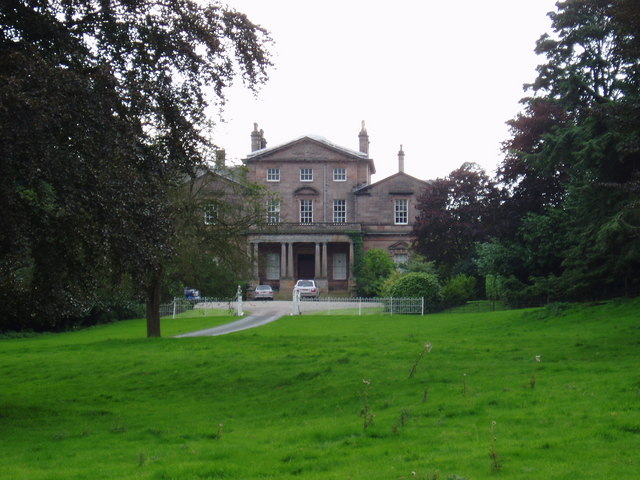
Stockeld Park, a Palladian villa north-east of Sicklinghall

== History ==
The name Sicklinghall derives from the Old English Sicelingashalh or Sicelinghalh, meaning 'nook of land of Sicel's people' or 'nook of land at Sicel's place'.

The village is referred to in the Domesday Book as "Sidingale", in the hundred of Burghshire in the West Riding, and the lord and tenant in chief is noted as the King. In Kirkby's Inquest (1284-5) the village is referred to as Siclinghalle; in the Knights' Fees of 1302 it is Sykelynghall, and in the Nomina Villarum (1316) it is written Sigglinghall.

There has been a school in the village of Sicklinghall since at least 1850 when Mrs Fenton Scott of Woodhall built a single storey school house.

There is a Roman Catholic convent situated by the Church of the Immaculate Conception and monastery dating from 1852 to the south of the village.

== Public buildings and amenities ==
The village has two churches; St Peter's (Church of England), and the Church of the Immaculate Conception (Roman Catholic). There is a pub called The Scott's Arms, a primary school and a village hall. There are ponds at either end of the village.

Sicklinghall has a range of equestrian-related centres in and around the village's centre, with the Sicklinghall Park livery located in the village centre, and Hill Croft Farm Riding Stables located about 0.6 miles (1 km) west of the village on the road towards Kirkby Overblow.

== Sports teams ==
Sicklinghall has a cricket team playing in the local Wetherby Cricket League. The ground is situated at the top of the village, the club having moved from nearby Stockeld Park in 2002. In 2016 an arson attack on the cricket club destroyed the pavilion.

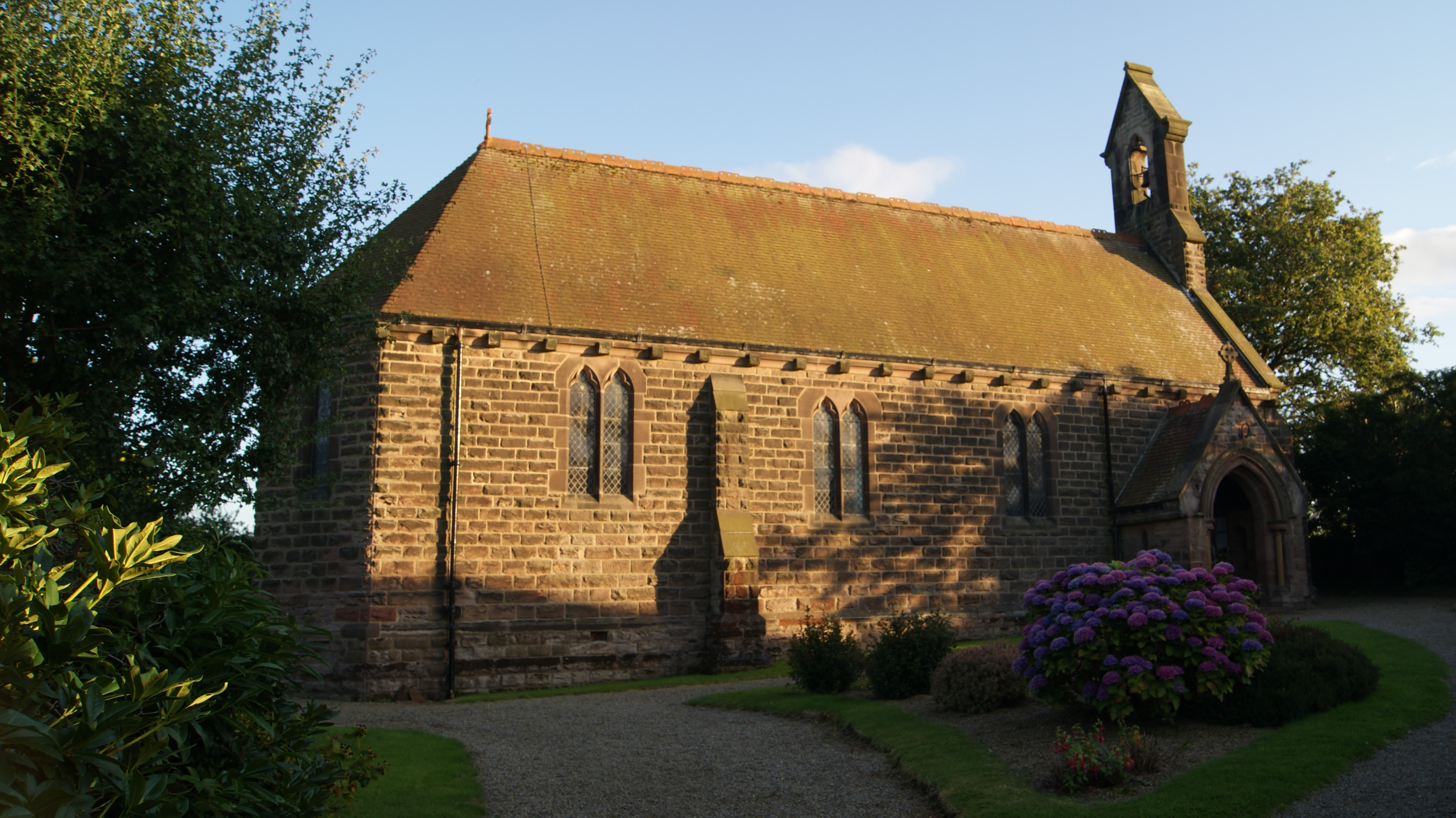
St. Peter's Church

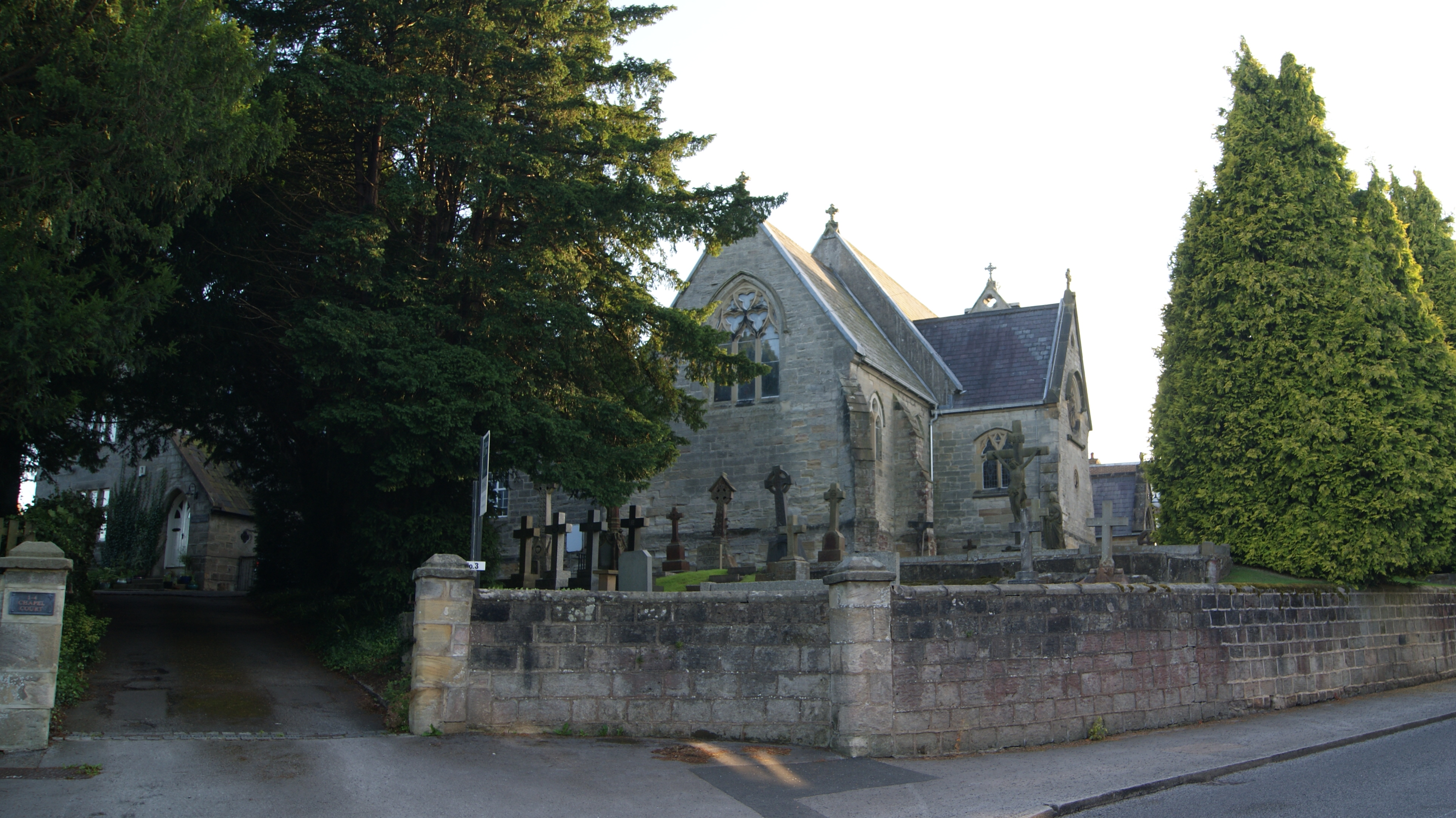
Church of the Immaculate Conception

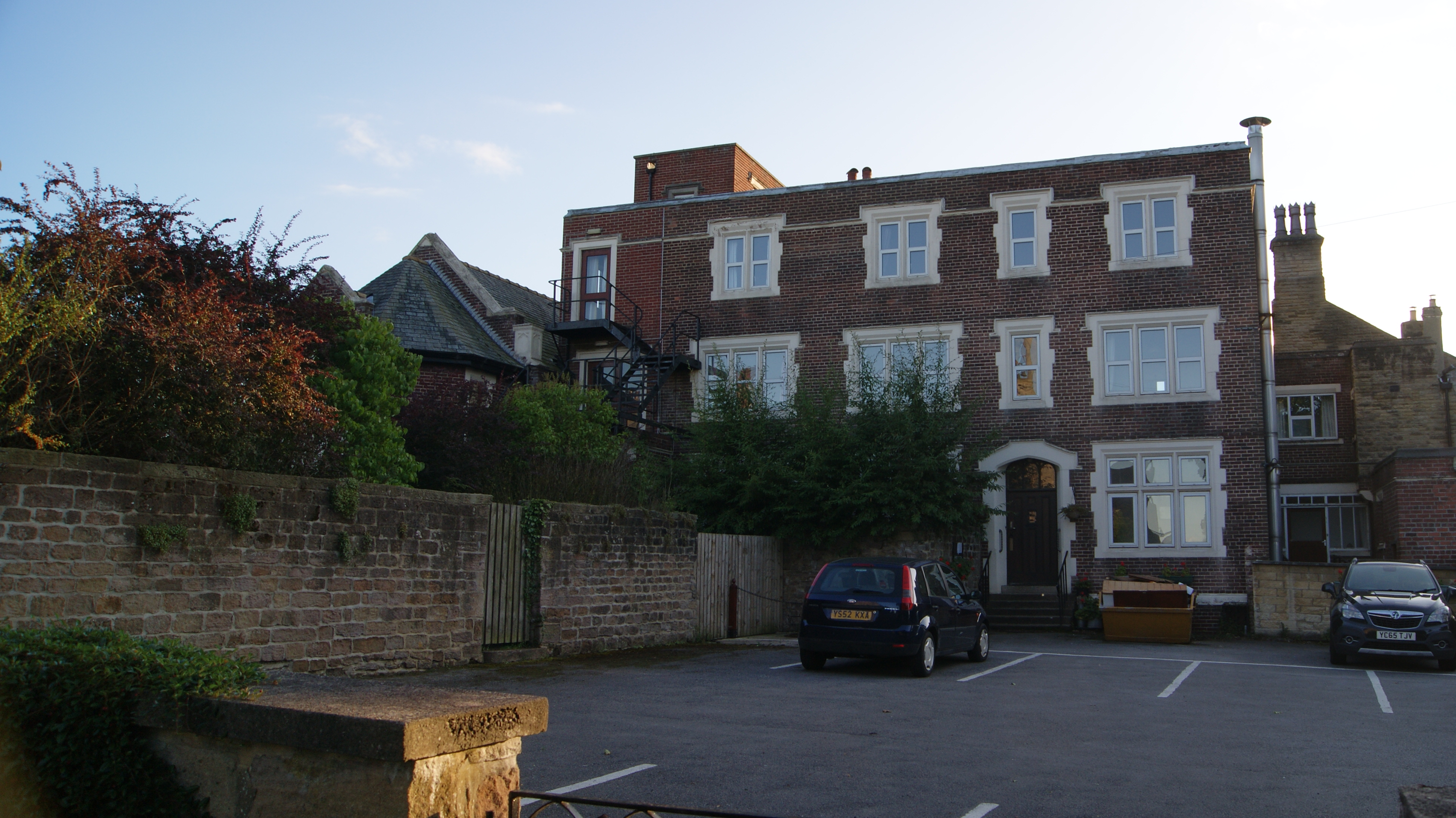
Convent of the Immaculate Conception

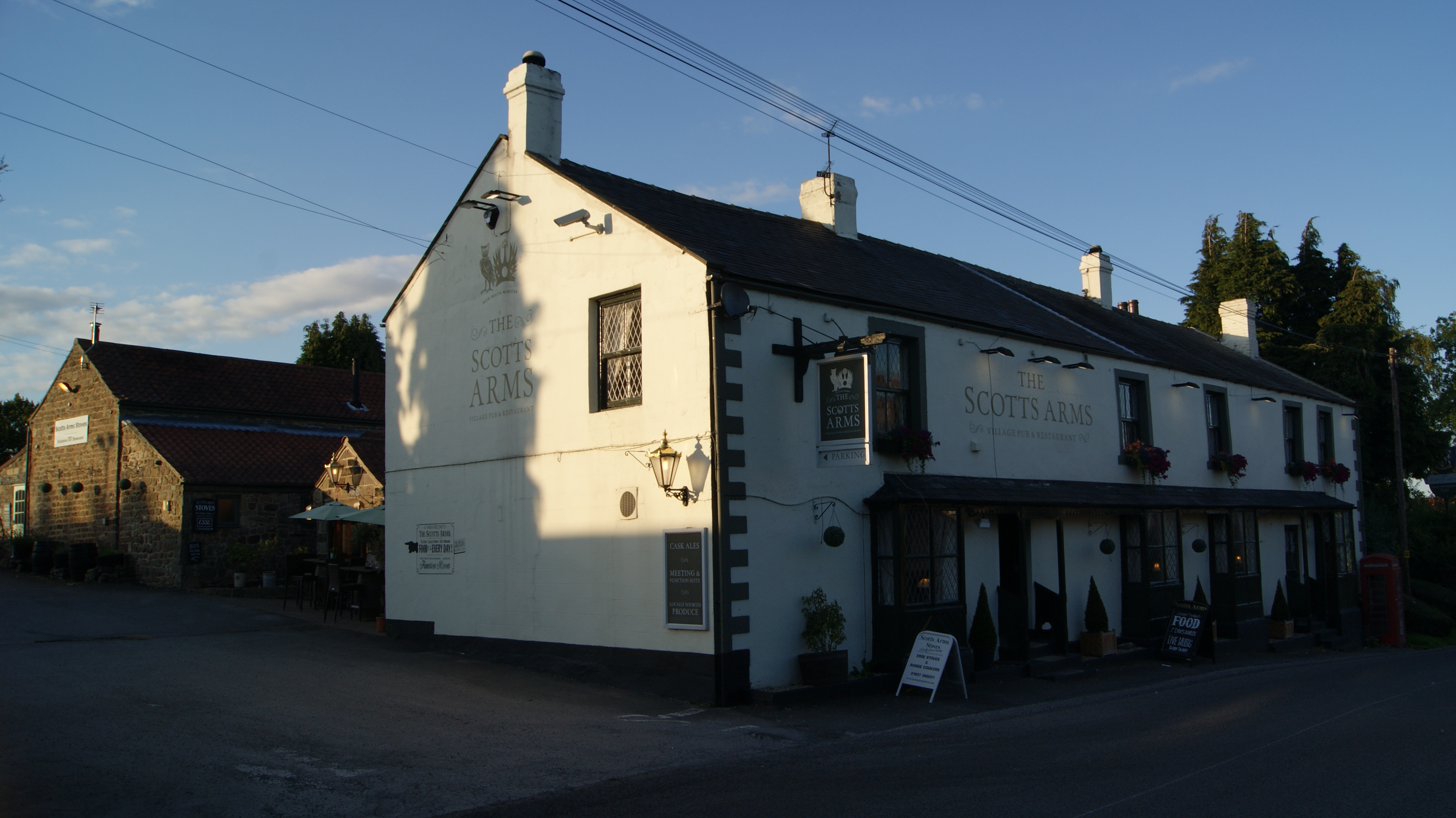
Scotts Arms

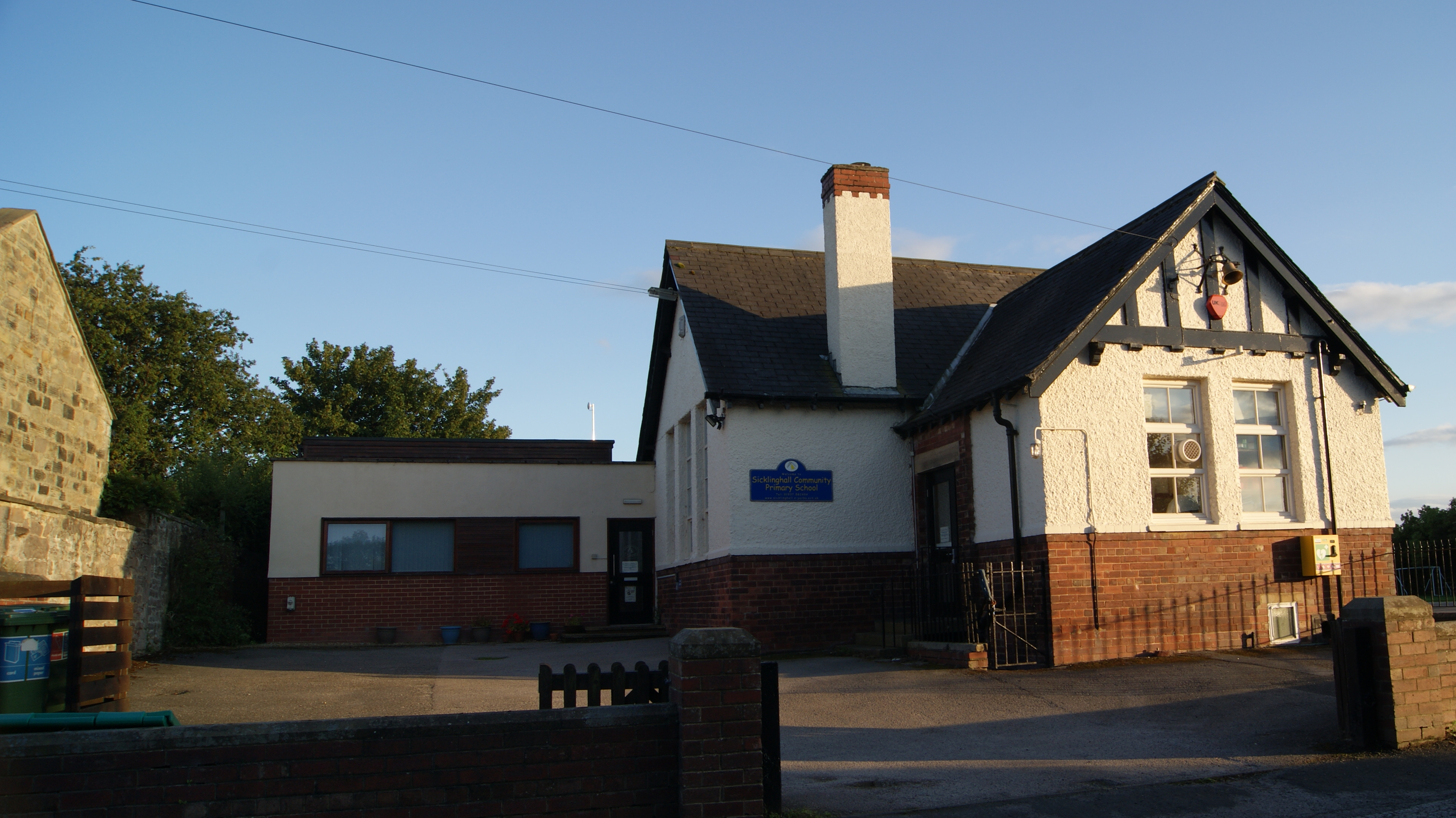
Sicklinghall Community Primary School

== Notable people ==
Former Leeds United and Aston Villa manager David O'Leary is a resident of Sicklinghall.

== See also ==
- Listed buildings in Sicklinghall
