= Old Rectory, Spofforth =

Clergy house in Spofforth, North Yorkshire, England

Coordinates: 53.9545°N 1.4471°W

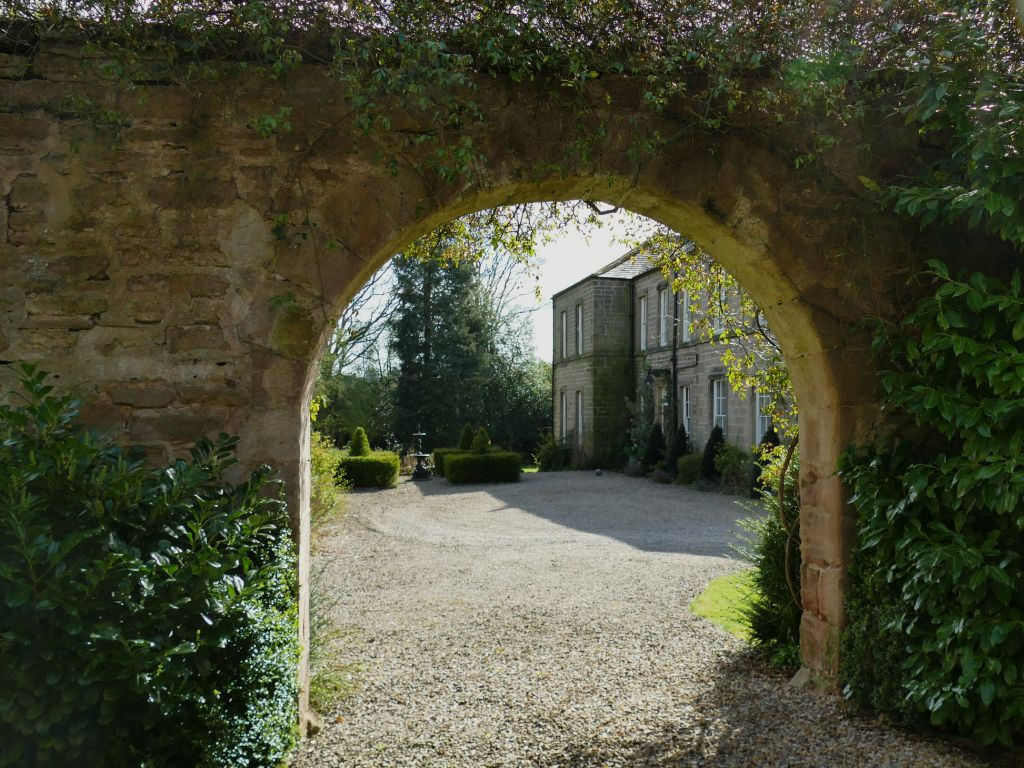
The building, in 2021

The Old Rectory is a historic building in Spofforth, North Yorkshire, a village in England.

The oldest parts of the house are believed to be 14th century, and to have originally formed part of the Hospital of Mary Magdalene. It was later converted into a private house, and in the 18th century was largely rebuilt as the rectory of All Saints' Church. The building was grade II listed in 1952. When it was sold in 1998, it was listed as having six bedrooms, three bathrooms, three reception rooms, a kitchen, cloakroom, and 2 acres (0.81 ha) of grounds.

The house is built of sandstone with a stone slate roof. There are two storeys and seven bays, the left two bays in a slightly projecting wing. The doorway has a moulded surround, a fanlight and a pulvinated entablature, and the windows are sashes. At the rear is a blocked 14th-century window. Inside, there is an 18th-century staircase.

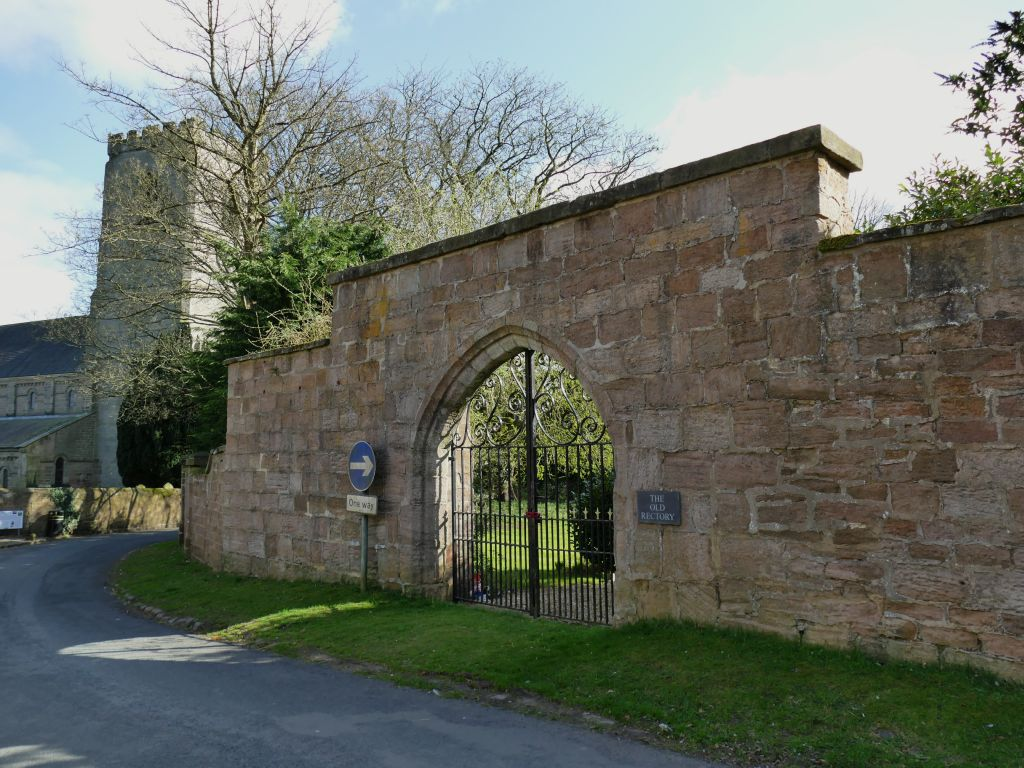
Gateway to the Old Rectory

At the entrance to the grounds of the house are two archways in sandstone. The archway in the boundary wall has a four-centred arch of voussoirs, and a pair of wrought iron gates. The wall is coped with flagstones, and steps up over the arch. The inner archway was moved to its present site, probably, in 1928. It is free-standing and without gates, and also four-centred with voussoirs. The wall and archway were also grade II listed in 1952.

== See also ==
- Listed buildings in Spofforth with Stockeld
