= Listed buildings in Kirk Deighton =

Kirk Deighton is a civil parish in the county of North Yorkshire, England. It contains seven listed buildings that are recorded in the National Heritage List for England. Of these, one is listed at Grade I, the highest of the three grades, and the others are at Grade II, the lowest grade. The parish contains the village of Kirk Deighton, the hamlet of Ingmanthorpe and the surrounding area. The listed buildings consist of a church, a sundial in the churchyard, gate piers nearby, houses and associated structures, and a milepost.

== Key ==
Grade	Criteria
I	Buildings of exceptional interest, sometimes considered to be internationally important
II	Buildings of national importance and special interest

== Buildings ==
Name and location	Photograph	Date	Notes	Grade
All Saints' Church; 53.94935°N 1.39386°W		Early to mid 15th century	The church, which incorporates earlier material, has been altered and extended through the centuries, including restorations in 1849 and 1874. It is built in limestone with roofs of lead and stone slate, and consists of a nave with a clerestory, north and south aisles, a south porch, a chancel, and a west steeple. The steeple has a tower with three stages, diagonal buttresses, string courses, a south staircase projections, paired mullioned and transomed bell openings with hood moulds, an embattled parapet with gargoyles and corner pinnacles, and a recessed octagonal spire with a weathervane. On the west side of the tower is a doorway, above which is a Perpendicular window, both with hood moulds. The body of the church also has embattled parapets.	I
Gate piers south of All Saints' Church; 53.94874°N 1.39387°W	—	Mid 18th century	The gate piers are in a boundary wall to the south of the entrance to the churchyard. They are in stone, rusticated and about 2 metres (6 ft 7 in) high. Each pier has an entablature and a lightly moulded pyramidal cap.	II
Gates and gate piers, Ingmanthorpe Hall; 53.94508°N 1.35589°W	—	Mid 18th century	The two pairs of gate piers are in stone. The inner piers are about 3 metres (9.8 ft) high on a high plinth, they are rusticated, and have a pilaster strip on the sides. Each pier has an elaborately moulded cornice, an entablature, and a moulded stem for a missing ball finial. The outer piers are about 2.5 metres (8 ft 2 in) high, and are without the stems. The gates are in wrought iron, and are elaborately decorated.	II
Sundial; 53.94920°N 1.39379°W	—	c. 1772	The sundial is in the churchyard of All Saints' Church, to the south of the church. It has a gritstone base of two steps, the lower step about 1 metre (3 ft 3 in) square. On it is a limestone shaft, consisting of a baluster on a plinth, with a reeded lower part, and a frieze with stylised acanthus decoration and roll mouldings. On the top is an octagonal bronze gnomon and an inscribed dial.	II
Kirk Deighton Hall; 53.94925°N 1.39308°W		Late 18th century	A rectory, later a private house, in limestone and gritstone, on a plinth, with rusticated quoins, a shallow blocking course with moulded coping, a projecting band at eaves level, and a hipped purple slate roof. There are three storeys, five bays, a single-storey wing to the right, and a rear wing. On the front is a porch with Tuscan columns, an entablature and a cornice. The windows are sashes with architraves. The windows of the rear wing have keystones.	II
Ingmanthorpe Hall; 53.94510°N 1.35646°W		Early 19th century	A country house later used for other purposes, it is in stone with sill bands, a moulded cornice below the attic, a deep cornice and blocking course above it, and a grey slate roof. There are two storeys and an attic, a main block with fronts of five bays, and to the left is a later single-storey ballroom and billiard room with fronts of four and five bays. The middle three bays of the main block project slightly, and the centre bay is bowed. On the front is a porte-cochère with three round arches and keystones. The windows throughout are sashes with various surrounds. The ballroom has pilasters, French doors, a cornice, parapets and a hipped roof.	II
Milepost; 53.93627°N 1.41090°W		19th century	The milepost is on the northeast side of the A661 road. It is in cast iron on gritstone, about 80 centimetres (31 in) high, and has a triangular plan and a rounded top. On the rounded top is inscribed "Wetherby Spofforth & Knaresboro Road* and "Kirk Deighton", on the left face is the distance to Wetherby, and on the right face the distances to Harrogate Knaresborough and Spofforth.	II
