= Shackley =

Shackley is a surname. Notable people with the surname include:

- Anna Shackley (born 2001), Scottish road and track cyclist
- John Shackley (born 1965), English actor, known for The Tripods (TV series)
- Myra Shackley (born 1949), Professor at Nottingham Business School and ordained priest in the Church of England
- Theodore Shackley (1927–2002), CIA Officer
