= Listed buildings in Spofforth with Stockeld =

Spofforth with Stockeld is a civil parish in the county of North Yorkshire, England. It contains 27 listed buildings that are recorded in the National Heritage List for England. Of these, one is listed at Grade I, the highest of the three grades, three are at Grade II*, the middle grade, and the others are at Grade II, the lowest grade. The parish contains the village of Spofforth and the surrounding countryside. The most important building in the parish is Stockeld Park, which is listed, together with associated structures in the gardens and grounds. The other listed buildings include the ruins of Spofforth Castle, a church and a memorial in the churchyard, houses, cottages and associated structures, a mounting block, a bridge, farmhouses, and two mileposts.

== Key ==
Grade	Criteria
I	Buildings of exceptional interest, sometimes considered to be internationally important
II*	Particularly important buildings of more than special interest
II	Buildings of national importance and special interest

== Buildings ==
Name and location	Photograph	Date	Notes	Grade
Spofforth Castle; 53.95489°N 1.45250°W		13th century	A fortified house, now in ruins. It is in sandstone, and has two storeys on the north side, and one on the south, where it is built against a rock outcrop. It has a chamfered plinth, a continuous hood mould, buttresses, and windows, some with trefoil heads. At the northwest corner is a stair turret with a pointed stone roof and a finial.	II*
Archways, gates and walls, The Old Rectory; 53.95474°N 1.44677°W		Medieval	At the entrance to the grounds of the house are two archways in sandstone. The archway in the boundary wall has a four-centred arch of voussoirs, and a pair of wrought iron gates. The wall is coped with flagstones, and steps up over the arch. The inner archway was moved to its present site, probably, in 1928. It is free-standing and without gates, and also four-centred with voussoirs.	II
All Saints' Church; 53.95450°N 1.44585°W		15th century	The oldest part of the church is the tower, the interior of the church contains some late 12th-century remains, and otherwise it was rebuilt in 1854–55. It is built in gritstone with Westmorland slate roofs, and consists of a nave with a clerestory, north and south aisles, a south porch, a chancel, and a west tower. The tower has four stages, diagonal buttresses, Perpendicular windows, a clock face, two-light bell openings, and an embattled parapet. The windows on the body of the church have round-arched heads, and the east window has three lancetss.	II*
47, 49, 51 and 53 Castle Street; 53.95614°N 1.45181°W		Late 17th century	A terrace of four houses in gritstone, with a pantile roof, stone copings and shaped kneelers. There are two storeys and each house has a doorway. The second doorway from the left has a chamfered surround and a large dated and initialled ogee lintel, and above it is a hood mould that continues over the window to the left. Most of the windows are sashes.	II
Manor House; 53.95561°N 1.45104°W	—	Late 17th century	The house is in gritstone, with quoins, a floor band, paired stone gutter brackets, and a pantile roof with eaves courses of stone slate, stone coping and shaped kneelers. There are two storeys and five bays. The central doorway has a moulded architrave and a rectangular fanlight, and the windows are cross windows.	II
Brookroyd Cottage; 53.954864°N 1.44959°W		Mid-18th century	The house is in gritstone, with quoins, and a Westmorland slate roof with stone coping and shaped kneelers. There are two storeys and two bays. In the centre is a gable porch, on the ground floor are bow windows, the upper floor contains sash windows, and all the openings have architraves.	II
Chantry House and Massey Garth; 53.95372°N 1.44536°W		18th century	Two houses incorporating material from the 13th century, they are in gritstone, with roofs of Westmorland slate and pantile. There are two storeys and three parallel ranges, the middle range with 13th-century material. Massey Garth at the front has three bays, a porch, and sash windows. Chantry House at the rear has a central round-arched doorway with hollow mouldings and columns, and sash windows, some horizontally sliding.	II
Mounting block 53.95478°N 1.44662°W		18th century probable)	The mounting block is in sandstone, and consists of two steps with a possible lower step under the ground.	II
Packhorse Bridge; 53.95900°N 1.44947°W		18th century	The bridge is in millstone grit, and consists of a single span, about 4 metres (13 ft) long and 1 metre (3 ft 3 in) wide. It has a keystone, a projecting band, and arched parapets of large blocks.	II
Stockeld Park; 53.93645°N 1.43486°W		1758–63	A country house designed by James Paine in Palladian style. It is in millstone grit and has a Westmorland slate roof. The house consists of a three-storey three-bay central block, flanked by two-storey wings, each with one wide bay. The garden front of the central block has a rusticated ground floor, a deep eaves cornice, and a triangular pediment with shields and swags. In the centre is a doorway with a fanlight and a keystone, and the windows are sashes, the window above the doorway with a cornice on consoles and a segmental pediment. The wings contain canted bay windows with balustrades. The rear front has quoins and a central portico with four pairs of Tuscan columns. The ground floor windows in the wings have Gibbs surrounds and triangular pediments.	I
Pigeon house, Stockeld Park; 53.93963°N 1.43523°W	—	1758–63	The pigeon house is in gritstone, with chamfered quoins, a string course, a moulded eaves cornice, and a stone slate roof on which is a wooden lantern with a lead roof and finial. There are two storeys and an octagonal plan. The doorway on the north side has a Gibbs surround, a double keystone and a triangular pediment. On the east and west walls are alcoves, over which are oculi with keystones, and on the south side is a blocked doorway with a louvred opening above. The interior is brick-lined and contains nesting holes.	II*
Summer house, Stockeld Park; 53.93651°N 1.43538°W	—	1758–63 (probable)	The building, later used for other purposes, is in stone with a Westmorland slate roof. There is a single storey, it has a square plan, with lower rectangular extensions to each side and an apsidal extension to the rear. In the centre is a doorway, above which is a segmental-headed window. The front and rear gables have open triangular pediments.	II
Wetherby Lodge, gateway and wall 53.93508°N 1.40850°W		1758–63 (probable)	The lodge and archway are in stone, with vermiculated rustication, quoins and Westmorland slate roofs. The gateway has a central arch flanked by two-storey lodges with a modillion cornice, a parapet carried across the archway, and pyramidal roofs with ball finials. To the left is an extension with a hipped roof, and to the right is a wall containing a blind circular window with keystones. The gates are in wrought iron.	II
Stockeld Lodge Farm; 53.93334°N 1.41845°W		Mid to late 18th century	The farmhouse is in gritstone, with a banded eaves cornice, and a Westmorland slate roof with stone coping and moulded kneelers. There are three storeys and three bays. The central doorway has a rusticated surround, a moulded entablature and a keystone. One ground floor window has been converted into a French window, the other windows are sashes, and the window above the doorway has a Gibbs surround. To the left is a single-storey lean-to block with a mullioned window.	II
26 and 28 High Street; 53.95343°N 1.44737°W		Late 18th century	A pair of houses in stone with a pantile roof. There are two storeys and four bays. The doorway to the left house has a shallow pointed arch. The doorway to the right house is blocked, and the entrance is by a porch on the right return. The windows are horizontally sliding sashes under shallow pointed arches.	II
Castle Farmhouse; 53.95344°N 1.44771°W		Late 18th century	Two houses combined into one, it is in gritstone, with quoins and a pantile roof. There are two storeys, five bays, and a continuous rear outshut. On the front are two doorways, there is one fixed window, and the others are horizontally sliding sashes.	II
Garden walls, archways and gates, Stockeld Park; 53.93680°N 1.43742°W	—	Late 18th century	The walls, which enclose the garden on three sides, are in red brick with stone copings, and are about 3 metres (9.8 ft) in height. They contain stone round-headed archways with quoins, and elaborate wrought iron gates.	II
The Old Rectory; 53.95453°N 1.44707°W		Late 18th century (mainly)	The house, which incorporates 14th-century material, is in sandstone with a stone slate roof. There are two storeys and seven bays, the left two bays in a slightly projecting wing. The doorway has a moulded surround, a fanlight and a pulvinated entablature, and the windows are sashes. At the rear is a blocked 14th-century window.	II
John Metcalf memorial 53.95501°N 1.44576°W	—	1810	The memorial is in the churchyard of All Saints' Church, to the northeast of the church, and commemorates John Metcalf. It is a headstone in millstone grit, about 1 metre (3 ft 3 in) in height, with a shaped top. On it is an inscription, including a poem about his life and achievements.	II
Milepost, Castle Farmhouse; 53.95352°N 1.44775°W		19th century	The milepost against the wall of the farmhouse on the west side of the A661 road is in cast iron. It has a triangular plan and a rounded top, and is about 80 centimetres (31 in)in height. The top is inscribed "Wetherby Spofforth & Knaresbro Road", and "Spofforth with Stockeld", on the left face are the distances to Harrogate and Knaresborough, and on the right face to Wetherby.	II
Milepost south of Spofforth; 53.94339°N 1.43095°W		19th century	The milepost on the northeast side of Wetherby Road (A661 road) is in cast iron on gritstone. It has a triangular plan and a rounded top, and is about 80 centimetres (31 in)in height. The top is inscribed "Wetherby Spofforth & Knaresbro Road", and "Spofforth with Stockeld", on the left face is the distance to Wetherby, and the right face are the distances to Harrogate, Knaresborough and Spofforth.	II
Spofforth Lodge, piers and railings 53.94191°N 1.42886°W	—	Late 19th century	The lodge is in stone, with rusticated quoins, a sill band, a projecting eaves cornice, a parapet, and a hipped Westmorland slate roof. There is a single storey, an L-shaped plan, and two bays. The porch has a Tuscan column, to the right is a sash window, and on the right return is a canted bay window. Flanking the entrance to the drive are iron gate piers surmounted by deers' heads. Outside these are low stone walls with iron railings containing square stone piers with banded rustication and ball finials.	II
Coach house and workshop, Stockeld Park; 53.93709°N 1.43431°W	—	Late 19th century	The building, later used for other purposes, is in stone with a Westmorland slate roof. There is a single storey and an L-shaped plan. It contains a double door, and a blocked round arch containing a sash window.	II
Stables and office, Stockeld Park; 53.93745°N 1.43431°W		Late 19th century	The building is in stone with a Westmorland slate roof. There is a single storey and three ranges. These contain pilasters, between which are round-arched windows and lunette windows.	II
The Chapel, Stockeld Park; 53.93713°N 1.43466°W	—	1895	The chapel is in stone with a Westmorland slate roof. There is a single storey, and fronts of one and five bays, with transepts added later. The entrance has Ionic columns and pilasters on a chamfered rusticated plinth, and a dated frieze. The doorway has a moulded architrave and a cornice on consoles. Above it is an oculus with keystones, and a pediment with a relief carving. On the chapel is a clock turret with clasping pilasters, open segmental pediments and a dome with a finial.	II
Aketon Close; 53.96043°N 1.45900°W	—	c. 1905	A house in stone with stone slate roofs, crowstepped gables, and an embattled parapet. There are two storeys and attics. The east front has a slightly projecting central tower, a doorway in a segmental arch with side lights, and mullioned casement windows. The south front has a recessed centre and projecting side wings, and contains a cross window and a flat-roofed dormer. On the right wing is a two-storey round bay window.	II
Stables, Aketon Close; 53.96076°N 1.45936°W	—	c. 1905	The stable building is in stone, and has a slate roof with crow-stepped gables. There are two ranges forming an L-shaped plan, with the stable yard enclosed by walls with gates. The south front has two carriage entrances, one large and the other smaller, the east front has stable doors and windows, and in the south outer gable wall is a Diocletian window. On the south range is a square ventilator with a pyramidal roof.	II
