= All Saints' Church, Kirk Deighton =

Anglican Church in North Yorkshire, England

Coordinates: 53.9493°N 1.3938°W

All Saints' Parish Church
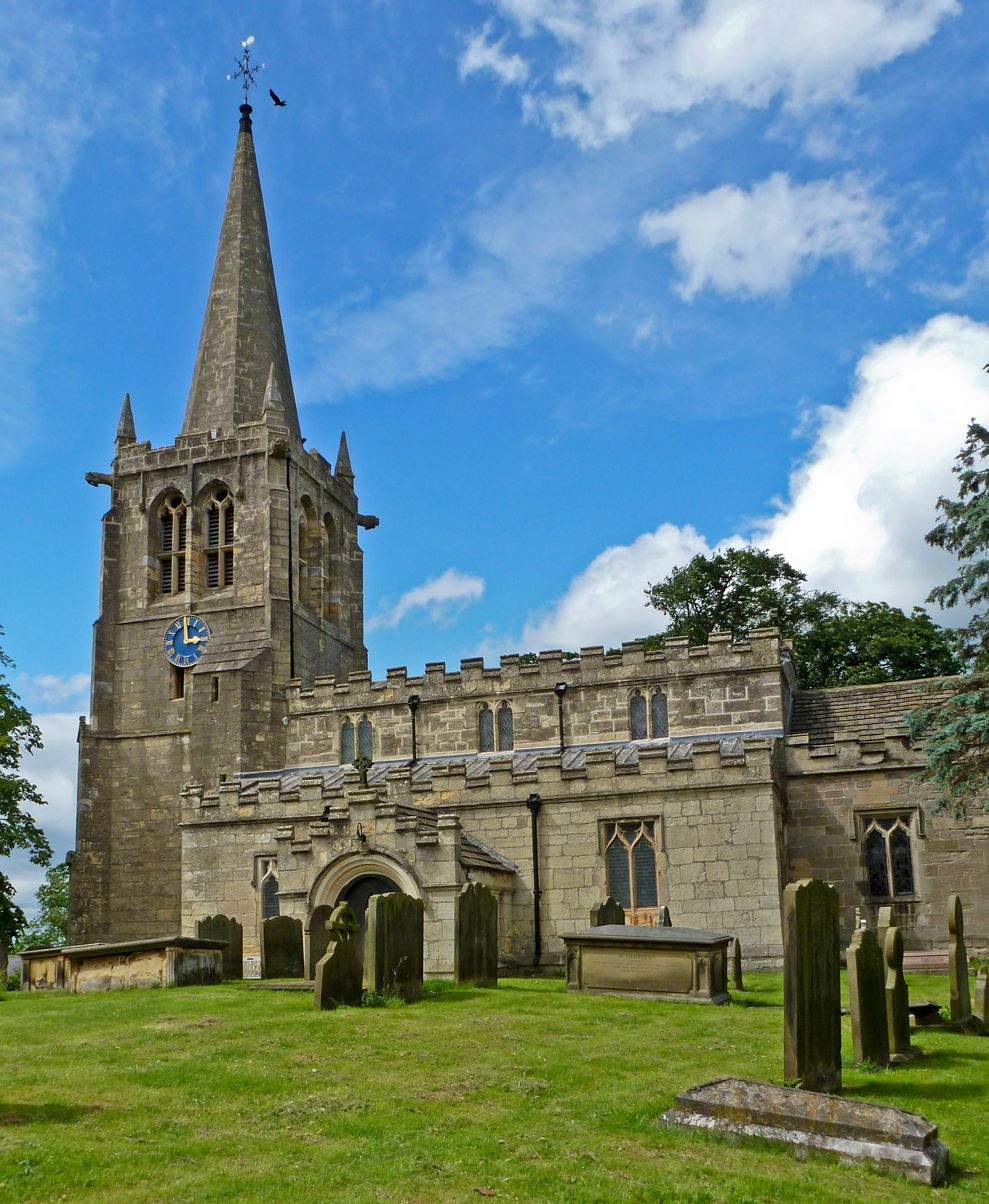
- All Saints' Church
- All Saints' Parish Church
- OS grid reference: SE 39882 50524
- Location: Kirk Deighton, North Yorkshire
- Country: England
- Denomination: Church of England

Administration
- Province: York
- Diocese: Leeds
- Parish: Spofforth and Kirk Deighton

All Saints Church is an Anglican church in the parish of Spofforth and Kirk Deighton in North Yorkshire, England. The church dates from the 11th century and is Grade I listed.

== History ==
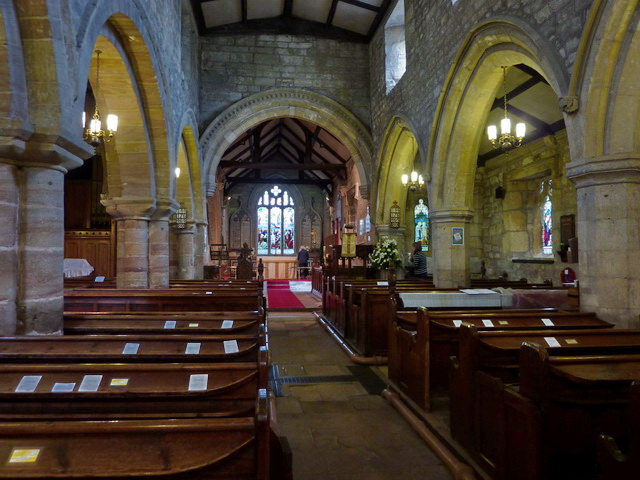
Interior of the church

A church in Dicton is mentioned in the Domesday Book of 1086. The church is, at the highest point in the village, is on the site of the original church's nave and has since been extended and rebuilt. The oldest stonework dates from between the 12th and 14th centuries and restoration was undertaken in 1849. The stained-glass is Victorian.

Patronage of the church was held by the Roos family of Ingmanthorpe until the Reformation when it passed to other families until 1794 when it was purchased by James Geldart, who the following year became Bishop of Ripon.

In 1971 the parishes of Spofforth, Kirk Deighton, Follifoot and Little Ribston were merged to form the Parish of Spofforth and Kirk Deighton in the Diocese of Ripon and Leeds.

== Buildings ==
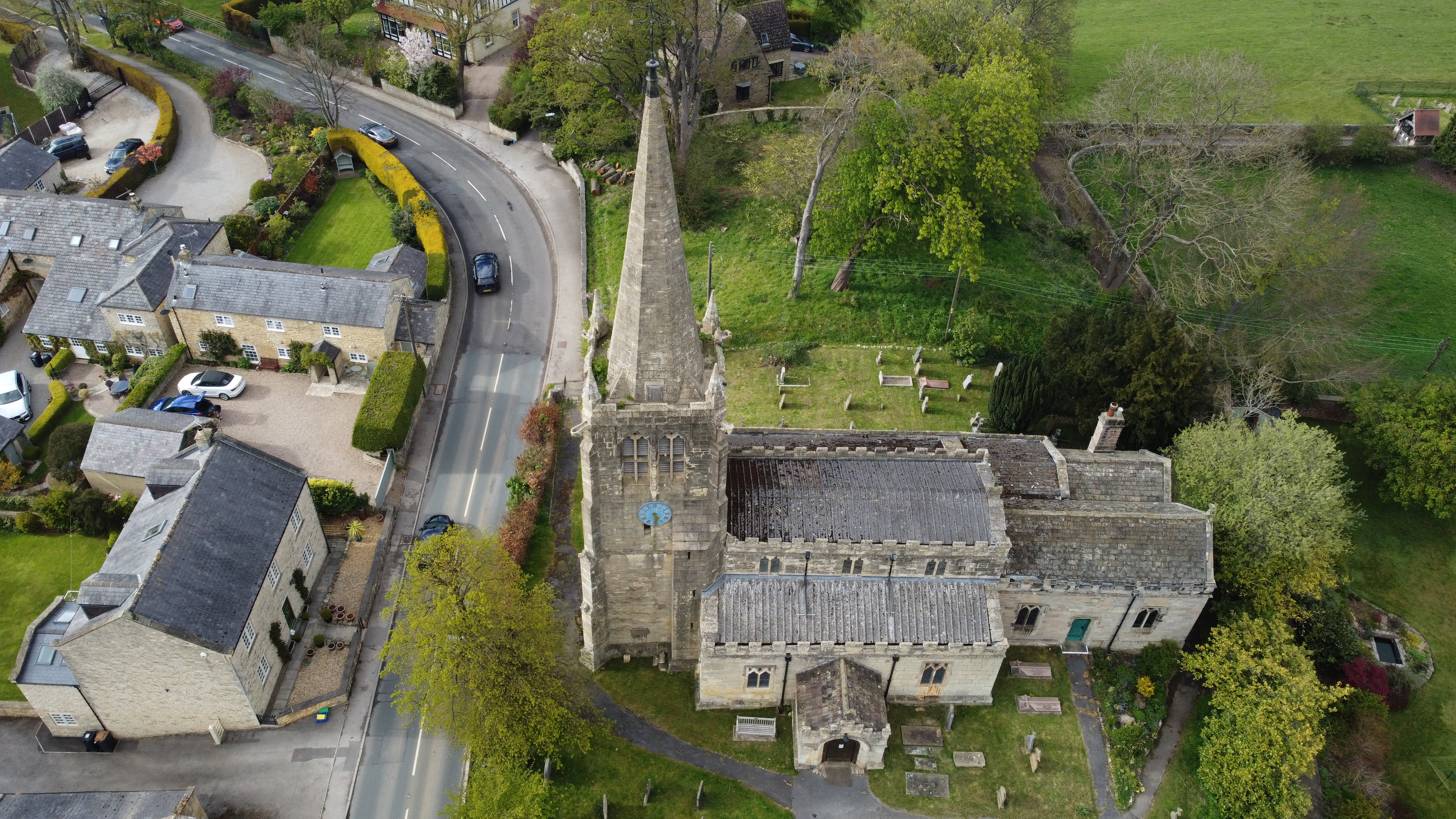
Aerial view of the church

The church has a west tower with corner pinnacles and gargoyles and has an octagonal spire 100 feet (30.5 metres) tall.

== See also ==
- Grade I listed buildings in North Yorkshire (district)
- Listed buildings in Kirk Deighton
- All Saints' Church, Spofforth, North Yorkshire
