= William Greenwood =

William Greenwood may refer to:

- Will Greenwood (born 1972), rugby player
- William Greenwood (Blessed), one of the Carthusian Martyrs, executed 1537
- William Greenwood (politician) (1875–1925), MP for Stockport
- Bill Greenwood (baseball) (1857–1902), baseball player
- William Greenwood (cricketer) (1798–1872), English cricketer
- William Osborne Greenwood (1873–1947), British surgeon and a minister of religion
