= Kirk Deighton SSSI =

Site of Special Scientific Interest in North Yorkshire, England

- Site of Special Scientific Interest
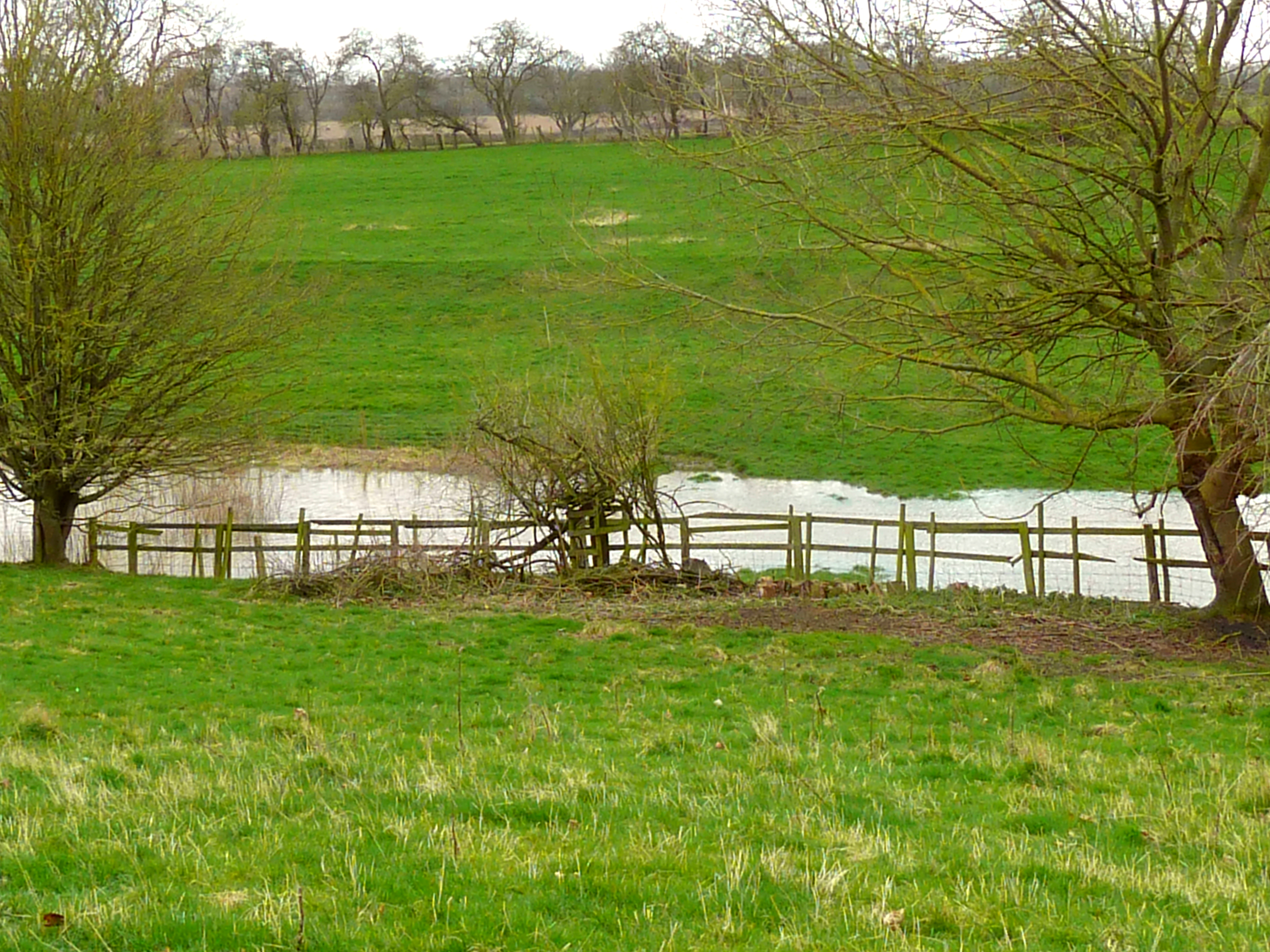
- Kirk Deighton SSSI, winter 2020

- Location within North Yorkshire
- Location of Kirk Deighton SSSI.
- Area of search: North Yorkshire
- Grid reference: SE396501
- Coordinates: 53.9455°N 1.3981°W
- Interest: Biological
- Area: 4.1081 hectares (0.04108 km^{2}; 0.01586 sq mi)
- Notification date: 16 August 2000
- Location map: Defra Magicmap

Kirk Deighton SSSI is a Site of Special Scientific Interest (SSSI) in Alton's Field, Kirk Deighton, North Yorkshire, England. This site has been recognised as having one of the largest known breeding populations of great crested newts in the United Kingdom. It is a Special Area of Conservation, and is listed for protection under a number of directives. This ordinary-looking grassland field, with a couple of ponds in it, is ideal habitat for the newts, which use the grassland for foraging, the ponds for breeding, and surrounding walls, hedges and woodpiles for hibernation. The site is not accessible to the public, and it is not permissible to survey the ponds without a licence.

== Site history ==
Cropmarks indicating Roman trackways, field systems and field boundaries in Kirk Deighton have been recorded by archaeologists. "Kirk" in the village name of Kirk Deighton refers to the parish of All Saints, which is mentioned in the Domesday Book. In the Middle Ages, the village was in the union of Barwick, in the Claro Wapentake. The village had a Royalist connection in the Civil war; the Royalist Richard Burton was rector of the church from 1648 to 1656. In 1779 there was some excitement and a parental pursuit, when the seventeen-year-old Miss Armystead eloped to Gretna Green with her own fortune and her beau Mr. Horseman, to avoid an arranged marriage with a seventy-year-old man. During the 18th century the village was in a hunting area. Richard Snowden was a gentleman and gamekeeper here in 1788.

Alton's Field was for a long time a pasture in a small village almost wholly connected with the local agriculture. Historically the underlying limestone (which probably holds the aquifer for the ponds) was quarried, and used to enrich the land.

== Site location and designation ==
Kirk Deighton SSSI is a 4.1-hectare (10-acre) biological Site of Special Scientific Interest (SSSI) and Special Area of Conservation (SAC). It is listed on the Water Framework Directive (WFD). It is listed on Biodiversity Action Plans (priority species list), Wildlife and Countryside Act 1981 (Schedule 5), and the Habitats Directive (European Communities Directive 92/43/EEC, annex II and IVa, Conservation of Natural Habitats and of Wild Fauna and Flora).

The site is on the south-west edge of the village of Kirk Deighton which lies north of Wetherby, North Yorkshire. It consists of three adjacent fields grazed by sheep, hedgerows, a stone wall, a shallow pond and a little drainage pond. The size of the shallow pond varies seasonally. The site is unmarked and inaccessible to the public. There are no public facilities. A licence is required for surveying in ponds which contain great crested newts.

The site, known as Alton's Field, was notified on 16 August 2000, because "this site supports one of the largest known breeding populations of great crested newt Triturus cristatus in the UK." The planning authorities responsible for the protection of this habitat are Harrogate Borough Council and North Yorkshire County Council.

The Joint Nature Conservation Committee describes the site as follows. Its area is composed of 3% standing and running water, 95% improved grassland and 2% woody plants. The primary reason for site selection for SAC designation is the great crested newt which breeds in a pond with wildly fluctuating levels, so that sometimes it is large, and sometimes nearly dried out. In spite of the lack of pondweed, there is nevertheless a "large population" laying eggs and recruiting more newts to the site, "demonstrating this species' ability to thrive in temporary pond sites."

== Significant site content ==
=== Fauna ===
Feeding in the pasture, and hibernating under the hedgerows, stone wall and woodpiles are great crested newt and smooth newt. Also in and around the pond is the common frog. (Note: Unless otherwise indicated, photographs of fauna on this page are for identification purposes only, and were not taken at this SSSI site.)

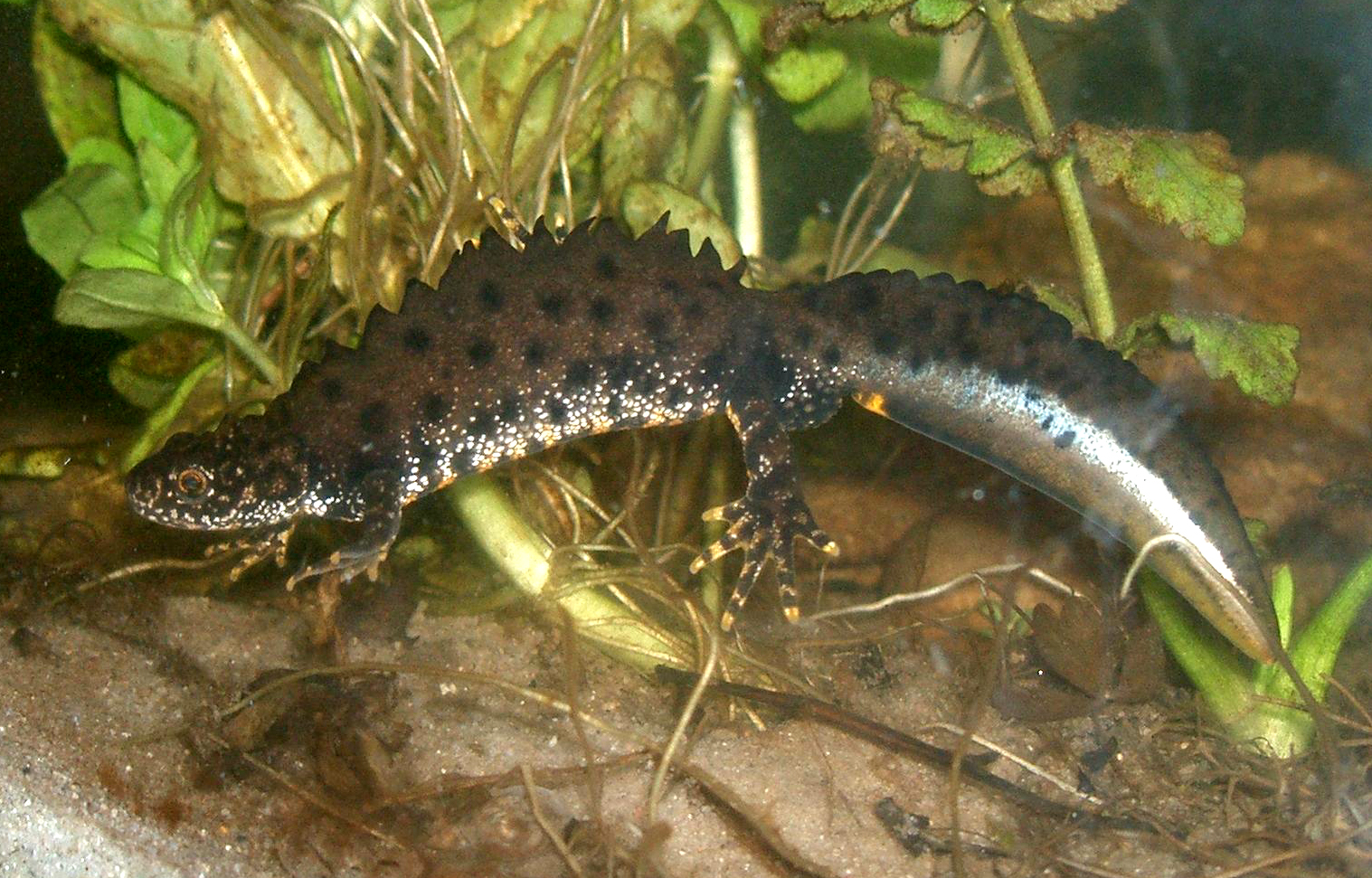
Great crested newt

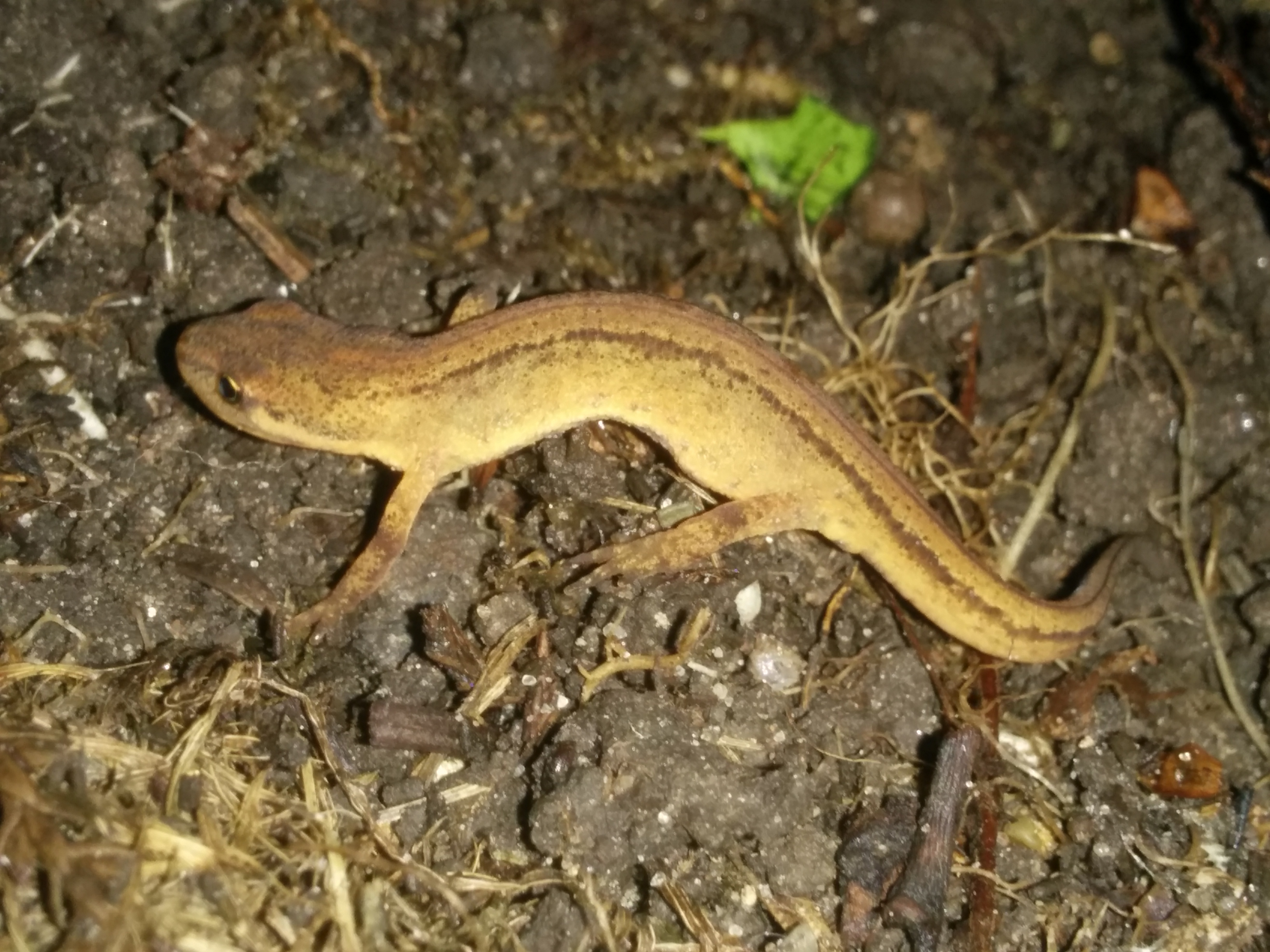
Smooth newt

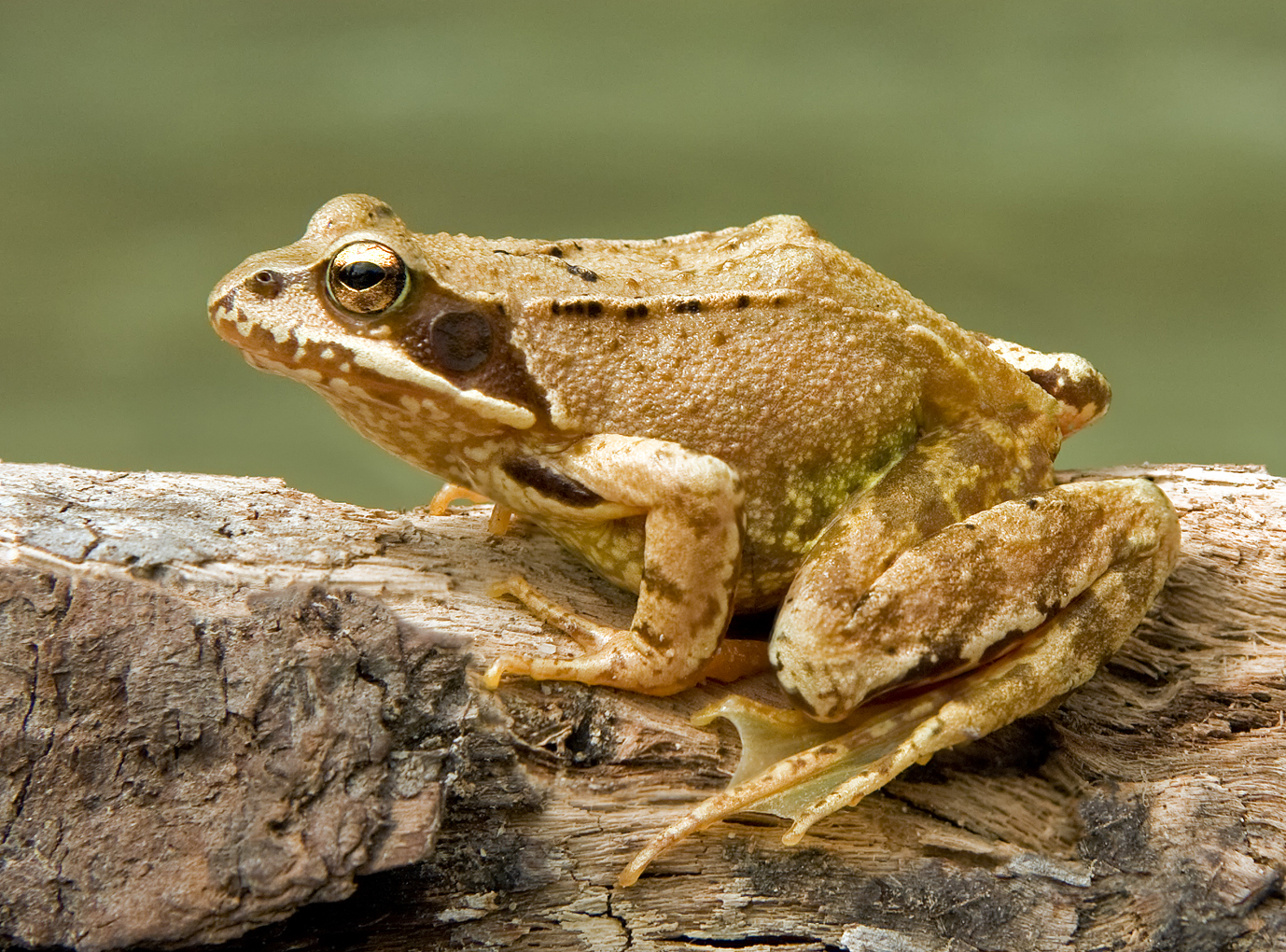
Common frog

== Maintenance ==
Because newts need to forage and hide in the grass, and breed in the water, the pond, grassland and hibernation habitats should be considered and protected together.

=== Breeding habitat ===
Any build-up of silt in the pond should be managed a little at a time, and a variety of pond depths and muddy pond verges should be maintained. Good water quality and protection from water pollution is essential. Potential pollution in this case would include increased nutrient levels due to local land management, increased presence of algae, and local groundwater abstraction. Inappropriate plant growth should be removed. The pond should remain unshaded, or at least with the trees on the northern side only. The pond should have sloping sides and shallow areas for sunlit warmth, and deeper areas for hiding in. Aquatic plants are useful for cover in the deeper sections of the pond, but if the pond dries out occasionally, that is good too because predatory fish cannot survive there.

=== Foraging, hibernation and movement habitat ===
Early winter is a favourable time for management works, while the newts are in hibernation but before the surrounding field becomes too boggy. The grassland must be maintained in suitable condition as habitat for the newts. A variety of vegetation is appropriate to the site, because the newts then have a choice of foraging and hibernating places. Newts can hibernate in tree roots, in the bases of hedges and drystone walls, under logpiles and below rubble or stone heaps. Hedgerows and ditches with vegetation provide travel corridors for newts. Because the newts on this site use neighbouring sites too, there should be no barriers to them around the borders of this site.

== Development and risk assessment ==
The situation of the great crested newt on this site was assessed in 2013 by the Amphibian and Reptile Conservation Trust, as "unfavourable and recovering" and at medium risk. The problem was that both ponds needed fencing to protect them from livestock. By walking in water and mud, the livestock had damaged the habitat and caused turbidity in the water. Fencing would permit an increase of aquatic plants to optimise conditions for the breeding of newts.

In 2018 there was a disagreement between the developers Hallam Land Management and Stockeld Park, and the local group Better Wetherby Partnership. Hallam maintained that their housing development planning application would not compromise the water levels at Kirk Deighton SSSI. Better Wetherby Partnership disputed this claim. Harrogate Borough Council's habitat regulations assessment of July 2019 bears on the matter of local planning applications. It says that the newts utilise surrounding land and are vulnerable to any future air and water pollutants. Any local planning requiring land intake and potentially affecting air and water pollutants would have a detrimental effect on the newts.

In 2009, while installing a pipeline to improve local water services to villages including Kirk Deighton, the workmen took care to protect any newts found on the pipeline's route. The Wetherby neighbourhood plan of 2020 seeks to maintain the green wildlife corridors between neighbouring villages, including Kirk Deighton.

== See also ==
Other SSSIs in this area of North Yorkshire are: Bishop Monkton Ings, Brimham Rocks, Cow Myers, Farnham Mires, Hack Fall Wood, Hay-a-Park, Mar Field Fen, Quarry Moor, and Ripon Parks.
