= Kirk Deighton =

Village and civil parish in North Yorkshire, England

Coordinates: 53.94783°N 1.39390°W

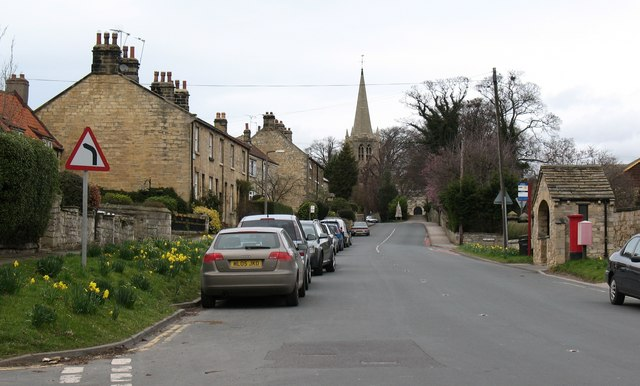
- Main street, Kirk Deighton

- Location within North Yorkshire
- Population: 484 (2011 Census)
- OS grid reference: SE398503
- Civil parish: Kirk Deighton
- Unitary authority: North Yorkshire
- Ceremonial county: North Yorkshire
- Region: Yorkshire and the Humber
- Country: England
- Sovereign state: United Kingdom
- Post town: WETHERBY
- Postcode district: LS22
- Police: North Yorkshire
- Fire: North Yorkshire
- Ambulance: Yorkshire
- UK Parliament: Wetherby and Easingwold

Kirk Deighton is a village and civil parish in the county of North Yorkshire, England. It is situated north-west of Wetherby and near the A1(M) motorway. The village was in the West Riding of Yorkshire, and Wetherby Rural District, until 1974, and is now 0.5 mile north of the border between West Yorkshire and North Yorkshire.

The civil parish extends east of the A1(M) and north to the River Nidd. It includes the hamlet of Ingmanthorpe, and Wetherby Services on the motorway. The civil parish had a population of 484 in the 2011 Census.

== History ==
Kirk Deighton and its church (All Saints' Church) were mentioned in the Domesday Book. The name of the village derives from Kirk (meaning church) and Dĩc-tūn; a town surrounded by a moat or ditch. At the 2001 Census, the population of the village was 386, which by the 2011 Census had risen to 484. In 2015, North Yorkshire County Council estimated the population to be 500.

Historically, the village and parish were in the Wetherby Rural District and the Wapentake of Claro. In 1974, the village was moved into North Yorkshire (from the West Riding of Yorkshire). From 1974 to 2023 it was part of the Borough of Harrogate, it is now administered by the unitary North Yorkshire Council.

== Architecture ==
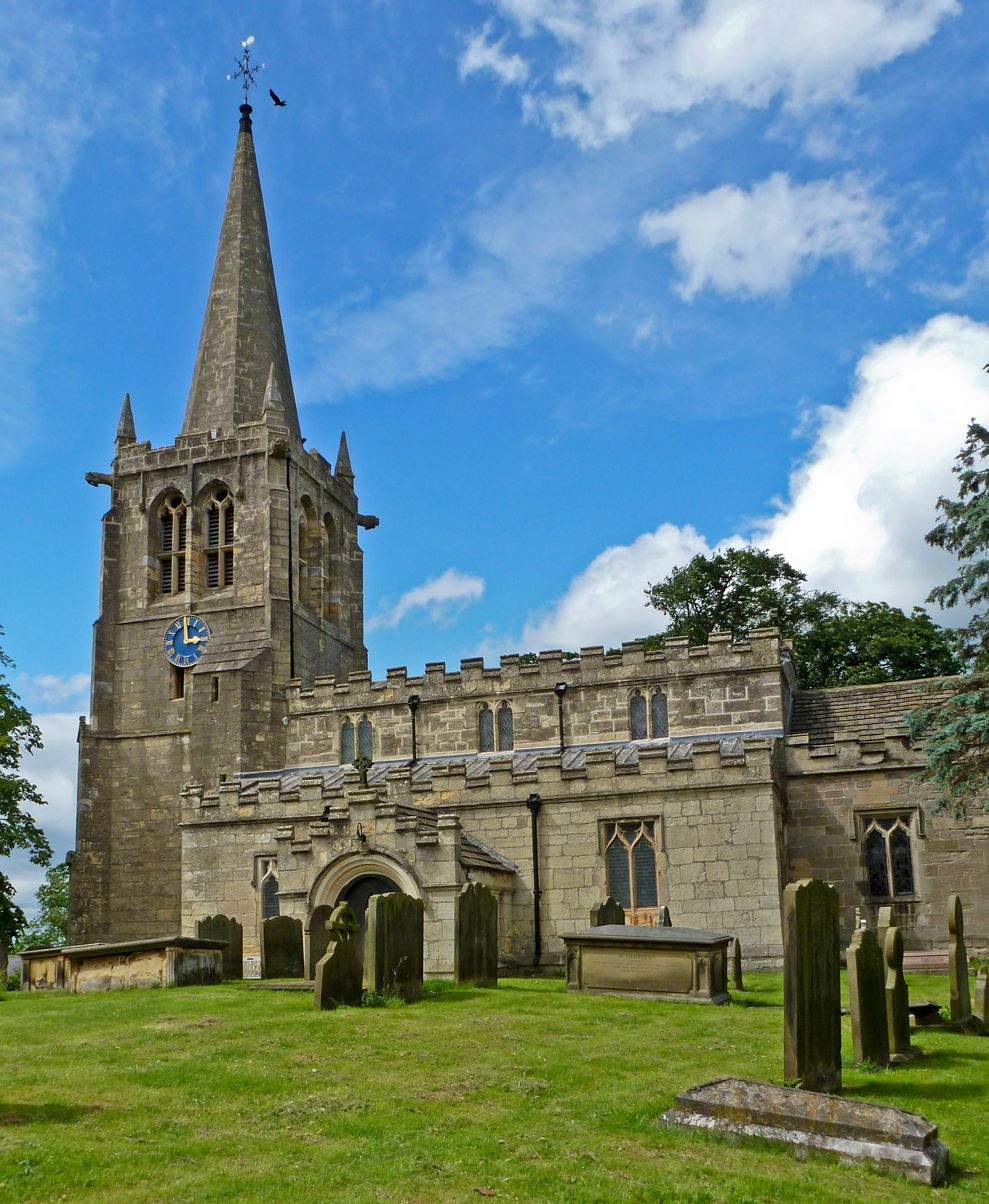
All Saints Church

The most architecturally notable building in the village is All Saints' Church, the main structure of which dates between the 12th and 14th century. Kirk Deighton Hall is a late 18th century private residence situated off Mark Lane and is Grade II listed. Main Street has a mixture of buildings dating from the 16th to the 19th century. There are some twentieth century council houses on Wetherby Road as well as some twentieth century private houses on Ashdale Lane.

== Amenities ==
The village has a church, a public house, a football club and club house, a cricket club that plays in the Nidderdale League and a village hall. Kirk Deighton amenities serve residents of the Ainsty and Badgerwood areas of north-east Wetherby.

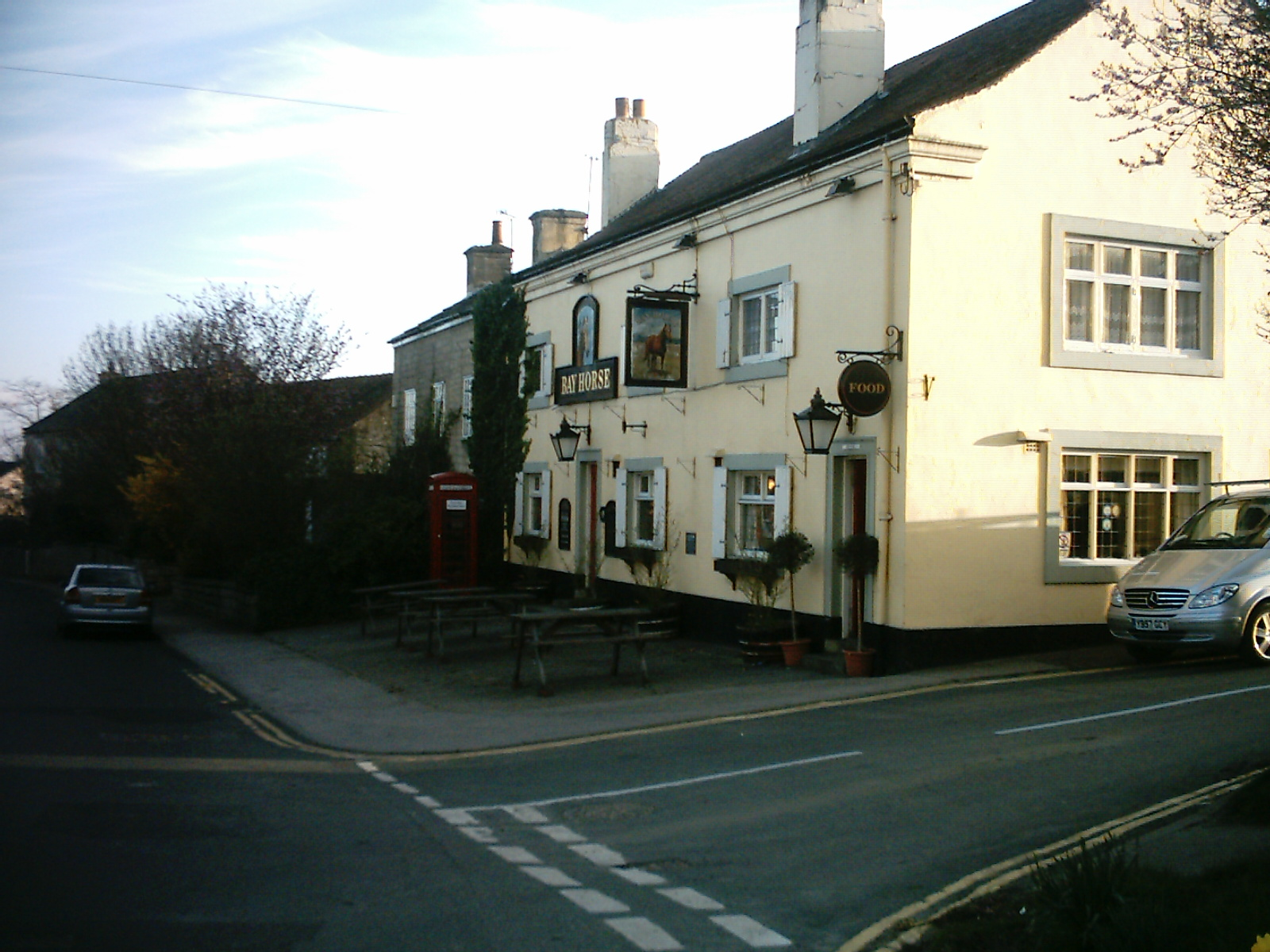
The Bay Horse

The Bay Horse public house in the centre of the village was originally two, the Bay Horse and The Grey Hound until they were converted into one pub, taking the Bay Horse name. The community centre was built in the mid-1970s, but fell into disrepair. It was demolished in 2012 and part of the land on which it stood was sold for housing raising funds for a new village hall, which was officially opened on the 8 September 2013.

== Kirk Deighton Site of Special Scientific Interest ==
Within the village is Kirk Deighton SSSI, a Site of Special Scientific Interest that is home to a population of Great Crested Newts (Triturus cristatus). The site is situated off Lime Kiln Lane and was designated in 2000. It is not publicly accessible.

== Transport ==
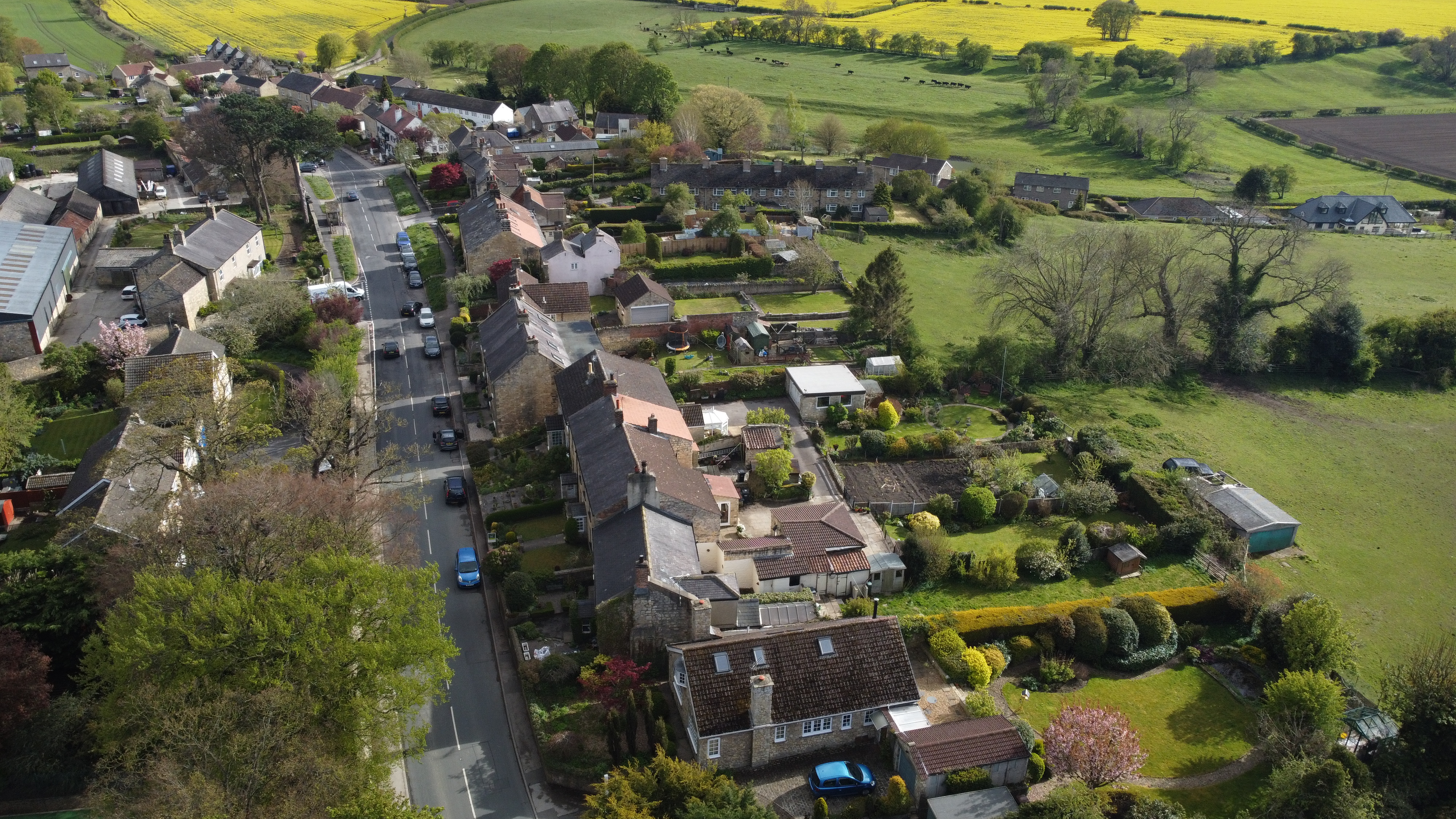
Aerial view of Kirk Deighton showing Main Street looking south

Wetherby services is centred on the A1(M) motorway junction 46, serving the village and north Wetherby. It was built during the upgrade of the A1 trunk road to motorway standard.

Kirk Deighton is served by route 8, Harrogate to Wetherby, and route X80, Wetherby to Knaresborough.

== Sport ==
Kirk Deighton has a football club; Kirk Deighton Rangers who play on Barr Field, and a Cricket club; Kirk Deighton Cricket Club who play on Mark Lane.

== Education ==
Kirk Deighton was endowed with a free school c. 1791 by a gift in the will of Sir Hugh Palliser. It was rebuilt in 1846, and again in 1893, becoming had a Church of England voluntary controlled primary school. The school closed in 1991. The building is now a private residence. The closest primary school is Deighton Gates in Wetherby and the closest secondary school is Wetherby High School, however as these lie across the border in West Yorkshire it is more common for children in Kirk Deighton to be educated in Spofforth and Knaresborough.

== Notable people ==
- Roger Manners, fifth earl of Rutland, was born in the village
- Admiral Sir Hugh Palliser, 1st Bart, (22 February 1722 – 19 March 1796) was born in the village. He was an officer of the British Royal Navy during the Seven Years' War and the American Revolutionary War.
- Doctor Reverend Myra Shackley, was incumbent vicar at Kirk Deighton between 2009 and 2015

== See also ==
- Listed buildings in Kirk Deighton
