= Myra Shackley =

British author (born 1949)

Myra Lesley Shackley (born 5 March 1949) was formerly Professor of Culture Resource Management and Head of the Centre for Tourism and Visitor Management at Nottingham Trent University Business School. She retired in summer 2011. She has written 15 books (of which the latest is Atlas of Travel and Tourism Development, a core text for historical geography and tourism studies. Much of her recent research has been concerned with the management of sacred sites as visitor attractions and she wrote the textbook 'Managing Sacred Sites; service provision and visitor experience'.

== Career ==
After gaining a PhD in Archaeology at the University of Southampton she spent four years as head of the laboratory at the Institute of Archaeology at Oxford before becoming a lecturer and later Head of Department of Archaeological Sciences at the University of Leicester before moving to Nottingham in 1986 to develop her work on the management of archaeological and historic sites at Nottingham Business School.

Shackley is also a priest in the Church of England (ordained 1999) and was the Tourism Advisor to Southwell Diocese and priest-vicar at Southwell Minster until 2009. After this, she moved to North Yorkshire as the Parish Priest of Spofforth, Kirk Deighton, Follifoot and Little Ribston, but retired in 2015. She is a Capitular Canon and member of the Chapter of Ripon cathedral.

== Research ==
Her academic output includes reviews, consultancy and more than two hundred academic articles and international conference papers. She has been involved in international research projects in sub-Saharan Africa (mostly Namibia but also Lesotho, Botswana and South Africa), West Africa (Mali), Kingdom of Lo (northern Nepal/Tibet), Rajasthan and Arunachal Pradesh (India), Guyana (consultancy for Esmée Fairbairn Charitable Trust), and Uzbekistan.

== Bibliography ==
- Myra Shackley, Archaeological Sediments : A Survey of Analytical Methods (London; Boston : Butterworths, 1975) ISBN 0-408-70664-3
- Myra Shackley, Rocks and Man (London: Allen Unwin, 1977) ISBN 0-312-68799-0
- Myra L Shackley, 'The Hamwih Brickearths' in Philip Holdsworth, CBA Research Report No. 33: Excavations at Melbourne Street, Southampton, 1971-76 (Oxford: Council for British Archaeology, 1980) ISBN 0-900312-82-3
- Myra Shackley (1980), Neanderthal Man
- Myra Shackley, Environmental Archaeology (London: Allen Unwin, 1982)
- Myra Shackley, "Wildmen: Yeti, Sasquatch, and the Neanderthal Enigma (London: Thames & Hudson, 1983)
- Myra Shackley, 'Palaeolithic archaeology in the Mongolian People's Republic: a report on the state of the art', Proceedings of the Prehistoric Society 50 (1984)
- Myra Shackley, Using Environmental Archaeology (London: Batsford, 1985) ISBN 0-7134-4850-4
- Deanna Swaney, and Myra Shackley. Lonely Planet Survival Kit: Zimbabwe, Botswana and Namibia (London: Lonely Planet, 1995) ISBN 0-86442-313-6
- Myra Shackley, WildLife Tourism (London: Thomson Learning, 1996) ISBN 0-415-11539-6
- Myra Shackley, Visitor Management: Case Studies from World Heritage Sites (London: Butterworth-Heinemann, 1998) ISBN 0-7506-3279-8
- Deanna Swaney, and Myra Shackley. Lonely Planet Country Guide: Zimbabwe, Botswana and Namibia (London: Lonely Planet, 1999) ISBN 0-86442-545-7
- Myra Shackley, Managing Sacred Sites: Service Provision and Visitor Experience (London: Thomson Learning, 2001) ISBN 0-8264-5141-1
- Deanna Swaney, Myra Shackley, Tione Chinula, and Vincent Talbot. Lonely Planet Country Guide: Zimbabwe (London: Lonely Planet, 2002) ISBN 1-74059-043-0
- Myra Shackley, 'Management challenges for religion-based attractions' in Alan Fyall, Brian Garrod, and Anna Leask (eds.), Managing Visitor Attractions: New Directions (London: Butterworth-Heinemann, 2003) ISBN 0-7506-5381-7
- Myra Shackley, Atlas of Travel and Tourism Development (London: Butterworth-Heinemann, 2006) ISBN 0-7506-6348-0
