= Spofforth with Stockeld =

Civil parish in North Yorkshire, England

Coordinates: 53.950°N 1.450°W

- Civil parish
- Location within North Yorkshire
- Population: 1,169 (2011 census)
- OS grid reference: SE360505
- Civil parish: Spofforth with Stockeld
- Unitary authority: North Yorkshire
- Ceremonial county: North Yorkshire
- Region: Yorkshire and the Humber
- Country: England
- Sovereign state: United Kingdom
- Post town: HARROGATE
- Postcode district: HG3
- Police: North Yorkshire
- Fire: North Yorkshire
- Ambulance: Yorkshire
- UK Parliament: Wetherby and Easingwold

Spofforth with Stockeld is a civil parish in the county of North Yorkshire, England.

According to the 2001 UK census, Spofforth with Stockeld parish had a population of 1,121, increasing to 1,169 at the 2011 census.

The parish includes the ruins of Spofforth Castle and the 2,000-acre (810 ha) Stockeld Park estate.

== Governance ==
Spofforth with Stockeld parish is in the Harrogate Borough electoral ward of Spofforth with Lower Wharfedale. This ward stretches south-west to Huby and has a total population of 3,100 at the 2011 Census.

Until 1974 it was part of the West Riding of Yorkshire. From 1974 to 2023 it was part of the Borough of Harrogate, it is now administered by the unitary North Yorkshire Council.

== See also ==
- Spofforth, North Yorkshire
- Listed buildings in Spofforth with Stockeld
