= Railway Inn, Spofforth =

Former pub in North Yorkshire, England

Railway Inn
- The pub in 2019, prior to its closure in 2020
- Interactive map of the Railway Inn area

General information
- Type: Public house (former)
- Location: Park Road, Spofforth, Harrogate, England
- Coordinates: 53.950855°N 1.443431°W
- Closed: 2020
- Owner: Samuel Smith's

The Railway Inn is a former public house on Park Road in Spofforth, North Yorkshire, England.

== Description ==
The Railway Inn is a typical English pub with a public bar and a lounge. It served one cask beer, Samuel Smith Old Brewery Bitter, and some lagers, which were kept in the pub's cellar. Historic photographs of the village are displayed on the interior walls of the pub.

No brewery logos are shown outside, as Samuel Smith's has adopted a policy of not displaying its name on its pubs. In 2019 the brewery introduced rules banning the use of mobile telephones, tablets and laptops inside its pubs, with the aim of discouraging activities that inhibit conversation.

The Railway Inn closed in 2020, with the freehold owners, Samuel Smith's, seeking new tenants. As of October 2026, there has been no public update on its status or future.

== Gallery ==
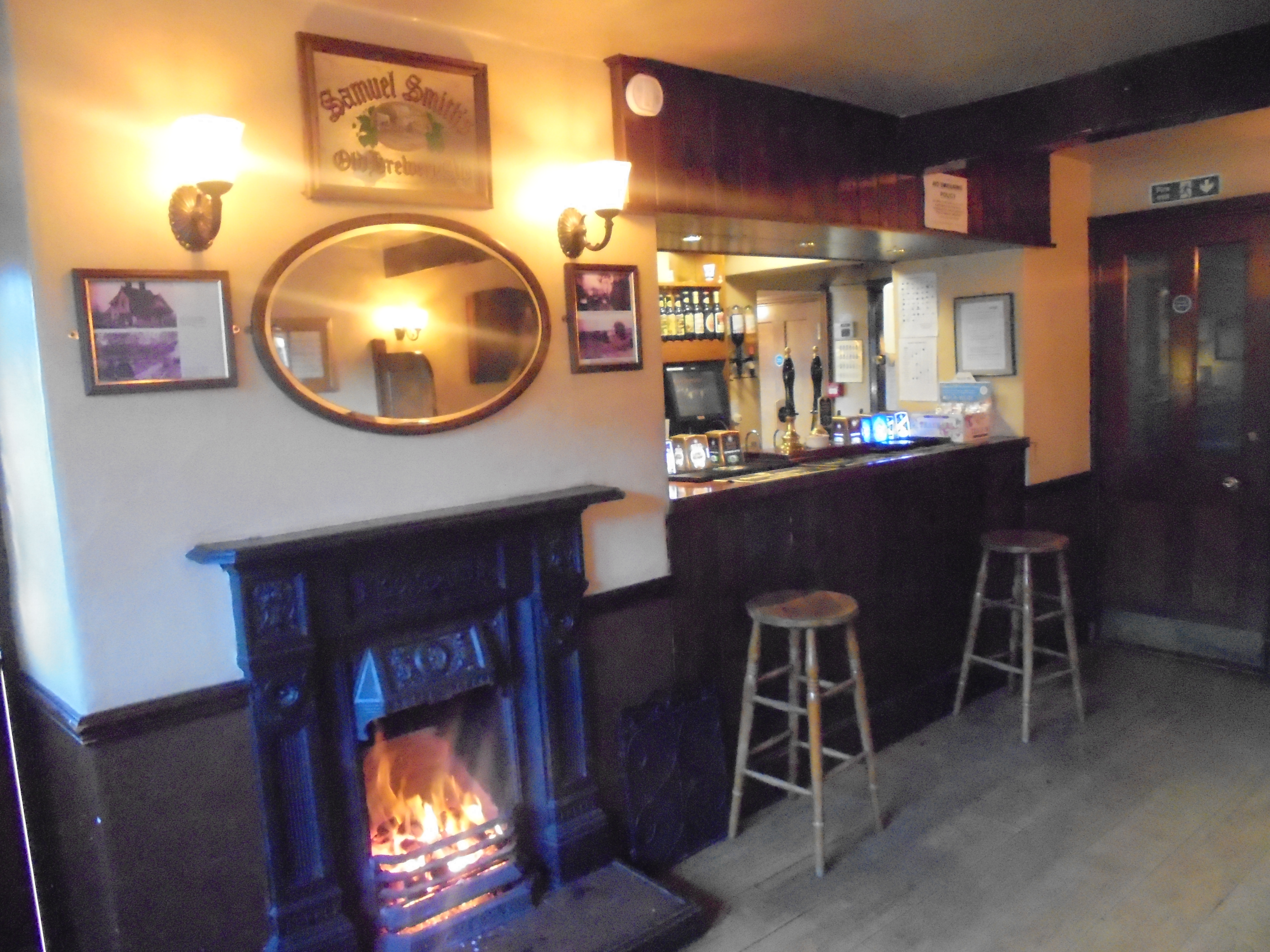
Public bar

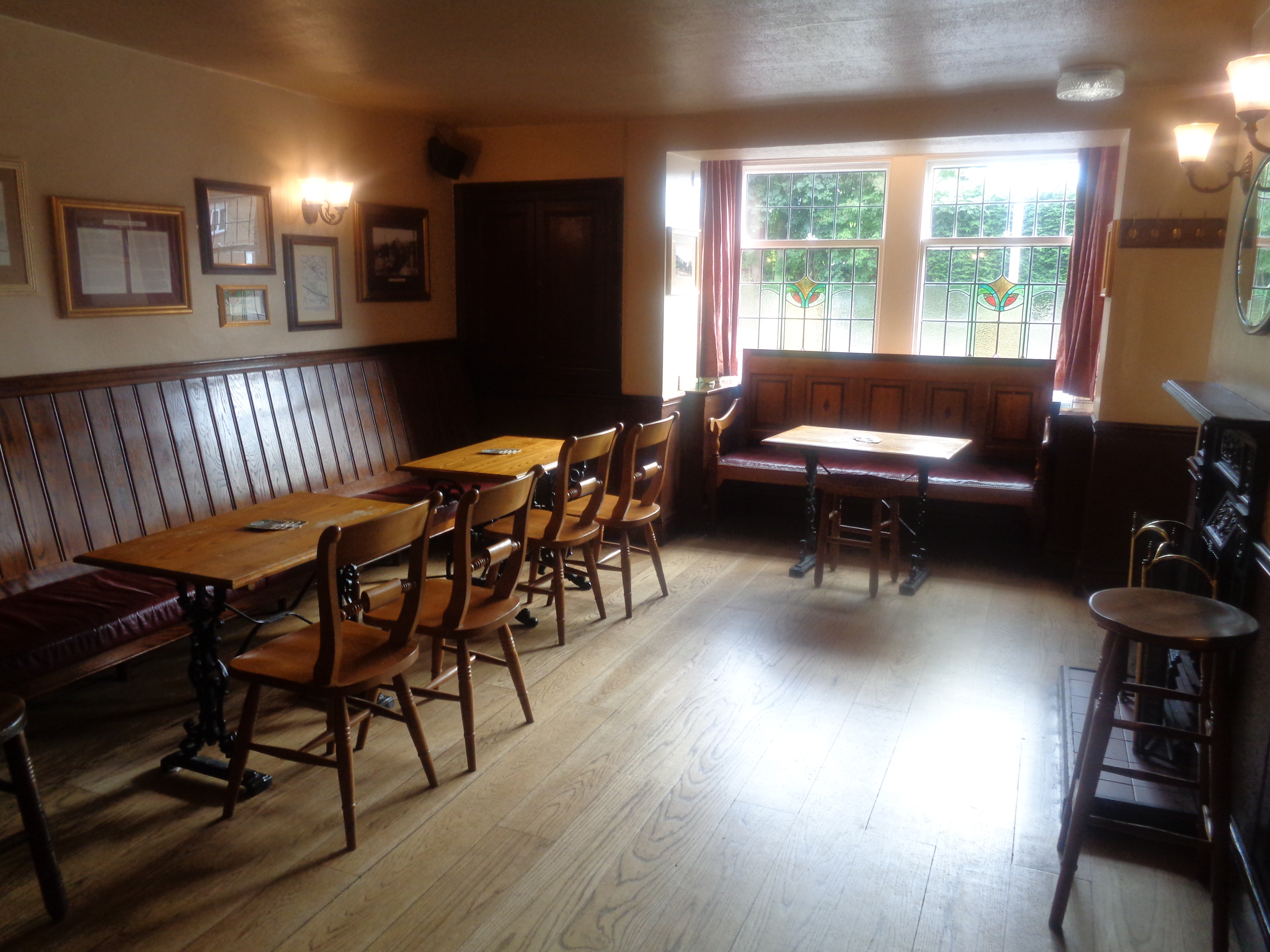
Public bar

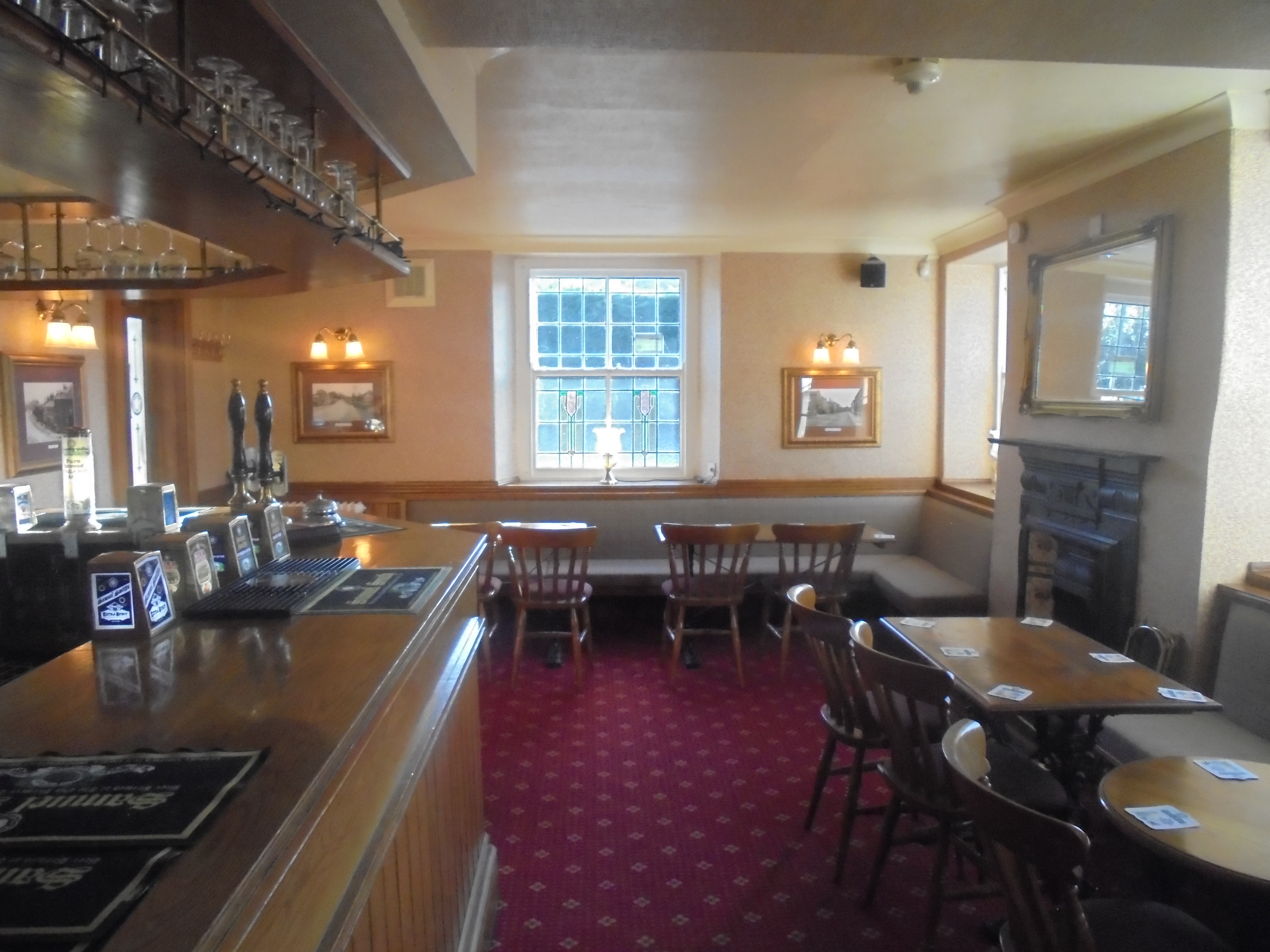
Lounge

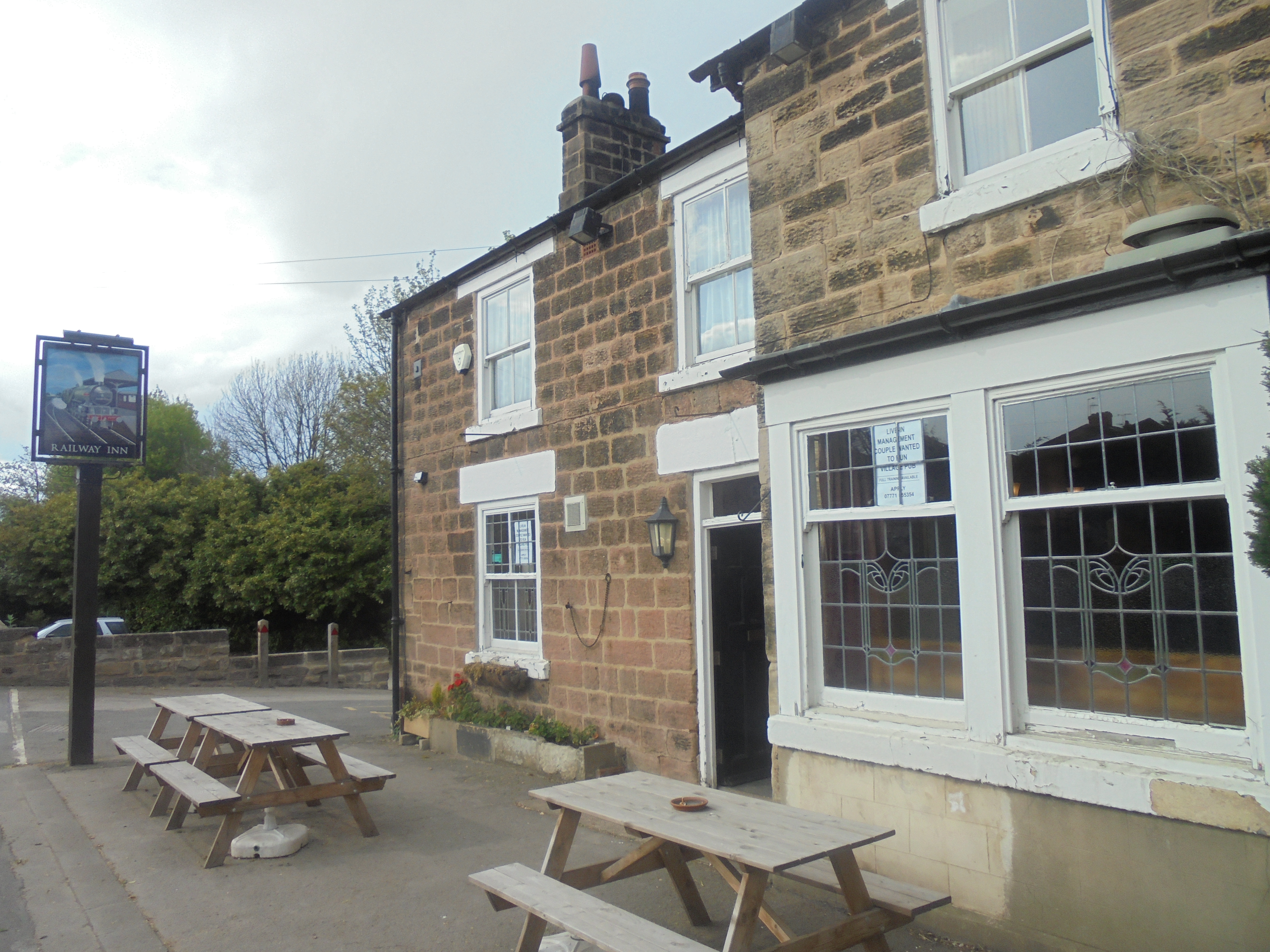
Front elevation
