= John Metcalf (civil engineer) =

English road builder (1717–1810)

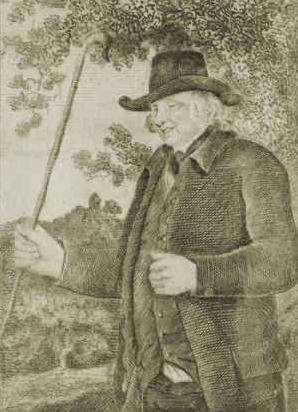
- John Metcalf, also known as Blind Jack of Knaresborough. By J R Smith in the Life of John Metcalf published 1801
- Born: 15 August 1717; Knaresborough, West Riding of Yorkshire, England
- Died: 26 April 1810 (aged 92); Spofforth, West Riding of Yorkshire, England

John Metcalf (15 August 1717 – 26 April 1810), known as Blind Jack of Knaresborough or Blind Jack Metcalf, was an English road builder, the first professional road builder to emerge during the Industrial Revolution. Blind from the age of six, Metcalf had an eventful life, which was documented by his own account just before his death. He was an accomplished diver, swimmer, card player and fiddler, but was better known for the period between 1765 and 1792 when he built about 180 miles (290 km) of turnpike road, mainly in the north of England, and as such, he became known as one of the fathers of the modern road.

Metcalf's career spent on the roads in the region has been commemorated in a pub named after him, a statue in Knaresborough town centre and part of the A658 in Harrogate being named 'John Metcalf Way'.

== Early life ==
Metcalf was born into a poor family in Knaresborough in Yorkshire, England on 15 August 1717. His father was a horse breeder. At the age of six John lost his sight after a smallpox infection; he was given fiddle lessons as a way of making provision for him to earn a living later in life. He became an accomplished fiddler and made it his livelihood in his early adult years. In 1732, aged 15, Metcalf succeeded one Mr Morrison as fiddler at the Queen's Head, a tavern in Harrogate. Morrison had played there for 70 years. Metcalf had an affinity for horses and added to his living with horse trading. Despite being blind, he took up swimming and diving, fighting cocks, playing cards, riding and even hunting. He knew his local area so well he was paid to work as a guide to visitors.

When he was 20, Metcalf met Dorothy Benson, the daughter of the landlord of the Granby Inn in Harrogate. When he was aged 21 he met another woman and made her pregnant; Dorothy begged him not to marry her and Jack fled. He spent some time living at places on the North Sea coast between Newcastle and London, and lodged with his aunt in Whitby. He continued to work as a fiddler. When he heard Dorothy was to be married to a shoemaker, he returned and they fled so they could get married in secret. They married and had four children. Dorothy died in 1778.

Metcalf's fiddle playing gave him social connections and a patron, Colonel Liddell, Member of Parliament for Berwick-on-Tweed. In a much-repeated story, in 1739 the colonel and Metcalf had a wager of 10 guineas as to who could travel the 207 miles (333 km) from London to Harrogate first; Jack on foot or the colonel in his coach. Jack took five and half days, and arrived first, despite his blindness, the state of the roads having slowed the colonel.

During the Jacobite rising of 1745 Metcalf, through his connections, obtained the job of assistant to the royal recruiting sergeant in the Knaresborough area. He accompanied the army to Edinburgh where he did not experience action but was employed moving guns over boggy ground. He was captured but released. He used his military experience to source stockings from Aberdeen for the local market in Yorkshire.

== Career ==
Before army service, Metcalf worked as a carrier using a four-wheeled chaise and a one-horse chair on local trips. When competition cut into the business he switched to carrying fish from the coast to Leeds and Manchester. After 1745 he bought a stone wagon and worked it between York and Knaresborough. By 1754 his business had grown to a stagecoach line. He drove the coach himself, making two trips a week during the summer and one in the winter months.

== Road builder ==
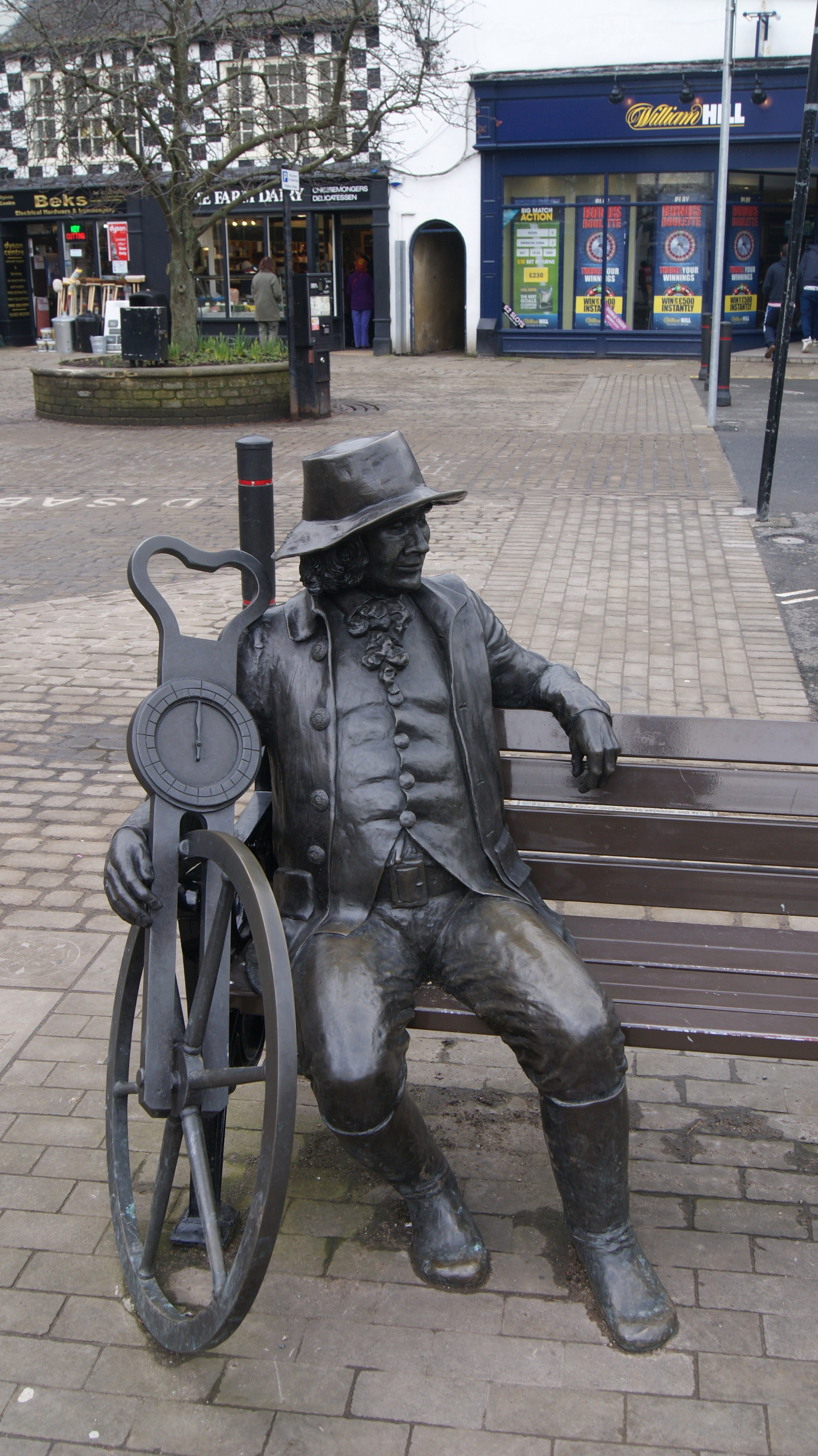
Statue of Blind Jack Metcalf, Market Place, Knaresborough, North Yorkshire. The device in his hand is a Viameter (Surveyor's wheel).

In 1765, Parliament passed an act authorising turnpike trusts to build toll roads in the Knaresborough area. There were few people with road-building experience and Metcalf seized the opportunity, building on his practical experience as a carrier.

Metcalf won a contract to build a three-mile (5 km) section of road between Minskip and Ferrensby on the road from Harrogate to Boroughbridge. He explored the section of countryside alone and worked out the most practical route.

Metcalf built roads in Lancashire, Derbyshire, Cheshire and Yorkshire, including roads between:

- Knaresborough and Wetherby
- Wakefield, Huddersfield and Saddleworth (via the Standedge pass)
- Bury and Blackburn with a branch to Accrington
- Skipton, Colne and Burnley

Metcalf believed a good road should have good foundations, be well drained and have a smooth convex surface to allow rainwater to drain quickly into ditches at the side. He understood the importance of good drainage, knowing it was rain that caused most problems. He worked out a way to build a road across a bog using a series of rafts made from ling (a type of heather) and furze (gorse) tied in bundles as foundations. It established his reputation as a road builder because other engineers believed it could not be done.

Metcalf mastered his trade with his own method of calculating costs and materials, which he could never explain to others, and he became known as one of the fathers of the modern road along with Thomas Telford and John MacAdam.

== Later life ==
Competition from canals cut into Metcalf's profits and he retired in 1792 to live with a daughter and her husband at Spofforth in Yorkshire. Throughout his career he built 180 miles (290 km) of road. At 77 he walked to York, where he related a detailed account of his life to a publisher.

Blind Jack of Knaresborough died aged 92 on 26 April 1810, at his home in Spofforth where he is buried in the churchyard of All Saints' Church.

== Memorials ==
A658 road name sign, near Harrogate

In 2009, a statue of John Metcalf was placed in the market square in Knaresborough, across from Blind Jack's pub.

On 7 July 2017, the A658, the Harrogate Southern Bypass, was named 'John Metcalf Way'.

== Epitaph ==
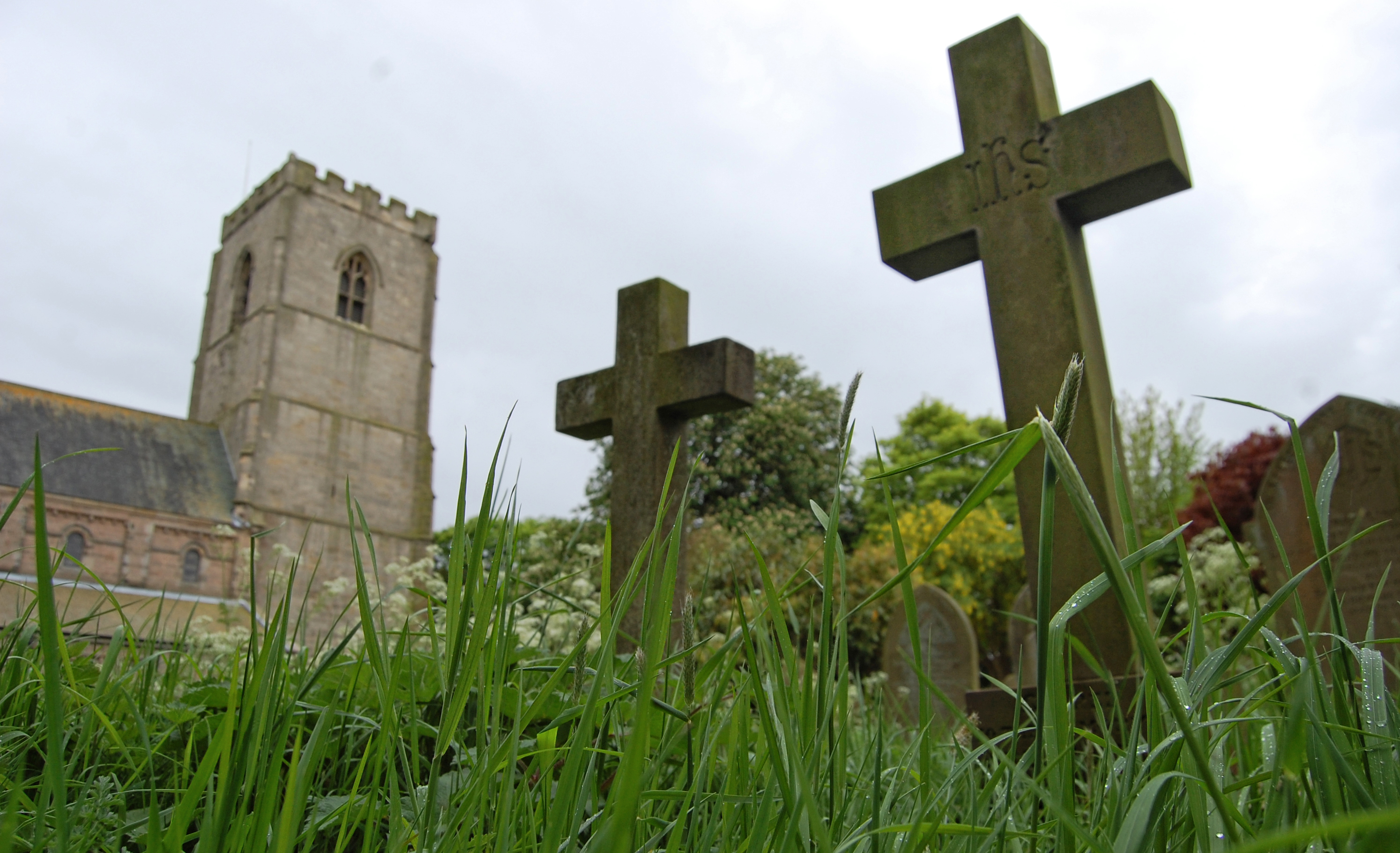
All Saints' Church graveyard, Spofforth; Metcalf's final resting place.

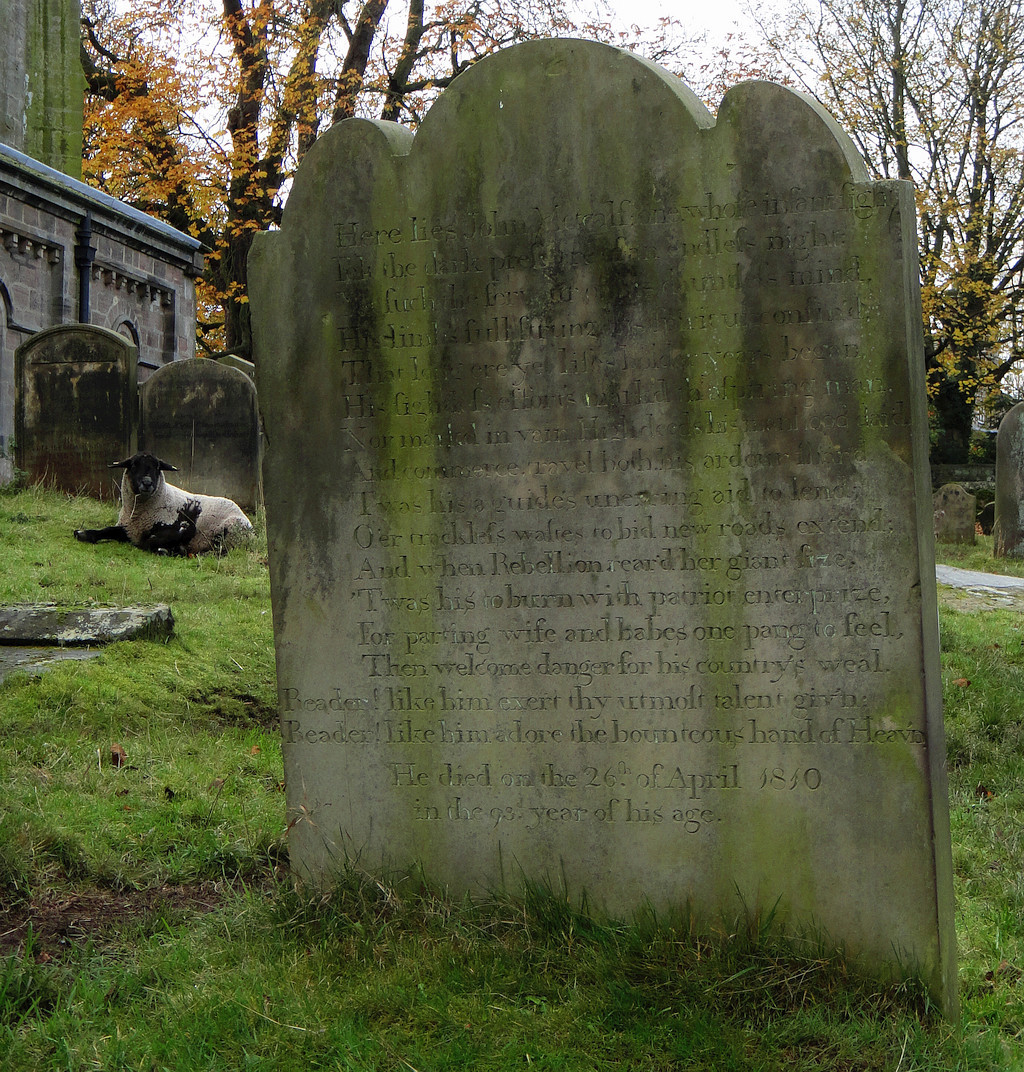
Headstone at All Saints' Church, Spofforth.

Metcalf's headstone, erected in the churchyard of All Saints' Church, Spofforth, at the cost of Lord Dundas, bears this epitaph:

"Here lies John Metcalf, one whose infant sight
Felt the dark pressure of an endless night;
Yet such the fervour of his dauntless mind,
His limbs full strung, his spirits unconfined,
That, long ere yet life's bolder years began,
The sightless efforts mark'd th' aspiring man;
Nor mark'd in vain—high deeds his manhood dared,
And commerce, travel, both his ardour shared.
'Twas his a guide's unerring aid to lend—
O'er trackless wastes to bid new roads extend;
And, when rebellion reared her giant size,
'Twas his to burn with patriot enterprise;
For parting wife and babes, one pang to feel,
Then welcome danger for his country's weal.
Reader, like him, exert thy utmost talent given!
Reader, like him, adore the bounteous hand of Heaven."
