= All Saints' Church, Spofforth, North Yorkshire =

All Saints' Parish Church
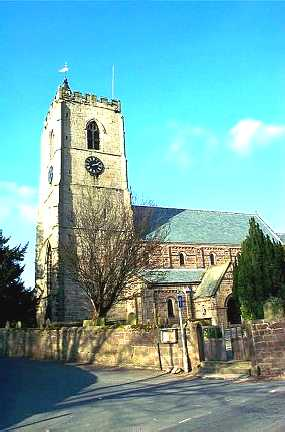
- All Saints' Church
- All Saints' Parish Church
- 53°57′16.2″N 1°26′45″W
- OS grid reference: SE 36464 51079
- Location: Spofforth, North Yorkshire
- Country: England
- Denomination: Church of England
- Churchmanship: Central

Administration
- Province: York
- Diocese: Leeds
- Parish: Spofforth and Kirk Deighton

All Saints Church is an Anglican church in the parish of Spofforth and Kirk Deighton in North Yorkshire, England.

== History ==
The earliest parts of the church are of Norman origin, however the church was remodelled somewhat in the 15th century. The 15th-century enlargements were thought to be unnecessary after the building of a church in Wetherby and the church was again remodelled in 1854–55 by JW Hugall, with the nave and chancel being returned to Norman style.

In 1971 the ecclesiastical parishes of Spofforth, Kirk Deighton, Follifoot and Little Ribston were merged to form the Parish of Spofforth and Kirk Deighton in the Diocese of Ripon. The parish transferred to the Diocese of Leeds in 2014.

The blind road-builder John Metcalf (1717-1810) is buried in the churchyard.

== Buildings ==
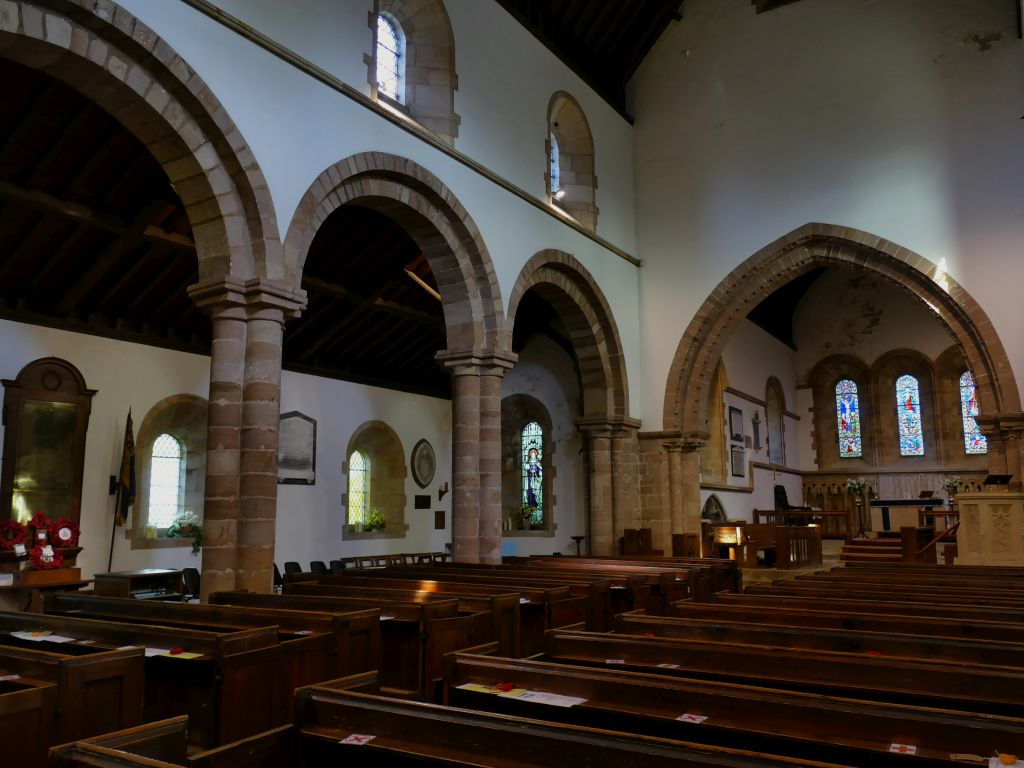
Interior of the chancel

The buildings are Grade II* listed. Most of the current church dates back from the 1854–55 remodelling under the Reverend James Tripp, however the tower is 15th century and contains four bells; three of which date from the late 16th or early 17th century.

== See also ==
- Grade II* listed buildings in North Yorkshire (district)
- Listed buildings in Spofforth with Stockeld
- All Saints' Church, Kirk Deighton
