= Gerald Smithson =

English cricketer

Personal information
- Full name: Gerald Arthur Smithson
- Born: 1 November 1926; Spofforth, West Riding of Yorkshire, England
- Died: 6 September 1970 (aged 43); Abingdon, Oxfordshire, England
- Batting: Left-handed
- Bowling: Right-arm medium

International information
- National side: England
- Test debut: 21 January 1948 v West Indies
- Last Test: 11 February 1948 v West Indies

Career statistics
Competition	Test	First-class
Matches	2	200
Runs scored	70	6,940
Batting average	23.33	22.67
100s/50s	0/0	8/31
Top score	35	169
Balls bowled	–	94
Wickets	–	1
Bowling average	–	117.00
5 wickets in innings	–	0
10 wickets in match	–	0
Best bowling	–	1/26
Catches/stumpings	0/–	131/–
- Source: CricInfo, 9 September 2022

Gerald Arthur Smithson (1 November 1926 – 6 September 1970) was an English cricketer who played in two Tests for England in 1947–48. He was born at Spofforth, West Riding of Yorkshire and died at Abingdon, Oxfordshire. His original family surname was Smithsons but the final 's' was left off his birth certificate by his father.

== Life and career ==
Smithson was a left-handed middle-order batsman, a medium pace bowler and a highly agile and effective fielder of the ball. He graduated from the Bradford Cricket League to play first-class cricket for Yorkshire between 1946 and 1950, making his first-class debut on 10–11 July 1946 aged 19 in a match against Essex at St George's Road, Harrogate, taking a catch and scoring 16 runs in Yorkshire's six-wicket victory. His highest innings for Yorkshire was his 169 runs playing at No. 3 against Leicestershire at Grace Road, Leicester in August 1947. Smithson played for Leicestershire between 1951 and 1956, and then for Hertfordshire in Minor Counties cricket between 1957 and 1962.

Smithson's 98 for Yorkshire in the Roses Match of 1947 against Lancashire when he was aged 20 has been described in the writings of broadcaster and journalist Michael Parkinson (Parkinson's Lore, London: Pavilion, 1981). According to the then Yorkshire captain, Norman Yardley, his batting invited comparison with the young Australians of the time. Cricket historian Alan Hill (author) wrote that this particular innings "aroused hopes of an exciting future" and compared the style of the later England left-hander David Gower to that of Smithson.

Conscripted into National Service as a Bevin Boy in the coal mines, he worked for three years at Askern Main Colliery in South Yorkshire, before receiving special permission (after his case had been debated in the House of Commons) for temporary release so that he could join the tour to the West Indies with the Marylebone Cricket Club (MCC) team of 1947–48. Smithson took part in two Test matches in the Kensington Oval in Bridgetown, Barbados and the Queen's Park Oval in Port of Spain, Trinidad – where the West Indies trio of Frank Worrell, Clyde Walcott and Everton Weekes first appeared together. He was not successful in the first game, but made 35 in each innings of the 2nd Test, and his durability at the wicket helped to save the match for England. He was then injured on the tour, and did not play for Yorkshire in 1948. A photograph of Smithson wearing his pit clothes appeared in Wisden in 1948 on page 38.

In 1949, Smithson was part of Norman Yardley's side that won the County Championship, sharing the title with Middlesex. His last recorded appearance for Yorkshire was a match against Scotland at Edinburgh in July 1950.

In 1951 he joined Leicestershire County Cricket Club, with whom he remained until the close of the 1956 season. His best season there was in 1952, when he hit 1,264 runs, (including two centuries) averaging 28.08. His last first-class match was for Leicestershire against Northamptonshire at the County Ground, Northampton, in August 1956.

He married Anne Salter at St Peter's Church, Earley, Berkshire, in 1954. Together they had four daughters; Jacqueline (born 1956), Gillian (1958), Joanne (1964) and Justine (1966).

After his full-time professional playing career ended, Smithson served as a professional cricket coach and groundsman, first at Caterham School, Surrey, and then at Abingdon School, Oxfordshire, and played Minor Counties cricket for Hertfordshire County Cricket Club. He was also a playing member of The Forty Club.

Gerald Smithson died suddenly in Abingdon, Oxfordshire in September 1970, at the age of 43, as a result of a coronary. At the time of his death, Abingdon was in Berkshire.

The Gerald Smithson Memorial Twenty20 Cricket Tournament was inaugurated at Abingdon School on 21 June 2009, with former England cricketer Devon Malcolm as the guest of honour.
