= A658 road =

A-road in Yorkshire, England

A658

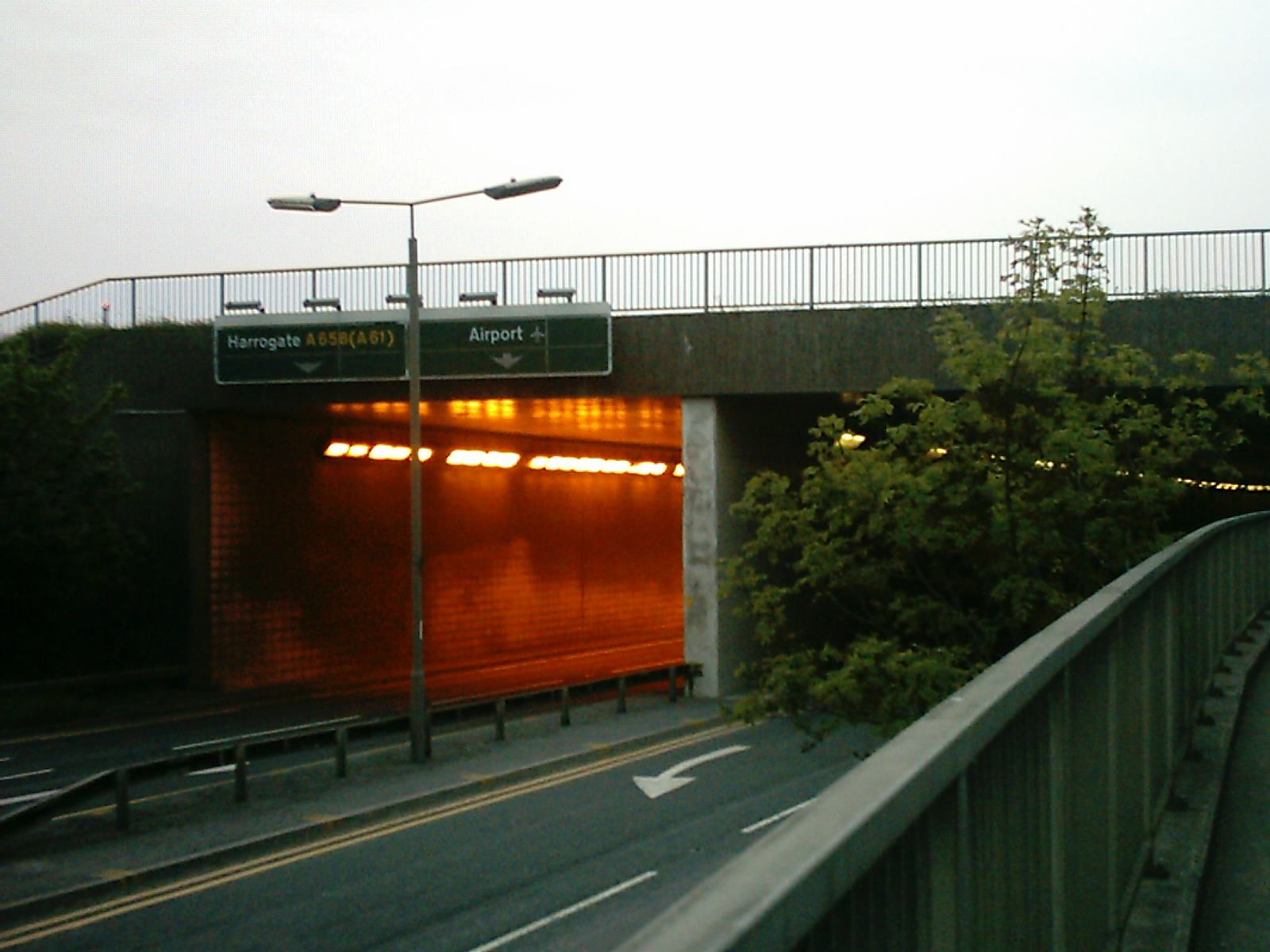
- The A658 dual carriageway plus a pedestrian walkway runs under the main runway at Leeds Bradford International Airport

Major junctions
- East end: Knaresborough
- West end: Bradford

Location
- Country: United Kingdom
- Constituent country: England

Road network
- Roads in the United Kingdom; Motorways; A and B road zones

The A658 is a road in Yorkshire, England.

== Route ==
It runs from Bradford, West Yorkshire (53.7949°N 1.7487°W), to Knaresborough, North Yorkshire (54.0065°N 1.4327°W), passing along the way Leeds Bradford International Airport, where it runs through a tunnel directly under the main runway. The road starts near to the cathedral in Bradford, crossing the A650 almost immediately as it heads north westwards from the city. The A658 originally terminated south of the village of Pannal at the junction with the A61, but was extended when the south Harrogate and Knaresborough bypass was built and the road now ends east of Knaresborough where it meets the A59.

== Places along the A658 ==
- Bradford
- Eccleshill
- Greengates
- Apperley Bridge
- Leeds
- Yeadon
- Leeds Bradford International Airport
- Pool in Wharfedale
- Huby
- Harrogate Spa
- Knaresborough
