= William Osborne Greenwood =

William Osborne Greenwood FRSE (1873–1947) was a curious (and perhaps unique) Briton qualified both as a surgeon and a minister of religion. He wrote on both subjects. Issues covering both fields included debates on the agony of childbirth. His book Biology and Christian Belief ran to several editions.

== Life ==
He was born in Halifax, West Yorkshire. He attended Skipton Grammar School then the University of Leeds before studying medicine at the University of London, graduating MB BS in 1903.

In 1922 he was elected a fellow of the Royal Society of Edinburgh. His proposers were John William Ballantyne, James Haig Ferguson, Sir John Halliday Croom and Alexander Hugh Freeland Barbour.

In 1930 he began a completely new career and was ordained as a deacon in the Church of England. He became curate of Spofforth, North Yorkshire.

He died on 8 January 1947.

== Publications ==
- A Study in Twilight Sleep (1916)
- Scopolamine-morphine: Semi-Narcosis During Labour (1919)
- Biology and Christian Belief (1938)
- Christianity and the Mechanists (1941)
