= Ingmanthorpe, North Yorkshire =

Hamlet in North Yorkshire, England

Coordinates: 53.95239°N 1.36390°W

Ingmanthorpe
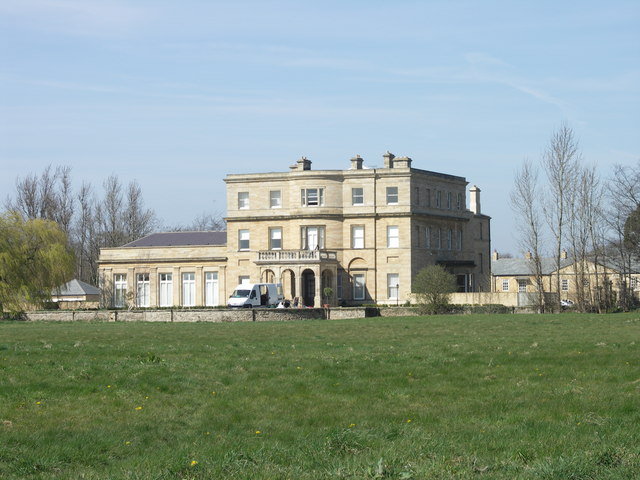
- Ingmanthorpe Hall

- Location within North Yorkshire
- OS grid reference: SE418508
- Civil parish: Kirk Deighton
- Unitary authority: North Yorkshire
- Ceremonial county: North Yorkshire
- Region: Yorkshire and the Humber
- Country: England
- Sovereign state: United Kingdom
- Post town: WETHERBY
- Postcode district: LS22
- Police: North Yorkshire
- Fire: North Yorkshire
- Ambulance: Yorkshire

Ingmanthorpe is a hamlet close to the village of Kirk Deighton in North Yorkshire, England, the village is situated approximately 2 miles (3.2 km) north of the town of Wetherby in neighbouring West Yorkshire. Ingmanthorpe is situated close to the A1(M) and Wetherby Service Station. Grand National winning jockey, Richard Guest, trained racehorses at Ingmanthorpe Racing Stables until his eviction in May 2021. Ingmanthorpe Hall was home to Wennington School from 1945 to 1975, and was designated a Grade II listed building in 1966.
