= Spofforth, North Yorkshire =

Village in North Yorkshire, England

Coordinates: 53°57′14″N 1°26′51″W

Spofforth
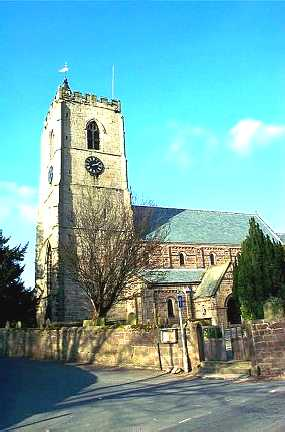
- All Saints' Church

- Location within North Yorkshire
- OS grid reference: SE364510
- Civil parish: Spofforth with Stockeld
- Unitary authority: North Yorkshire
- Ceremonial county: North Yorkshire
- Region: Yorkshire and the Humber
- Country: England
- Sovereign state: United Kingdom
- Post town: HARROGATE
- Postcode district: HG3
- Police: North Yorkshire
- Fire: North Yorkshire
- Ambulance: Yorkshire
- UK Parliament: Wetherby and Easingwold

Spofforth /ˈspɒfərθ/ is a village in the civil parish of Spofforth with Stockeld, in North Yorkshire, England. It is about 3 miles (4.8 km) north-west of Wetherby and 5 miles (8 km) south of Harrogate, on the River Crimple, a tributary of the River Nidd.

== Etymology ==
The name Spofforth is attested in the Domesday Book of 1086, in the forms Spoford and Spoforde, while twelfth- and thirteenth-century spellings of the name include Spotford. The name comes from the Old English words spot, a "plot of land" and ford, "ford", and meant "plot of land by the ford"; the ford passed through Crimple Beck.

== History ==
Spofforth grew at the time that Knaresborough was the important town in the area, with Harrogate and Wetherby being less so. Spofforth Castle was built in the thirteenth century. Eighteenth-century Knaresborough road builder Blind Jack Metcalf spent the latter years of his life in the village and is buried in the church yard. Stockeld Park, a Palladian villa was built in the 19th century.

The railway came to Spofforth in 1847, with the building of the Harrogate to Church Fenton Line; Spofforth was the only intermediate station between Wetherby York Road and Harrogate stations. The line closed to passengers in 1964 and to goods in 1966, as part of the Beeching Axe.

Spofforth was a part of the historic West Riding of Yorkshire until 1974. From 1974 to 2023 it was part of the Borough of Harrogate; it is now administered by the unitary North Yorkshire Council.

== Churches ==
All Saints' Church is the parish church for Spofforth and Kirk Deighton with Follifoot and Little Ribston; it is a Grade II* listed building. The church has origins in the 12th century and the tower dates from the 15th. Most of the rest dates from a Victorian rebuilding undertaken in 1855 by the Rev James Tripp. The architect was J. W. Hugall. The church was reopened in September 1855 by the Lord Bishop of Ripon. There was criticism at the time of the "most ugly and objectionable pew" which occupied the south side of the church, and the fact that "the seats on the north are, consequently, incorrectly arranged".

Rev Tripp also paid for schools at Follifoot and at Linton and Spofforth.

Spofforth Methodist Church, which is no longer in active use, is sited on School Lane.

== Pubs ==
The Castle has a single open plan room. The closed Railway Inn is owned by Samuel Smith Old Brewery and was converted from two railway cottages. The King William IV closed in the early 2000s and became a private residence (Hanover House) The Prince of Wales in Castle Street closed around 1927 and is a private residence (Oulton House). It was the place where village inquests were held in the 1800s.

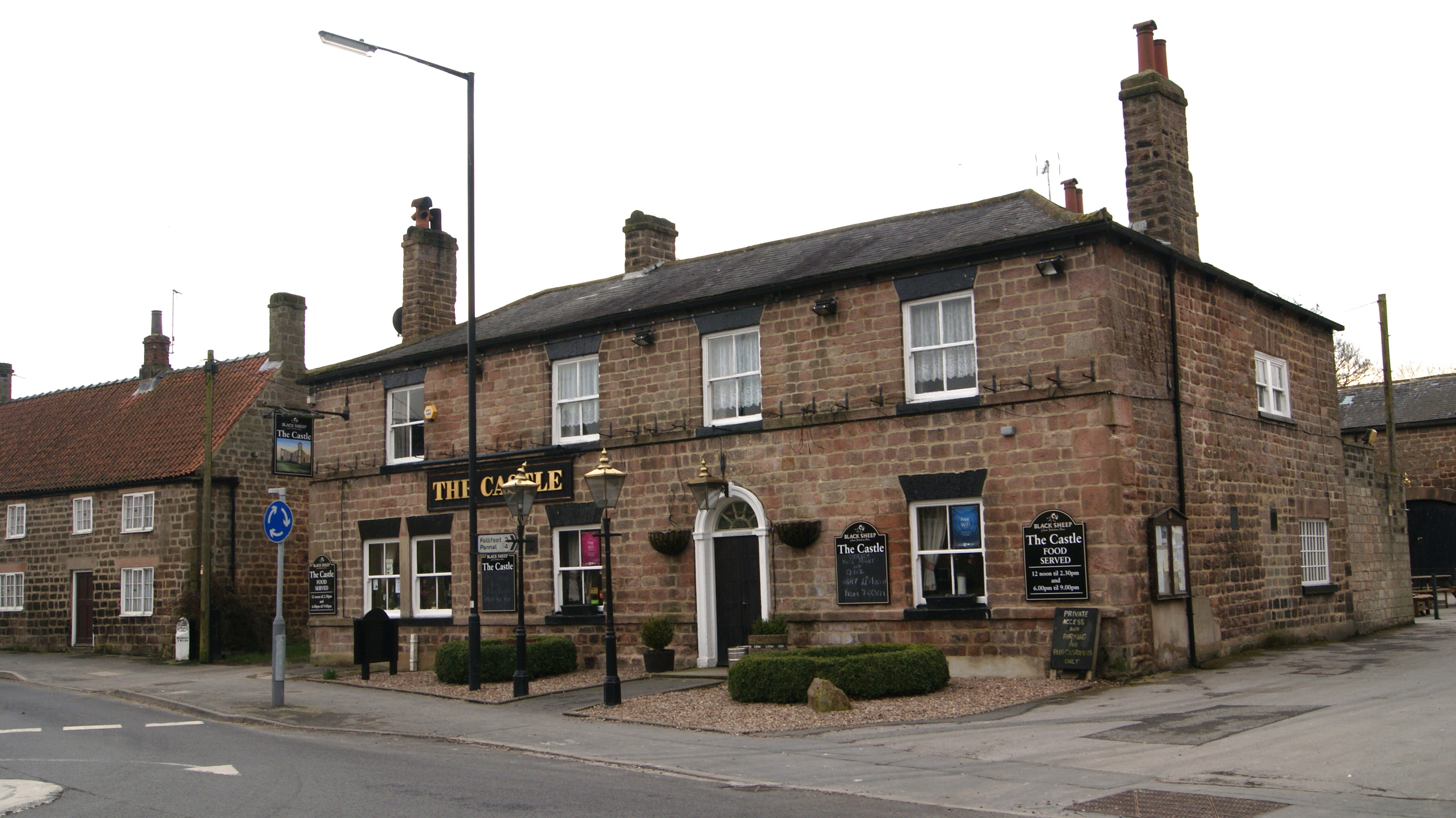
The Castle

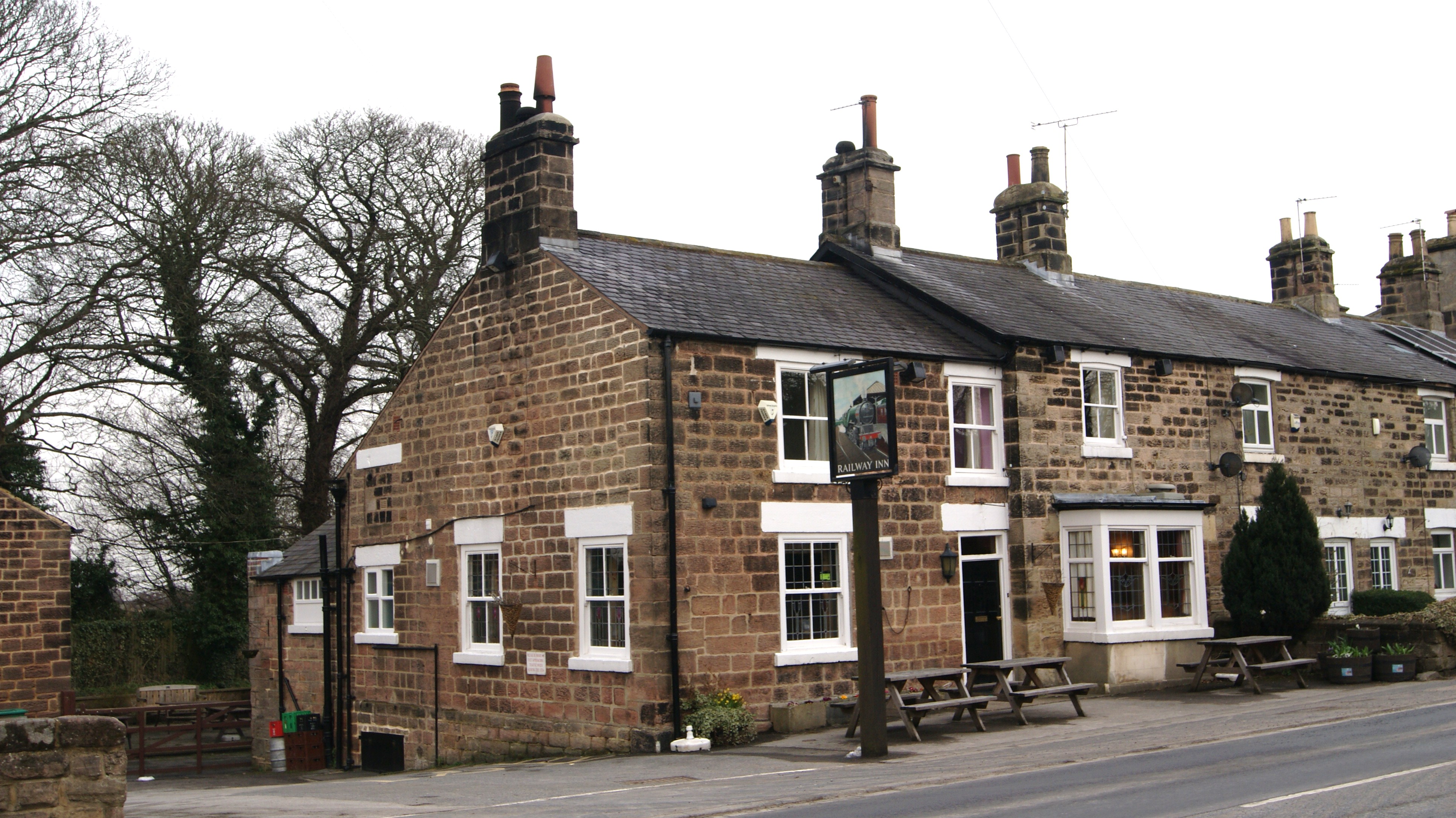
The Railway Inn

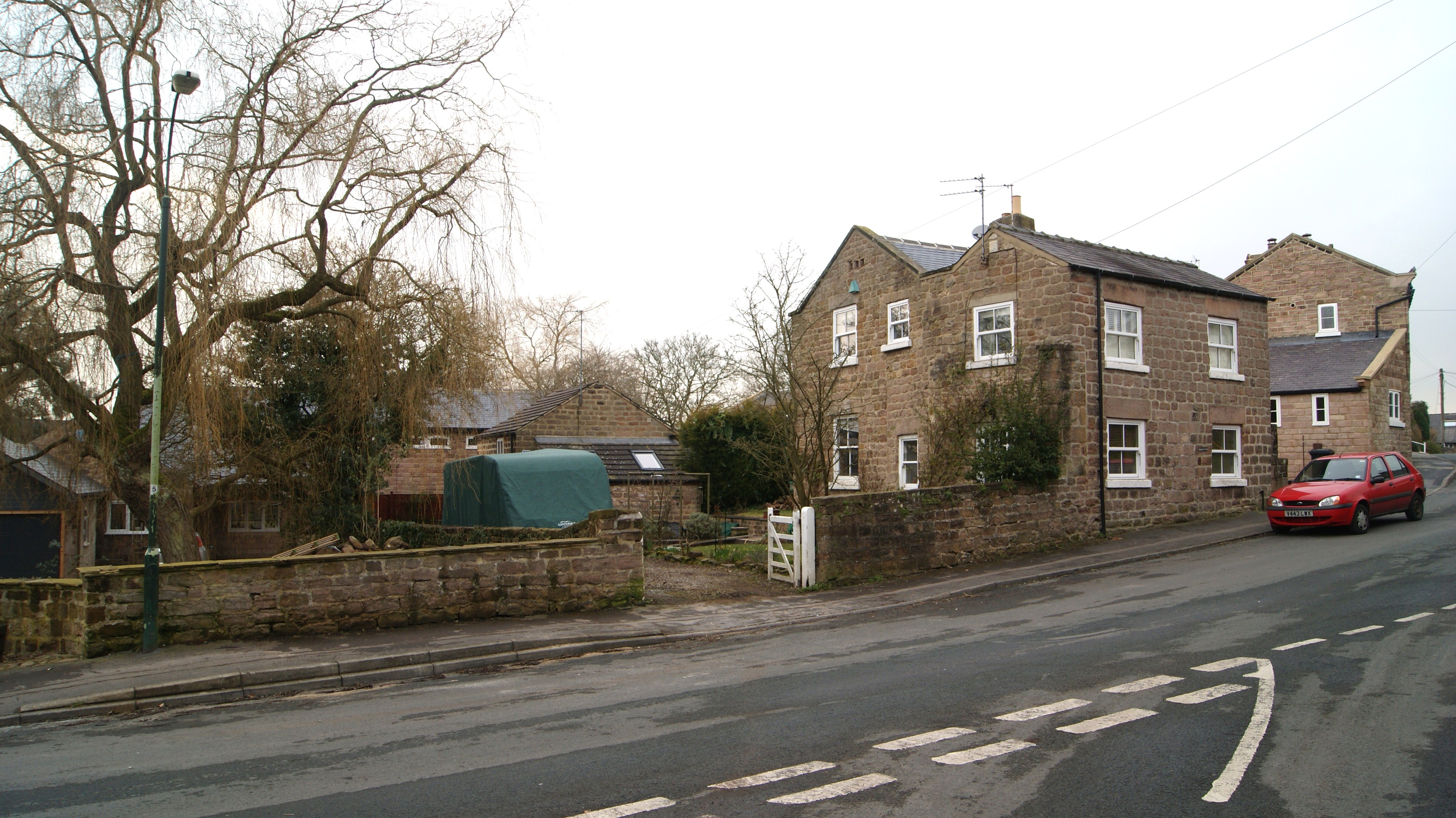
The former site of the King William IV on the extreme right hand side

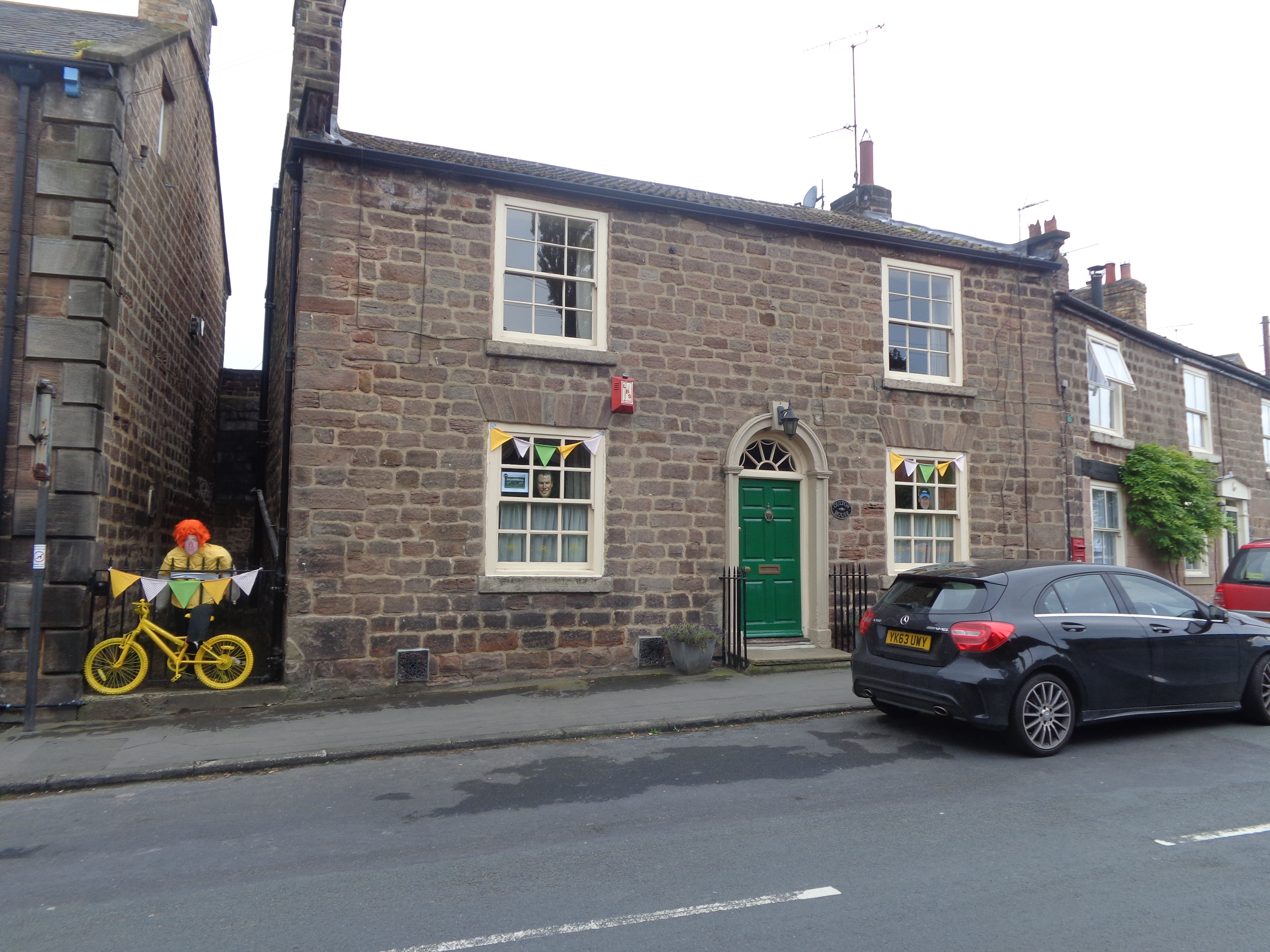
The former Prince of Wales, now a private residence, in Castle Street

== Transport ==
Spofforth is situated on the A661 Wetherby to Harrogate Road; a bypass has been proposed, but never developed. The village is served by two bus routes, No 7, operated by the Harrogate Bus Company, connects the village with Harrogate, Wetherby, Seacroft and Leeds and the X70, operated by Connexions Buses, links Harrogate, Follifoot and Wetherby.

After the closure of Spofforth railway station in 1964, the nearest National Rail stations are now at Harrogate and Knaresborough; Northern Trains operates regular services between Leeds and York.

The former railway trackbed is now part of the Harland Way shared-use path, which runs as far as Thorp Arch.

== Other landmarks ==
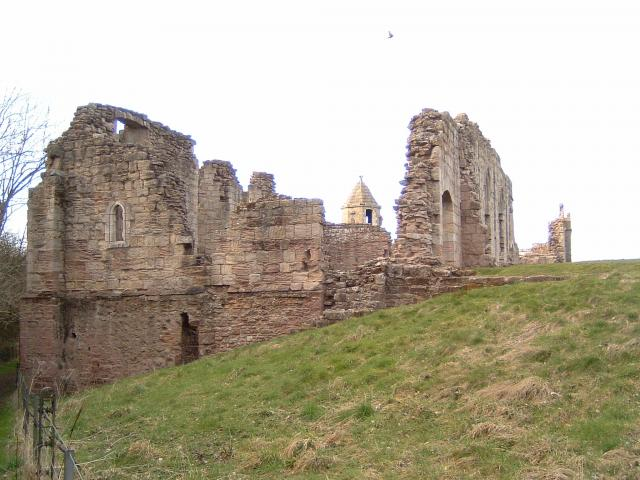
Spofforth Castle

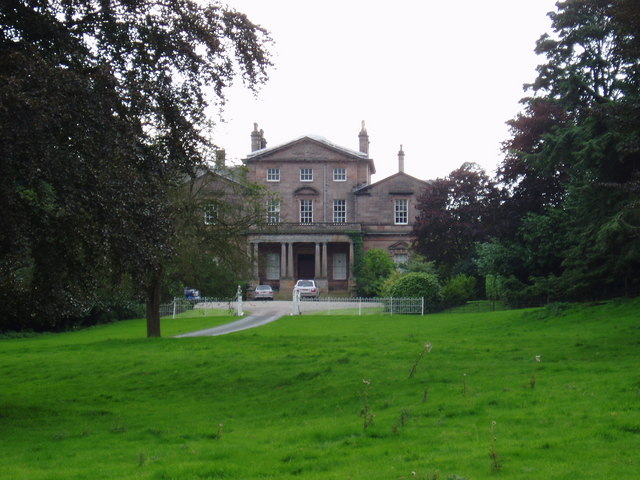
Stockeld Park

The ruins of Spofforth Castle, which date from the 13th century, are close to the centre of the village. Stockeld Park, south of the village near Sicklinghall, is a stone-built 18th-century Palladian villa.

== Notable people ==
- Andrew Brons, former National Front activist and British National Party MEP for Yorkshire and the Humber lives in the village.
- Laurence Eusden (1688–1730), who was made British Poet Laureate by George I in 1718, was baptised in Spofforth.
- Rev Dr William Osborne Greenwood MD FRSE (1873–1947) a curious blend of both minister and qualified surgeon.
- Blind Jack Metcalf (1717–1810), the road builder, lived in Spofforth in his later years and is buried in the village churchyard.
- Gerald Smithson (1926–1970), Yorkshire, Leicestershire and England cricketer, was born and grew up in Spofforth. His great-grandparents, Joseph and Rosina Smithsons, are buried in the village churchyard. His grandfather, George Robert Smithsons (1869–1955), played for Spofforth Cricket Club for over fifty years and his team photographs still hang in the current Spofforth cricket pavilion.

== See also ==
- Listed buildings in Spofforth with Stockeld
