= Crimple Beck =

River in North Yorkshire, England

Crimple Beck River Crimple
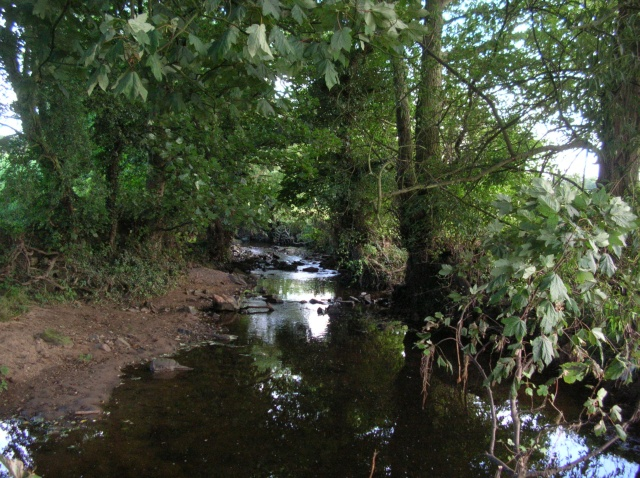
- Crimple near Pannal

- Location of the mouth within North Yorkshire

Location
- Country: England
- County: North Yorkshire

Physical characteristics
- Source
  - location: Stainburn Moor
- Mouth
  - location: River Nidd
  - coordinates: 53.972113°N 1.383731°W
- Length: 24.9 km (15.5 mi)
- Basin size: 80 km^{2} (31 sq mi)
- Discharge
  - location: Blackstones
  - average: 1.02 m^{3}/s (36 cu ft/s)

Crimple Beck or the River Crimple is a beck which flows through North Yorkshire, England. It is a tributary of the River Nidd which it joins between Little Ribston and Walshford north of Wetherby. The beck is 15.5 miles (24.9 km) long, and has a total catchment area of 80 square kilometres (31 sq mi), which drains the area around Harrogate. Its tributaries include the Park Beck.

== Course ==
The beck rises on the flanks of Stainburn Moor near Beckwithshaw and flows in an easterly direction to join the Nor Beck before passing through the villages of Burn Bridge and Pannal. It continues in a north-easterly direction, being bridged by the A61 and the Crimple Valley Viaduct just to the south of Harrogate. At the confluence with the Rud Brook it turns to the south-east, and meets the Park Brook before reaching Spofforth where it is bridged by the A661. Beyond Spofforth its course continues to Blackstones where it is measured, joining the River Nidd midway between Little Ribston and Walshford.

== Hydrology ==
The flow of the beck is measured by two gauging stations, the first near Burn Bridge in its upper reaches has operated since 1972, the second near to the confluence with the Nidd, at Blackstones since 1991.

The upper gauge at Burn Bridge, with a catchment of 8.1 square kilometres (3.1 sq mi) yields an average flow of 0.11 cubic metres per second (3.9 cu ft/s). The much larger catchment area of 76.8 square kilometres (29.7 sq mi) to the lower Blackstones gauge, recorded a correspondingly higher average flow of 1.02 cubic metres per second (36 cu ft/s).

The highest river level recorded at Blackstones occurred on the 26 December 2015, with a height of 2.98 metres (9 ft 9 in). The catchment upstream of the station has an average annual rainfall of 752 millimetres (29.6 in) and a maximum altitude of 243 metres (797 ft) on Stainburn Moor near the source of the beck.

Land use within the basin is mainly rural, consisting of grassland and arable with some woodland, and the urbanised area around Harrogate.

== See also ==
- List of rivers of Yorkshire
- List of rivers of England
- Crimplene – named after the valley
