= Wetherby Road =

Multi-purpose stadium in Harrogate, North Yorkshire, England

Marcy Fitness Stadium
- Wetherby Road
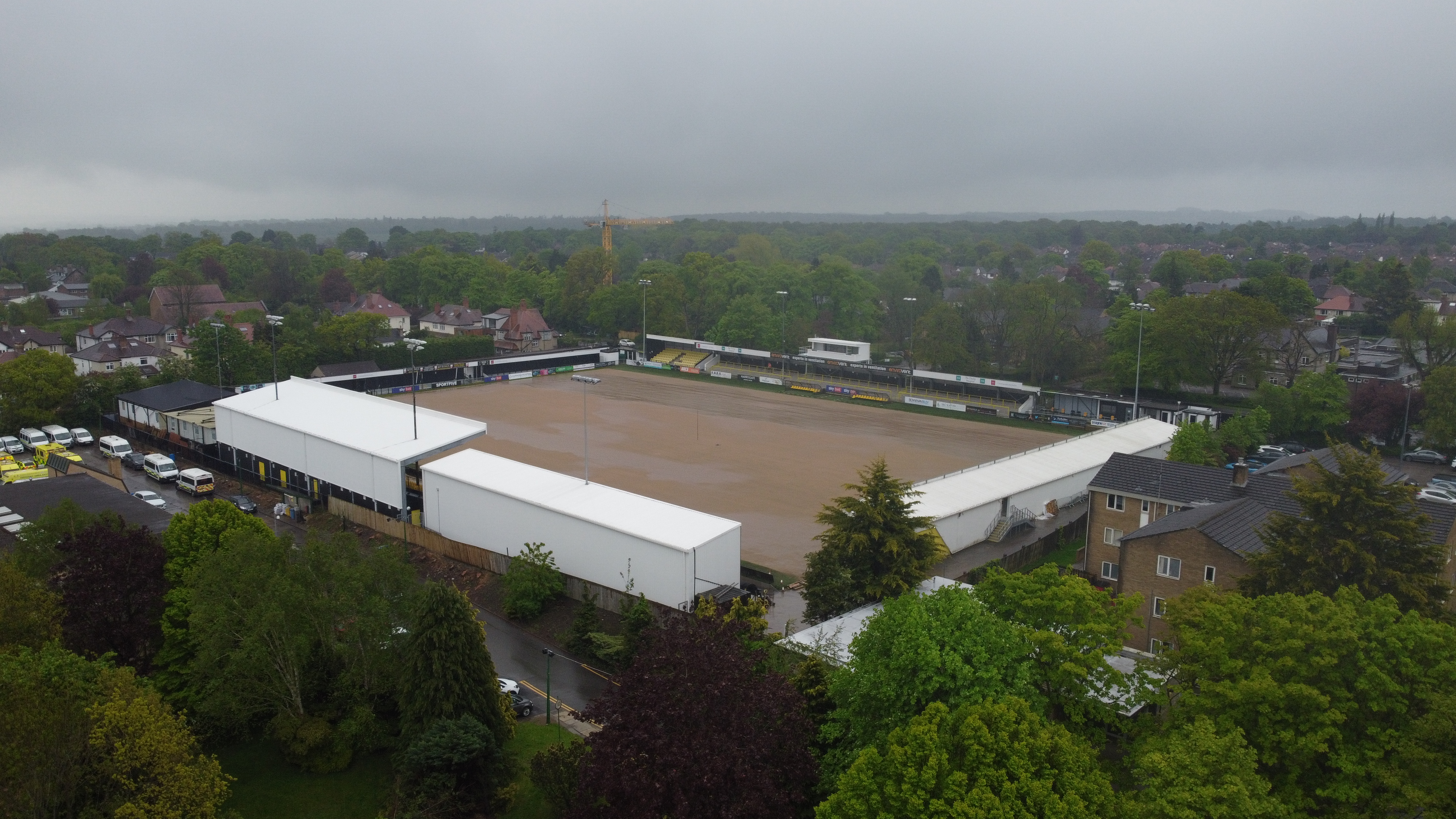
- Interactive map of Marcy Fitness Stadium
- Full name: The Marcy Fitness Stadium
- Former names: CNG Stadium, EnviroVent Stadium, Exercise Stadium
- Location: Wetherby Road; Woodlands; Harrogate; North Yorkshire; HG2 7SA
- Coordinates: 53°59′30″N 1°30′52″W
- Owner: Harrogate Town
- Operator: Harrogate Town
- Capacity: 5,000 (2,000 seated)
- Record attendance: 4,280 (Harrogate Town 0–3 Harrogate Railway, 1949–50 Whitworth Cup Final)

Construction
- Opened: 28 August 1920
- Renovated: 2014
- Expanded: 1990, 2014, 2020

Tenant
- Harrogate Town (1920–present)

Wetherby Road, known as the Marcy Fitness Stadium for sponsorship purposes, is a multi-purpose stadium in Harrogate, England. It is mostly used for football matches, being the home ground of Harrogate Town A.F.C. The stadium has a capacity of 5,000 people, and is situated on the north side of the A661 Wetherby Road, east of and adjacent to Harrogate District Hospital.

== History ==
While Harrogate Town formed in 1914, their original ground was on Starbeck Lane with the club later moving to Wetherby Road. The club constructed the Main Stand in 1990. Since June 2024, the ground has been sponsored by fitness equipment retailer Marcy Fitness, formerly known as Exercise.

The record crowd of 4,280 was at the 1949–1950 Whitworth Cup Final against Harrogate Railway, while the record league attendance was 3,000, at the 3–0 win over Brackley Town in the National League North playoff final in May 2018.

Due to English Football League regulations requiring natural turf, Harrogate played their first home games after their 2020 promotion at the Keepmoat Stadium in Doncaster. On 17 October, they returned to Wetherby Road and won 1–0 against Barrow in the first EFL game at the ground.

== Description ==
The pitch is aligned approximately northwest–southeast along the north side of the A661 Wetherby Road. Until 2014, there were no structures at the northern (hospital) end of the ground, but spectators could stand alongside the pitch. In 2014, a covered stand with standing facilities was added. The east side features two adjacent stands, both all-seated, and an executive suite. The south end (in 2023 being redeveloped) houses the clubhouse. The west side houses the turnstiles, a smaller all-seated stand with facilities for sponsors and the directors, and standing and seated areas for visiting supporters.

=== Gallery ===
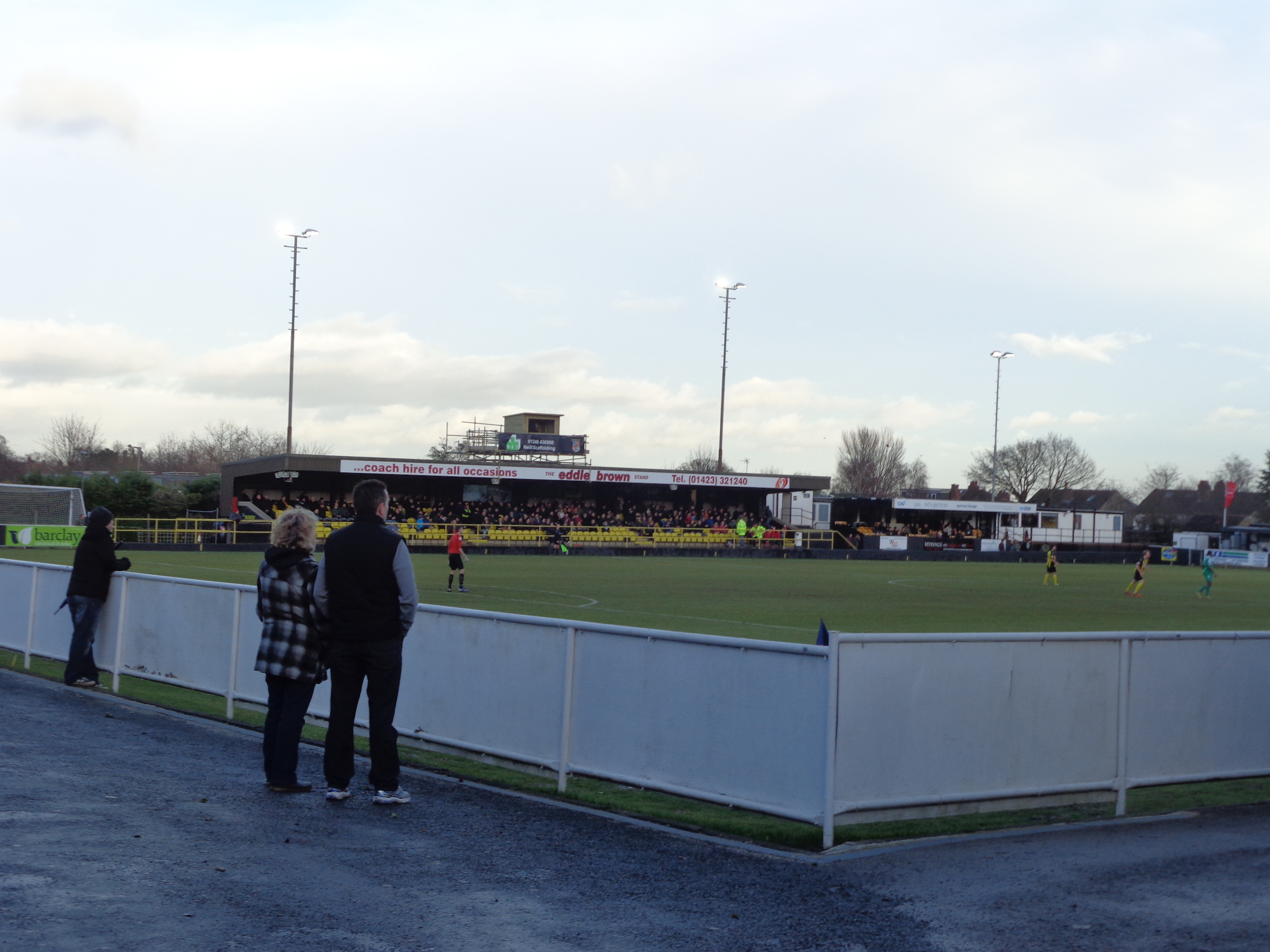
The ground in 2014 before remodelling, looking southwest

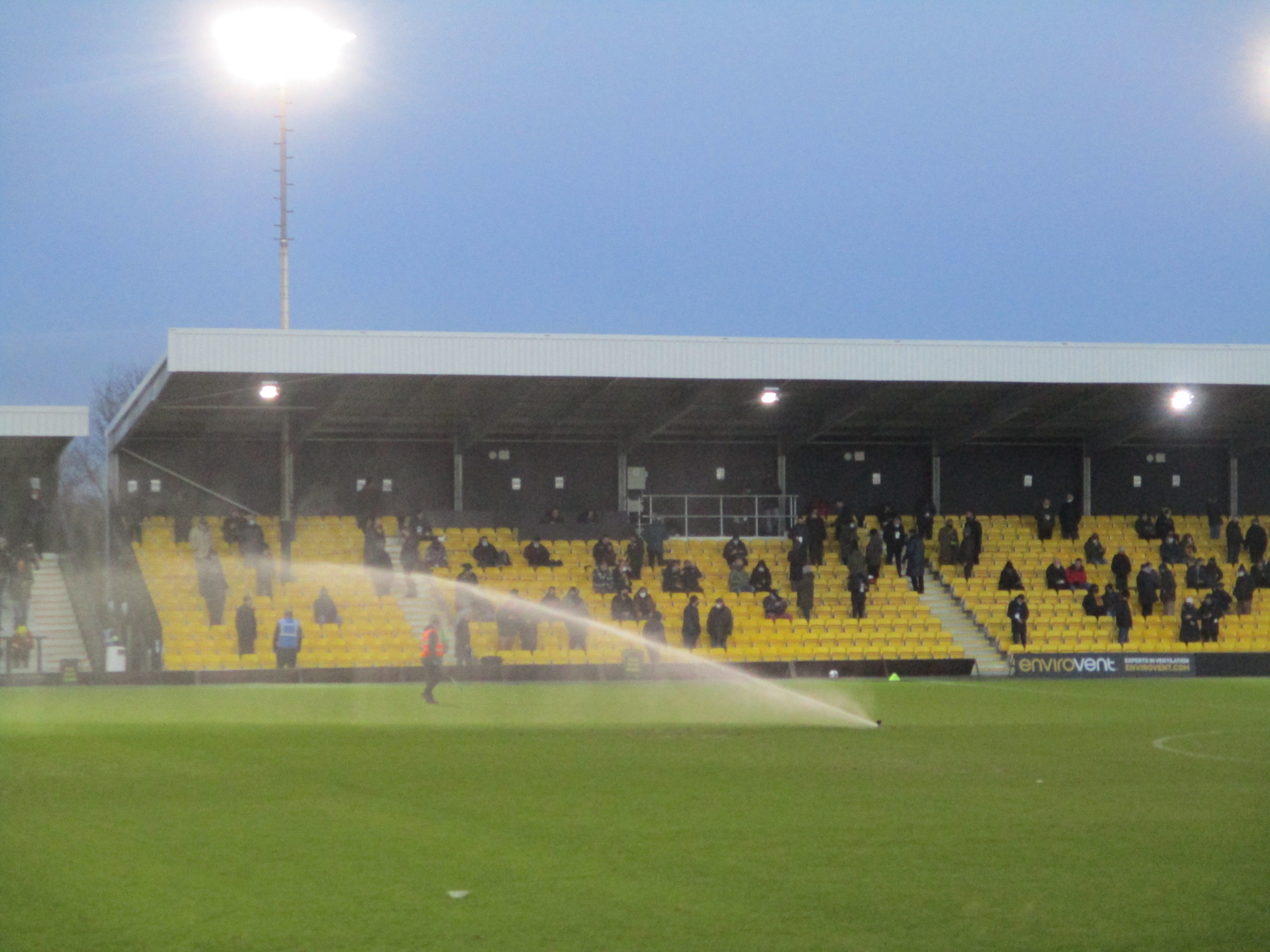
A socially distanced crowd in the East Stand in 2020

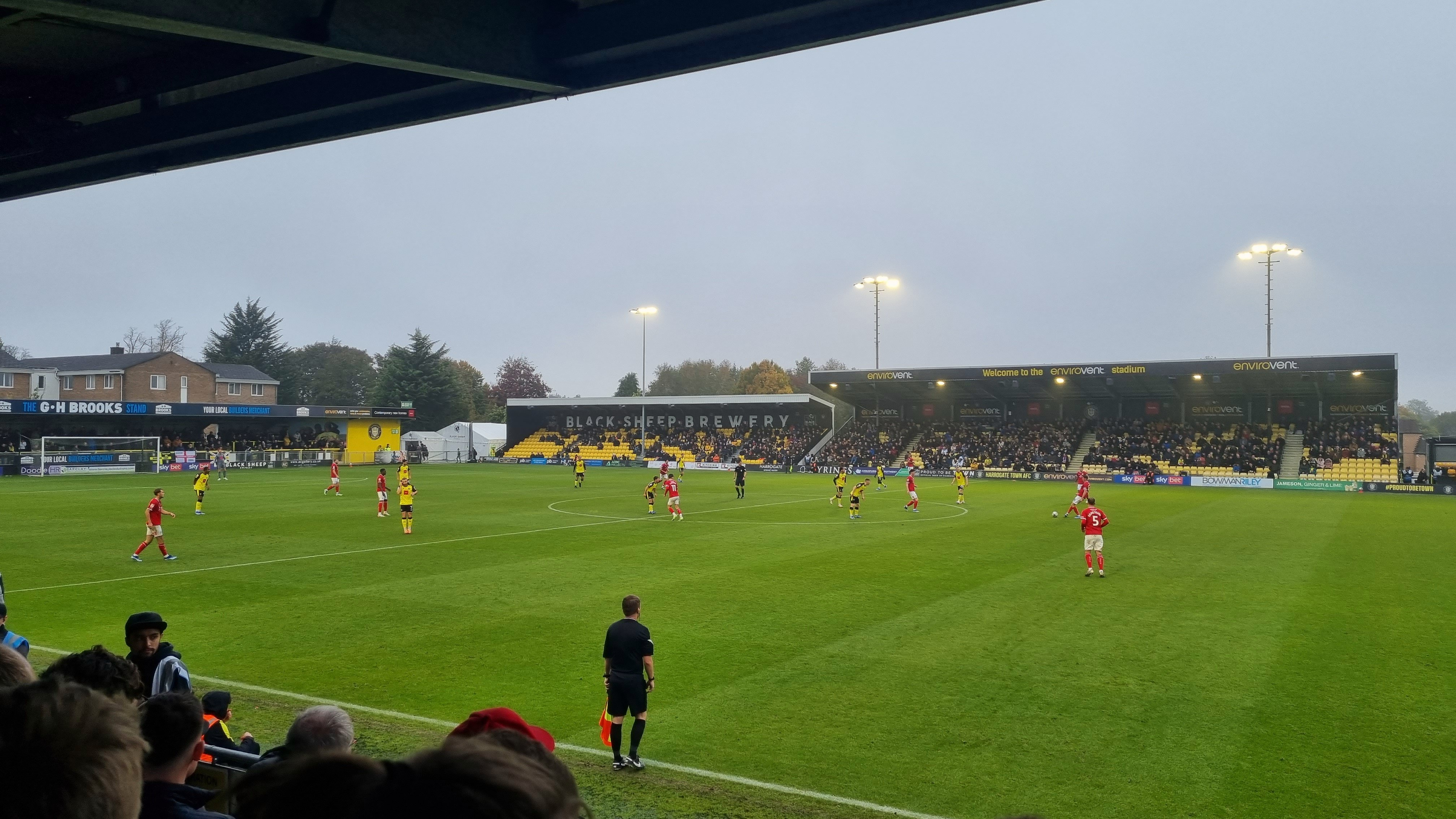
Northwards view of Wetherby Road, showing Hospital End (left) and two stands on eastern side

== Access ==
The nearest railway stations are Harrogate and Hornbeam Park, with services to Leeds and York, although both are around 20 minutes walk away. The stadium is served by the Harrogate Bus Company route 7 (previously 770), connecting the stadium with Harrogate bus station, Wetherby, Boston Spa, Seacroft and Leeds. There is a stop directly outside the stadium advertised for the football ground and hospital. According to the town's disc zone, parking in the area is restricted to two hours, being under disc zone 'H' (hospital).
