= Listed buildings in Little Ribston =

Little Ribston is a civil parish in the county of North Yorkshire, England. It contains four listed buildings that are recorded in the National Heritage List for England. All the listed buildings are designated at Grade II, the lowest of the three grades, which is applied to "buildings of national importance and special interest". The parish contains the village of Little Ribston and the surrounding area. One of the listed buildings is in the village, and is a house, and those outside the village consist of two bridges, one of them also with listed lodges and a gateway at its entrance.

== Buildings ==
Name and location	Photograph	Date	Notes
Holly Cottage; 53.97776°N 1.41237°W	—	Mid 18th century	The house is in pink gritstone, with quoins, and a pantile with an eaves course of stone slates, and a shaped kneeler and gable coping on the left. The central doorway and the windows, which are sashes, have moulded architraves and keystones.
Crimple Bridge; 53.97173°N 1.40572°W		Mid to late 18th century	The bridge carries Knaresborough Road (B6164 road) over Crimple Beck. It is in gritstone, and has been widened on the east side. The west side has two segmental arches, the left arch silted up. The cutwater is carried up as a pilaster to the slightly projecting parapet coping, and there are further pilasters. On the east side is a single main arch with voussoirs, a smaller dry arch, and pilasters. On the parapet is a metal plaque.
Gate piers, railings, and lodges at Ribston Lodge; 53.97695°N 1.40013°W		Mid to late 18th century	The west entrance to the bridge is flanked by square stone rusticated piers, each with a cornice, an entablature with a wreath in relief, and shallow pedimented copings surmounted by heraldic crests. Flanking these are wrought iron railings linking with square single-bay lodges with stone slate roofs. Each lodge has rusticated quoins, a modillion aves cornice, and a pedimented gable. The central doorway has an architrave, an entablature, and a cornice flanked by wreaths. The round-headed window is in a round-arched recess with a moulded arch, an impost band, and rusticated jambs.
Bridge over River Nidd at Ribston Lodge; 53.97702°N 1.39966°W		1855	The bridge carries a road over the River Nidd. It is in sandstone and gritstone, and consists of a round central arch flanked by smaller round arches. It has triangular cutwaters, and rock-faced voussoirs. The parapet has squared and chamfered balusters, and a central cast iron date plate. The parapet is pointed, and has pyramidal blocks over the central piers.
