= A661 =

A661 may refer to:

- A661 road, a road in England
- Bundesautobahn 661 or BAB 661, a German Autobahn
