= Bilton Grove Farm =

Farmhouse in North Yorkshire, England

Coordinates: 53°57′33″N 1°33′12″W

Bilton Grove Farm is a historic farm in Burn Bridge, a village in North Yorkshire, in England.

The farmhouse was built in 1662, and has since been extended. It was grade II* listed in 1949. In 2023, the property was marketed for sale for £850,000, at which time it had two reception rooms, three bedrooms, stables, a barn, further outbuildings, and 5.77 acres (2.34 ha) of paddocks.

The farmhouse is built of gritstone, and has a stone slate roof with kneelers and coved coping to the gables. There are two storeys and two bays. The doorway has a chamfered surround, and above it are inscribed initials and the date. All the windows have chamfered mullions.

== See also ==
- Grade II* listed buildings in North Yorkshire (district)
- Listed buildings in Pannal and Burn Bridge
