= Hill Top Hall =

Building in North Yorkshire, England

Coordinates: 53°57′35″N 1°33′33″W

Hill Top Hall is a historic building in Burn Bridge, a village in North Yorkshire, in England.

The building was constructed in the 17th century as a farmhouse. In 1908, a west wing was added, and it has since been further extended. It was grade II* listed in 1949. In 2018, it was marketed for sale for £3.25 million. At the time, it had a hall, dining room, drawing room, cloakroom, day room, kitchen, five bedrooms, and 10.4 acres (4.2 ha) of grounds.

The house is built of gritstone and has a stone slate roof, the gables with coved coping, and kneelers with finials. There are two storeys and attics, a west front of two bays, and a single-bay north wing. On the west wall is a projecting chimney stack with gargoyles. The doorway is in a splayed recess, and has a low pointed head, and a hood mould. On the ground floor are splayed bay windows, and the other windows have two lights with mullions and hood moulds. The doorway has its original oak boarded door, and the dining room has an early inglenook.

== See also ==
- Grade II* listed buildings in North Yorkshire (district)
- Listed buildings in Pannal and Burn Bridge
