= Listed buildings in Pannal and Burn Bridge =

Pannal and Burn Bridge is a civil parish in the county of North Yorkshire, England. It contains 11 listed buildings that are recorded in the National Heritage List for England. Of these, three are listed at Grade II*, the middle of the three grades, and the others are at Grade II, the lowest grade. The parish contains the villages of Pannal and Burn Bridge, and the surrounding countryside. The listed buildings consist of houses and cottages, farmhouses, a farmstead, a church and a boundary stone.

== Key ==
Grade	Criteria
II*	Particularly important buildings of more than special interest
II	Buildings of national importance and special interest

== Buildings ==
Name and location	Photograph	Date	Notes	Grade
St Robert's Church, Pannal; 53.96050°N 1.53482°W		14th century	The church has been altered and extended through the centuries. It is in sandstone with a slate roof, and consists of a nave, a lower and narrower chancel, and a west tower. Parish rooms have been added to the south side in the 20th century. The tower is in Perpendicular style, with three stages, and has diagonal buttresses, and a west doorway with segmental-pointed head. Above it is a three-light window, clock faces, two-light bell openings, and an embattled parapet. The north wall of the nave has quoins, and a blocked doorway with a rusticated surround.	II*
Hill Top Hall; 53.95980°N 1.55919°W	—	17th century	A west wing was added to the farmhouse in about 1908. The house is in gritstone and has a stone slate roof, the gables with coved coping, and kneelers with finials. There are two storeys and attics, a west front of two bays, and a single-bay north wing. On the west wall is a projecting chimney stack with gargoyles. The doorway is in a splayed recess, and has a low pointed head, and a hood mould. On the ground floor are splayed bay windows, and the other windows have two lights with mullions and hood moulds.	II*
Bilton Grove Farmhouse; 53.95929°N 1.55347°W	—	c. 1662	The farmhouse is in gritstone, and has a stone slate roof with kneelers and coved coping to the gables. There are two storeys and two bays. The doorway has a chamfered surround, and above it are inscribed initials and the date. All the windows have chamfered mullions.	II*
23 and 25 Main Street; 53.96070°N 1.53592°W		18th century	A pair of cottages in gritstone with slate roofs, the left roof with coped gables and kneelers. There are two storeys, and each cottage has two bays, the right cottage lower. The left cottage contains a doorway and sash windows, and on the right cottage are horizontally-sliding sash windows.	II
35 Main Street; 53.96096°N 1.53641°W	—	18th century	The cottage is in gritstone with quoins and a slate roof. There are two storeys and one bay, with a single-storey two-bay extension to the north, and an outshut on the west. The windows are sashes, some horizontally-sliding.	II
53 Main Street; 53.96135°N 1.53738°W	—	18th century	The cottage is in gritstone, with quoins, and a Welsh slate roof with coped gables and kneelers. There are two storeys and two bays, a two-storey single-bay extension to the west and a modern rear extension. The doorway is recessed, the ground floor windows are mullioned, and elsewhere there is a mix of sash and casement windows.	II
Boundary stone 53.95794°N 1.53897°W		1767	The boundary stone marking a boundary of the Forest of Knaresborough is a square column about 2 feet (0.61 m) in height with an arched top. It is inscribed with "KF" and the date.	II
Dawcross Farmhouse; 53.95990°N 1.55032°W	—	Late 18th century	The farmhouse is in gritstone, with sill bands, an eaves course forming a gutter, and a stone slate roof. There are two storeys and three bays. The central doorway has an architrave, a semi-elliptical radial fanlight, a panelled frieze and a cornice, and the windows are recessed with sashes.	II
Spacey Houses Farm; 53.95665°N 1.53111°W		Late 18th century	The farmstead consists of a farmhouse and attached cottage, and various farm buildings. They are in limestone, and most have slate roofs. The farmhouse has two storeys and three bays. In the centre is a doorway with a rectangular fanlight, above it is a sash window, and it is flanked by two-storey caned bay windows. The cottage to the north has two bays, and most of its windows are sashes. The farm buildings include stables, loose boxes, a cow house, sheds, a threshing barn, a granary and a horse engine shed.	II
12 Main Street; 53.96022°N 1.53529°W	—	Early 19th century	Two cottages combined into one house, in gritstone with a slate roof. There are two storeys and four bays. On the ground floor are sash windows, the right bay contains a large entrance, and the upper floor has slightly recessed horizontally-sliding sashes and shutters.	II
14 Main Street; 53.96031°N 1.53539°W	—	Early 19th century	The house is in gritstone, with quoins, and a slate roof with coped gables and kneelers. There are two storeys and three bays. The central doorway has a fanlight, the windows are sashes, and all the openings have architraves, and grooved heads to imitate voussoirs.	II
