= John Cass Birkinshaw =

British railway engineer (1811–1867)

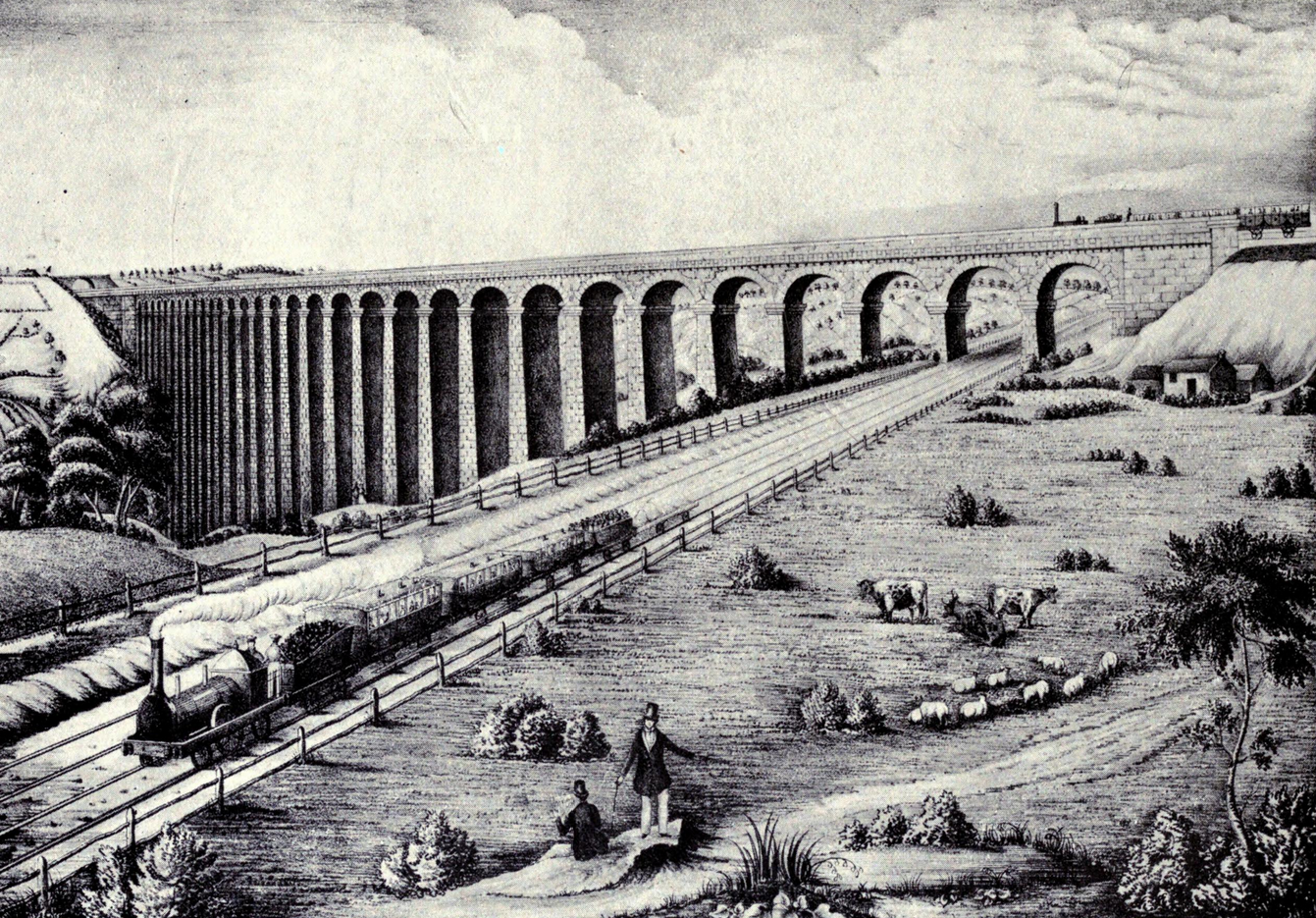
The Crimple Valley Viaduct of 1847-49

John Cass Birkinshaw (1811-1861) MICE was a railway engineer in Britain.

== Life ==
He was born on 14 November 1811 in Bedlington, Northumberland to John Birkinshaw and Ann Cass. He was baptised on 19 January 1812.

He married Frances Thackwray on 9 April 1846 in St Robert's Church, Pannal, Yorkshire and they had the following children.

- John F Birkinshaw (b. 1848)
- Fanny M Birkinshaw (b. 1849)
- Aini L Birkinshaw (b. 1850)
- Eleanor Birkinshaw (b. 1856)

He died on 2 March 1867.

== Career ==
His father was principal agent of the Bedlington Ironworks who developed and patented malleable iron fish-bellied rail, and worked with George Stephenson. One of John Cass Birkinshaw’s early works in 1826-27 was a suspension bridge erected over the river Wansbeck in Morpeth. (Sadly this bridge collapsed in 1871 by the activities of revellers at the annual festival of brass bands who jumped on the bridge en masse to make it shake. )

In 1827 when Robert Stephenson returned from South America, John Cass found himself his first articled pupil, working at the Robert Stephenson and Company Forth Street engine factory.

He was assistant engineer for the Leicester and Swannington Railway in 1830 working under Joshua Richardson, resident engineer and Robert Stephenson, superintending engineer.

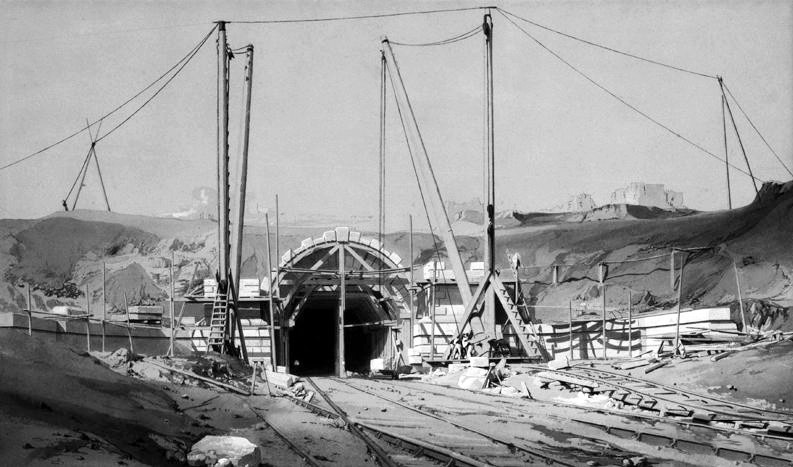
Primrose Hill Tunnel under construction in April 1837, a watercolour engraving by John Cooke Bourne

From 1834 he was assistant engineer of the London and Birmingham Railway with responsibility for the London and Camden Town end, taking over the construction of the Primrose Hill Tunnel. the open-cut tunnel at Kensal Green and the Brent bridge.

He was resident engineer of the Birmingham and Derby Junction Railway from 1838 to 1842. He also supervised construction of carriages and rolling stock at Tamworth until this work was taken over by Matthew Kirtley.

From 1844 he was joint engineer with Robert Stephenson of the York and North Midland Railway and he was the engineer responsible for the construction of the from York to Scarborough. This 42 miles (68 km) line originally of single track, opened on 7 July 1845. Shortly afterwards he completed surveys for the Seamer and Bridlington line and the Hull and Bridlington line. When formed, these provided a continuous route from Scarborough via Bridlington to Hull.

In 1845 he was engineer for the York and North Midland Railway with their project to construct 18 miles of railway from Church Fenton to Harrogate, including the 31 arch 1,872 feet (571 m) Crimple Valley Viaduct which was built between 1847 and 1849. The Pickering branch of the York and Scarborough line was constructed to connect with the Whitby and Pickering railway.

From 1846 to 1853 he was engineer for the Malton and Driffield Junction Railway and other schemes including the Thirsk and Malton railway, the Knottingley branch railway and the Selby and Market Weighton railway.

In 1847 he was elected a Member of the Institution of Civil Engineers.

He relocated to London where he planned the Ware and Hertford railway, the Luton and Hertford, the Lymington branch of the South Western Railway, and the Sittingbourne and Sheerness railway.

For a while he was in partnership with Henry Conybeare, but this partnership was dissolved in 1859.

In 1860 he devised a scheme to reclaim 25,000 acres of land in Jutland for the Danish Land Company.

In 1863 he travelled to Italy to survey a route for the Turin–Fossano–Savona railway.
