= Crimple Valley =

Valley in North Yorkshire, England

Coordinates: 53.97232°N 1.51525°W

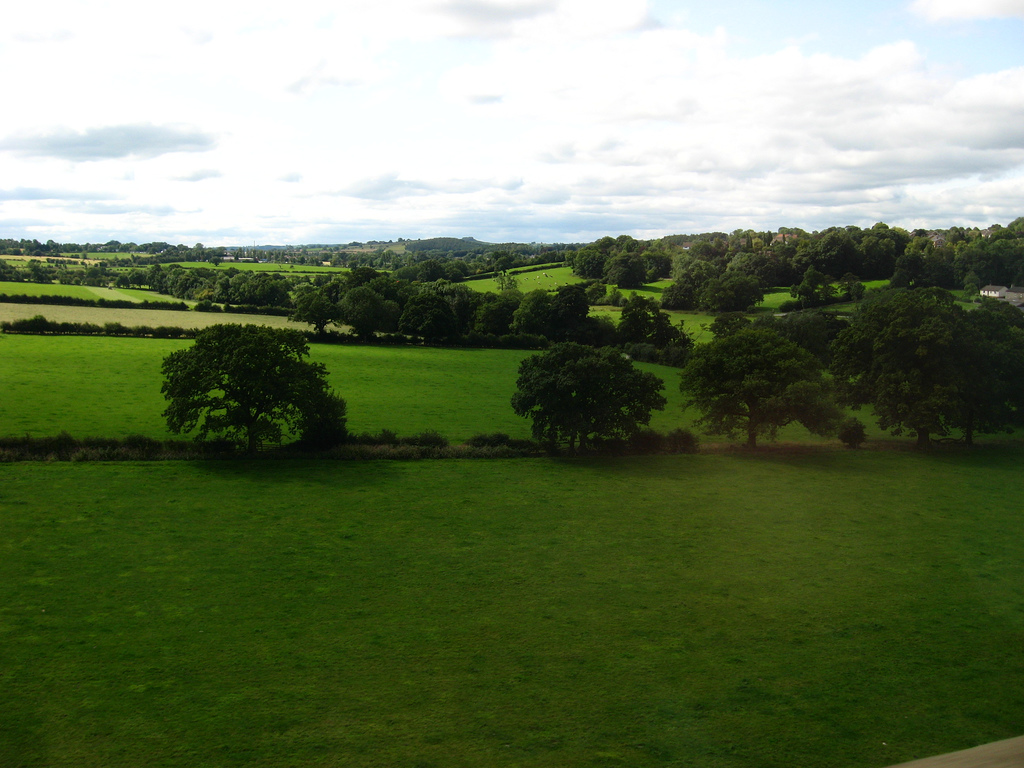
The valley seen from the viaduct

Crimple Valley is an area south of Harrogate (North Yorkshire) surrounding the River Crimple (also known as Crimple Beck). It gave its name to the synthetic yarn Crimplene, which was developed at the nearby ICI Laboratory.

It is crossed by the Crimple Valley Viaduct.
