= Bilton Court =

Historic building in Harrogate, England

Coordinates: 53°59′02″N 1°29′33″W

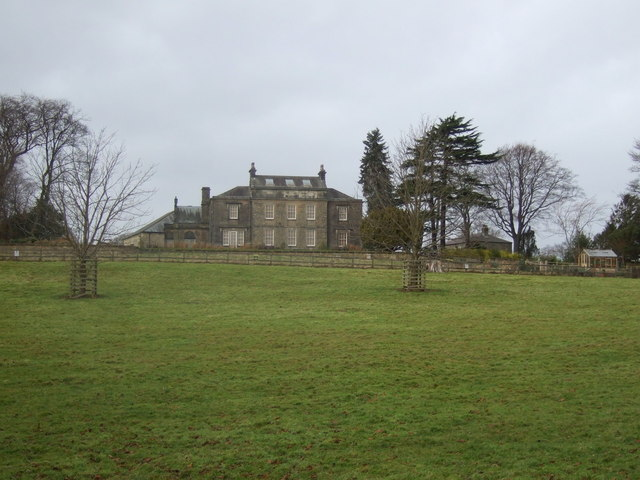
The building, in 2013

Bilton Court is a historic building in Harrogate, a town in North Yorkshire, in England.

The house was built in about 1740. East and west wings were added in 1820, and in 1889 a chapel was added at the rear of the west wing. In the late 20th century, the house was converted into offices, but in 2023 plans were approved to convert it back into a house, with an extension providing a garage and garden room. The building has been grade II listed since 1975.

The house is built of gritstone with a moulded eaves cornice, a panelled parapet and a slate roof. There are two storeys and cellars, three bays, and slightly recessed lower two-storey flanking bays, with hipped roofs and console bracketed cornices. The entrance in the east wing has a Tuscan doorcase, and an arched doorway with a fanlight. The windows are slightly recessed sashes, and in the west wing is a French window. The chapel was later converted into a billiard room, and has wooden panelling and a hammerbeam roof.

The house has a coach house and stable block, built in about 1850. It is built of rusticated gritstone, with a floor band, and a hipped slate roof with a central pedimented pigeon loft. There is a central block with two storeys and three bays, and single-storey single-bay wings. In the centre is a round-arched doorway with a fanlight and a keystone, and the windows are recessed horizontally-sliding sashes with segmental heads. It is also grade II listed.

== See also ==
- Listed buildings in Harrogate (Hookstone Ward)
