= Crimple Valley Viaduct =

Railway viaduct in North Yorkshire, England

Coordinates: 53°58′22.79″N 1°31′0.07″W

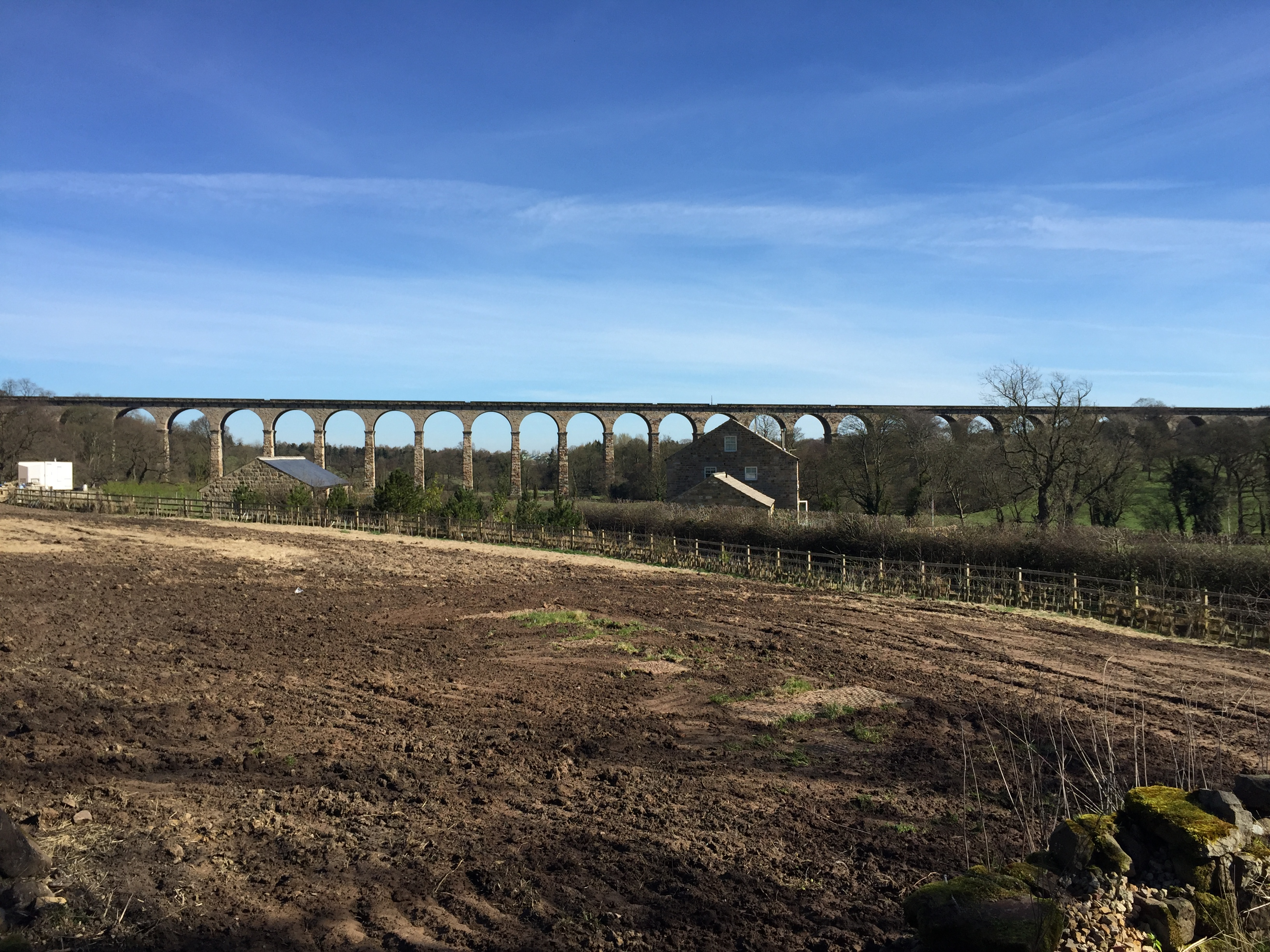
- Crimple Viaduct
- Carries: Harrogate Line
- Crosses: Crimple Valley
- Locale: North Yorkshire
- Official name: Crimple Valley Viaduct
- Maintained by: Network Rail
- Heritage status: Grade II* listed
- ELR no.: LEH 3

Characteristics
- Total length: 1,872 feet (571 m)
- Height: 110 feet (34 m)

History
- Construction start: 3 March 1847
- Opened: 1848

Location
- Interactive map of Crimple Valley Viaduct

Crimple Valley Viaduct, also known as Crimple Viaduct and Crimple Beck Viaduct, is a railway viaduct which crosses the Crimple Valley between Pannal railway station and Hornbeam Park railway station in North Yorkshire. It is a Grade II* listed structure.

== History ==
The viaduct was built for the Harrogate–Church Fenton line (then part of the York & North Midland Railway) and crosses Crimple Beck, and also the Leeds Northern Railway which opened in 1849. The Leeds Northern Railway line went underneath the eastern side of the viaduct through the second arch inwards, and then soon after crossed a ten-arch viaduct referred to as Crimple Low Viaduct to differentiate between the two. In 1854, the North Eastern Railway was formed, which amalgamated several railway companies, including the Leeds Northern and the Y&NMR, and so in 1862, a new connection was built between the Leeds & Thirsk and the Church Fenton Line, with a rising gradient line which connected the two lines at the extreme eastern end of the viaduct at Crimple Junction.

It is 1,872 feet (571 m) long and has 31 arches, each of 52-foot (16 m) span, which reach a maximum height of 110 feet (34 m) above the Crimple Valley. The viaduct is also built on a rising gradient of 1-in-91, which levels off on the approach into Harrogate itself. The sharp bend in the track on the south side of the viaduct causes trains to reduce speed significantly. Older Pacer rolling stock units are locally known to loudly squeal whilst passing around the tight bend due to increased pressure on the bogies and wheels.

It was completed in 1848 for the York and North Midland Railway company, and opened for traffic in July of that year. It is built of brick, and rusticated grit stone ashlar. The viaduct was designed by John Cass Birkinshaw and was built by James Hartley, mason. The stone was obtained from Brown Hill in Plompton.

The section of the Leeds Northern Railway between Pannal and Starbeck which went under the viaduct was closed in June 1951. Crimple Viaduct is part of the Harrogate line which has traffic running between Leeds and York via Harrogate and Knaresborough. The track is designated as up towards Leeds (the northernmost line on the viaduct), whilst towards Harrogate is the down line. Network Rail designate the bridge as number LEH3; the LEH stands for Leeds and Harrogate line.

== See also ==
- Grade II* listed buildings in North Yorkshire (district)
- Listed buildings in Harrogate (Hookstone Ward)
- Arthington Viaduct
- Kirkstall Viaduct
- Knaresborough Viaduct
- Nidd Viaduct
