= John Birkinshaw =

19th-century British civil engineer

John Birkinshaw (1777–1842) was an English railway engineer from Bedlington, Northumberland, noted for his invention of wrought iron rails in 1820 (patented on 23 October 1820).

Up to this point, rail systems had used either wooden rails, which were totally incapable of supporting steam engines, or cast iron rails typically only 3 ft (0.91 m) in length. These cast iron rails, developed by William Jessop and others, only allowed very low speeds and broke easily and although steam locomotives had been tested as early as 1804 by Richard Trevithick, these experiments had not been economically successful as the rails frequently broke.

"John Birkinshaw's 1820 patent for rolling wrought-iron rails in 15ft lengths was a vital breakthrough for the infant railway system. Wrought iron was able to withstand the moving load of a locomotive and train unlike cast iron, used for rails until then, which was brittle and fractured all too easily."

Birkinshaw's wrought iron rails were taken up by George Stephenson in 1821 for the proposed Stockton and Darlington Railway, despite the fact that Stephenson already held the rights to the best cast iron product, and it was this railway that effectively launched the rail era.

== Career ==
- In 1821, whilst an engineer at Bedlington Ironworks, Birkinshaw developed a new method of rolling wrought iron rails in 15 ft (4.6 m) lengths.
- His son John Cass Birkinshaw (1811–1867) worked for Robert Stephenson as an assistant engineer on the London & Birmingham Railway (L&BR), then resident engineer on the Birmingham and Derby Junction Railway, and was engineer-in-chief for the Malton and Driffield Railway (MDR).

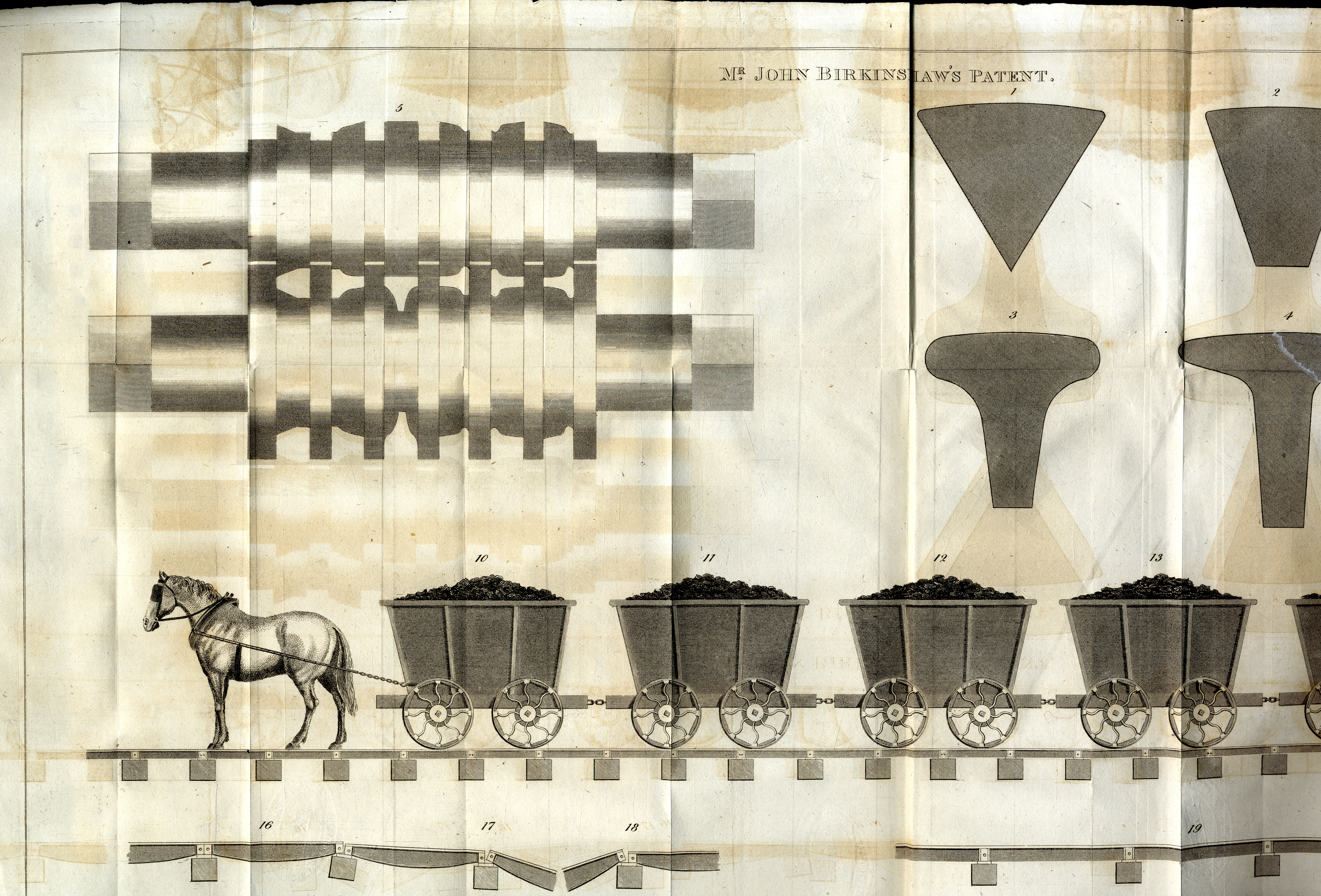
John Birkenshaw's patent for Malleable Iron Rails Plate 2

== Private life ==
Birkinshaw married at St John's, Newcastle upon Tyne on 10 October 1809. He and his wife Ann Cas had eight children:

- John Cass Birkinshaw (1811–1867)
- Henry Birkinshaw (born 1817)
- George Peter Birkenshaw (born 1820)
- William Birkinshaw (born 1822)
- Emma A. (born 1824)
- Edward Birkinshaw (born 1826)
- Richard (born 1829)
- Mary (born 1834)

== See also ==
- Permanent way (history)
- Rail transport
