= Pannal railway station =

Railway station in North Yorkshire, England

Pannal
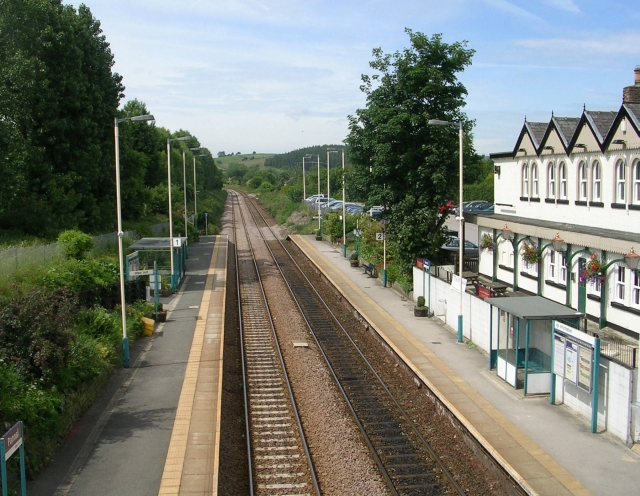

General information
- Location: Pannal, North Yorkshire; England
- Coordinates: 53.9585°N 1.5327°W
- Grid reference: SE307514
- Managed by: Northern Trains
- Transit authority: West Yorkshire (Metro)
- Platforms: 2

Other information
- Station code: PNL
- Fare zone: 6
- Classification: DfT category F1

History
- Opened: 1848

Passengers
- 2020/21: ▼31,474
- 2021/22: ▲94,800
- 2022/23: ▲0.122 million
- 2023/24: ▲0.151 million
- 2024/25: ▲0.192 million
Location
Notes
- Passenger statistics from the Office of Rail and Road

Pannal railway station serves the villages of Pannal and Spacey Houses in the southern suburbs of Harrogate, in North Yorkshire, England; it lies equidistant from both. It also serves the village of Burn Bridge, on the opposite side of Pannal. The station is located on the Harrogate Line, 15 miles (24 km) north of Leeds, and is managed by Northern Trains which operates all passenger services.

== History ==
The station was built by contractors, James Bray, who had been appointed by the Leeds & Thirsk Railway on 26 April 1846 to build the section between Weeton and Starbeck. It was opened on 13 September 1848, when the section of line between Weeton and Ripon commenced operation from Starbeck only as a single line until at least February 1849; the other line was used to convey contractors' materials for building the line south of Weeton and services throughout to Leeds commenced on 9 July 1849.

The Leeds & Thirsk Railway changed its name to the Leeds Northern Railway in August 1851. On 31 July 1854, the Leeds Northern Railway amalgamated with the York, Newcastle & Berwick Railway and the York & North Midland Railway becoming the North Eastern Railway.

Trains began running directly to Harrogate on 1 August 1862, when the North Eastern Railway completed a short line (the Pannal Loop) from Pannal Junction to Crimple Junction. This undertook a very tight curve to take trains over the Crimple Valley Viaduct and into the new central Harrogate station, which was built to replace Brunswick station. Once built, Pannal Junction had its own separate signalbox.

On 1 January 1923, the railways were grouped and it became the London & North Eastern Railway. The signalbox at Pannal Junction was closed in 1927; the points and signals at this location were operated from the signalbox at Pannal station.

On 1 January 1948, under the Transport Act, the railways were nationalised becoming British Railways. The original line between Pannal Junction and Starbeck was closed on 7 October 1951, leaving the later Pannal Loop as the only line north of Pannal.

Goods traffic was withdrawn from Pannal in 1954, but the sidings remained until the closure of the signalbox and removal of the signals in 1969, when they were all lifted. The station was staffed until 15 June 1969, when it became an unstaffed halt with no facilities other than basic small shelters provided for passengers. Tickets had to be obtained from the guard on the train. In 2011, an automated ticket machine accepting only debit and credit cards was installed in the waiting shelter on the up (Leeds) platform.

In 2012, Network Rail commenced resignalling of the line between Armley Junction and Harrogate; this led to the signalling being commissioned and all coming under the control of the Harrogate signalbox during the period of 27–29 October 2012. A trench was dug along the up platform for a cabling duct and access manholes to be installed to carry the signalling cables. Shorter block sections to allow for greater line capacity were installed and, for the first time since the rationalisation of 1969 ironically with longer block sections, signals can once again be seen from the station.

=== Layout ===
The station buildings were located on the down platform and there was a timber waiting shelter, with a store, on the up platform. There was a signal box, of standard North Eastern Railway design, located at the south end of the down platform. The station had a cattle dock siding, adjacent to the up line, at the south end of the up platform, opposite the signalbox, with a ramp up to the road from this siding.

The cattle, often from Ireland, used to be driven up the ramp onto the road; the very short distance up Station Road to the former Auction Mart that was located in Spacey Houses on the opposite corner of the junction of Princess Royal Way (A61) and Follifoot Road. The goods yard had three lines of sidings accessed from a headshunt on the side of the down line. This included a coal depot on two of the sidings furthest away from the station and a small warehouse on the other siding nearest the station buildings.

== Facilities ==
There are two platforms: the up line (platform 1) to Leeds and the down line (platform 2) to Harrogate. Digital information screens and bus-type waiting shelters are in place on each platform; an automated public address system is also installed to offer train running information. Both platforms have access ramps from the main road for use by disabled passengers.

The former station buildings have been extensively extended and were converted into a public house in the early 1980s. It was first named Platform One, despite this being located on what is actually now platform 2; after another extensive renovation, it was renamed The Harwood. In 2014, it was converted into a Co-op Food shop.

When first converted as Platform One, a Pullman kitchen second class parlour carriage, built in 1960 as number 332, formerly on the North Yorkshire Moors Railway, was incorporated into the public house as a dining room. This carriage was renamed Mae, after the mother of the first landlord Paul Eckart, but was removed and scrapped by Booths of Rotherham when the public house underwent the second renovation, due to it containing extensive blue asbestos insulation.

The former goods yard on the down side is now an extensive car park for the station and the shop. The ramp from the former cattle dock on the up side can still be seen, as a strip of inclined unused land between the station and the former Dunlopillo factory, which was closed in 2008. This ramp was cleared of undergrowth in 2009, in order to allow vehicular access for track maintenance and, again, in 2012 to allow access for the resignalling scheme.

== Services ==
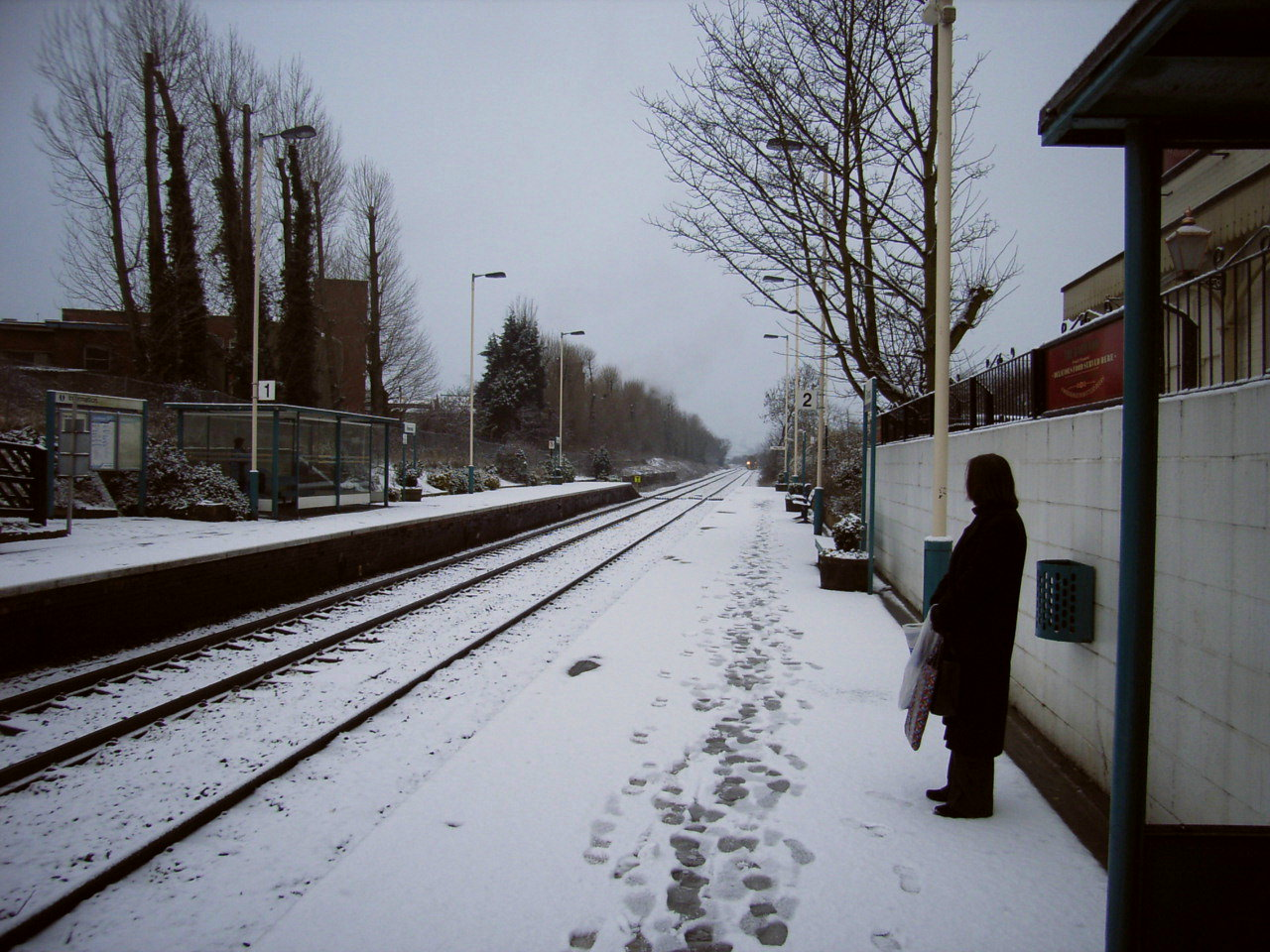
The station in the snow

Services on the Harrogate Line are operated by Northern Trains. During Monday to Saturday daytimes, and also on Sundays from mid-morning, there is generally a half-hourly service in both directions between Leeds, Harrogate, Knaresborough and York. In the evenings, there is generally an hourly service in each direction.

Preceding station	National Rail	Following station
Weeton	Northern; Harrogate Line	Hornbeam Park
