= Little Ribston =

Village and civil parish in North Yorkshire, England

Coordinates: 53.975°N 1.413°W

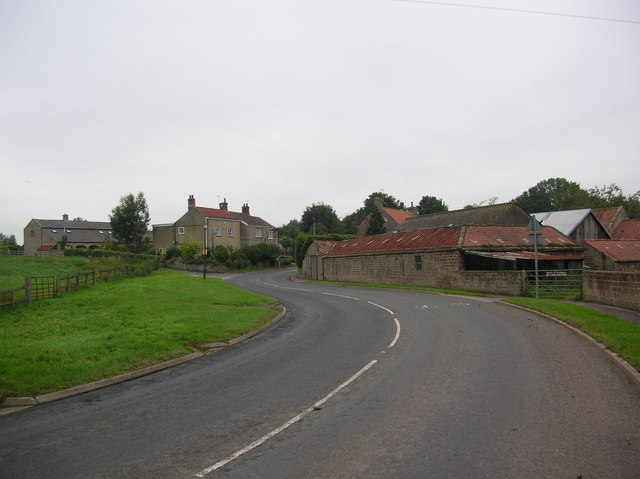
- Outskirts of the Village

- Location within North Yorkshire
- Population: 272 (Including North Deighton. 2011 census)
- OS grid reference: SE3853
- Unitary authority: North Yorkshire
- Ceremonial county: North Yorkshire
- Region: Yorkshire and the Humber
- Country: England
- Sovereign state: United Kingdom
- Post town: Wetherby
- Postcode district: LS22
- Police: North Yorkshire
- Fire: North Yorkshire
- Ambulance: Yorkshire

Little Ribston is a village and civil parish in the county of North Yorkshire, England. Little Ribston is located on the River Nidd, 4 miles (6.4 km) north of Wetherby and 3 miles (4.8 km) south-east of Knaresborough. The Ribston Pippin apple originated here when Sir Henry Goodricke planted the first seed brought from Normandy in the 18th century and a stump of a later tree is still preserved in Ribston park. There were several inns or licensed premises in the village in previous times, though none remain today. The nearest pub to Little Ribston is The Bay Horse in Kirk Deighton. Little Ribston has two cricket teams in the Nidderdale league and Harrogate evening league. They are based in Ribston Park, Little Ribston, halfway between Knaresborough and Wetherby.

== General history ==
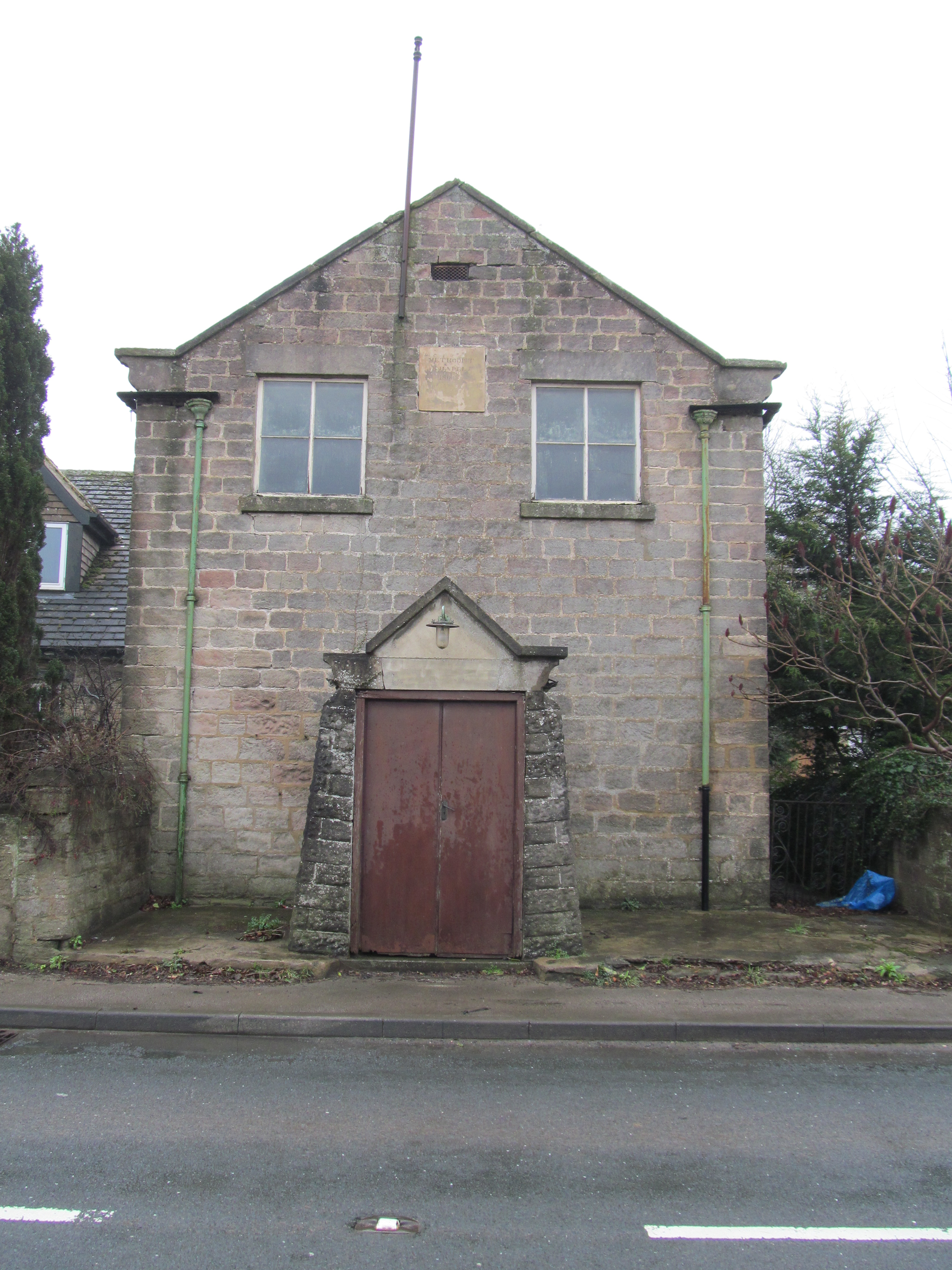
Former Wesleyan chapel, now derelict.

'Little Ribston' when translated into old English is "Ribwort/hound's-tongue stone". In the 1870s, Little Ribston was described as "RIBSTON (Little), a township, with a village, in Spofforth parish, W. R. Yorkshire; on the river Nidd, 3 miles S E of Knaresborough. Acres, 855. Real property, £1, 123. Pop., 230. Houses, 51. There are [sic] a Wesleyan chapel and a national school". The Wesleyan chapel, dated 1818 on a stone set into the facade, is remarkably plain even by Methodist standards. It is currently (2022) derelict.

== Population ==
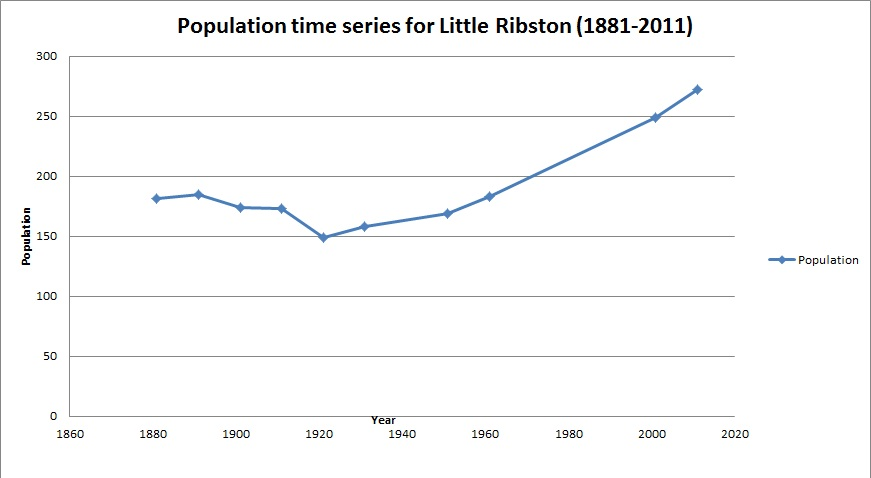
Little Ribston population time series 1881–2011

In 1881 the population of Little Ribston stood at 181 people, but by 1901 had decreased to 174 people. 10 years later, In 1911, the population of Little Ribston was only 173 people, only one less from the figure in 1901. The population of the village decreased significantly in 1921, to 149 people, mainly caused by the first world war but then gradually started to climb in the years that followed. It wasn't until 1961 when the population over took the figure from the 1911 census data, in the so-called Post–World War II baby boom when the population stood at 183 people. Since the 1960s the population of Little Ribston has increased year on year. It had a population of 272, according to the 2011 census data.

== Governance ==
Little Ribston is in the electoral ward of Ribston. This ward stretches east to Kirk Hammerton and has a total population taken at the 2011 Census of 3,015.

From 1974 to 2023 it was part of the Borough of Harrogate, it is now administered by the unitary North Yorkshire Council.

== Occupational history ==
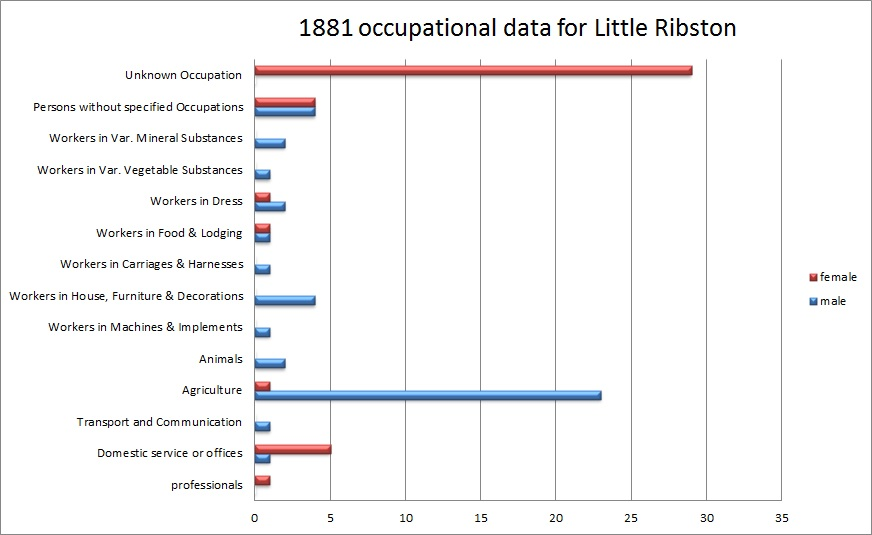
1881 occupational data for Little Ribston

Occupational Census data since 1881 can help to show how Little Ribston's employment sector has changed over time. The 1881 census report on Occupational orders in Little Ribston does not tell us much about Female employment as 29 women were classed as an unknown occupation. As for the Male figures, 23 men worked in agriculture, the highest employment sector in the area, with other industries only having one or two workers. In 2011 however the figures look very different. Agriculture is no longer the highest employer among males, as only four males now work in this industry. Manufacturing now has 10% of male workers and Construction 12% of male workers however surprisingly the highest employment sector in Little Ribston for males is Wholesale repair of motor Vehicles and motor Cycles with 25% of males working in this sector. Unlike 1881 we now know more about female employment, and as of 2011 14.9% of women in Little Ribston Work in education, whilst 13.5% work in Human Health and Social Work Activities.

== Growth of households in the village ==
In 1891 there were a total of 49 Households in the village, however this had decreased to 42 in 1921, following the aftermath of the First World War and the destruction to the North-east region of the uk. Houses were constantly being built in the village ever since the early 1900s and according to the 2011 census data there were 121 households in the village, a vast contrast to a century ago.

== Age structure ==
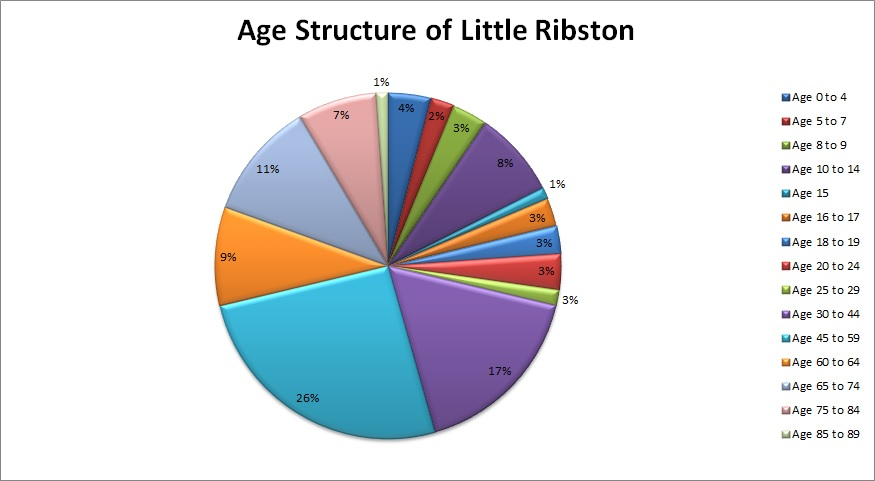
Age structure of Little Ribston

According to the 2011 census data which shows the age structure of the people who live in Little Ribston, 16.9% of people were between the ages of 30–44, 25.7% of people were aged between 45–59 and 11% of people between 65 and 74. This data tells us that the age structure in Little Ribston is relatively middle aged with over a quarter of the population between the ages of 45 and 59.

== Houses and land ownership ==
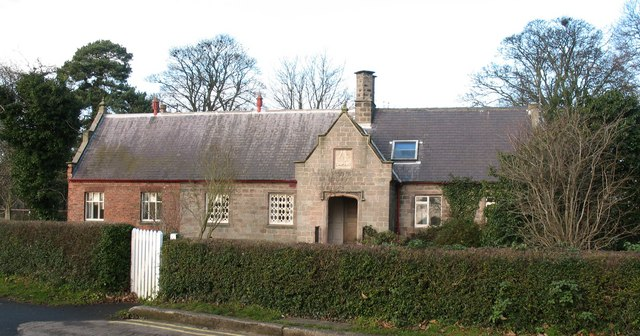
Former village school, Little Ribston

The houses and land were once owned jointly by the Earl of Harewood and the Ribston Park Estate – the latter includes Ribston Hall which has had a long and varied history. Originally a preceptory of the Knights Templar, it was bought by Joseph Dent in 1835. A forward-thinking and good landlord, he built a school at Little Ribston in 1845 and made improvements to a carpenter's shop in the village to transform it into a mission room in 1860. This was later renamed St Helen's church.

== St Helen's Chapel of Ease ==
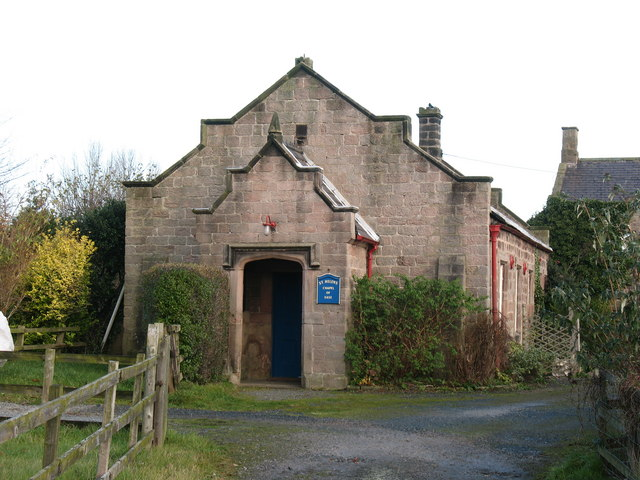
St Helen's Chapel of Ease

St Helen's Chapel of Ease is located on the bend in the Knaresborough to Wetherby road directly opposite the turning to Spofforth. (A chapel of ease is a building designated for worship within a parish, other than the official parish church.) The building was provided by Joseph Dent of Ribston Hall. It had been a carpenter's shop. Dent added a western porch in the Tudor style, inserted lattice windows and panelled the lower walls of the main room in pinewood panelling said to have been brought from Ribston Hall. The room at the east of the building was designed as a village reading room and was so used for many years.

== See also ==
- Listed buildings in Little Ribston
