= Crimplene =

Polyester fibre popular in the 1960s

Crimplene is a texturised continuous fibre launched in 1959, produced by modifying Terylene. The patent was taken out by Mario Nava of Chesline and Crepes Ltd of Macclesfield, and sold to ICI Fibres. ICI licensed the product to various throwsters. The largest producer was William Tatton of Leek, and the Golborne factory was at one time capable of taking the entire output of ICI's Wilton production of Terylene.

Although it was highly profitable in the 1960s, the market collapsed in the 1970s, with ICI taking control of Tattons and Qualitex to form Intex Yarns. Production was dramatically reduced, and ICI sold Intex at a later stage with it closing completely some time later. Unifi bought Intex Yarns in 2000, taking over the former ICI plant.

== History ==
Astronlon-C, a polyamide yarn, and Astralene-C, a polyester yarn, were irritating to the skin when made into clothing. Companies had been trying for some time to find an artificial yarn alternative.

By boiling them for varying periods in a domestic pressure cooker at home, Dennis Hibbert, chief textile engineer at Cheslene and Crepes Sutton Mills, Macclesfield, believed he had found the answer. Along with the chief engineer at Scraggs Ltd, Macclesfield, they designed a machine to replicate his findings. The name "Crimplene" was chosen for two reasons: the Crimple Valley nearby to ICI's headquarters in Harrogate, and the word "crimp" (meaning to fold and press). After successful trials, Hibbert's wife Margaret wore the first Crimplene dress, and the patent rights were sold to ICI.

A 1960 article in the industry journal The Hosiery Times describing the new fabric was followed by widespread publicity and a range of Crimplene clothing was launched at a series of fashion shows in London, Paris, New York and Milan. Widespread retailing began in the mid-1960s along with a substantial and enduring advertisement campaign that stressed its convenient 'wash-and-wear' properties. Crimplene was particularly suited to the fashionable A-line dress styles of 1960s fashion and soon became synonymous for budget-priced fashions for young women and for children. Crimplene suits were also regarded in some countries as "working-men's going-out clothes".

From the early-1970s Crimplene began to fall out of fashion in the UK and its use was increasingly in day wear for the suburban middle-aged. Lighter-weight polyester fabrics had been introduced and were preferred for their tailoring qualities, ease of movement and shape, and especially ventilation. Consumers complained that Crimplene retained body odour and was subject to surface 'bobbling'. Later, preferences drifted towards natural cottons.

Mario Nava received an OBE in June 1979.
