= Pannal =

Village in North Yorkshire, England

Coordinates: 53.96094°N 1.53623°W

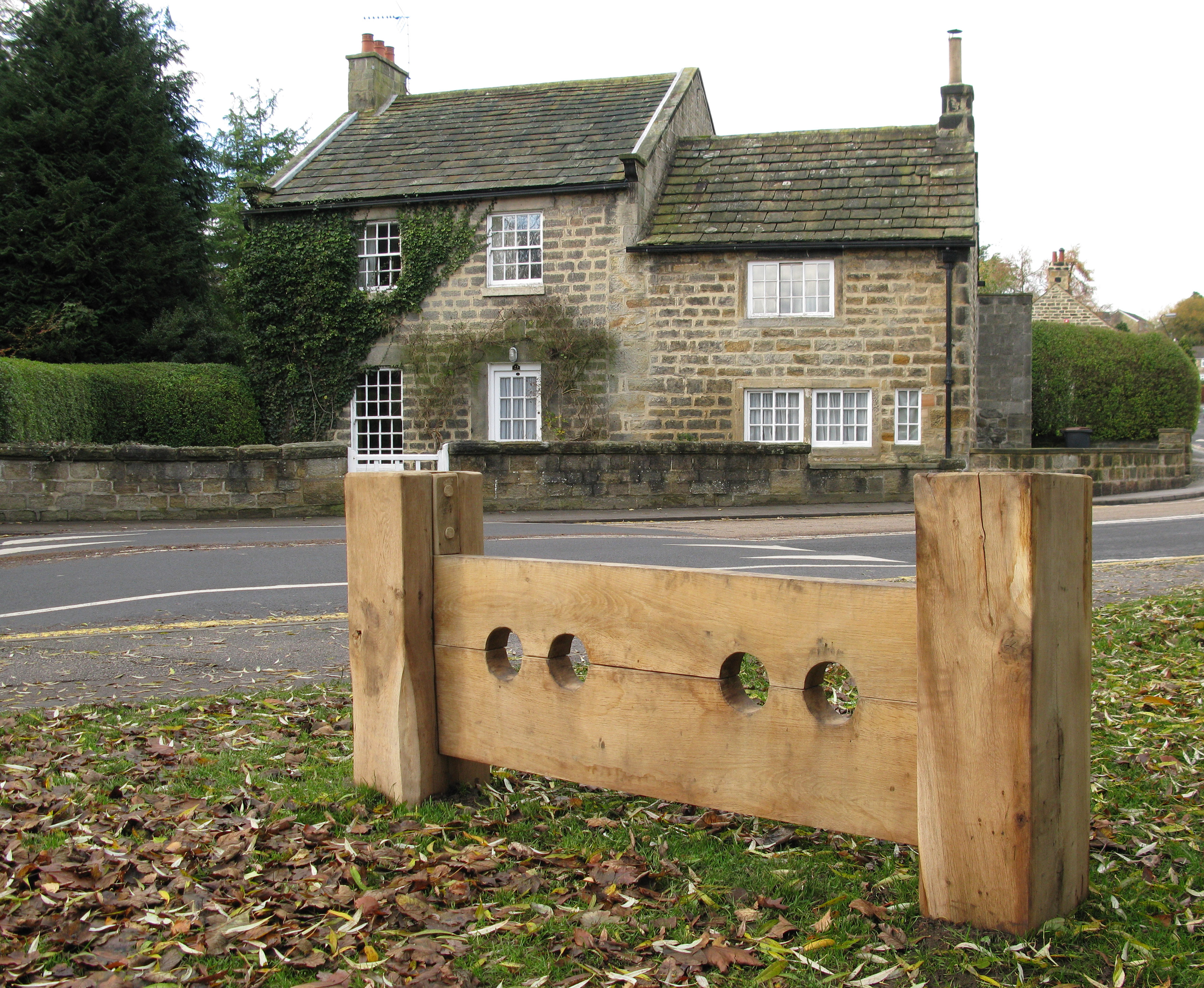
- Pannal stocks

- Location within North Yorkshire
- Population: 5,562 (2011.ward)
- OS grid reference: SE305517
- Civil parish: Pannal and Burn Bridge
- Unitary authority: North Yorkshire
- Ceremonial county: North Yorkshire
- Region: Yorkshire and the Humber
- Country: England
- Sovereign state: United Kingdom
- Post town: HARROGATE
- Postcode district: HG3
- Dialling code: 01423
- Police: North Yorkshire
- Fire: North Yorkshire
- Ambulance: Yorkshire
- UK Parliament: Harrogate and Knaresborough

Pannal is a village in the county of North Yorkshire, England. Historically part of the West Riding of Yorkshire, it is situated to the immediate south of Harrogate. Since 2016 it has formed part of the new civil parish of Pannal and Burn Bridge.

== History and etymology ==
Pannal has been an important settlement for centuries. It developed in the middle of the former Knaresborough Forest and is believed to date back to the Bronze Age.

Pannal was earlier known as Rossett, recorded in the Domesday Book of 1086 as Rosert (from the Old English hross hyrst, meaning "horse wood"). Until the early 19th century the village of Pannal was part of Beckwith with Rossett, one of the eleven constabularies within the Forest of Knaresborough, but the parish, which appears to have covered the same area as the constabulary, was known as Pannal. The name Rossett survives in the suburb of Rossett Green, 1 mile north of the village, and in the nearby Rossett School.

The name Pannal is first recorded in 1170. Its etymology is explained by Watts:

Possibly 'nook of land in the broad, shallow pan-shaped valley'. Panhal(e) 1170–1457, Panehal(e) 13th cent., Panall 1301, 1377, Pannall 1409–1590. OE panne + halh. The exact sense of panne is uncertain; it might alternatively here be an early instance of the sense 'depression in the ground in which water stands', recorded from 1594: hence possibly 'nook of land with a hollow where water stands'.

By the early fourteenth century, Pannal had become a thriving market village with weekly markets and an annual four-day fair. The parish of Pannal covered a large area, including Beckwith, Beckwithshaw, Brackenthwaite and Low Harrogate. In 1894 Low Harrogate became part of the new Municipal Borough of Harrogate, and in 1938 the village of Pannal was also added to Harrogate. This left the village of Pannal outside the civil parish of Pannal. This confusing situation continued until 2010, when the civil parish was renamed Beckwithshaw.

One of today's most significant structures in Pannal is Pannal Hall, rebuilt in 1860 after a 200-year history.

== Governance ==
Pannal was part of the West Riding of Yorkshire until 1974, when it was transferred to the new county of North Yorkshire. From 1974 to 2023 it was part of the Borough of Harrogate. It is now administered by the unitary North Yorkshire Council.

As a result of the transfer of the village to the municipal borough of Harrogate in 1938, Pannal had no parish council to represent its interests. In 1974 it became part of the unparished area of Harrogate. However the village remained a distinct community separate from Harrogate, and in the 1990s local residents formed the Pannal Village Society to give the village a voice. A local campaign led in 2016 to the formation of a new civil parish for the village and the neighbouring village of Burn Bridge, known as Pannal and Burn Bridge.

== Churches ==
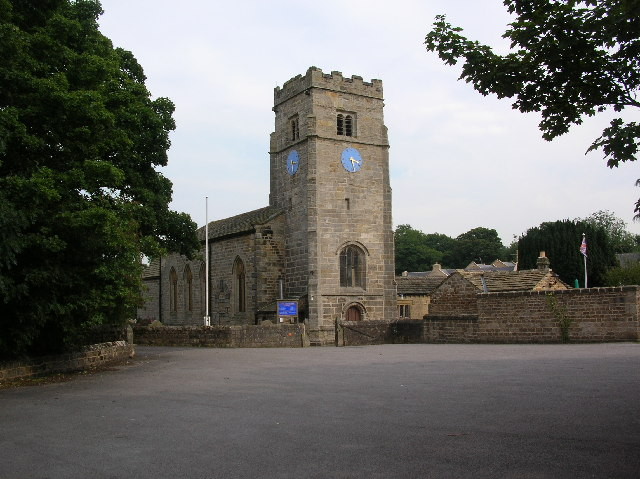
St Robert's Church, Pannal

=== St Robert's church ===
This is the main parish church in Pannal.

=== Pannal Methodist church ===
The church was built in 1905 to replace the 1778 Wesleyan structure.

== Community facilities ==
=== Pannal Memorial Hall ===
The building, originally called the Oddfellows Hall, was built in 1888. On 24 May 1919, a parish meeting considered a suggestion to erect a village institute in memory of the boys who belonged to the neighbourhood and who had fallen in the 1914–18 war. Instead, the villagers resolved to approach the Society of Oddfellows about purchasing the existing Oddfellows Hall. A figure of £600 was agreed upon and, on 11 November 1920, the "Pannal Memorial Hall" was opened by Major Cross.

The Memorial Hall has served Pannal well ever since. Mr Midgeley's Mason Band played for all the dances held there in the 1930s. Children's Christmas parties started to be held there from 1928. There was the Pannal Women's Dramatic Society, and during the Second World War films were shown for the troops stationed in the area. There was the initial Baby Health Clinic, "Keep Fit" classes, children's "Play Groups" and many other community activities.

=== Scout Hall ===
1st Pannal Scout Group is based in the old school on Spring Lane. Built in 1817 it remained the home of the village school until new school buildings were opened on Pannal Green in 1967. The Scout Group, founded in 1948, had previously met in the Parochial Hall on Church Lane (now a private residence), moving into their new headquarters in 1969.

== Notable people ==
Stand-up comedian Maisie Adam hails from Pannal.

== Landmarks and places of interest ==
- Central Pannal includes a Post Office, dentist, Doctors Practice and a hairdresser.
- Leeds Road: This includes two petrol stations, two car showrooms and two garden centres. The site of the former Dunlopillo factory, behind one of the car showrooms and beside the railway line, has been the subject of plans for a business park. There has also been an application for change of use of one of the industrial units into a gym.
- Spacey Houses: This area is historically separated from Pannal by the Leeds–Harrogate road (A61). The Spacey Houses Public House, demolished in or around 2004, was on the Pannal side, or west side, of the A61. It was not named for its location, but for the coaching inn on the Spacey Houses side, or east side, of the road, which had become a farm house and as of 2013 was being converted into private housing.
- Pannal Golf Club has been open since 8 September 1906 on Follifoot Road.

== Transport ==
=== Rail ===
Pannal railway station serves the village of Pannal, including Burn Bridge, in North Yorkshire, England. It is located on the Harrogate line 15 miles (24 km) north of Leeds station and is operated by Northern, who provide all passenger train services. During Monday to Saturday daytimes, there is a half-hourly service from Pannal southbound to Leeds and a half-hourly service northbound to Knaresborough and York.

It is a busy station considering the size of the village it serves. This is due to the large number of commuters using the station for journeying into Leeds every weekday.

=== Road ===
The village is served by the A61 road to Leeds and Harrogate. It is also at the heart of the local road network.

=== Bus ===
- Route 36 serves Pannal every 15 minutes (hourly evenings & 30 minutes Sundays) to Leeds and Harrogate & Ripon.
- Route 767 serves Pannal every 90 minutes to Leeds-Bradford Airport (all times) and Harrogate (evenings only).
- Route X52 serves Pannal every 2 hours (except evenings & Sundays) to Ilkley, Pool & Otley and Harrogate.
- Route X53 serves Pannal every 2 hours (except evenings & Sundays) to Guiseley, Pool & Otley and Harrogate.

== Local government development plans ==
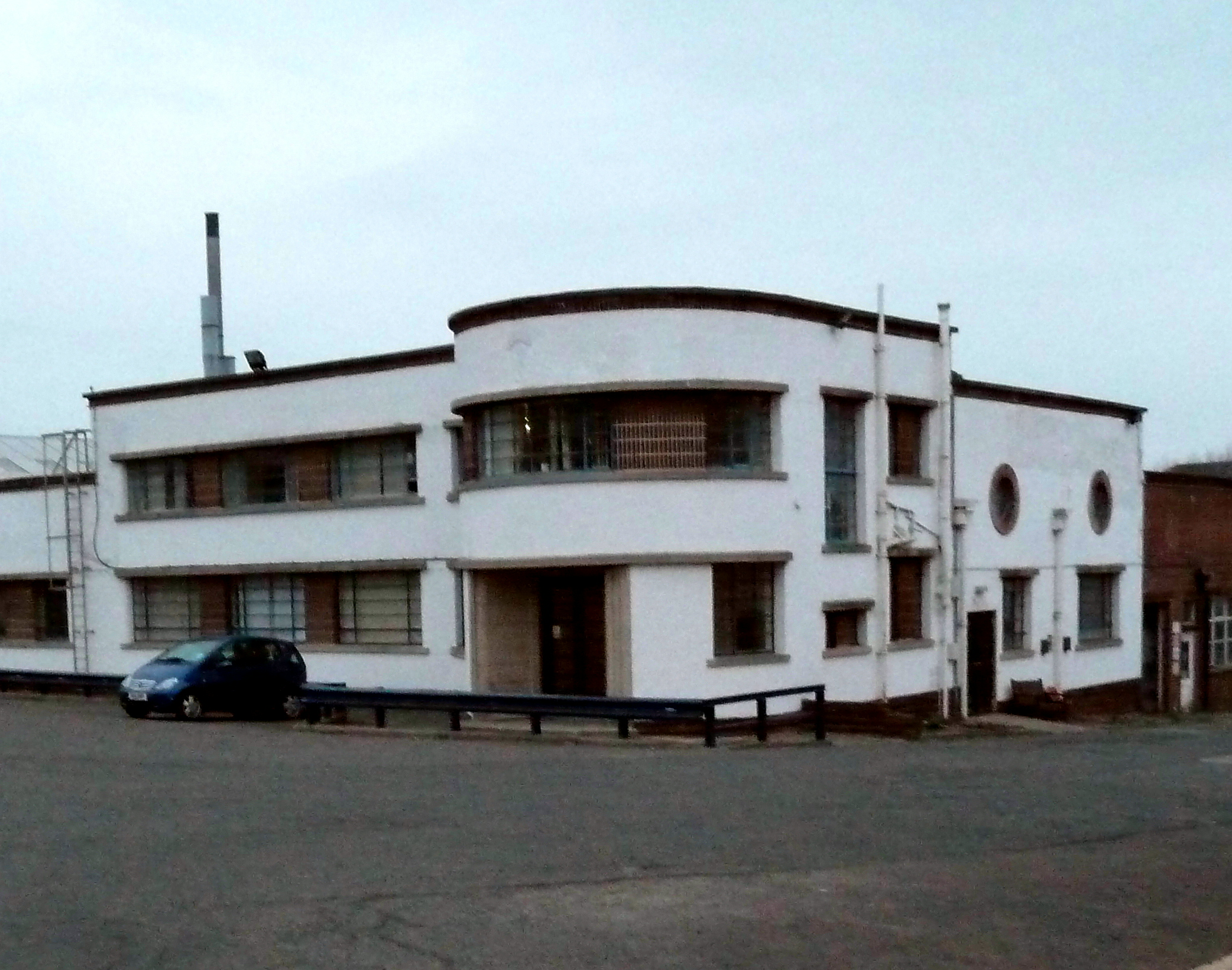
Dunlopillo art deco facade of office building

In March 2009, there was a strategic housing land availability assessment. In March 2013, a suggested plan was revealed for building houses and a business park on the Dunlopillo factory site. The Dunlopillo art deco facade of the office building would be demolished according to this plan, which as of March 2013 was not yet finalised.

== See also ==
- Listed buildings in Pannal and Burn Bridge
