= Hornbeam Park railway station =

Railway station in North Yorkshire, England

Hornbeam Park
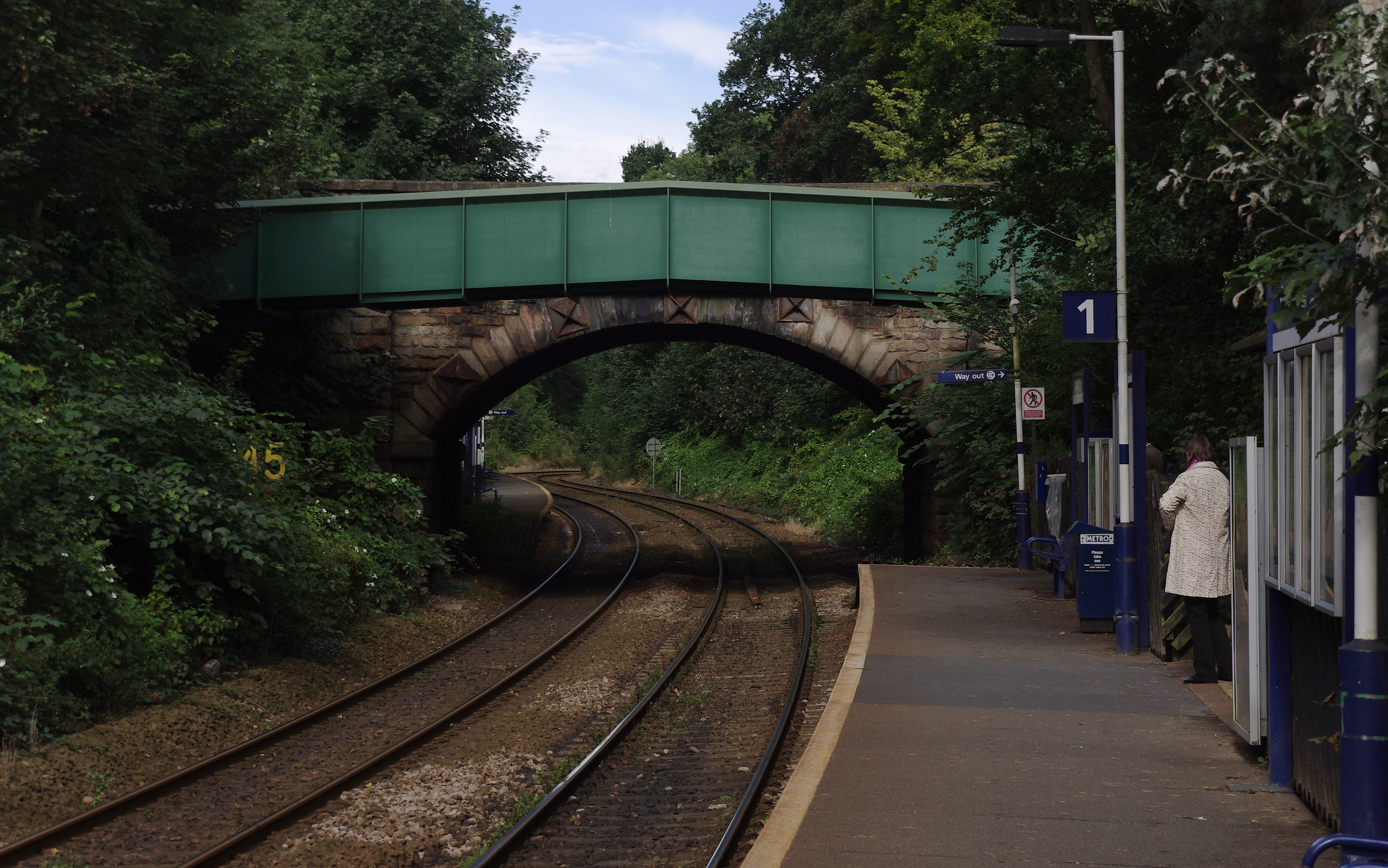

General information
- Location: Harrogate, North Yorkshire; England
- Coordinates: 53°58′49″N 1°31′40″W
- Grid reference: SE311538
- Owner: Network Rail
- Manager: Northern Trains
- Transit authority: West Yorkshire Passenger Transport Executive
- Platforms: 2
- Tracks: 2

Other information
- Station code: HBP
- Fare zone: 6
- Classification: DfT category F1

History
- Original company: British Rail (Regional Railways)

Key dates
- 24 August 1992: Opened

Passengers
- 2020/21: ▼86,936
- 2021/22: ▲0.264 million
- 2022/23: ▲0.326 million
- 2023/24: ▲0.368 million
- 2024/25: ▲0.458 million
Location
- Location within North Yorkshire
Notes
- Passenger statistics from the Office of Rail and Road

Hornbeam Park is a railway station on the Harrogate Line, which runs between Leeds and York via Harrogate. The station, situated 17 1/4 miles (28 km) north of Leeds, and serves the spa town of Harrogate in North Yorkshire, England. It is owned by Network Rail and managed by Northern Trains.

== History ==
The funding for the station was shared between Harrogate Council, North Yorkshire Council, Hornbeam Business Park, Harrogate College of Arts and Technology and the Homeowners Friendly Society. The land for the station was given by ICI. Construction started at the end of March 1992. The station was built at a cost of £413,000 (equivalent to £911,315 in 2025) and was opened by gardening expert and broadcaster Geoffrey Smith who planted a hornbeam tree in the presence of the Mayor of Harrogate, Barbara Hillier. It opened to traffic on 24 August 1992.

It is located just to the south of the junction where the original line left to go to the terminus station at Harrogate Brunswick.

Access to both platforms is step-free, and although the station is unstaffed (so ticket must be purchased on the train), ramps are available for access to the trains from the platforms. The station has basic shelters on each platform (which are offset from each other) and train running details are provided via automatic announcements, timetable posters and CIS displays.

== Services ==
As of the May 2023 timetable change, the station is served by two trains per hour between Leeds and York via Harrogate and Knaresborough all week (including Sundays). Additional services operate at peak time, whilst the evening service drops to hourly and the last two eastbound trains terminate at Harrogate. All services are operated by Northern Trains.

Rolling stock used: British Rail Class 150, British Rail Class 155, Class 158 Express Sprinter and Class 170 Turbostar

Preceding station	National Rail	Following station
Pannal	Northern Trains; Harrogate Line	Harrogate
