= Burn Bridge =

Village in North Yorkshire, England

Coordinates: 53°57′37″N 1°32′44″W

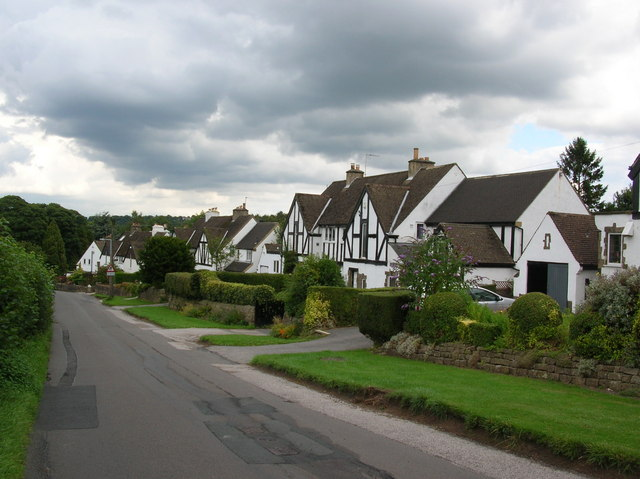
- Cottages on Spring Lane

- Location within North Yorkshire
- Population: 5,545
  - Density: 1.16 per hectare
- OS grid reference: SE300515
- Civil parish: Pannal and Burn Bridge
- Unitary authority: North Yorkshire
- Ceremonial county: North Yorkshire
- Region: Yorkshire and the Humber
- Country: England
- Sovereign state: United Kingdom
- Post town: HARROGATE
- Postcode district: HG3
- Dialling code: 01423
- Police: North Yorkshire
- Fire: North Yorkshire
- Ambulance: Yorkshire
- UK Parliament: Harrogate and Knaresborough
- Website: Burn Bridge included in Pannal website

Burn Bridge is a village in the county of North Yorkshire, England. It is 2.5 miles (4.0 km) south of the town of Harrogate, and forms part of the civil parish of Pannal and Burn Bridge.

Burn Bridge is set largely on the side of a hill. The Crimple Beck runs through the lower area of the village. Burn Bridge plays host to Pannal Cricket Club and the Black Swan pub.

== History ==
The name was first recorded in 1666 (as Burne Bridge), and appears to mean "burnt bridge". There has been speculation that the place may have been named after a fire destroyed the bridge. It has also been suggested that the bridge was named after the burn, or beck which runs along its southern edge.

Burn Bridge was historically in the township of North Rigton in the ancient parish of Kirkby Overblow in the West Riding of Yorkshire. In 1938 it was part of the area transferred to the municipal borough and civil parish of Harrogate. In 1974 it was transferred with the rest of the municipal borough to the county of North Yorkshire, and became part of the unparished area of Harrogate. In 2016 it became part of the new civil parish of Pannal and Burn Bridge. From 1974 to 2023 it was part of the Borough of Harrogate, it is now administered by the unitary North Yorkshire Council.

== The village today ==
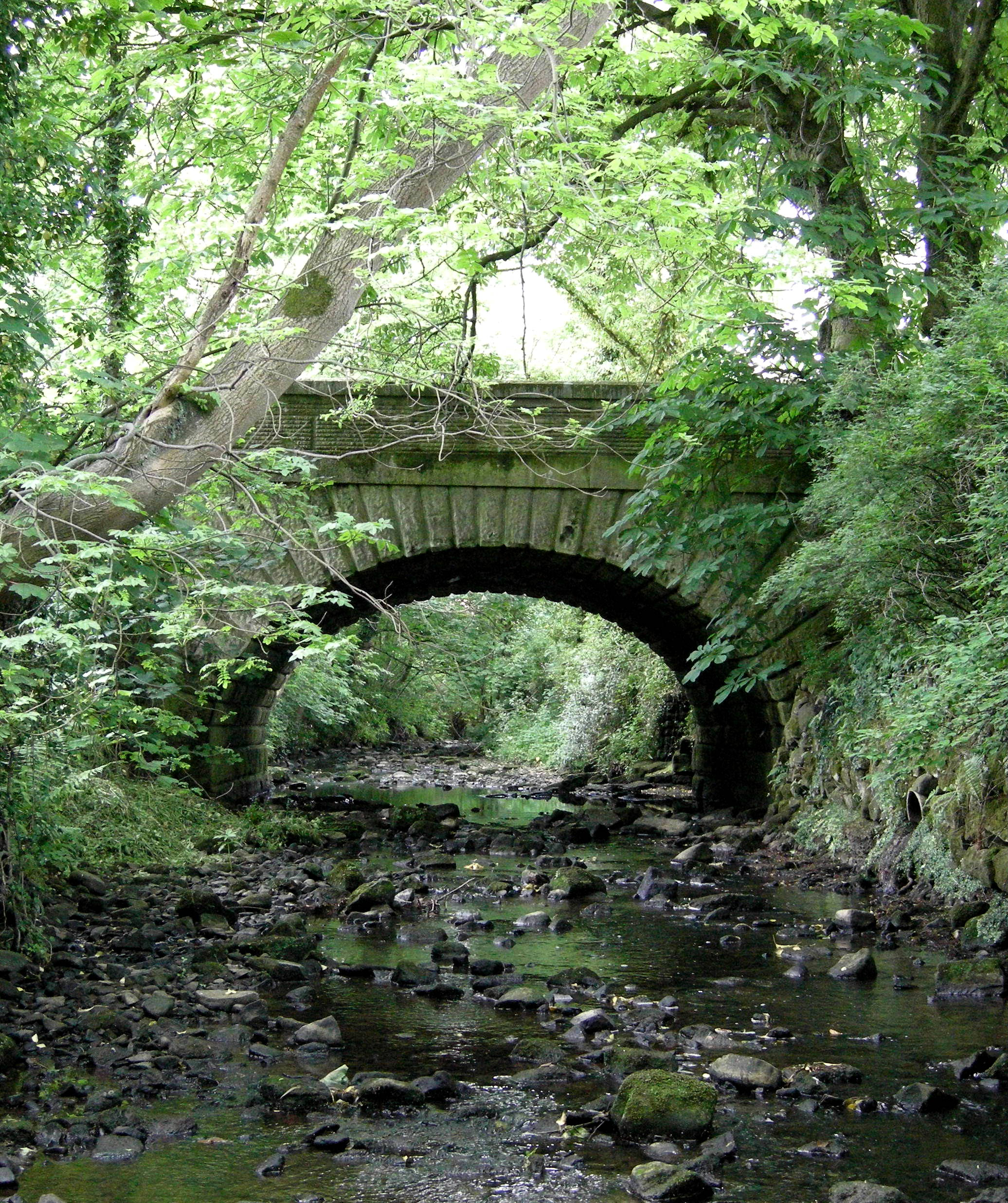
View of bridge from Crimple Beck, looking west.

The village is now mainly a dormitory for commuters to Harrogate and Leeds, a few Menwith Hill employees and many retired people. To the west is mostly pasture land with sheep and cattle. There are two riding stables in the area. To the east is Pannal which expanded, when Crimple Meadows was built in the 1970s, to the point at which it would have joined with Burn Bridge. A condition on building permission for Crimple Meadows was that there would be only a footpath and no roads, between the two villages, to maintain their separate identities.

The nearest shop, school and church are at the adjacent village of Pannal. The village's only community centre is the Black Swan pub, so its Fifth of November gatherings and other annual celebrations tend to take place in the pub garden, apart from the August bank holiday gala which takes place at Pannal Cricket Ground. A mobile library visits Westminster Drive for 10 minutes and Spring Lane for 20 minutes every few weeks.

=== The Black Swan pub ===
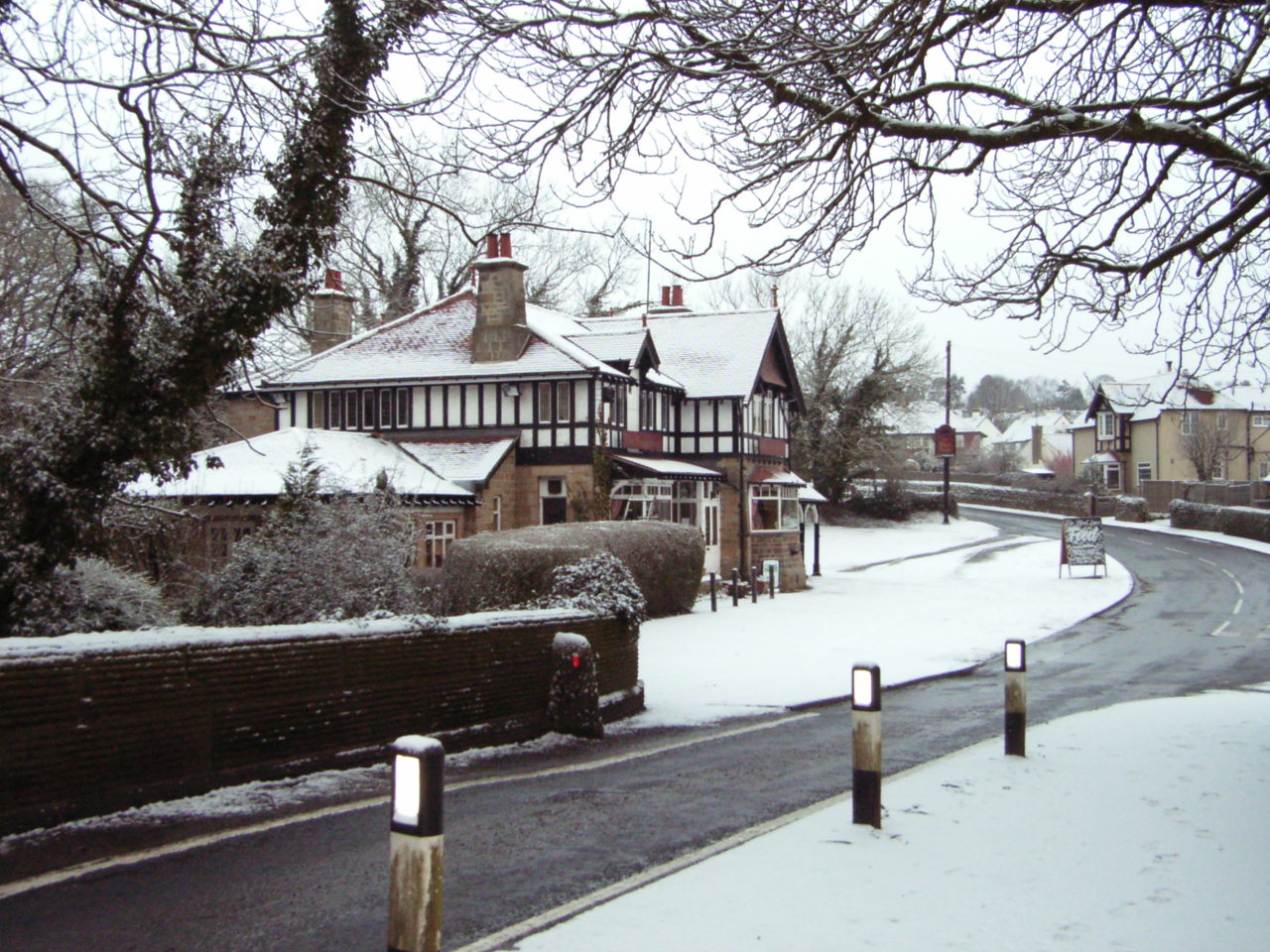
The Black Swan pub on Burn Bridge Road.

Its local name is the Mucky Duck. Apparently there has been a hostelry on the site since charcoal burners used it in c. 1650. Opposite the pub on Burn Bridge Road was the smithy, later a grocer's shop until the 1960s and now converted to an office.

== Public transport ==
The only public transport serving the village is the 110 Harrogate Bus Company village bus to Harrogate at two-hourly intervals on weekdays; fewer on Saturdays. Otherwise the nearest bus route is the 36 between Leeds and Ripon, via Pannal and Harrogate. Pannal railway station is the nearest rail link, providing trains to Leeds, and to York via Harrogate, at half-hourly intervals Monday to Sunday.

== The Westminster estate ==
This estate, known locally as the Westminsters, contains some houses built in the 1920s. It was expanded by 147 houses in the 1950s, and c. 65 more were added by George Wimpey by 1961 on a slope where there were once drystone-walled pastures and a small wood. In Westminster Drive there are the two last remaining thatched houses in the area, and a Victorian house built before 1860, which was once called The Horst.

== Allan Wood ==
This little bluebell wood forms the boundary between Burn Bridge and Pannal Recreation Ground. Originally a commercial planting of softwood, it is now owned by Harrogate Borough Council which maintains it as a local amenity, and is in the process of gradually re-planting it with indigenous trees.

== Malthouse Lane ==
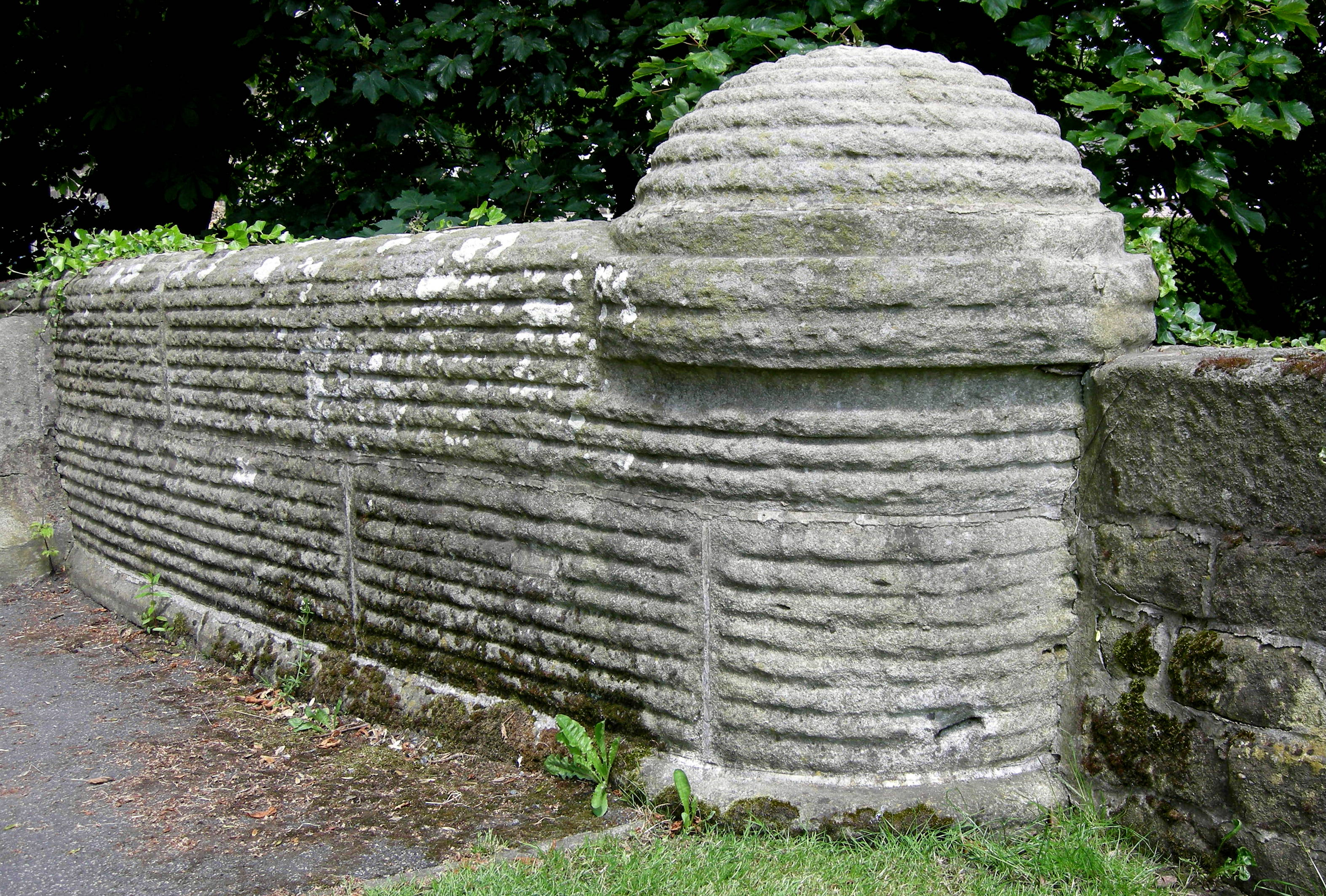
Stonework on the bridge at the end of Malthouse Lane.

This marks the southern edge of the Burn Bridge settlement, and runs alongside Crimple Beck.

=== Malthouse Lane courtyard and milldam ===
There were mills on the site next to Malthouse Lane bridge from the 14th century. The corn mill nearest to the bridge backed onto the milldam, and housed the water wheel. Now converted to housing, it still contains the original wooden bevel gears which were driven by the water wheel. The milldam was fed from Crimple Beck via a goit upstream, and the water ran off via a culvert under the corn mill and returned to the stream near Malthouse Lane bridge. The milldam was drained c. 1975 and is now a wildlife preserve under a woodland preservation order. Fauna such as woodpeckers and willow warblers are colonising this site.

The Victorian house between the courtyard and Pannal Cricket Ground is Bridge House, which was once the farm house of Thomas Hudson, who owned much of the local land to the south of Crimple Beck. His barn stands on the other side of the cricket ground, and is now converted to housing. The barn had cow byres and stables behind. The attached semicircular gin gang, where a horse turned the grinding mill for the corn, existed until the winter of 2010–2011, when it was demolished to be rebuilt as domestic accommodation.

=== The malthouse ===
The malthouse was built on farmland nearby, in what is now Malthouse Lane. The malthouse was built c. 1876 by farmer Thomas Hudson, who bought the land for the purpose in that year from landowner Eliza Penelope Bentley of Pannal Hall. Wagons brought coal and barley from a railway siding whose remaining containing wall for the coal can still be seen by the Harrogate Line. The malthouse was demolished in 1975, but the malthouse manager's house remains. The cobbled yard of that house was the malthouse coalyard, and steps once led down from the coalyard to the boiler room and river. Four houses, built in 1975, now stand on the malthouse site.

=== Rose Cottage ===
Crimple Beck Cottage, the two-storey house opposite the malthouse which was previously called Rose Cottage, was built before 1840. An early 20th-century photograph of the malthouse shows Rose Cottage as a much smaller single-storey building.

== Crimple Beck ==
Some reaches of the Crimple Beck which passes through Burn Bridge are protected with associated SSSIs and SINCs, and freshwater fish and crayfish are protected under various Acts. The river does have a history of mink preying on other animals, but there are still mallards, moorhens, herons, kingfishers and grey wagtails, besides more common birds.

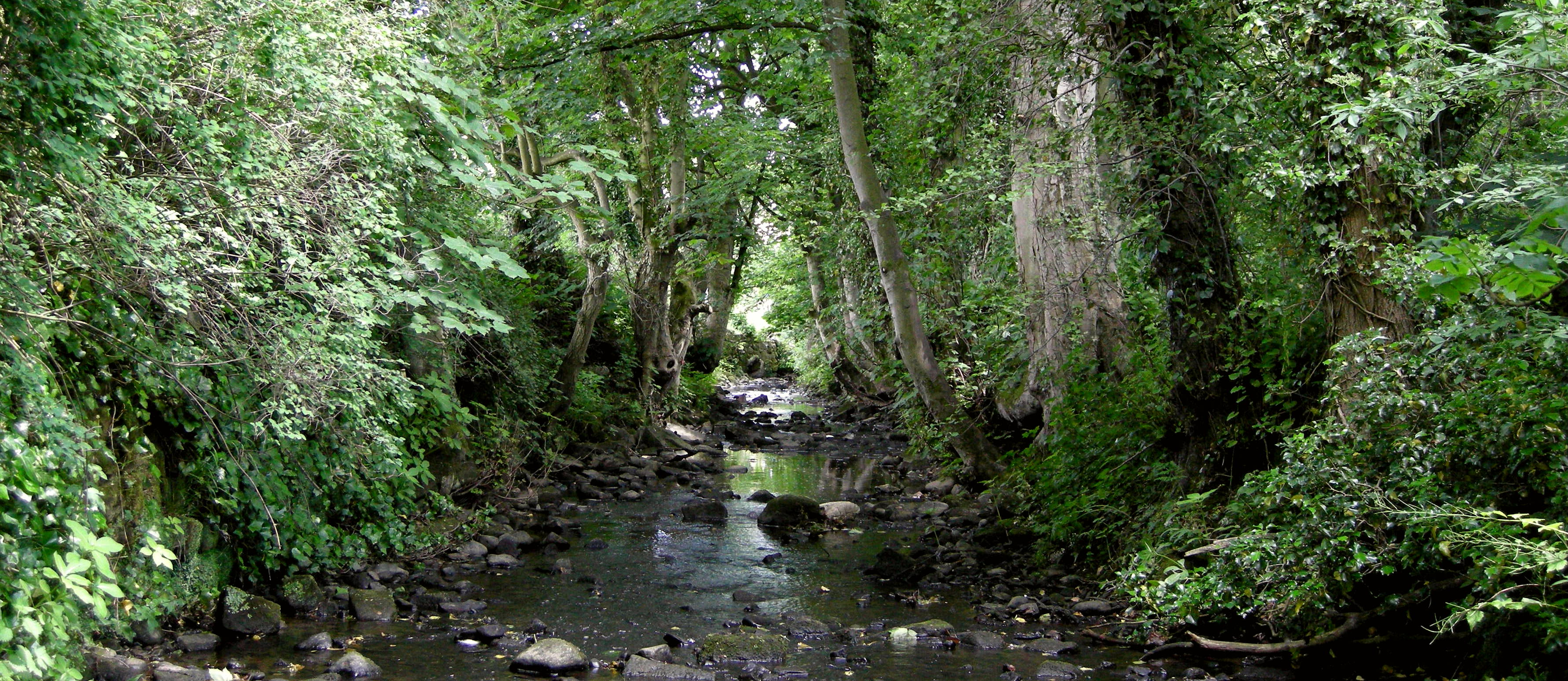
View of Crimple Beck, looking east from under the bridge.

=== Flooding history ===
Around the Crimple Beck area, at the bottom of the hill, there have been several floods in living memory. The 1940s flood rose to about a yard deep in Malthouse Lane due to a river-wall collapse downstream. The July 1968 flood rose to about a yard deep in Malthouse Lane due to a culvert collapse downstream, after which the culvert under the Leeds Road was repaired and significantly enlarged. Later there were two very shallow floods: the first in December 1983 when a householder's building works temporarily dammed the beck downstream; as a consequence of this, Yorkshire Water built a low flood defence wall along part of Malthouse Lane and between some properties and the beck. The second shallow flood was in 2004 when the storm drain carrying water from the Westminster estate became blocked where it ran under a house in Malthouse Lane, and the water had to find other routes to the beck. These faults were corrected.

Finally in June 2007 there was a one-foot-deep flood in the area after a major but temporary National Grid gas-pipeline-laying operation. Very wide paths of earth were exposed and compacted for the pipelaying further upstream during the works, encouraging sudden, fast drainage across acres of bare earth into the river after heavy storms, and the beck ran too full for the first time. In a similar situation at Peckham in 2003, some residents suggested that the process of laying a pipeline had encouraged flooding; however this was denied by the pipelaying company Weeks, and by the Council which had responsibility for overseeing the works. According to the Natural Gas Forum, the proper procedure when pipelaying is to erect barriers to prevent massive, sudden storm water runoff into streams, when swathes of bare earth are exposed. Compacted soil from large-scale works can lead to increased runoff and higher peak storm flows into streams. Therefore, all of the above flooding was apparently due to human agency; no evidence has been discovered so far of the existence of a floodplain here.

== Brackenthwaite Lane ==
Close to where Brackenthwaite Lane joins Burn Bridge Road was a long, narrow thatched house in which the Dennison family of farmworkers brought up their 21 children. The site is now part of the garden of Norfolk House.

== Town planning ==
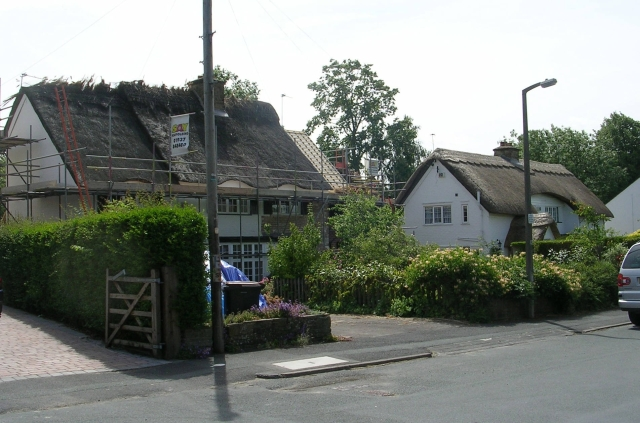
In Westminster Drive: the last thatched houses in the area

=== Future building development ===
This village is bordered on the south and west sides by pasture, which has been at intervals identified as a greenfield site by town planners. This is possibly because there is Burn Bridge or Pannal on one side of these fields and, in the distance, a main road on the other side. So far, the Pannal Village Society, local residents and certain town councillors have successfully argued against these plans, on the grounds that the village is already too much urbanised for a rural area with no official community centre of its own. It has also been suggested that Burn Bridge Road is already heavily used by commuters to and from Harrogate, such that speed-control measures have been built into the road. Already it is unsafe to walk from Burn Bridge via Burn Bridge Road to the bus stop on the Leeds-Harrogate road during the rush hour, as Burn Bridge Road is narrow and has many corners, roadside ditches and no footpath. Recent official suggestions about sites, given by town planners, are here. It was suggested in the Harrogate Advertiser in February 2008 that Harrogate Council had conceded that development in this area would impact negatively on the environment.

=== Consultation process for conservation area ===
Harrogate Borough Council has published a consultation booklet entitled: Pannal Conservation Area Character Appraisal – Draft for consultation (March 2009). This brings a small part of Burn Bridge into the proposed Pannal conservation area, while leaving most of Burn Bridge unappraised, and Burn Bridge itself is not being appraised as an independent unit.

== See also ==
- Listed buildings in Pannal and Burn Bridge
