= A661 road =

Road in England

A661

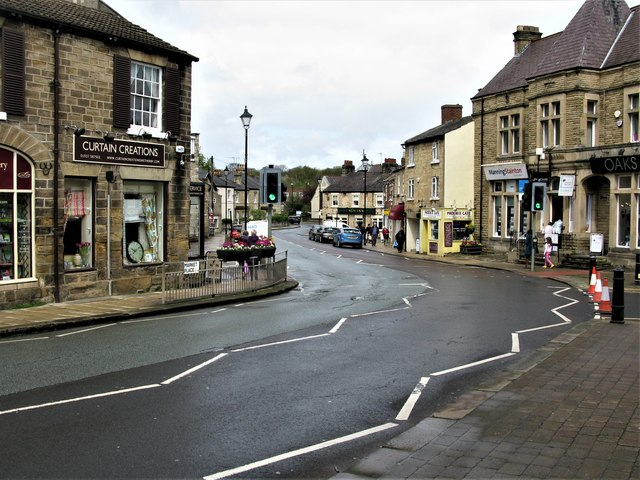
- Looking along the A661 in Wetherby facing north-west towards Harrogate

Route information
- Length: 8.4 mi (13.5 km)

Major junctions
- South East end: Wetherby
- North West end: Harrogate

Location
- Country: United Kingdom

Road network
- Roads in the United Kingdom; Motorways; A and B road zones

The A661, also known as Wetherby Road, is an A road running between Wetherby and Harrogate (via Spofforth) in West and North Yorkshire, England. The road is 8.4 miles (14 km) in length.

The A661 begins in West Yorkshire at the South Wetherby roundabout (adjacent to The Mercure Hotel) where it intersects with the A58 (St Helens to Wetherby via Leeds, Bradford and Halifax) and slip roads to gain access to junctions of the A1(M).

The A661 finishes at the Empress roundabout in Harrogate, where it intersects with the A6040 towards the town centre, and A59, towards Knaresborough and York in one direction and Skipton in the other.
