= St Mary's Church, Stainburn =

Church in North Yorkshire, England

Coordinates: 53.9325°N 1.6246°W

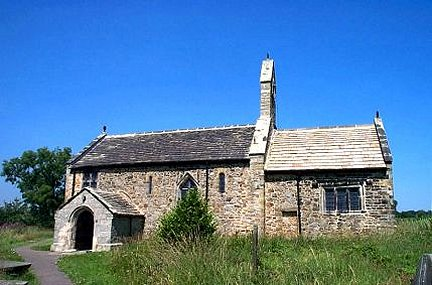
- St Mary's Church, Stainburn, from the south

- Location in North Yorkshire
- OS grid reference: SE 247 485
- Location: Stainburn, North Yorkshire
- Country: England
- Denomination: Anglican
- Website: Churches Conservation Trust

Architecture
- Functional status: Redundant
- Heritage designation: Grade I
- Designated: 22 November 1966
- Architectural type: Church
- Style: Norman, Gothic
- Groundbreaking: 12th century
- Completed: 1894

Specifications
- Materials: Gritstone, stone slate roofs

St Mary's Church is a redundant Anglican church in the village of Stainburn, North Yorkshire, England. It is recorded in the National Heritage List for England as a designated Grade I listed building, and is under the care of the Churches Conservation Trust.

== History ==
The church was built in the 12th century as a chapel of ease in the parish of Kirkby Overblow. Alterations were made to the church in the 17th century. In 1894 it was restored and additions were made by C. Hodgson Fowler. This included re-roofing the church, refitting the chancel, the addition of the vestry, and relaying of the grave slabs. St Mary's was declared redundant on 1 December 1975, and was vested in the Trust on 30 March 1977.

== Architecture ==
=== Exterior ===
St Mary's is constructed in gritstone rubble and has a graduated stone slate roof. Its plan consists of a three-bay nave with a south porch, and a single-bay chancel with a north vestry. A two-arched bellcote stands on the junction between the nave and the chancel. Much of the church is Norman in style. The porch has a round-arched doorway, and the door to the church has a plain tympanum. To the left of the door is a square-headed window and to the right are two lancet windows on each side of a window with a pointed arch. At the west end is a lancet window, and in the north wall is a two-light mullioned window. The chancel is lower and narrower than the nave. The east window has three lights and is in Perpendicular style. On the south wall of the chancel is a blocked doorway and a three-light mullioned window.

=== Interior ===
The chancel arch is Norman in style, having a round arch and two orders. The font is Norman and consists of a circular carved bowl on a circular stem. The pews date from the 16th and 17th centuries.

== See also ==
- Grade I listed buildings in North Yorkshire (district)
- Listed buildings in Stainburn, North Yorkshire
- List of churches preserved by the Churches Conservation Trust in Northern England
