= Huby, Harrogate =

Village in North Yorkshire, England

Coordinates: 53.9228°N 1.5828°W

Huby
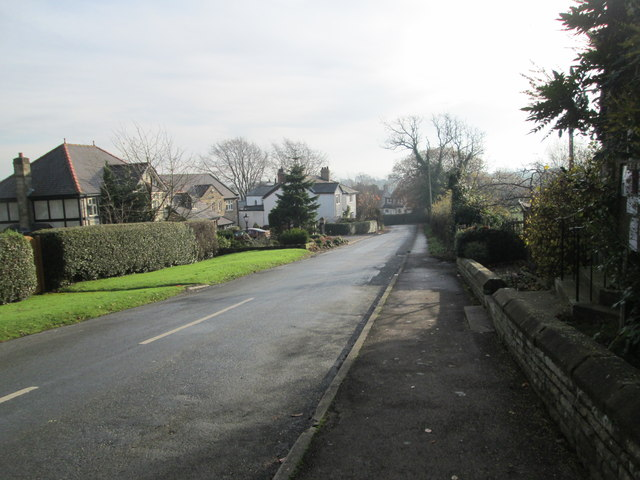
- Strait Lane, Huby (2014)

- Location within North Yorkshire
- Population: 756 (2011)
- OS grid reference: SE275475
  - London: 178.19 mi (286.77 km)
- Civil parish: Weeton
- Unitary authority: North Yorkshire
- Ceremonial county: North Yorkshire
- Region: Yorkshire and the Humber
- Country: England
- Sovereign state: United Kingdom
- Post town: LEEDS
- Postcode district: LS17
- Dialling code: 01423
- Police: North Yorkshire
- Fire: North Yorkshire
- Ambulance: Yorkshire
- UK Parliament: Skipton and Ripon
- Website: Weeton Parish Council

Huby is a village in the county of North Yorkshire, located approximately 5 miles (8 km) south of the town of Harrogate and 8.63 miles (13.89 km) north of the city of Leeds. According to the University of Nottingham English Place-names project, the settlement name Huby could mean "hōh" (Old English) a heel or sharply projecting piece of ground; "haugr" (Old Norse) a natural height, hill, or an artificial mound (e.g. burial mound); and "bȳ" (Old Norse) a farmstead, or village. The 2011 census for Huby returned 319 households and 756 residents.

From 1974 to 2023 it was part of the Borough of Harrogate, it is now administered by the unitary North Yorkshire Council.

== Transport ==
The village is on the A658 between Otley and Harrogate and is served by Weeton railway station on the line which links Leeds with Harrogate.

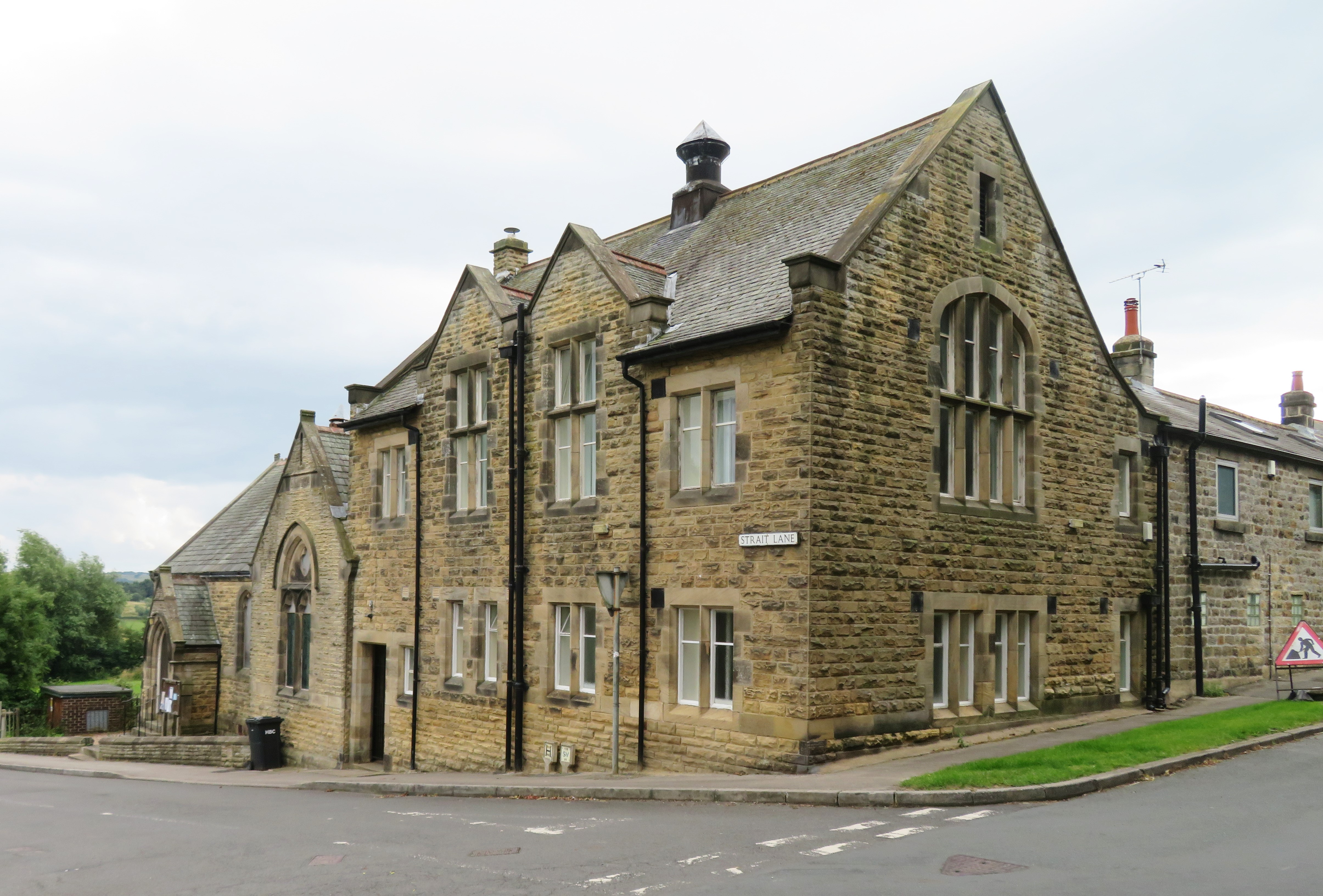
Huby Methodist Chapel (2023)

== The Chapel ==
Huby Methodist Chapel, founded 1889, is on the corner of Strait Lane, Huby. The chapel contains a stained glass window memorial dedicated to 7 soldiers who died during the First World War (1914–1918), and a brass plaque memorial is dedicated to a further 6 soldiers from the Second World War (1939–1945).

== The Post Office ==
The first mention of a post office in the village was in 1888. A telegram delivered from the post office in 1940, and a photograph of the post office, appeared as illustrations in an article in a British philatelic magazine in 1989, which recalled the contribution to the village provided by members of the Jackson family, including George Faulkes Jackson (1912–1980), who served as postmaster and as clerk to the parish council. The post office closed in October 1995.

== Landmarks ==
Almscliffe Crag is a rocky outcrop 1 mile (1.6 km) north-west of the village. The outcrop is made of Warley Wise Grit (Sandstone); a Sedimentary bedrock formed between 329 and 328 million years ago during the Carboniferous period. The site is popular with climbers and boulderers.

== Sport and leisure ==
=== Brass Band ===
The Tewit Youth Band, founded in 1978, is a brass and percussion band for young players between the ages of 8 and 18. The band is currently based in the old village Methodist chapel.

=== The Weeton Show ===
The Weeton Show, is an annual summer event organised by the Weeton and District Agricultural and Horticultural Society. The show has been held at the village since it was established in 1946.

=== Tennis ===
The tennis club was founded in 1913 and is based at the Almscliffe Tennis & Bowling Club at the Almscliffe Hall, on Harrogate Road. The club's utilities include both grass and artificial courts, three of which are floodlit.

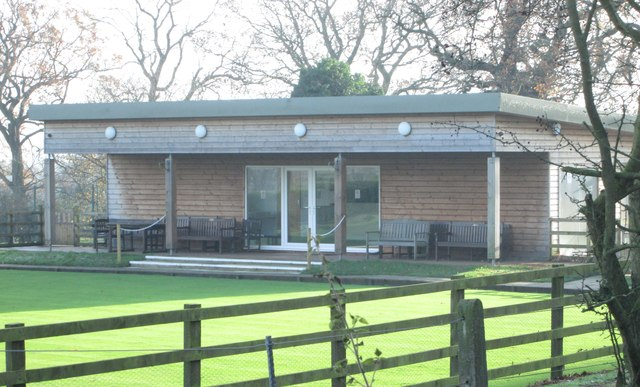
Almscliffe Bowls Pavilion (2014)

=== Bowls ===
The Almscliffe Bowling Club is based at Almscliffe Hall, on Harrogate Road. The club is active most evenings during the summer, and compete in the Harrogate Evening League, Tadcaster Evening League, and Harrogate Veterans League, alongside Internal Club competitions and friendlies.

=== Theatre ===
Weeton and Huby Players is an amateur dramatic group who perform in the Almscliffe Hall. Established in 1922, they perform 3 nights in either March or November.

=== Cricket ===
Weeton & Huby Cricket Club was a non league club situated on land south of Weeton Lane. The ground was latterly used by other clubs but was eventually abandoned at the end of the 2016 season.
