= Listed buildings in Kirkby Overblow =

Kirkby Overblow is a civil parish in the county of North Yorkshire, England. It contains 21 listed buildings that are recorded in the National Heritage List for England. Of these, one is listed at Grade II*, the middle of the three grades, and the others are at Grade II, the lowest grade. The parish contains the village of Kirkby Overblow, the hamlet of Dunkeswick, and the surrounding countryside. Most of the listed buildings are houses and associated structures and farmhouses, and the others include a church, a bridge, boundary stones, and a milestone.

== Key ==
Grade	Criteria
II*	Particularly important buildings of more than special interest
II	Buildings of national importance and special interest

== Buildings ==
Name and location	Photograph	Date	Notes	Grade
All Saints' Church; 53.93811°N 1.50693°W		14th century	The church has been altered and extended through the centuries, it was largely rebuilt between 1774 and 1804, and restored by G. E. Street in 1870–72. The church is built in gritstone with a stone slate roof, and consists of a nave, a south aisle, a south porch, a north transept, a chancel and a west tower. The tower has three stages, diagonal buttresses, Perpendicular windows, a sundial, a west clock face, two-light bell openings with hood moulds, and an embattled parapet with crocketed corner pinnacles. There are also embattled parapets on the body of the church.	II
Old Hall; 53.94172°N 1.50293°W		16th century (probable)	A house, later used for other purposes, with a timber framed core, and encased in stone in the 17th century. It has a stone slate roof, two storeys and three bays. The central doorway has chamfered jambs and a triangular lintel. Most of the windows are mullioned, some with hood moulds.	II
Field House farmhouse and outbuilding 53.94001°N 1.50019°W		17th century	The buildings are in stone with stone slate roof. The house has long and short quoins, stone coping on the roof, and shaped kneelers. There are two storeys, the doorway has a plain surround, and the windows are a mix, some are sashes, some are mullioned, and there is a blocked circular window. The outbuilding is recessed on the right, and has a doorway with a chamfered lintel, windows with chamfered surrounds, and external steps leading to an upper floor doorway.	II
Gate piers east of Old Hall; 53.94175°N 1.50266°W	—	17th century	The two gate piers are in gritstone and have a square section. The bases are about 2 metres (6 ft 7 in) high, and each pier has a moulded cornice and an obelisk.	II
Low Hall; 53.94178°N 1.50223°W		Late 17th century	The house is in gritstone, with a moulded eaves cornice, and a hipped stone slate roof with finials. There are two storeys and six bays. On the front is a doorway and a porch, and the windows are mullioned and transomed in architraves, with a moulded hood mould over the ground floor windows.	II
Gate piers and walling south of Low Hall; 53.94149°N 1.50243°W	—	Late 17th century	The gate piers are in stone on square bases, and are about 4 metres (13 ft) high. Each pier has recessed panels, a moulded cornice, and a ball and cushion finial.	II
Low Snape Farm; 53.94249°N 1.53204°W	—	Late 17th century	The house is in gritstone, with quoins, and a stone slate roof with gable coping and shaped kneelers. There are two storeys and two bays, and a rear lean-to. On the front is a gabled porch, and most of the windows are mullioned.	II
Gate piers south of Swindon Hall Farmhouse; 53.92956°N 1.52514°W		Early 18th century	The two gate piers are in stone on square plinths, and are about 2.5 metres (8 ft 2 in) high. Each pier has recessed panels, a moulded cornice, and a ball and cushion finial.	II
Harewood Bridge; 53.90985°N 1.52626°W		1729	The bridge carries Harrogate Road (A61 road) over the River Wharfe, and it was widened in 1775. It is in stone and consists of four segmental arches that have pointed cutwaters with angled caps. On the east side are chamfered voussoirs with two orders, and the west side has unchamfered voussoirs. The abutments splay out at each end, and on the bridge are inscribed metal plaques.	II*
Bridge House Cottages; 53.91035°N 1.52675°W	—	Mid 18th century	A public house, later cottages, in stone with quoins and a stone slate roof. There are two storeys, a double depth plan and three bays. The central doorway has a fanlight, to its left is a square bay window, and the other windows are sashes in architraves. The doorway and windows have wedge lintels carved to resemble voussoirs.	II
Rectory Cottages; 53.93834°N 1.50581°W		Mid 18th century	The house is in gritstone, with quoins, a floor band, and a stone slate roof with moulded kneelers and coping. There are two storeys and five bays. The round-headed doorway has a Gibbs surround, and above it is a recessed panel, also with a Gibbs surround. The windows have lintels with keystones.	II
Boundary marker at NGR SE 303500; 53.94470°N 1.54036°W		1767	The boundary marker is in stone. It has a round head, and is inscribed with initials and the date.	II
Boundary stone near Low Snape Farmhouse; 53.94178°N 1.52448°W		1767	The boundary stone is in gritstone, with a square plan, and it is about 60 centimetres (24 in) high. The stone has a rounded top, and inscribed on the west face are initials and the date.	II
Boundary stone at Wareholes Well; 53.94106°N 1.52442°W		1767	The boundary stone is in gritstone, with a square plan, and it is about 1.5 metres (4 ft 11 in) high. The stone has a rounded top, and inscribed on the west face are initials and the date.	II
Dunkeswick Lodge; 53.93410°N 1.54915°W		Late 18th century	The house is in stone, with quoins, an eaves band, and a stone slate roof with coped gables and kneelers. There are two storeys, a double depth plan, and three bays. The doorway has monolithic jambs and a fanlight, and the windows are sashes. In the apices of the gables are blind Venetian windows.	II
The Old Rectory; 53.93844°N 1.50626°W		Late 18th century	The house is in gritstone, with a sill band, a moulded eaves cornice, and a stone slate roof with stone coping and shaped kneelers. There are two storeys, a double depth plan, and six bays. In the centre is a doorway with a moulded eared architrave and a pulvinated entablature. To its left is a Venetian window with a moulded architrave, to the right is a large canted bay window with an embattled cornice, and the other windows are sashes in architraves.	II
Wharfedale Grange Farmhouse; 53.91493°N 1.53004°W	—	Early 19th century (probable)	The farmhouse is in stone, with quoins, and a stone slate roof with coped gables and kneelers. There are two storeys, a double depth plan, and four bays. The doorway has monolithic jambs, a fanlight, and a hood on brackets. The windows are sashes in architraves, and in the right return is a canted bay window.	II
Milestone; 53.92223°N 1.53060°W		Early to mid 19th century	The milestone is on the east side of Harrogate Road (A61 road). It is in stone with a cast iron plate, and it has a triangular plan and a rounded top. On the top is inscribed "LEEDS & HARROGATE ROAD" and "DUNKESWICK", on the left face are the distances to Harewood and Leeds, and on the right face to Harrogate.	II
Swindon Hall Farmhouse; 53.92979°N 1.52524°W		c. 1840	The house is in gritstone with deep eaves and a hipped stone slate roof. There are two storeys and three bays. The central doorway has a moulded Tudor arched head and a hood mould. The windows are sashes with plain surrounds and hood moulds.	II
Boundary stone next to Lane End Farm; 53.93156°N 1.53766°W		19th century	The boundary stone is in gritstone, with a cast iron plate and a triangular plan, and it is about 50 centimetres (20 in) high. There are inscriptions on the top and the plate, and on the back is a benchmark.	II
Boundary stone at SE2996350160; 53.94675°N 1.54490°W		19th century	The stone marks the boundary between the parishes of Kirkby Overblow and Rigton, and is on the northwest side of the A658 road. It is in gritstone with cast iron plates, it has a triangular plan, and is about 40 centimetres (16 in) high. On each side is an inscribed plate, and on the back is a benchmark.	II
