= Weeton, North Yorkshire =

Village and civil parish in North Yorkshire, England

Coordinates: 53°55′04″N 1°33′52″W

Weeton
- Location within North Yorkshire
- Population: 929 (2011)
- OS grid reference: SE285466
- Unitary authority: North Yorkshire
- Ceremonial county: North Yorkshire
- Region: Yorkshire and the Humber
- Country: England
- Sovereign state: United Kingdom
- Post town: LEEDS
- Postcode district: LS17
- Police: North Yorkshire
- Fire: North Yorkshire
- Ambulance: Yorkshire

Weeton is a village and civil parish in the county of North Yorkshire, England, 5 miles (8 km) south of the town of Harrogate. The civil parish includes the larger village of Huby, 1 mile (1.6 km) north-west of Weeton, where Weeton railway station is situated.

The name is first attested in the Domesday Book of 1086 as Widetun(e)/Wideton(e) and seems to derive from Old English wiðig 'willow' and tūn 'settlement, estate, farm', thus meaning 'willow farm'.

Until 1974 it was part of the West Riding of Yorkshire. From 1974 to 2023 it was part of the Borough of Harrogate. It is now administered by the unitary North Yorkshire Council.

The village is largely populated by commuters working in Leeds and Bradford. Weeton has no pub, shop or post office.

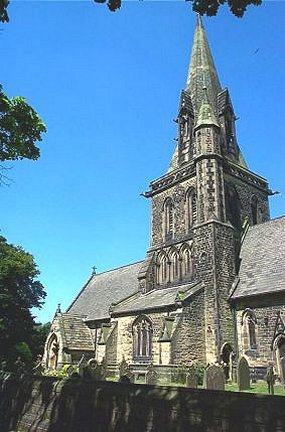
The church of St Barnabas

St Barnabas' Church, Weeton is the Anglican parish church. The architect was the leading Victorian Gothic Revivalist, George Gilbert Scott (designer of the Albert Memorial) and it was funded by the Earl of Harewood. The foundation stone was laid in 1851 by the Bishop of Ripon and construction was completed in 1852. The nearby parsonage was built in 1853. The first three vicars were the Rev. James Palmes, the Rev. T. H. Fearon and, from 1867, the Rev. Christopher Wybergh.

The village is the subject of a booklet by Joan Coombs.

To the south-east of Weeton, but in the neighbouring parish of Kirkby Overblow, Rougemont Castle is an example of a well-preserved ringwork, located above the north bank of the River Wharfe, where the river turns in a right-angle at its confluence with Weeton Beck.

== See also ==
- Listed buildings in Weeton, North Yorkshire
