= Harewood Bridge =

Bridge over the River Wharfe, England

Coordinates: 53.9099°N 1.5263°W

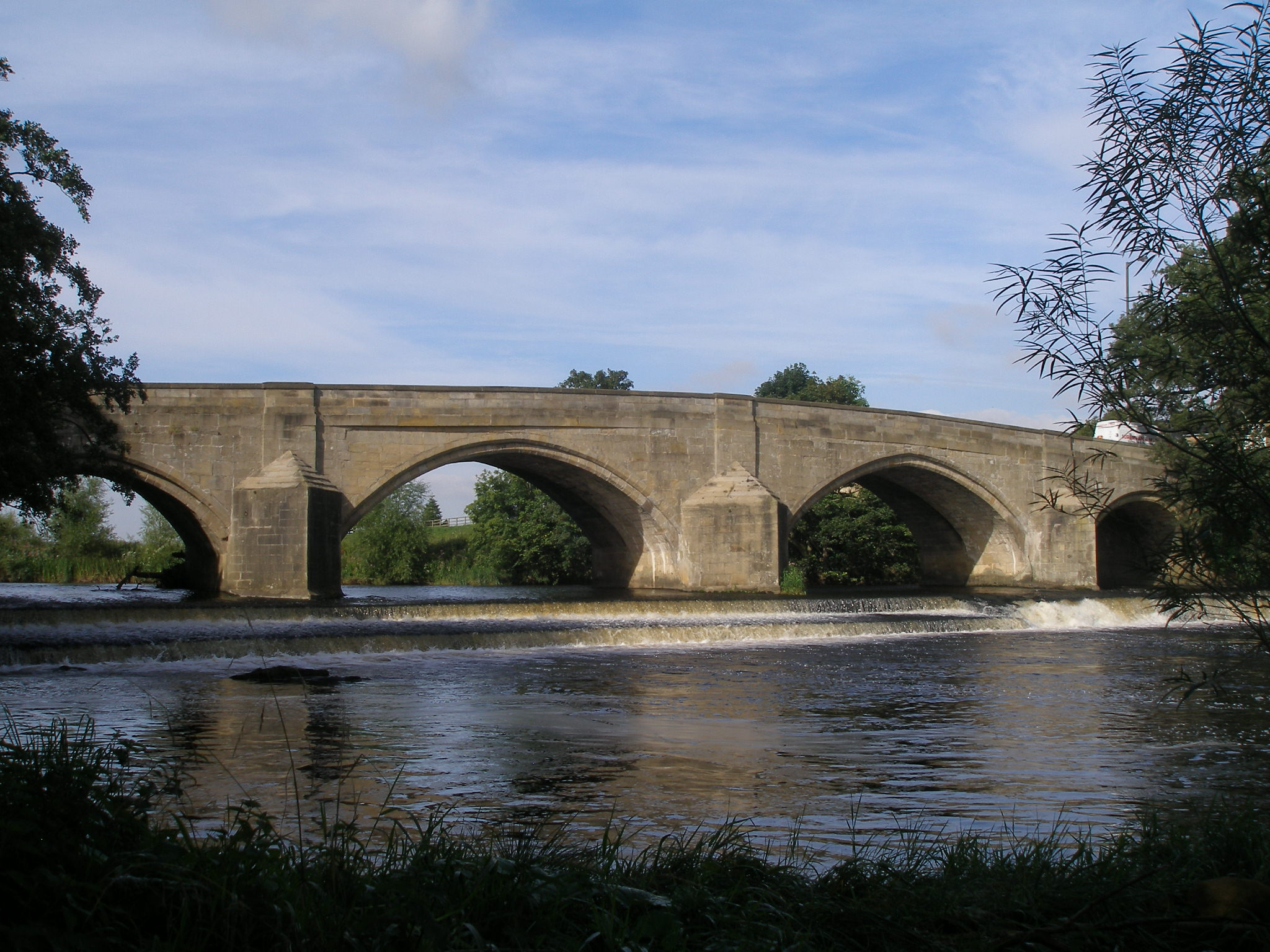
The bridge, in 2012

Harewood Bridge is a historic bridge across the River Wharfe, connecting North Yorkshire and West Yorkshire, in England.

The bridge was constructed in 1729, replacing an older structure. In 1771, it was widened by John Carr. It was grade II* listed in 1952. It closed for repairs for a month in 2023, at which time it carried 17,000 vehicles a day. The road across it forms part of the A61.

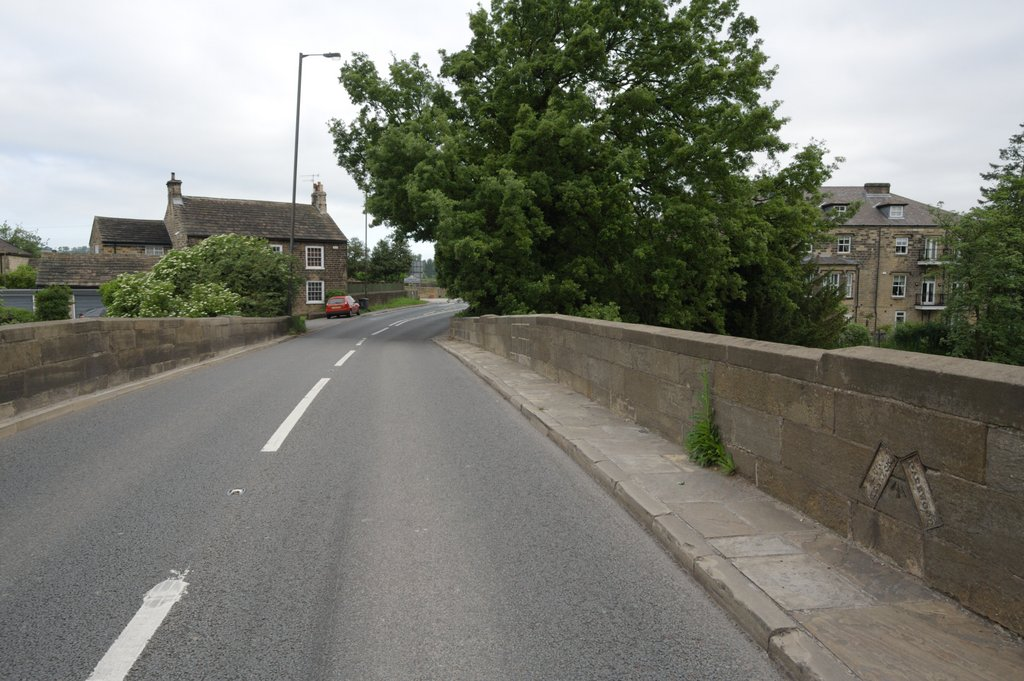
Deck of the bridge, looking north

The bridge is built of stone and consists of four segmental arches that have pointed cutwaters with angled caps. On the east side are chamfered voussoirs with two orders, and the west side has unchamfered voussoirs. The abutments splay out at each end, and on the bridge are inscribed metal plaques, giving the names of the former parish of Dunkeswick in North Yorkshire, and current parish of Harewood, West Yorkshire.

== See also ==
- Grade II* listed buildings in Leeds
- Grade II* listed buildings in North Yorkshire (district)
- Listed buildings in Harewood, West Yorkshire
- Listed buildings in Kirkby Overblow
