= Listed buildings in Kearby with Netherby =

Kearby with Netherby is a civil parish in the county of North Yorkshire, England. It contains three listed buildings that are recorded in the National Heritage List for England. All the listed buildings are designated at Grade II, the lowest of the three grades, which is applied to "buildings of national importance and special interest". The parish contains the villages of Netherby and Kearby and the surrounding countryside, and the listed buildings consist of houses and a barn.

== Buildings ==
Name and location	Photograph	Date	Notes
Barrowby Grange; 53.92513°N 1.49257°W	—	17th century	The house is in stone, and has a stone slate roof with stone coping. There are two storeys and an L-shaped plan, consisting of a range of two bays and a two-bay wing at right angles. On the main range is an embattled porch and a doorway with a plain surround. Most of the windows are mullioned. In the left gable end is a doorway in the upper floor, and the remains of external steps.
Spring Close Farm; 53.91676°N 1.47367°W	—	17th century	The house is in sandstone, originally with a timber framed core, with large quoins, and a stone slate roof with stone copings and shaped kneelers. There are two storeys and five bays. On the front is a two-storey porch and French windows, and the other windows are a mix of sashes and casements.
Barn west of Barrowby Grange; 53.92511°N 1.49298°W	—	Late 17th to early 18th century	The barn is in gritstone on a stone plinth, and it has a stone slate roof. There are five bays and a north aisle. The barn contains opposing cart entrances, that on the north with a gabled porch, doorways, and small vents.
