= Kearby with Netherby =

Civil parish in North Yorkshire, England

Coordinates: 53.924°N 1.488°W

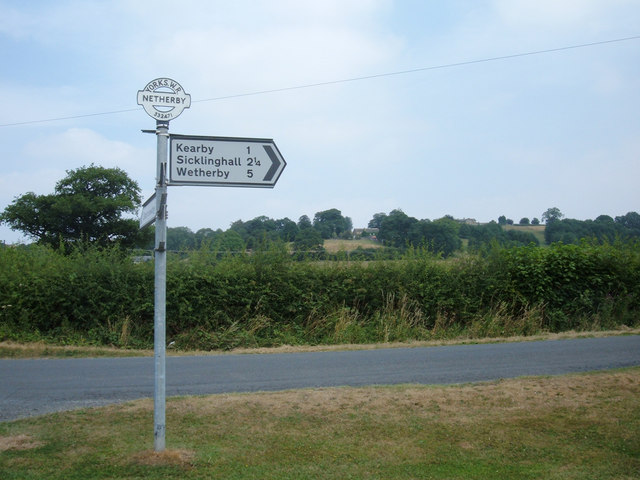
- An image of Kearby with Netherby

- Location within North Yorkshire
- Population: 204 (2011 census)
- Civil parish: Kearby with Netherby
- Unitary authority: North Yorkshire
- Ceremonial county: North Yorkshire
- Region: Yorkshire and the Humber
- Country: England
- Sovereign state: United Kingdom

Kearby with Netherby is a civil parish in North Yorkshire, England. The parish includes the hamlets of Barrowby, Netherby and Kearby Town End. The parish had a population of 204 in the 2011 census.

== History ==
Kearby with Netherby was historically a township in the parish of Kirkby Overblow in the West Riding of Yorkshire. It became a separate civil parish in 1866. It was transferred to the new county of North Yorkshire in 1974. From 1974 to 2023 it was part of the Borough of Harrogate, it is now administered by the unitary North Yorkshire Council.

Kearby was mentioned in the Domesday Book in 1086, as Cherebi. The name probably derives from Kærer, an Old Danish personal name. Barrowby is also mentioned, as Berghebi. Its name meaning farmstead on the hill.

Around 1162, William de Percy II, the son of Alan de Percy, feudal baron of Topcliffe confirmed the grants of land belonging to several tenants in Barrowby to the Cistercian monks who had founded Sawley Abbey. The monks developed a grange here and continued to expand their landholding in the local area.

== See also ==
- Listed buildings in Kearby with Netherby
