= Listed buildings in Stainburn, North Yorkshire =

Stainburn is a civil parish in the county of North Yorkshire, England. It contains eight listed buildings that are recorded in the National Heritage List for England. Of these, one is listed at Grade I, the highest of the three grades, and the others are at Grade II, the lowest grade. The parish contains the village of Stainburn and the surrounding countryside. The listed buildings consist of a church, five boundary stones and two mileposts.

== Key ==
Grade	Criteria
I	Buildings of exceptional interest, sometimes considered to be internationally important
II	Buildings of national importance and special interest

== Buildings ==
Name and location	Photograph	Date	Notes	Grade
St Mary's Church; 53.93246°N 1.62461°W		12th century	The church has been altered and extended through the centuries, including alterations and a restoration in 1894 by C. Hodgson Fowler, and it is now redundant. It is built in gritstone with a stone slate roof, and consists of a nave, a south porch, and a chancel with a north vestry. At the junction of the nave and the chancel is a two-arched bellcote. The porch has a round arch, and a hood mould with human head terminals, and the inner doorway has a plain tympanum. The three-light east window is in Perpendicular style.	I
Boundary stone at SE2588547338; 53.92159°N 1.60734°W		Mid to late 18th century	The boundary stone at Gravelly Hill is in gritstone, it is about 80 centimetres (31 in) in height, and has a flat top. On the north side is inscribed "T.F." and on the south side "E.L.".	II
Boundary stone at SE2695048740; 53.93413°N 1.59100°W	—	Mid to late 18th century	The boundary stone is set into a drystone wall near Green Acres. It is in gritstone and about 60 centimetres (24 in) in height. On the west side is inscribed "T F" and on the east side "E L".	II
Boundary stone at SE2663947924; 53.92675°N 1.59586°W	—	Mid to late 18th century	The boundary stone is in a hedge line near Merrybank Lane. It is in gritstone and about 80 centimetres (31 in) in height, and has tipped over so that only the inscription "T.F." is visible.	II
Boundary stone at SE2642247574; 53.92365°N 1.59912°W	—	Mid to late 18th century	The boundary stone is in a former hedge line about 50 metres (160 ft) north of Newby Farm Road. It is in gritstone, it is about 80 centimetres (31 in) in height, and has a flat top. On the north side is inscribed "T.F." and on the south side "E.L.".	II
Boundary stone at SE2645747597; 53.92389°N 1.59858°W	—	Mid to late 18th century	The boundary stone is in a former hedge line about 80 metres (260 ft) north of Newby Farm Road. It is in gritstone, it is about 80 centimetres (31 in) in length, having been tipped over. Only the inscription "E.L." is visible.	II
Milepost; 53.94151°N 1.63819°W		19th century	The milepost on the south side of the B6161 road is in gritstone with a cast iron plate. It has a triangular section and a round head. On the head is inscribed "Dudleyhill Killinghall & Harrogate Road" and "Stainburn", On the left face is the distance to Bradford and on the right face to Killinghall.	II
Milepost at Moorside Bridge; 53.94398°N 1.63183°W		19th century	The milepost on the north side of the B6161 road is in gritstone with a cast iron plate. It has a triangular section and a round head. On the head is inscribed "Dudleyhill Killinghall & Harrogate Road" and "Stainburn", On the right face is the distance to Bradford and on the left face to Killinghall.	II
