= North Rigton =

Village and civil parish in North Yorkshire, England

Coordinates: 53.9385°N 1.5747°W

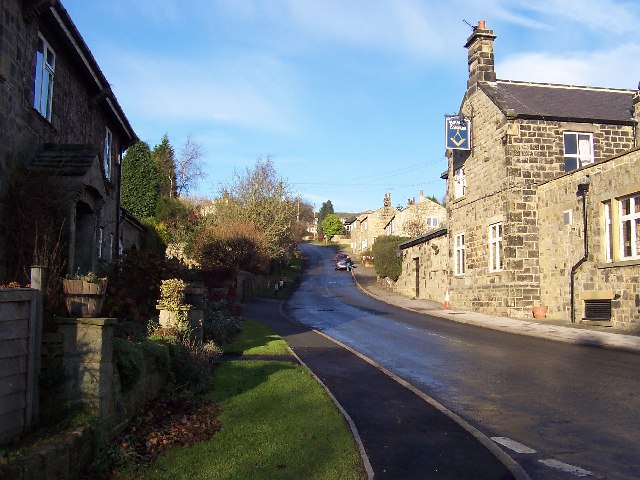
- North Rigton

- Location within North Yorkshire
- Population: 460
- OS grid reference: SE279492
- Unitary authority: North Yorkshire
- Ceremonial county: North Yorkshire
- Region: Yorkshire and the Humber
- Country: England
- Sovereign state: United Kingdom
- Post town: LEEDS
- Postcode district: LS17
- Dialling code: 01423
- Police: North Yorkshire
- Fire: North Yorkshire
- Ambulance: Yorkshire
- UK Parliament: Skipton and Ripon

North Rigton is a village and civil parish in the county of North Yorkshire, England. It is 2 miles (3 km) south of Harrogate. The population of the parish was 460 in 2011. Almscliffe Crag adjacent to the village was used for scenery at the end of Yorkshire Television dramas, The Beiderbecke Affair, The Beiderbecke Tapes and The Beiderbecke Connection. The area was never referred to by name.

Until the 19th century the village was known as Rigton, the official name of the parish until 1962. "North" was added to distinguish the place from East Rigton, 7 miles (11 km) southeast. The name is from the Old English hrycg and tūn, meaning "farmstead on the ridge". The place was mentioned in the Domesday Book as Riston, an Anglo-Norman spelling of the name.

The village was historically a township in the parish of Kirkby Overblow, in the West Riding of Yorkshire. It became a separate civil parish in 1866, and was transferred to the new county of North Yorkshire in 1974. From 1974 to 2023 it was part of the Borough of Harrogate, it is now administered by the unitary North Yorkshire Council.

== See also ==
- Listed buildings in North Rigton
