= Almscliffe Crag =

Rock outcrop in North Yorkshire, England

Coordinates: 53.9365°N 1.5931°W

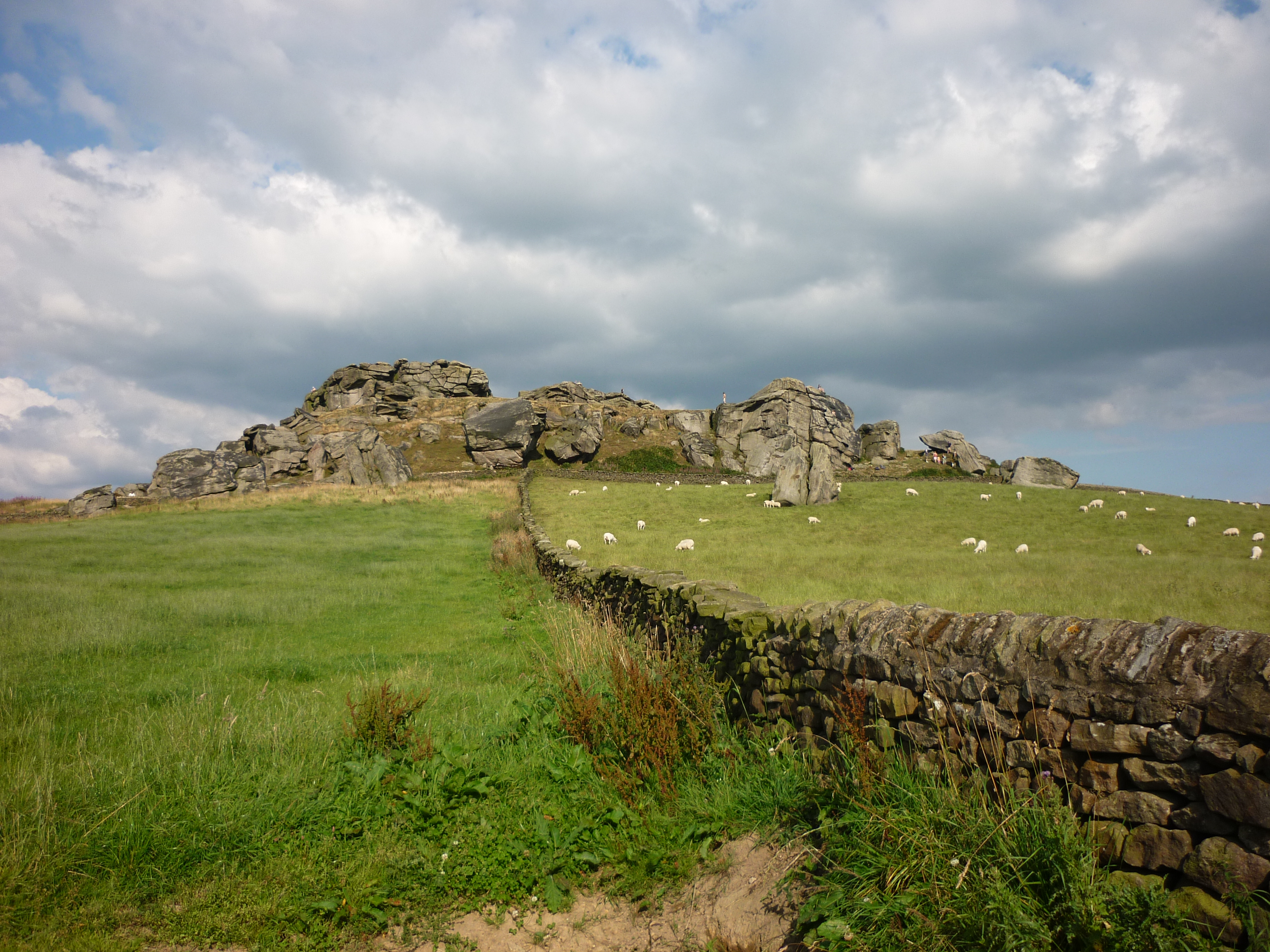
Almscliffe Crag

Almscliffe Crag, or Almscliff Crag, also known as Great Almscliff Crag to distinguish it from Little Almscliff, 3 miles (5 km) north west, is a Millstone Grit outcrop at the top of a small hill near the village of North Rigton, between Leeds and Harrogate in North Yorkshire, England. The crag lies on the boundary of the civil parishes of North Rigton and Stainburn. The crag was formed due to the softer adjacent strata of shale and mudstone eroding at a faster rate than the hard wearing millstone.

The crag is a Site of Special Scientific Interest.

== Rock climbing ==
The crag is one of the best climbing locations in the area. The crag was featured in the first rock climbing guide to the Peak District, 'Some Gritstone Climbs', published in 1913 and written by John Laycock. Some classic climbs include Parsons' Chimney (HS 4b), Black Wall Eliminate (E2 5c), and Wall of Horrors (E3 5c). It is also a popular destination for walkers.

== As a film location ==
Almscliffe Crag has proved popular as a filming location for Yorkshire Television. From 1998 to 2005 it appeared in the opening titles of the ITV soap Emmerdale. Each series of The Beiderbecke Trilogy ends at Almscliffe Crag. An earlier TV appearance was as the planet Obsidian in 'Volcano' in Episode 3 of Series 3 of the BBC Sci fi series Blake's 7 which aired in 1980.

== Folklore ==
Almscliffe Crag has been especially associated with fairies and changelings. A local family named Bradley had three changed children in their family in the early nineteenth century.

== Name ==
The name was first recorded in the early 13th century in the form Almusclyve. According to one source the name appears to come from a female personal name Almus: although that name is not recorded, it is similar to Middle English female names ending in -us recorded from Yorkshire. Another theory links the name to the Celtic al "fire" and mias "altar". In a tourist's companion book from 1826, the name is recorded as Almias Cliff.

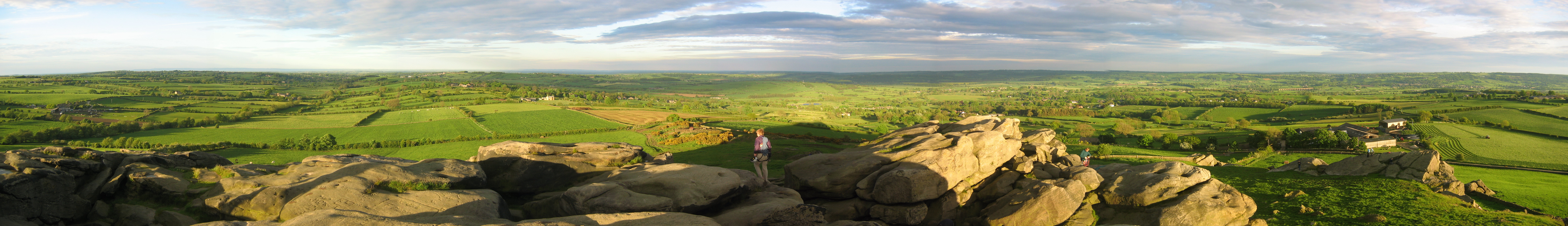
