= Stainburn, North Yorkshire =

Village and civil parish in North Yorkshire, England

Coordinates: 53.93°N 1.62°W

Stainburn
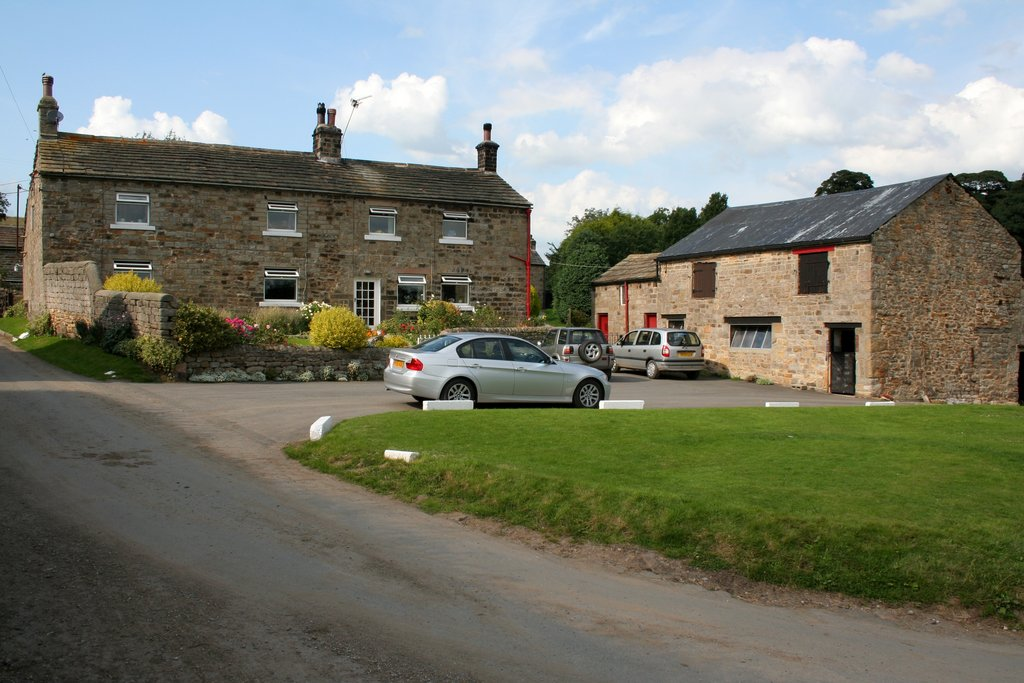

- Location within North Yorkshire
- Population: 120
- OS grid reference: SE425049448275
- Civil parish: Stainburn
- Unitary authority: North Yorkshire
- Ceremonial county: North Yorkshire
- Region: Yorkshire and the Humber
- Country: England
- Sovereign state: United Kingdom
- Post town: Otley
- Postcode district: LS21
- Police: North Yorkshire
- Fire: North Yorkshire
- Ambulance: Yorkshire

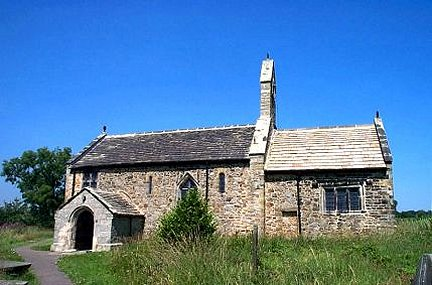
St Mary's Church, Stainburn

Stainburn is a village and civil parish in the county of North Yorkshire, England, 10 miles (16 km) north of Leeds. The population of the civil parish was estimated at 120 in 2015.

St Mary's Church is one of Stainburn's main attractions, offering fine views over Wharfedale. It is a Grade I listed building, currently being under the care of the Churches Conservation Trust.

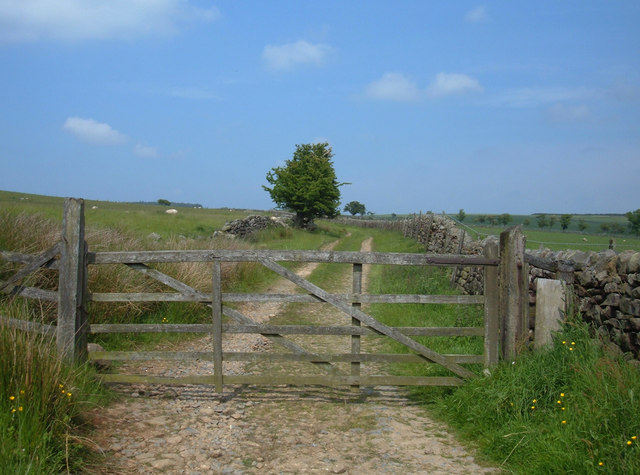
Bridleway to Stainburn Moor

== History ==
The name 'Stainburn' is derived from the Old English and means "Stone Stream", suggesting the village suffered a lack of fresh water supplies, many centuries ago.

Stainburn is recorded in the Domesday Book in 1086: "King William was the Lord of Stainburn", and the "Tenant-in-chief was also King William" "In 1066 the value to the Lord was £2 with a taxeable value of 5 geld units".

In 1848, Stainburn was a village with houses distributed all around the Norman style chapel. It consisted of:

"2900 acres of land alongside the property of F. H. Fawkes, Esq., lord of the manor. Whilst the land was considered valuable for cultivation, the tithes were introduced for land purposes within the religious organisation. Bequests (acts of giving) were implemented for the poor people of the village".

Stainburn was historically a township in the parish of Kirkby Overblow in the West Riding of Yorkshire. In the 1870s it was described as:

"a township-chapelry, with two hamlets, in Kirkby-Overblow parish, W. R. Yorkshire; near Weeton railway station, and 4 miles NE by E of Otley; where there is a parochial school".

The village was transferred to the new county of North Yorkshire in 1974. From 1974 to 2023 it was part of the Borough of Harrogate, it is now administered by the unitary North Yorkshire Council.

== Places of interest ==
The nearest schools to Stainburn are: Farnley Church of England Voluntary Aided Primary School (1.8 miles (2.9 km)), Pool-in-Wharfedale Church of England Voluntary Controlled Primary School (2.1 miles (3.4 km)) and Prince Henry's Grammar School, Otley (3 miles (4.8 km)).

Stainburn is well known for its bike trails, in particular it homes one of the newest edition of trails: Descent Line Trail in Yorkshire and the Humber for experienced mountain bikers covering a short distance of 1.5 km (0.93 mi). Not to mention, it occupies some of the most intricate trails such as: the black-graded 4 km (2.5 mi) Warren Boulder Trail and the 2 km (1.2 mi) Red Loop Trail.

Within the parish of Stainburn, there is a forest which is positioned near to Harrogate and Otley. It is "a largely coniferous woodland on the edge of Nidderdale AONB which consists of two parts... a mixed pine, larch and spruce area on the sloping ground of Norwood Edge and... a plateau of spruce... of scots pine and larch to the east".

Stainburn Moor, situated 2 miles (3 km) from Bland Hill, has a car park used by walkers and mountain bikers, and also visitors to the village of Stainburn.

== St Mary's Church ==
The church has 12th-century origins and was restored in 1894. It began as a chapel of ease to nearby Kirkby Overblow, and consequently was given to Fountains Abbey in the middle of the 12th century.

It is a Grade I listed building. After being declared redundant, the church was transferred into the care of the Churches Conservation Trust, who describe it as:

"A Norman church... which has grown out of the harsh land on which it stands. Except for a porch, bell-cote and vestry, its original Norman shape and many original features are retained. The splendid chancel arch, some of the windows and well-carved font are all Norman; the roof is late medieval and the robust oak pews are from about 1600".

== See also ==
- Listed buildings in Stainburn, North Yorkshire
