= Listed buildings in North Rigton =

North Rigton is a civil parish in the county of North Yorkshire, England. It contains seven listed buildings that are recorded in the National Heritage List for England. All the listed buildings are designated at Grade II, the lowest of the three grades, which is applied to "buildings of national importance and special interest". The parish contains the village of North Rigton and the surrounding countryside. The listed buildings consist of houses and associated structures, a set of stocks, and two boundary stones.

== Buildings ==
Name and location	Photograph	Date	Notes
Tatefield Hall; 53.96176°N 1.58287°W		16th century	A house in stone with a stone slate roof. There are two storeys and two bays. There are doorways in the garden front and in the right return. Most of the windows are mullioned, and in the right gable end is an oval window with a twisted-rope surround, and above it is a sundial.
Sycamore Farmhouse; 53.94004°N 1.57722°W	—	1619	The house is in gritstone, and has a stone slate roof with stone coping and shaped kneelers. There are two storeys and four bays. The doorway has a lintel with a shallow pointed arch, and to its left is a French window. The windows vary; some are mullioned, some mullions have been removed, and others are sashes.
Outbuilding south of Tatefield Hall; 53.96165°N 1.58311°W	—	17th century	The outbuilding is in gritstone, with quoins, and a stone slate roof with stone coping, shaped kneelers and ball finials. There are two storeys and four bays. It contains a doorway and a fire window, the other windows are mullioned, and there are external stone steps.
Stocks; 53.93876°N 1.57426°W		17th century (possible)	The stocks consist of a pair of gritstone posts about 1 metre (3 ft 3 in) tall, grooved on the inner faces. Between them are two wooden boards with holes for two pairs of legs. On one post is a brass plaque.
Barn south of Tatefield Hall; 53.96151°N 1.58321°W	—	18th century	The barn is in gritstone, with quoins, and a stone slate roof with stone coping, shaped kneelers and ball finials. It contains double doors under a flat arch of voussoirs, and vents, and on the roof is an elaborate wrought iron weathervane.
Boundary stone in field wall 53.93490°N 1.59144°W	—	Mid to late 18th century	The boundary stone is in gritstone, it is about 30 centimetres (12 in) wide and 80 centimetres (31 in) tall, and is built into a dry stone wall. The stone is inscribed with initials.
Boundary stone at NGR SE 300508; 53.95218°N 1.54384°W		1767	The boundary marker is in stone and has a rounded head. It is inscribed with initials and the date.
