= St Barnabas' Church, Weeton =

Church in Weeton, North Yorkshire, England

Coordinates: 53.9176°N 1.5659°W

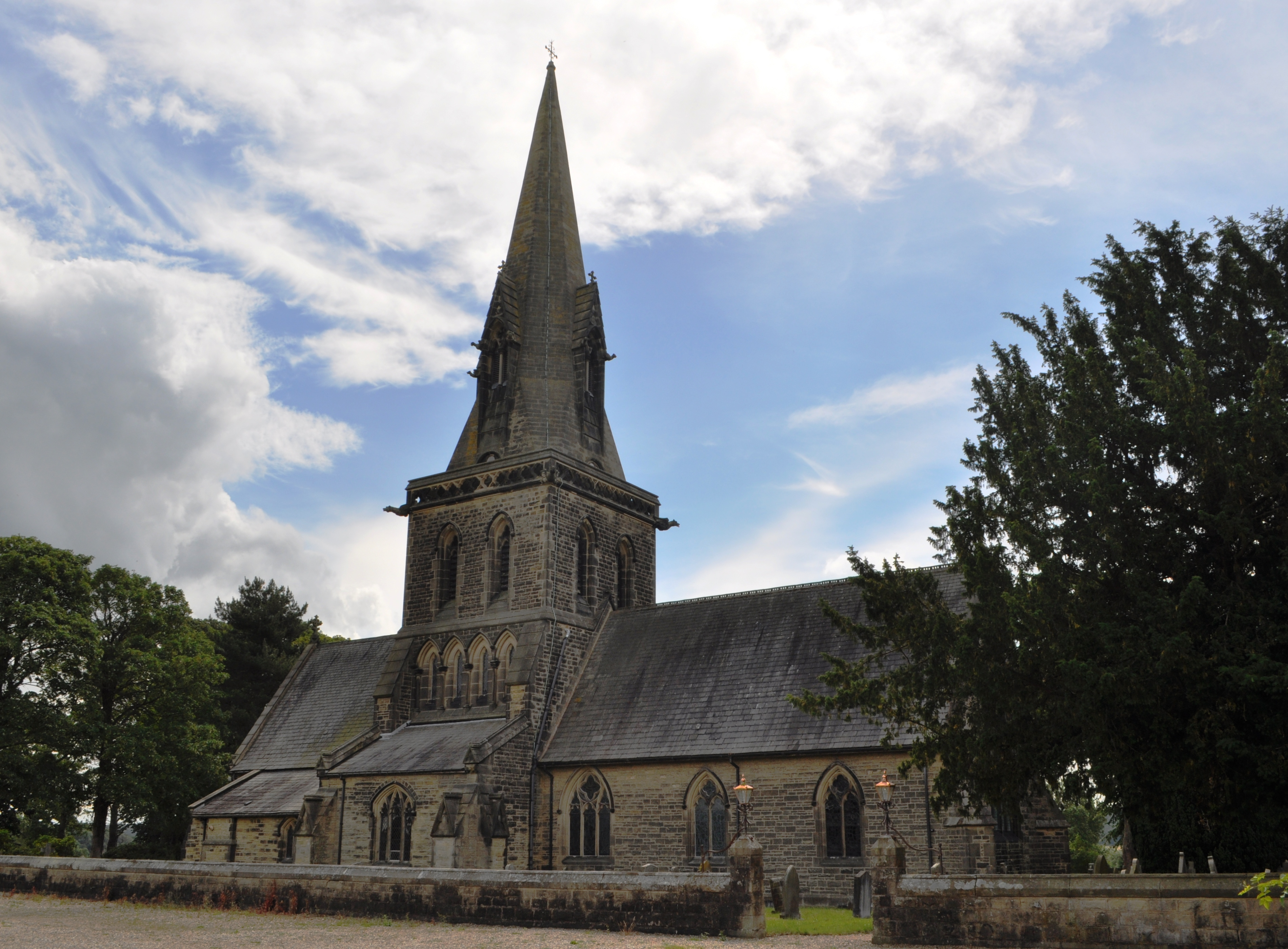
The church, in 2023

St Barnabas' Church is the parish church of Weeton, North Yorkshire, a village in England.

The church was built between 1851 and 1852, to an Early English Gothic design by George Gilbert Scott. Scott also designed a vicarage, which was completed in 1853, and the whole complex was funded by Henry Lascelles, 3rd Earl of Harewood. Stained glass was inserted in the east window in 1855. Harry Speight described the church as "one of the handsomest modern churches to be found in the West Riding dales". The building was grade II* listed in 1966.

The church is built of gritstone with a Westmorland slate roof. It has a cruciform plan, and consists of a nave, a south porch, shallow north and south transepts, a chancel with a northeast vestry, and a steeple at the crossing. The steeple has an octagonal southeast stair turret with a spire, a tower with an arcade of small lancet windows, above which are two bell openings on each side, a pierced parapet with gargoyles, and a broach spire with large lucarnes. Inside there is a stone font with a tall wooden cover, and elaborate brass candelabra and wall brackets.

== See also ==
- Grade II* listed churches in North Yorkshire (district)
- Listed buildings in Weeton, North Yorkshire
