= Listed buildings in Weeton, North Yorkshire =

Weeton is a civil parish in the county of North Yorkshire, England. It contains seven listed buildings that are recorded in the National Heritage List for England. Of these, one is listed at Grade II*, the middle of the three grades, and the others are at Grade II, the lowest grade. The parish contains the village of Weeton and the surrounding countryside. The listed buildings consist of a church and its former vicarage, two houses, a sign post, a boundary stone, and a milepost.

== Key ==
Grade	Criteria
II*	Particularly important buildings of more than special interest
II	Buildings of national importance and special interest

== Buildings ==
Name and location	Photograph	Date	Notes	Grade
Old Hall and outbuilding 53.91766°N 1.56605°W	—	Late 17th century	The house and the former barn to the right, partly incorporated into the house and partly an outbuilding, are in stone and have a stone slate roof with shaped kneelers and stone coping. There are two storeys, and the house has three bays and a string course. The doorway has a round-arched head, pilasters on plinths, and an entablature. Above the doorway is a square window with a chamfered surround, and the other windows have two lights, mullions, and horizontally sliding sashes. The extra bay to the right contains a bay window on the ground floor, and 20th-century windows above.	II
Sign post 53.91796°N 1.59387°W		1743	The signpost is in gritstone, it has a square section, and is about1.2 metres (3 ft 11 in) in height. On three sides are pointing hands, on the east face is the direction to Bradford and the date, on the north face is the direction to Otley, and on the west, to Knaresborough.	II
Hollins Farm; 53.91698°N 1.56797°W	—	Late 18th century	The house is in gritstone, and has a stone slate roof with shaped kneelers and stone coping. There are two storeys and two bays. The central doorway has a plain surround, and the windows are mullioned, with three lights.	II
Boundary stone 53.92872°N 1.58012°W		19th century	The boundary stone, by a road junction, is in gritstone. It has a triangular plan, it is about 60 centimetres (24 in) in height, and on the top are the initials "B S". On each side is a cast iron plate; the left plate is inscribed "RIGTON" and the right face has "WEETON".	II
Milepost; 53.92524°N 1.58184°W		19th century	The milepost on the west side of the A658 road is in gritstone with a cast iron plate. It has a trangular plan and a rounded top, and is about 80 centimetres (31 in) in height. On teh top is inscribed "Dudleyhill Killinghall and Harrogate Road", and "Weeton".	II
St Barnabas' Church; 53.91397°N 1.56948°W		1851–52	The church was designed by George Gilbert Scott, and is built in gritstone with a Westmorland slate roof. It has a cruciform plan, and consists of a nave, a south porch, shallow north and south transepts, a chancel with a northeast vestry, and a steeple at the crossing. The steeple has an octagonal southeast stair turret with a spire, a tower with an arcade of small lancet windows, above which are two bell openings on each side, a pierced parapet with gargoyles, and a broach spire with large lucarnes.	II*
The Old Vicarage, stables and coach house 53.91350°N 1.56975°W		c.1855	The house is in gritstone, with quoins, a moulded string course, and a Westmorland slate roof with many coped gables and crocketed finials. There are two storeys and an attic, three bays, and a projecting three-bay wing on the right. On the front is a two-storey porch with buttresses, and a doorway with a pointed arch, and the windows on the front have trefoil-headed lights. The garden front has a central doorway with a pointed head, to its left, the bay projects and contains a mullioned and transomed window. To the right is a bay window, and the upper floor contains mullioned windows. A courtyard is attached to the left of the house and contains a coach house, stables, and a fuel store, and has a retaining wall and double gates.	II
