= James Palmes =

James Palmes (1826–1898) was the Archdeacon of the East Riding from 1892 until his death.

Palmes was educated at University College, Durham and ordained in 1850. After a curacy in Leeds he held incumbencies at Weeton and Escrick.

He died on 3 June 1898.

Church of England titles
Preceded by Richard Blunt	Archdeacon of the East Riding; 1892–1898	Succeeded by Charles Mackarness
