= All Saints' Church, Kirkby Overblow =

Church in North Yorkshire, England

Coordinates: 53°56′17″N 1°30′25″W

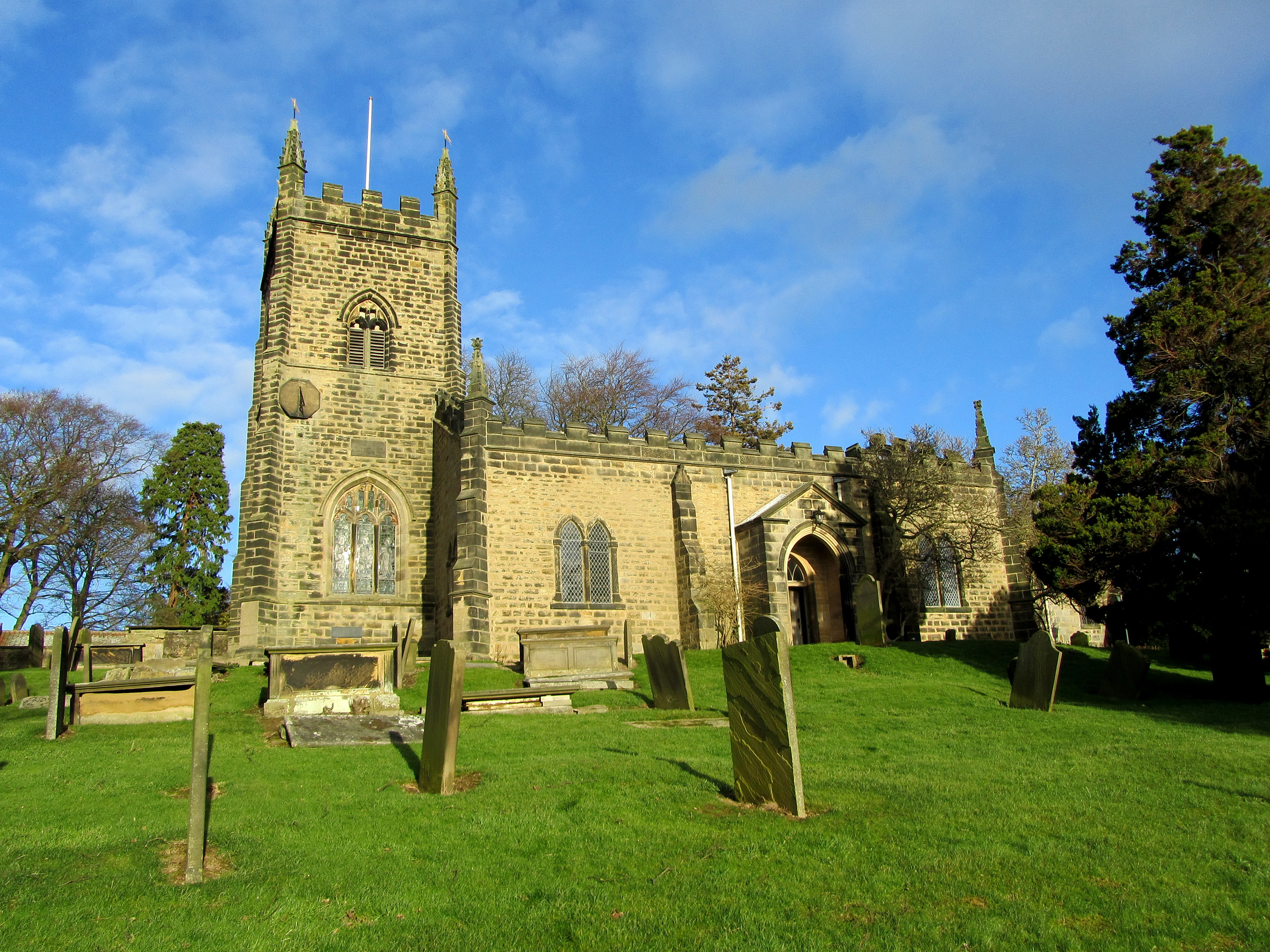
The church, in 2014

All Saints' Church is the parish church of Kirkby Overblow, a village in North Yorkshire, in England.

The oldest part of the church is the north doorway, which is probably 11th century, while the north transept is 14th century. It became a collegiate church in 1362, enabling the rector to become known as a provost. The church was almost entirely rebuilt between 1780 and 1781, and in 1848, it was described as a "a spacious and venerable structure". It was restored in 1872 by G. E. Street, and was grade II listed in 1966.

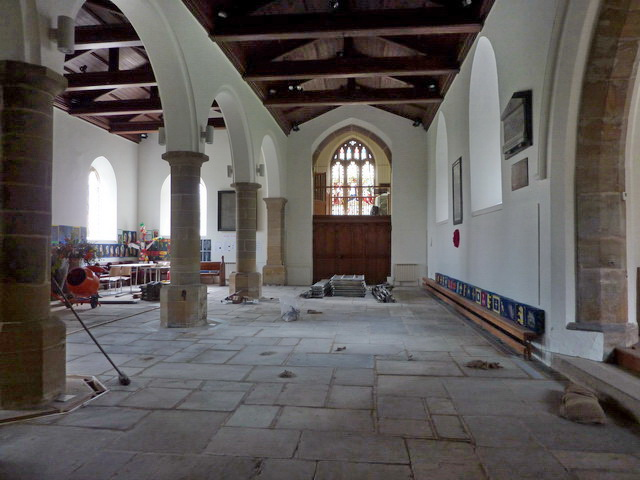
The interior, in 2010

The church is built of gritstone with a stone slate roof, and consists of a nave, a south aisle, a south porch, a north transept, a chancel and a west tower. The tower has three stages, diagonal buttresses, Perpendicular windows, a sundial, a west clock face, two-light bell openings with hood moulds, and an embattled parapet with crocketed corner pinnacles. There are also embattled parapets on the body of the church.

== See also ==
- Listed buildings in Kirkby Overblow
