= Kirkby Overblow =

Village and civil parish in North Yorkshire, England

Coordinates: 53°56′16″N 1°30′20″W

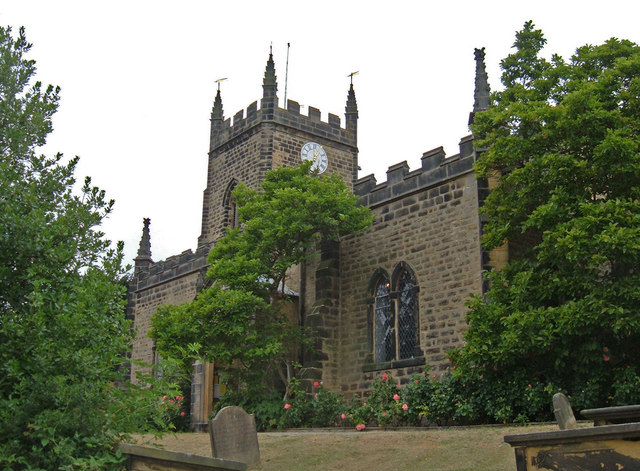
- All Saints Church

- Location within North Yorkshire
- Population: 462 (2011 census)
- OS grid reference: SE325492
- Civil parish: Kirkby Overblow
- Unitary authority: North Yorkshire
- Ceremonial county: North Yorkshire
- Region: Yorkshire and the Humber
- Country: England
- Sovereign state: United Kingdom
- Post town: HARROGATE
- Postcode district: HG3
- Dialling code: 01423
- UK Parliament: Wetherby and Easingwold

Kirkby Overblow is a village and civil parish in North Yorkshire, England. It is situated between Wetherby and Harrogate and lies to the west of Sicklinghall and the east of Leeds Bradford Airport. Its parish church is All Saints' Church, Kirkby Overblow, with an associated Church of England primary school affiliated with the church.

In January 2023, The Daily Telegraph, based on research by Savills, listed Kirkby Overblow as one of Britain's "54 poshest villages".

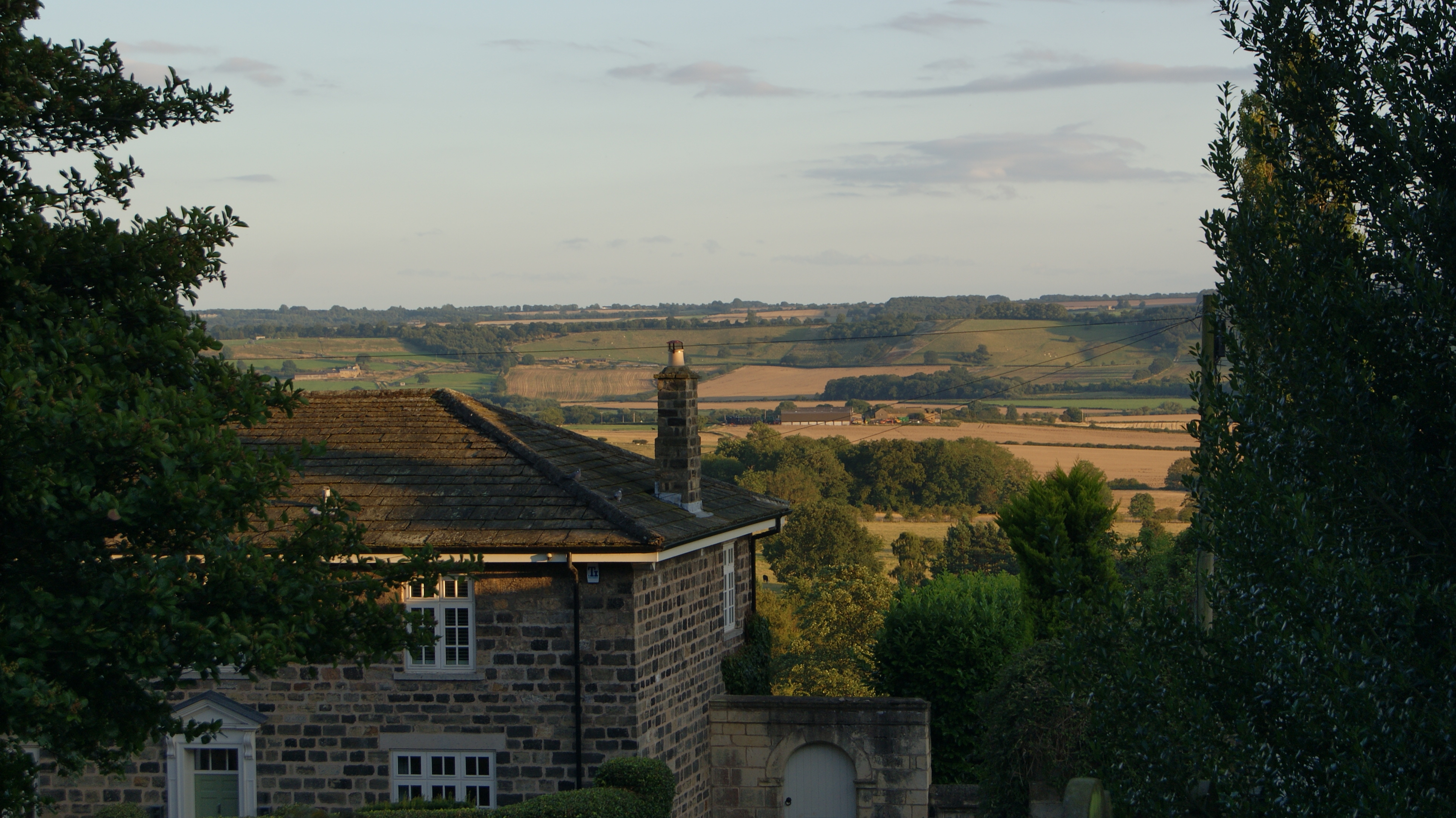
The village is situated to the north of the lower Wharfe valley.

The parish includes the hamlet of Dunkeswick, some 2 miles (3 km) south west of the village.

== History ==
The first written reference to Kirkby Overblow appears in the Domesday Book, where it appears as Cherchebi. The Kirkby part of the name is a common prefix, simply meaning a settlement by a church, while Overblow is a corruption of Oreblow, a reference to the village's iron-smelting past.

Kirkby Overblow was a large ancient parish, which included the townships of Kearby with Netherby (including the hamlets of Kearby and Netherby), Rigton (which later became North Rigton), Sicklinghall and Stainburn. All these places became separate civil parishes in 1866.

Until 1974 the civil parish was part of the West Riding of Yorkshire. In 1974 it was transferred to the Borough of Harrogate in the new county of North Yorkshire. In 1992 it was enlarged by the transfer of Dunkeswick from Harewood in West Yorkshire to North Yorkshire. In 2023 the Borough of Harrogate was abolished. The parish is now administered by the unitary North Yorkshire Council.

== Facilities ==
Kirkby Overblow has a bus stop, but no railway station or post office. There are two pubs in the village, the Shoulder of Mutton, which boasts a large beer garden, and the Star and Garter which has since shutdown:

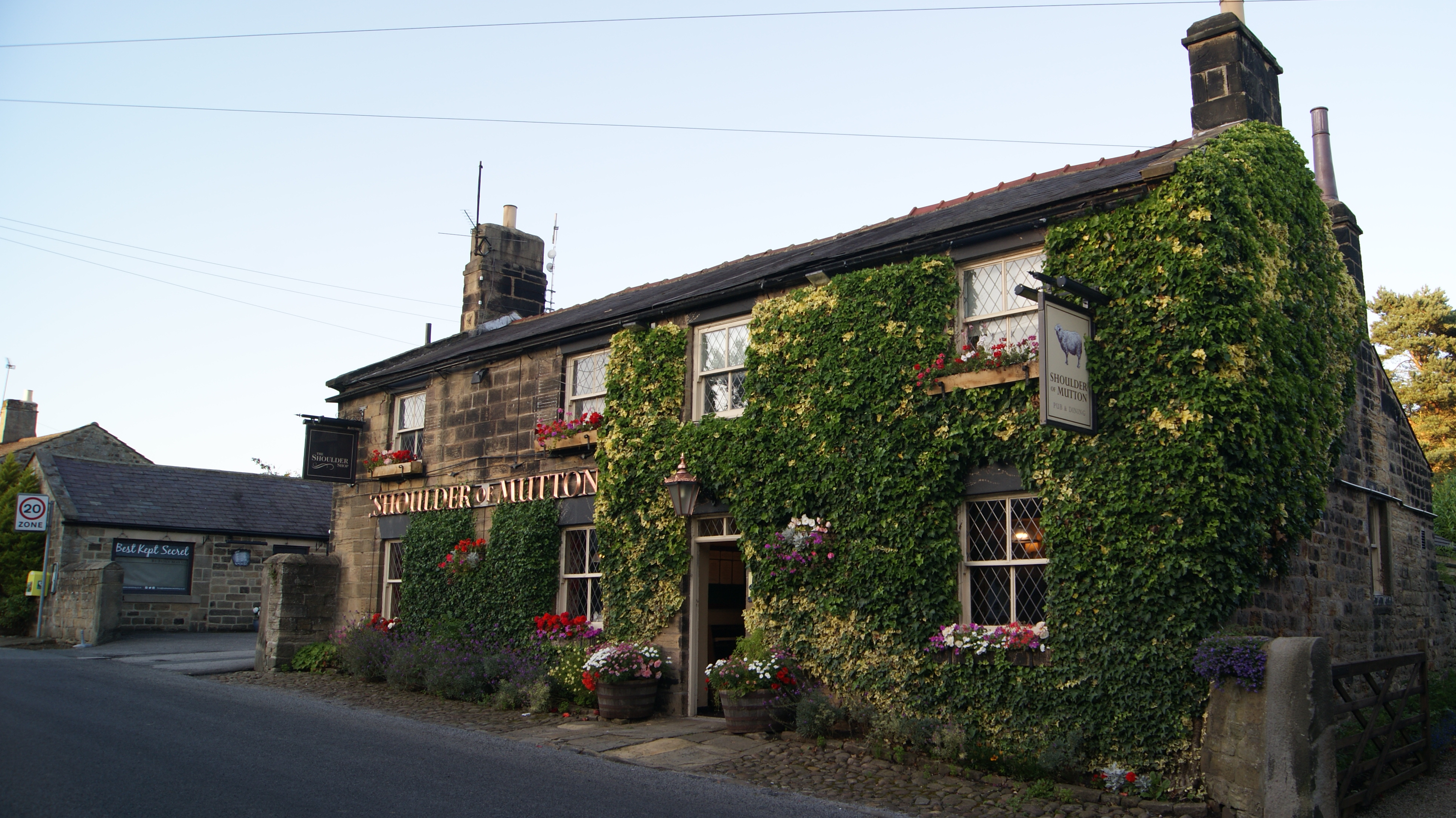
Shoulder of Mutton

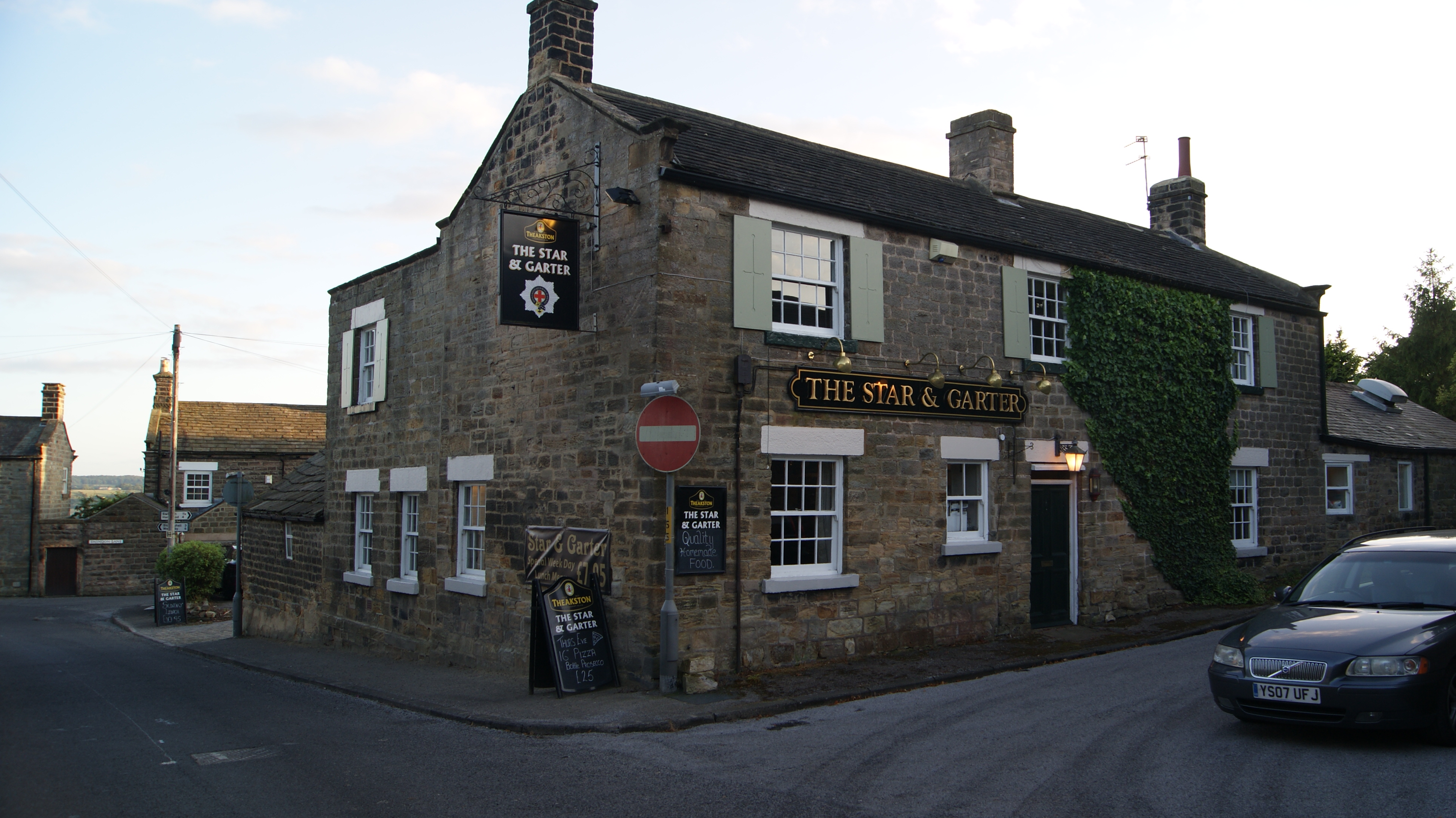
The Star and Garter

== Climate ==
Climate in this area has mild differences between highs and lows, and there is adequate rainfall year-round. The Köppen Climate Classification subtype for this climate is "Cfb" (Marine West Coast Climate/Oceanic climate).

== See also ==
- Listed buildings in Kirkby Overblow
