= Weeton railway station =

Railway station in North Yorkshire, England

Weeton
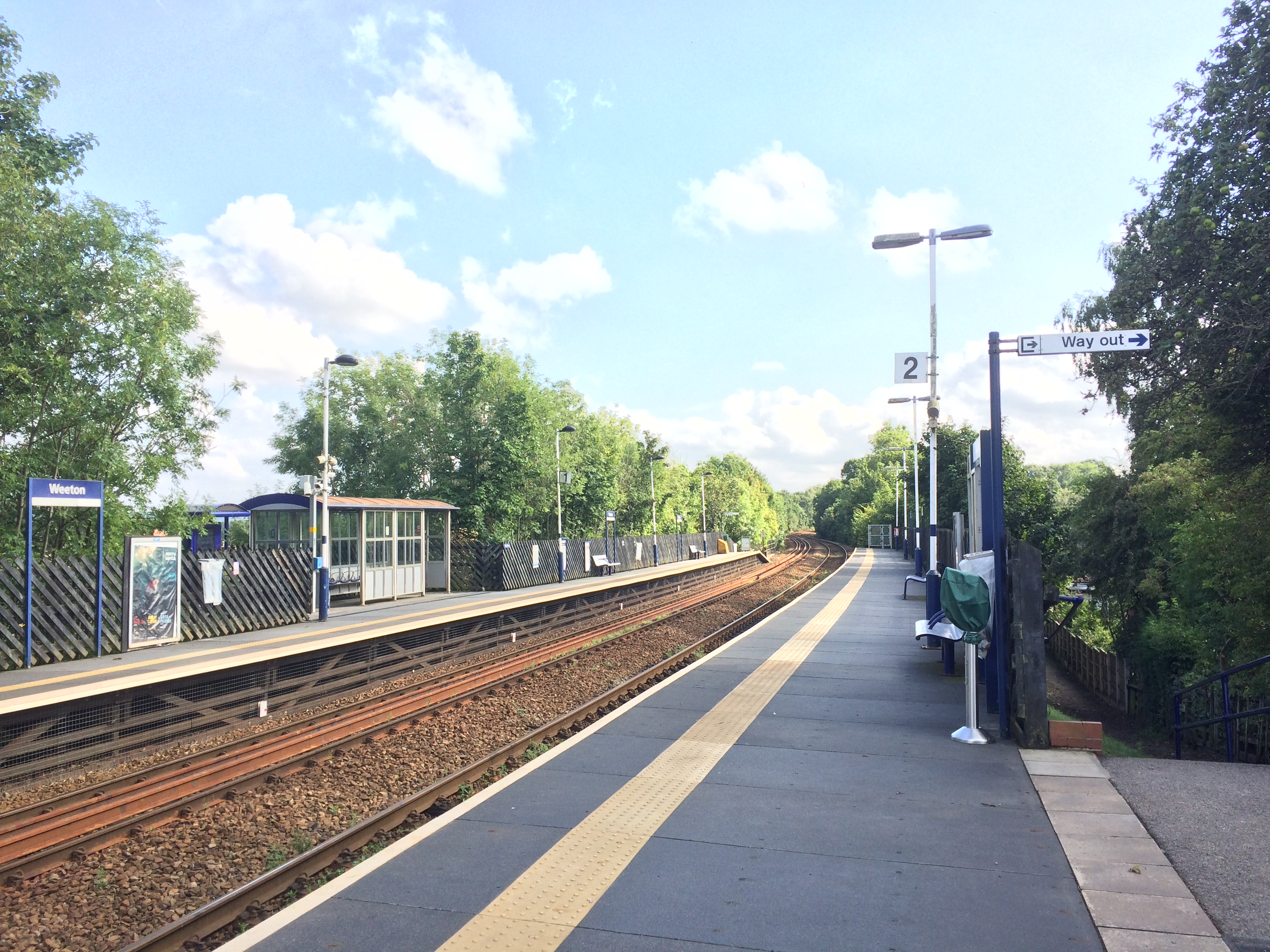
- View looking south towards Leeds

General information
- Location: Huby, North Yorkshire; England
- Coordinates: 53.9231°N 1.5813°W
- Grid reference: SE275475
- Managed by: Northern
- Transit authority: West Yorkshire (Metro)
- Platforms: 2

Other information
- Station code: WET
- Fare zone: 6
- Classification: DfT category F2

History
- Original company: Leeds and Thirsk Railway
- Pre-grouping: North Eastern Railway
- Post-grouping: London and North Eastern Railway

Key dates
- 1 September 1848: Station opened as terminus of line from Thirsk
- 9 July 1849: Line extended to Leeds

Passengers
- 2020/21: ▼15,042
- 2021/22: ▲53,158
- 2022/23: ▲59,676
- 2023/24: ▲71,474
- 2024/25: ▲94,500
Location
Notes
- Passenger statistics from the Office of Rail and Road

Weeton railway station serves the villages of Weeton and Huby in North Yorkshire, England. It is located on the Harrogate Line 11.5 miles (19 km) north of Leeds and operated by Northern Trains who provide all passenger train services.

== History ==
The Leeds and Thirsk Railway was authorised in 1845, and built in stages. The section between Wormald Green and Weeton opened on 1 September 1848. On 9 July 1849, the final section of the original L&TR main line was formally opened, between Weeton and Leeds. The station at Weeton was described as Weeton for Ormscliff Crags in some timetables.

In 1995, the building on the Harrogate-bound platform was destroyed by fire.

== Facilities ==
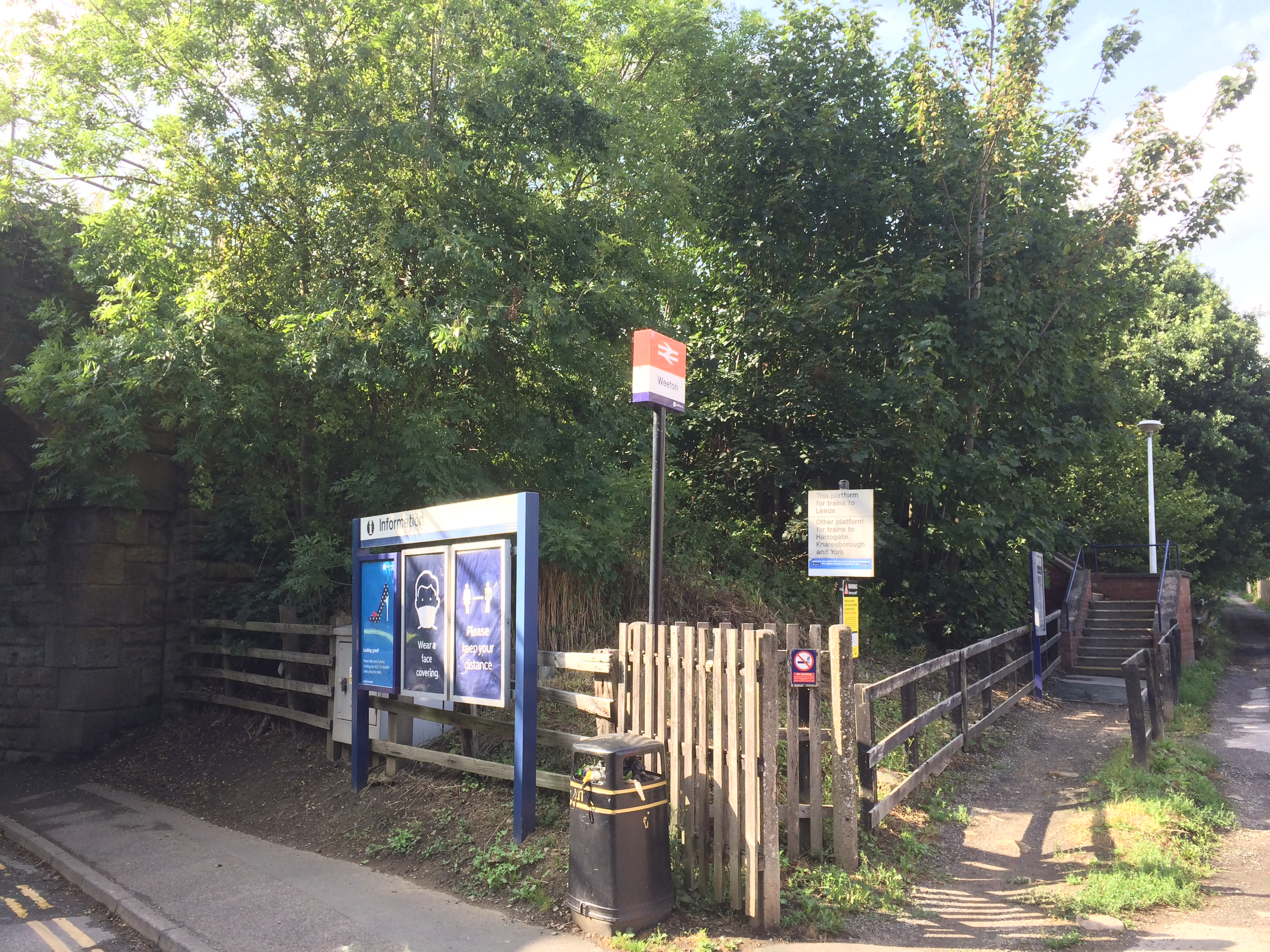
Station entrance from Weeton Lane

The station is unstaffed, but has ticket machines in place to allow intending passengers to buy prior to boarding the train. There are only basic shelters on each platform, but there are passenger information screens in place and a public address system to provide train running information. Neither platform is DDA-compliant, as the Leeds one has steps to it and access to the Harrogate one is via a steep pathway.

== Services ==
During Monday to Saturday daytimes (and from mid-morning on Sundays), there is generally a half-hourly service southbound to Leeds and a half-hourly service northbound to Knaresborough and York via Harrogate.

In the evenings, there is generally an hourly service in each direction, with some services starting/terminating at Harrogate at the beginning and end of service.

Preceding station	National Rail	Following station
Horsforth	Northern; Harrogate Line	Pannal
