= Netherby, North Yorkshire =

Village in North Yorkshire, England

Coordinates: 53.917°N 1.494°W

Netherby
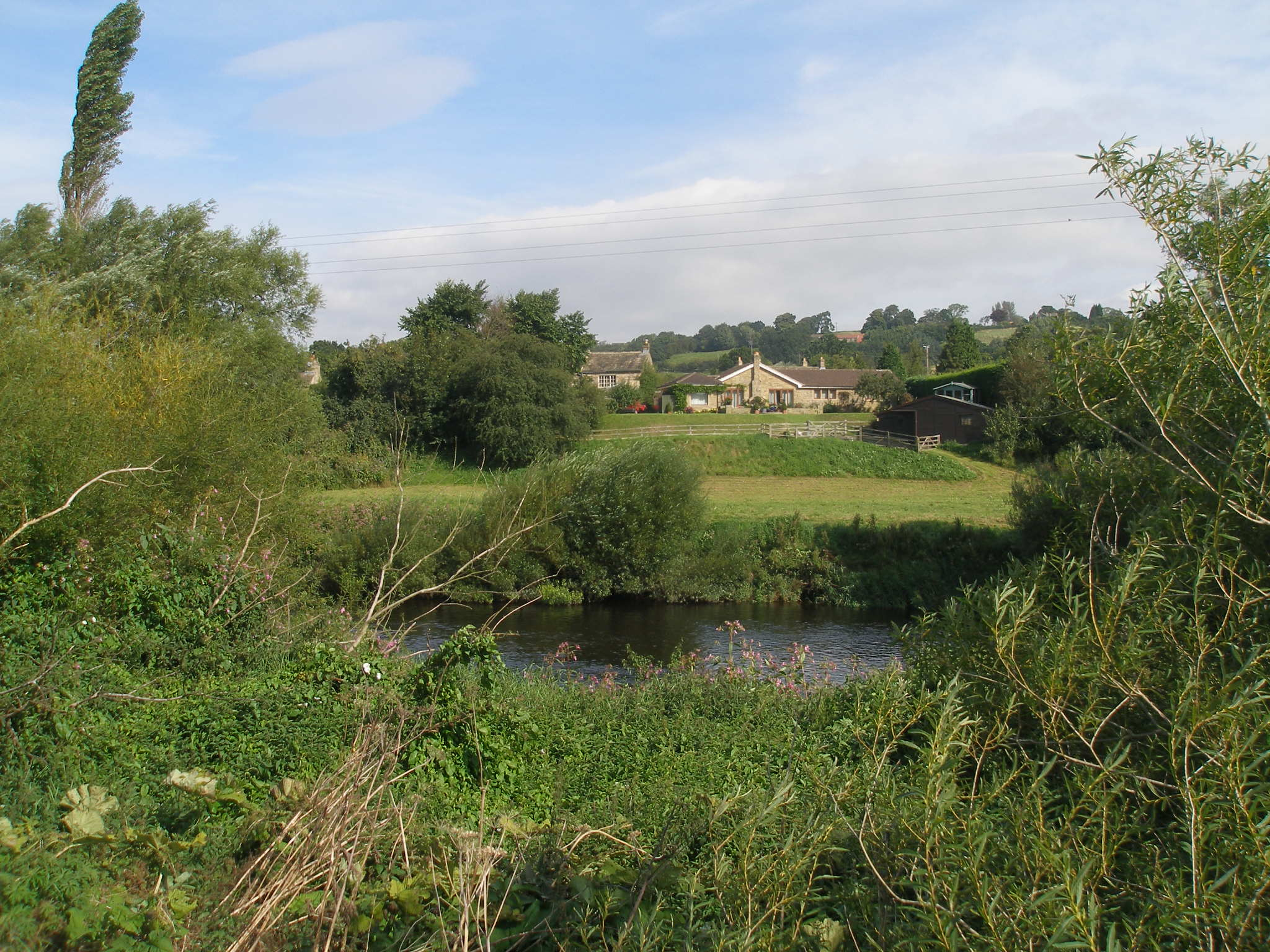
- Netherby seen across the River Wharfe

- Location within North Yorkshire
- OS grid reference: SE333468
- Civil parish: Kearby with Netherby
- Unitary authority: North Yorkshire
- Ceremonial county: North Yorkshire
- Region: Yorkshire and the Humber
- Country: England
- Sovereign state: United Kingdom
- Post town: WETHERBY
- Postcode district: LS22
- Police: North Yorkshire
- Fire: North Yorkshire
- Ambulance: Yorkshire

Netherby is a village in the county of North Yorkshire, England. It lies at grid reference SE333468, on the north bank of the River Wharfe, which forms the boundary with West Yorkshire here. The nearest town is Wetherby, 7 km to the east. This reach of the Wharfe is called Netherby Deep, and was the scene of a tragedy when two children drowned at a treacherous bathing place, which is recorded on a plaque there. The village lies in the Church of England parish of Kirkby Overblow and Sicklinghall.

Until 1974 it was part of the West Riding of Yorkshire. From 1974 to 2023 it was part of the Borough of Harrogate, it is now administered by the unitary North Yorkshire Council.
