= Dunkeswick =

Hamlet in North Yorkshire, England

Coordinates: 53.9174°N 1.5316°W

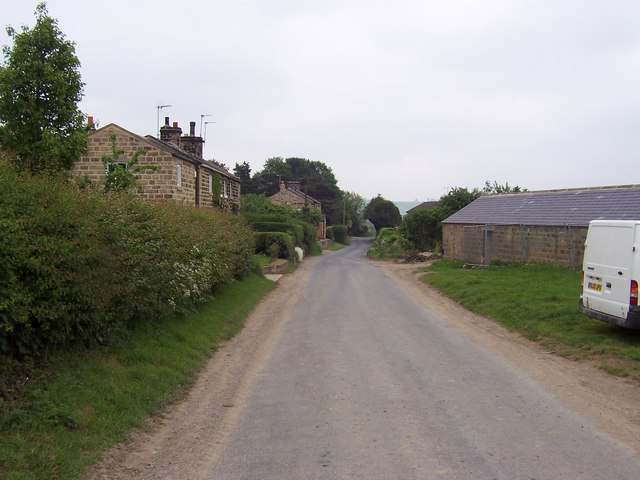

- Location within North Yorkshire
- OS grid reference: SE3046
- Civil parish: Kirkby Overblow
- Unitary authority: North Yorkshire
- Ceremonial county: North Yorkshire
- Region: Yorkshire and the Humber
- Country: England
- Sovereign state: United Kingdom

Dunkeswick is a hamlet in the civil parish of Kirkby Overblow, in North Yorkshire, England, just north of the River Wharfe, off the A61, about 2 miles (3.2 km) north of Harewood and 2 miles (3.2 km) south of Kirkby Overblow.

== Etymology ==
The name of Dunkeswick comes from the Old English words cēse ('cheese') and wīc ('dwelling, specialised farm'), and thus once meant 'farm specialising in cheese production'. The fact that keswick begins with [k] rather than the [tʃ] sound of cheese, however, reflects the influence of Old Norse pronunciation on the local language. The additional element Dun seems to have been added to distinguish the settlement from other places called Keswick, such as the nearby East Keswick.

== History ==
The remains of Rougemont Castle are southwest of the hamlet above the north bank of the River Wharfe. It is a good example of a ringwork. It was once the administrative centre of the Manor of Harewood, and was abandoned when Harewood Castle was built south of the river in the 14th century.

Dunkeswick was formerly a township in the ancient parish of Harewood in the West Riding of Yorkshire. In 1866, Dunkeswick became a separate civil parish, but on 1 April 1937 the parish was abolished and merged with Harewood. In 1931 the parish had a population of 136. In 1974 Dunkeswick was transferred, with the rest of the parish of Harewood, to the City of Leeds in the new county of West Yorkshire. In 1992 it was transferred from Harewood and West Yorkshire to the parish of Kirkby Overblow in North Yorkshire. From 1992 to 2023 it was part of the Borough of Harrogate. It is now administered by the unitary North Yorkshire Council.

The war memorial from Dunkeswick Methodist Chapel was housed in Harewood Methodist Chapel after the closure of Dunkeswick chapel. Harewood Methodist Chapel has since closed.

Dunkewsick Moor is noted as the site of the Knight Air Flight 816 crash in 1995. On 24 May 1995, this scheduled flight from Leeds Bradford Airport to Aberdeen crashed shortly after takeoff, with the loss of all 12 passengers and crew on board.
